= Efraín Ríos Montt =

38th President of Guatemala from 1982 to 1983

General Efraín Ríos Montt
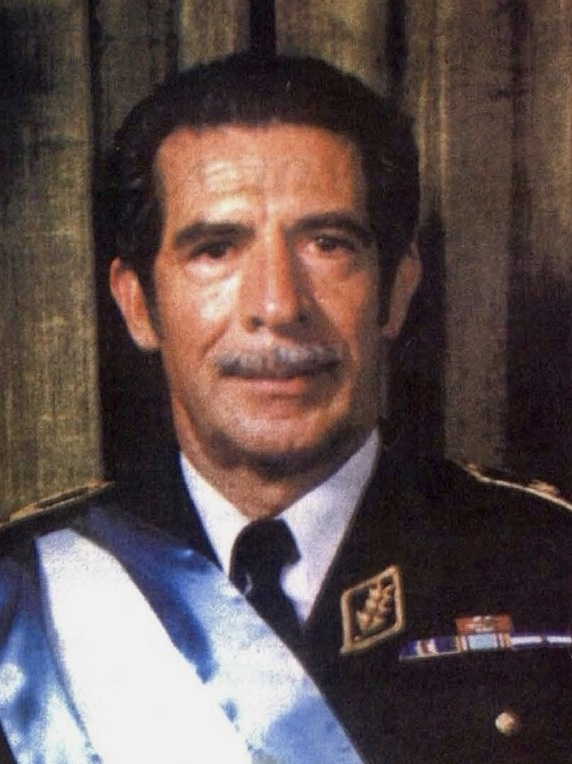
- Official portrait, c. 1982

38th President of Guatemala
- In office 23 March 1982 – 8 August 1983
- Preceded by: Romeo Lucas García
- Succeeded by: Óscar Mejía Víctores

President of the Congress of Guatemala
- In office 14 January 2000 – 14 January 2004
- Preceded by: Leonel Eliseo López Rodas
- Succeeded by: Francisco Rolando Morales Chávez
- In office 14 January 1995 – 14 January 1996
- Preceded by: Arabella Castro Quiñónez
- Succeeded by: Carlos Alberto García Regás

Personal details
- Born: José Efraín Ríos Montt; 16 June 1926 Huehuetenango, Guatemala
- Died: 1 April 2018 (aged 91) Guatemala City, Guatemala
- Resting place: Cemetery of La Villa de Guadalupe, Guatemala City, Guatemala
- Party: Guatemalan Christian Democracy (1974), Guatemalan Republican Front (1989–2013)
- Spouse: María Teresa Sosa Ávila (after 1953)
- Children: 3 (including Zury Ríos)
- Profession: Military officer, educator

Military service
- Allegiance: Guatemala
- Branch/service: Guatemalan Army
- Years of service: 1950–1977, 1982–1983
- Rank: Brigadier general

José Efraín Ríos Montt (Spanish: [efɾaˈin ˈrios ˈmont]; 16 June 1926 – 1 April 2018) was a Guatemalan military officer who served as de facto President of Guatemala from 1982 to 1983. His brief tenure as chief executive was one of the bloodiest periods in the long-running Guatemalan Civil War. Ríos Montt's counter-insurgency strategies significantly weakened the Marxist guerrillas organized under the umbrella of the Guatemalan National Revolutionary Unity (URNG), while also leading to accusations of war crimes and acts of genocide perpetrated by the Guatemalan Army under his leadership.

Ríos Montt was a career army officer. He was director of the Guatemalan military academy and rose to the rank of brigadier general. He was briefly chief of staff of the Guatemalan army in 1973. However, he was soon forced out of the position over differences with the military high command. He ran for president in the 1974 general election, losing to the official candidate, General Kjell Laugerud, in an electoral process widely regarded as fraudulent. In 1978, Ríos Montt left the Catholic Church and joined an Evangelical Christian group affiliated with the Gospel Outreach Church. In 1982, discontent with the rule of General Romeo Lucas García, the worsening security situation in Guatemala, and accusations of electoral fraud led to a coup d'état by a group of junior military officers who installed Ríos Montt as head of a government junta. Ríos Montt ruled as a military dictator for less than seventeen months before his defense minister, General Óscar Mejía Victores overthrew him in another coup.

In 1989, Ríos Montt returned to the Guatemalan political scene as leader of a new political party, the Guatemalan Republican Front (FRG). He was elected many times to the Congress of Guatemala, serving as president of the Congress in 1995–1996 and 2000–2004. A constitutional provision prevented him from registering as a presidential candidate due to his involvement in the military coup of 1982. However, the FRG obtained the presidency and a congressional majority in the 1999 general election. Authorized by the Constitutional Court to run in the 2003 presidential elections, Ríos Montt came in third and withdrew from politics. He returned to public life in 2007 as a member of Congress, thereby gaining legal immunity from long-running lawsuits alleging war crimes committed by him and some of his ministers and counselors during their term in the presidential palace in 1982–83. His immunity ended on 14 January 2012, when his legislative term of office expired. In 2013, a court sentenced Ríos Montt to 80 years in prison for genocide and crimes against humanity, but the Constitutional Court quashed that sentence, and his retrial was not completed before he died of a heart attack in April 2018.

== Early life and career ==
Efraín Ríos Montt was born on 16 June 1926 into a large ladino family of the rural middle class, in Huehuetenango, a small city in the highlands of western Guatemala. His father was a shopkeeper and his mother a seamstress. The family also owned a small farm. His younger brother Mario Enrique Ríos Montt became a Catholic priest and would serve as prelate of Escuintla and later as auxiliary bishop of the Archdiocese of Guatemala.

Intent on making a career in the army, the young Efraín applied to the Polytechnic School (the national military academy of Guatemala) but was rejected because of his astigmatism. He then volunteered for the Guatemalan Army as a private, joining troops composed almost exclusively of full-blooded Mayas, until in 1946, he was able to enter the Polytechnic School. Ríos Montt graduated in 1950 at the top of his class. He taught at the Polytechnic School and received further specialized training, first at the U.S.-run officer training institute that would later be known as the School of the Americas, and later at Fort Bragg in North Carolina and the Italian War College. From the start of his career, Ríos Montt acquired a reputation as a devoutly religious man and as a stern disciplinarian.

Ríos Montt did not play any significant role in the successful CIA-sponsored coup of 1954 against President Jacobo Arbenz. He rose through the ranks of the Guatemalan army and, in 1970–1972, served as director of the Polytechnic School. In 1972, in the presidential administration of General Carlos Arana Osorio, Ríos Montt was promoted to brigadier general and in 1973 he became the Army's Chief of Staff (Jefe del Estado Mayor General del Ejército). However, he was removed from that post after three months and, much to his chagrin, dispatched to the Inter-American Defense College in Washington, D.C. According to anthropologist David Stoll, writing in 1990, Ríos Montt was "at odds with the army's command structure since being sidelined by military president Gen. Carlos Arana Osorio in 1974."

== Early political involvement ==
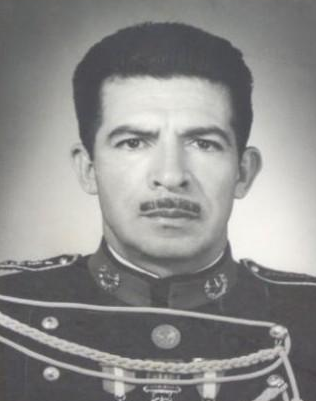
Ríos Montt in the army in 1960

While in the US, the leaders of the Guatemalan Christian Democracy approached Ríos Montt with an invitation to run for president at the head of a coalition of parties opposed to the incumbent regime. Ríos Montt participated in the March 1974 presidential elections as the National Opposition Front (FNO) presidential candidate. His running mate was Alberto Fuentes Mohr, a respected economist and social democrat. At the time, Ríos Montt was generally regarded as an honest and competent military man who could combat the rampant corruption in the Guatemalan government and armed forces. In the run-up to the election, United States officials characterized the candidate Ríos Montt as a "capable left-of-center military officer" who would shift Guatemala "perceptibly but not radically to the left".

=== 1974 presidential elections ===
The official presidential candidate for the 1974 Guatemalan general election was General Kjell Laugerud, whose running mate was Mario Sandoval Alarcón of the far-right National Liberation Movement. Pro-government posters warned "voters not to fall into a communist trap by supporting Ríos", but Ríos Montt proved to be an effective campaigner, and most observers believe that his FNO won the popular vote by an ample majority.

When early returns showed an unmistakable trend in favor of Ríos Montt, the government halted the count and manipulated the results to make it appear that Laugerud finished 71,000 votes ahead of Ríos Montt. Since Laugerud did not have an outright majority of the popular vote, the government-controlled National Congress decided the election, which chose Laugerud by a vote of 38 to 2, with 15 opposition deputies abstaining.

According to independent journalist Carlos Rafael Soto Rosales, Ríos Montt and the FNO leadership knew the election was fraudulent, but acquiesced in Laugerud's "election" because they feared that a popular uprising "would result in disorder that would provoke worse government repression and that a challenge would lead to a confrontation between military leaders." General Ríos Montt then left the country to take up an appointment as military attaché at the Guatemalan embassy in Madrid, where he remained until 1977. It was rumored that the military high command paid Ríos Montt several hundred thousand dollars in exchange for his departure from public life and that during his exile in Spain his unhappiness led him to excessive drinking.

=== Religious conversion ===
In 1977, Ríos Montt retired from the army and returned to Guatemala. In 1978, a spiritual crisis caused him to leave the Roman Catholic Church and join the Iglesia El Verbo ("Church of the Word"), an evangelical Protestant church affiliated with the Gospel Outreach Church and based in Eureka, California. Ríos Montt became very active in his new church and he also taught religion in a school which was affiliated with it. At the time, his younger brother Mario Enrique was the Catholic prelate of Escuintla.

Efraín Ríos Montt's conversion has been interpreted as a significant event in the ascendency of Protestantism within the traditionally Catholic nation of Guatemala (see Religion in Guatemala). Ríos Montt later befriended prominent evangelists in the US, including Jerry Falwell and Pat Robertson.

== De facto Presidency (1982–1983) ==
=== 1982 military coup ===
The security situation in Guatemala had deteriorated under the government of General Romeo Lucas García. By early 1982, the Marxist guerrilla groups belonging to the Guatemalan National Revolutionary Unity (URNG) umbrella organization had made gains in the countryside and were seen as threatening an attack on the capital, Guatemala City. On 7 March 1982, General Ángel Aníbal Guevara, the official party's candidate, was declared the winner of the presidential election, a result denounced as fraudulent by all opposition parties. An informal group described as oficiales jóvenes ("young officers") then staged a military coup that overthrew Lucas and prevented Guevara from succeeding him as president.

On 23 March, the coup culminated with the installation of a three-person military junta, presided by General Efraín Ríos Montt and composed also of General Horacio Maldonado Schaad and Colonel Luis Gordillo Martínez. Ríos Montt had not been directly involved in the planning of the coup and was chosen by the oficiales jóvenes because of the respect that he had acquired as director of the military academy and as the presidential candidate of the democratic opposition in 1974. The events of March 1982 took the U.S. authorities by surprise.

Because of repeated vote-rigging and the blatant corruption of the military establishment, the 1982 coup was initially welcomed by many Guatemalans. Ríos Montt's reputation for honesty, his leadership of the opposition in the 1974 election, and his vision of "education, nationalism, an end to want and hunger, and a sense of civic pride" were widely appealing. In April 1982, U.S. Ambassador Frederic L. Chapin declared that thanks to the coup of Ríos Montt, "the Guatemalan government has come out of the darkness and into the light." However, Chapin soon afterward reported that Ríos Montt was "naïve and not concerned with practical realities." Drawing on his Pentecostal beliefs, Ríos Montt compared the Four Horsemen of the Apocalypse to the four modern evils of hunger, misery, ignorance, and subversion. He also pledged to fight corruption and what he described as the depredations of the rich.

=== Dictatorship ===
The government junta immediately declared martial law and suspended the constitution, shut down the legislature, and set up special tribunals (tribunales de fuero especial) to prosecute both common criminals and political dissidents. On 10 April, the junta launched the National Growth and Security Plan, whose stated goals were to end indiscriminate violence and teach the populace about Guatemalan nationalism. The junta also announced that it sought to integrate peasants and indigenous peoples into the Guatemalan state, declaring that because of their illiteracy and "immaturity", they were particularly vulnerable to the seductions of "international communism". The government intensified its military efforts against the URNG guerrillas and, on 20 April 1982, launched a new counter-insurgency operation known as Victoria 82.

On 9 June, General Ríos Montt forced the other two junta members to resign, leaving him as sole head of state, commander of the armed forces, and minister of defense. On 17 August 1982, Ríos Montt established a new Consejo de Estado ("Council of State") as an advisory body whose members were appointed either by the executive or by various civil associations. This Council of State incorporated several representatives of Guatemala's indigenous population, a first in the history of the central Guatemalan government. As president of the Council of State, Ríos Montt appointed another Evangelical with ties to the Guatemalan Christian Democracy, Jorge Serrano Elías.

Under the motto, No robo, no miento, no abuso ("I don't steal, I don't lie, I don't abuse"), Ríos Montt launched a campaign ostensibly aimed at rooting out corruption in the government and reforming Guatemalan society. He also began broadcasting regular TV speeches on Sunday afternoons, known as discursos de domingo. According to historian Virginia Garrard-Burnett,

It was in his Sunday sermons that Ríos Montt explicated the moral roots of Guatemala's many problems and limned the outlines of his political and moral imaginaire. Although ridiculed both at home and abroad for their preachy and even naive tone (earning the General the derisive nickname "Dios Montt"), the discursos nonetheless bore an internally cohesive message that clearly laid out Ríos Montt's diagnosis of the crisis and his idiosyncratic vision for national redemption. In the General's view, Guatemala suffered from three fundamental problems: a national lack of responsibility and respect for authority, an absolute lack of morality, and an inchoate sense of national identity. All other issues, from the economic crisis to what Ríos Montt called the "subversion," were merely symptoms of these three fundamental ills.

Ríos Montt's moralizing message continued to resonate with a significant part of Guatemalan society after he departed from power in 1983. In 1990, anthropologist David Stoll quoted a development organizer as saying that she liked Ríos Montt "because he used to get on television, point his finger at every Guatemalan, and say: 'The problem is you!' That's the only way this country is ever going to change."

=== Counter-insurgency: Fusiles y Frijoles ===
Violence escalated in the countryside under the Guatemalan military's plan Victoria 82, which included a rural pacification strategy which was known as Fusiles y Frijoles (lit. 'Rifles and beans'), often rendered into English as "beans and bullets", to preserve the original alliteration of its name. The "bullets" referred to the organization of the Civil Defense Patrols (Patrullas de Autodefensa Civil, PAC), primarily composed of indigenous villagers who patrolled in groups of twelve, they were usually armed with a single M1 rifle but sometimes, they were not armed at all. The PAC initiative was intended both to provide a pro-government presence in isolated rural villages with a majority Mayan population and to deter guerrilla activity in the area. The "beans" component of the counter-insurgency strategy referred to programs seeking to increase civilian-military contact and cooperation by improving the infrastructure and resources the government provided to the Mayan villages. This was meant to create a link in the minds of the indigenous and peasant communities between better access to resources and their cooperation with the Guatemalan government in its military struggle against the insurgents.

In June 1982, General Ríos Montt's government announced an amnesty for all insurgents who were willing to lay down their arms. A month later, that announcement was followed by the declaration of a state of siege, leading to the curtailment of the activities of political parties and labor unions under the threat of death by firing squad for subversion. The counter-insurgency campaign pursued by Ríos Montt's government was widely seen, by both Guatemalan and foreign observers, as having rapidly turned the tide of the Guatemalan Civil War and put an end to any realistic prospect of the leftist insurgents taking power or even extending their influence in the countryside. In May 1983, the London-based journal The Economist declared that "with the help of Israeli advisors, [Guatemala] has succeeded where a similar campaign in neighboring El Salvador, pushed by American advisors, has failed."

Critics have claimed that, in practice, Ríos Montt's strategy was a scorched earth campaign which was waged against the indigenous Maya population, particularly in the departments of Quiché, Huehuetenango, and Baja Verapaz. According to the 1999 report by the UN-sponsored Historical Clarification Commission (CEH), this resulted in the annihilation of nearly 600 villages. One instance was the Plan de Sánchez massacre in Rabinal, Baja Verapaz, in July 1982, which saw over 250 people killed. Tens of thousands of peasant farmers fled over the border into southern Mexico. In 1982, an Amnesty International report estimated that over 10,000 indigenous Guatemalans and peasant farmers were killed from March to July of that year and that 100,000 rural villagers were forced to flee their homes. According to more recent estimates presented by the CEH, tens of thousands of non-combatants were killed during Ríos Montt's tenure as head of state. At the height of the bloodshed, reports put the number of disappearances and killings at more than 3,000 per month. The 1999 book State Violence in Guatemala, 1960–1996: A Quantitative Reflection, published by the American Association for the Advancement of Science, states that Rios Montt's government presided over "the most indiscriminate period of state terror. More state killings occurred during Ríos Montt’s regime than during any other, and in the same period the monthly rate of violence was more than four times greater than for the next highest regime."

On the other hand, the United Nations special rapporteur for the situation of human rights in Guatemala, the British judge Lord Colville of Culross, wrote in 1984 that the lot of the rural population of Guatemala had improved under Ríos Montt, as the previous indiscriminate violence of the Guatemalan Army was replaced by a rational strategy of counter-insurgency. Colville also indicated that extrajudicial "killings and kidnappings virtually ceased under the Ríos Montt regime." According to anthropologist David Stoll, "the crucial difference" between Ríos Montt and his predecessor Lucas García was that Ríos Montt replaced "chaotic terror with a more predictable set of rewards and punishments." According to analysts Georges A. Fauriol and Eva Loser of the Center for Strategic and International Studies, "an important component in the 'normalization' of the Guatemalan environment was a marked decrease by late 1982 in the state of fear and violence, which allowed the repositioning of Guatemala's civilian urbanized leadership toward a more vital role in national affairs."

Sociologist and historian Carlos Sabino, in a work published in 2007 by the Fondo de Cultura Económica, noted that the army's counter-insurgency in the Guatemalan highlands had been launched at the end of 1981, before the coup that put Ríos Montt in power, and that the reported massacres peaked in May 1982 before dropping off rapidly as a consequence of the policies implemented by the Ríos Montt regime. According to Sabino, the guerrillas were effectively defeated by the PACs organized by Ríos Montt's government, which grew to involve 900,000 men and which, "though only very partially armed, completely took away the guerrilla's capacity for political action", as they could no longer "reach the villages and towns, organize rallies, or recruit fighters and collaborators among the peasants." According to French sociologist Yvon Le Bot, writing in 1992,

Ríos Montt won a decisive victory over a guerrilla force already weakened by the blows landed upon it by General Benedicto Lucas during the last months of his brother's government. Since then, he is, more than the Lucas brothers, the bête noire of the revolutionaries who do not forgive him for having consummated their defeat by turning their own weapons against them and in particular by the appeal to the moral and religious sentiments so profoundly rooted among the Guatemalan Mayas.

In a similar vein, historian Virginia Garrard-Burnett concluded in 2010 that General Ríos Montt's military's successes "were unprecedented in Guatemala’s modern history" and that "had the Cold War remained the primary lens of historical analysis, [he] might well be remembered as a visionary statesman instead of an author of crimes against humanity."

Even some of Ríos Montt's harshest critics have noted that, in his later political career during the 1990s and 2000s, he enjoyed firm and enduring electoral support in the departments of Quiché, Huehuetenango, and Baja Verapaz, which had seen the worst violence during the 1982–83 counter-insurgency campaign. According to David Stoll, "the most obvious reason Nebajeños like the former general is that he offered them the chance to surrender without being killed."

=== Support from US and Israel ===
In 1977, the United States under the Jimmy Carter administration suspended aid to Guatemala due to the grave violations of human rights by the Guatemalan government. In 1981, the new Reagan administration authorized the sale to the Guatemalan military of $4 million in helicopter spare parts and $6.3 million in additional military supplies, to be shipped in 1982 and 1983.

President Ronald Reagan traveled to Central America in December 1982. He did not visit Guatemala but met with General Ríos Montt in San Pedro Sula, Honduras, on 4 December 1982. During that meeting, Ríos Montt reassured Reagan that the Guatemalan government's counter-insurgency strategy was not one of "scorched earth", but rather of "scorched Communists", and pledged to work to restore the democratic process in the country. Reagan then declared: "President Ríos Montt is a man of great personal integrity and commitment... I know he wants to improve the quality of life for all Guatemalans and to promote social justice."

Guatemala's poor record on human rights and the refusal of General Ríos Montt to call immediately for new elections prevented the Reagan administration from restoring US aid to Guatemala, which would have required the consent of the US Congress. The Reagan administration did continue the sale of helicopter parts to the Guatemalan military, even though a then-secret 1983 CIA cable noted a rise in "suspect right-wing violence" and an increasing number of bodies "appearing in ditches and gullies".

Israel, which had been supplying arms to Guatemala since 1974, continued its aid provisions during Ríos Montt's government. The cooperation did not just involve hardware but also included providing intelligence and operational training, carried out both in Israel and Guatemala. In 1982, Ríos Montt told ABC News that his success was due to the fact that "our soldiers were trained by Israelis." There was not much outcry in Israel at the time about its involvement in Guatemala, though the support for Ríos Montt was no secret. According to journalist Victor Perera, in 1985, at a cemetery in Chichicastenango, relatives of a man killed by the military told him that "in church they tell us that divine justice is on the side of the poor; but the fact of the matter is, it is the military who get the Israeli guns."

=== Removal from power ===
By the end of 1982, Ríos Montt, claiming that the war against the leftist guerrillas had been won, said the government's work was one of "techo, trabajo, y tortillas" ("roofs, work, and tortillas"). Having survived three attempted coups, on 29 June 1983, Ríos Montt declared a state of emergency and announced elections for July 1984. By then, Ríos Montt had alienated many segments of Guatemalan society by his actions. Shortly before the visit to Guatemala by Pope John Paul II in March 1983, Ríos Montt refused the Pope's appeal for clemency to six guerrillas who had been sentenced to death by the regime's special tribunals. The outspoken evangelicalism and the moralizing sermons of the general's regular Sunday television broadcasts (discursos de domingo) were increasingly regarded with embarrassment by many. The military brass was offended by his promotion of young officers in defiance of the Army's traditional hierarchy. Many middle-class citizens were unhappy with the decision, announced on 1 August 1983, to introduce the value-added tax in the country. One week later, on 8 August 1983, his own Minister of Defense, General Óscar Mejía Victores, overthrew the regime in a coup during which seven people were killed.

According to journalist Jean-Marie Simon, "although no one suffered more under Rios Montt's beans-and-bullets ideology than Guatemala's highland Indians, [Ríos Montt's] erratic admiration for their Mayan ancestry (Guatemalidad, as he called it) did nothing to endear him to Guatemala's ladino middle and wealthy classes, especially after his appointment of ten Indians to the hand-picked 88-member Council of State in September 1982." The leaders of the 1983 coup alleged that Ríos Montt belonged to a "fanatical and aggressive religious group" that had threatened the "fundamental principle of the separation of Church and State". Historian Virginia Garrard-Burnett considered that the main underlying reason for his removal from power was that Ríos Montt "had severely stanched the flow of graft to military officers and government officials" and was not responsive to the powerful interest groups represented by the Army's high command. It was reported that the soldier who escorted Ríos Montt out of the National Palace during the coup said to him "A government that doesn't abuse doesn't govern" (El gobierno que no abusa, no gobierna).

Political violence in Guatemala continued after Ríos Montt was removed from power in 1983. It has been estimated that as many as one and a half million Maya peasants were uprooted from their homes. American journalist Vincent Bevins writes that by corralling indigenous populations from suspect communities into state-established "model villages" (aldeas modelos) that were "little more than deadly concentration camps", Ríos Montt waged genocide differently than his predecessors, although massacres continued apace. Bevins argues this was part of Montt's new strategy for fighting communism: "The guerrilla is the fish. The people are the sea. If you cannot catch the fish, you have to drain the sea."

Efraín Ríos Montt's sister Marta Elena Ríos de Rivas was kidnapped on 26 June 1983 in Guatemala City by members of the leftist Rebel Armed Forces (FAR) when she was leaving the primary school where she worked as a teacher. At the time, she was five months pregnant. After General Ríos Montt was deposed in August of that year, the FAR proceeded to kidnap the sister of the new de facto president, General Mejía Víctores. The new government flatly refused to negotiate with the kidnappers, but the family of General Ríos Montt obtained the release of his sister Marta on 25 September, after 119 days in captivity, by procuring the publication of an FAR comuniqué in several international newspapers.

== Separation from politics ==
After his fall from power, Ríos Montt re-embraced to his religious vocation as an Evangelical preacher. In 1984, he travelled to the US, speaking at the National Religious Broadcasters's convention, as well as at the meetings of the National Association of Evangelicals and the Full Gospel Business Men's Fellowship. In 1985, he attended the National Prayer Breakfast and spoke alongside Pat Robertson at the first Hispanic Congress of Evangelization, which took place in Garden Grove, California.

Guatemala returned to democracy with the election of a Constitutional Assembly in 1984. Article 186 of the new Constitution of Guatemala banned those who had come to power by a military coup, as well as their immediate family, from running for president. Ríos Montt claimed that this was written into the Constitution specifically to prevent him from returning to the presidency and that it could not legitimately be applied retroactively. Vinicio Cerezo of the Guatemalan Christian Democracy party, to which Ríos Montt had been affiliated in 1974, became president following the general election of 1985.

== Later political career ==
Logo of the Frente Republicano Guatemalteco (FRG, "Guatemalan Republican Front") founded by General Ríos Montt in 1989 and officially registered in 1990. The logo is based on an image used by the military government in 1982–83 and tied to the motto No robo, no miento, no abuso ("I don't steal, I don't lie, I don't abuse"). Here the motto has been changed to Seguridad, bienestar, justicia ("Security, welfare, justice").

In 1989 Ríos Montt founded a new political party, the Guatemalan Republican Front (FRG). He attempted to register as the presidential candidate for the 1990 general election, at the head of a coalition of the FRG and two other political parties, the Institutional Democratic Party (PID) and the National Unity Front (FUN). His running mate was the businessman Harris Whitbeck Pinol. Polls indicated that Ríos Montt was the most popular candidate, leading his nearest rival by as many as twelve points. The courts, however, prevented that formula from appearing in the ballots, based on the constitutional ban.

Throughout the 1990s Ríos Montt enjoyed significant popular support throughout Guatemala and especially among the native Maya population of the departments of Quiché, Huehuetenango, and Baja Verapaz, where he was perceived as un militar recto (an honest military man), even though those had been the populations most directly affected by the counter-insurgency that Ríos Montt had led in 1982–83. According to anthropologist David Stoll

Ríos Montt's popularity was difficult to comprehend for most scholars and journalists because they have been so deeply influenced by human rights and solidarity work [...] The most influential literature on Guatemala has been written by activists, the majority of whom are also academics. Generally, this literature has been slow to admit the defeat of the guerrillas in 1982, their subsequent lack of popular support, and contradictions in the human rights movement.

According to political scientist Regina Bateson, in this new career phase, Ríos Montt embraced populism as his core political strategy. He was an FRG congressman between 1990 and 2004. In 1994, he was elected president of the National Congress. He tried to run again in the 1995–96 Guatemalan general election but was barred from entering the race. The FRG chose Alfonso Portillo to replace Ríos Montt as the party's presidential candidate, and he narrowly lost to Álvaro Arzú of the conservative National Advancement Party. In his youth, Portillo had been affiliated with the Guerrilla Army of the Poor (EGP), one of the Marxist insurgent groups that later became part of the Guatemalan National Revolutionary Unity (URNG) and which Ríos Montt had combated during his term as president in 1982–83.

The Guatemalan Civil War officially concluded in 1996 with the signing of the peace accords between the Guatemalan government and the URNG, which after that was organized as a legal political party. In March 1999, U.S. President Bill Clinton declared that "for the United States, it is important I state clearly that support for military forces and intelligence units which engaged in violence and widespread repression [in Guatemala] was wrong and the United States must not repeat that mistake."

Ríos Montt's FRG party was successful in the 1999 Guatemalan general election. Its candidate, Alfonso Portillo, was elected president, and the party also obtained a majority in the National Congress. Ríos Montt then served four consecutive one-year terms as president of Congress, from 2000 to 2004.

In 2000, President Portillo admitted the involvement of the Guatemalan government in human rights abuses over the previous 20 years, including two massacres that took place during Ríos Montt's presidency. The first was at Plan de Sánchez, in Baja Verapaz, with 200 dead, and the second at Dos Erres, in Petén, where 120 people were murdered.

=== 2003 presidential candidate ===
In May 2003, the FRG nominated Ríos Montt for the November presidential election. However, his candidacy was rejected again by the electoral registry and by two lower courts. On 14 July 2003, the Constitutional Court, which had had several judges appointed by the FRG government, approved his candidacy for president on the grounds that the prohibition in the 1985 Constitution did not apply retroactively.

On 20 July, the Supreme Court suspended Ríos Montt's campaign and agreed to hear a complaint brought by two right-of-center parties that the retired General was constitutionally barred from running for president. Ríos Montt denounced the ruling as a judicial manipulation and, in a radio address, called on his followers to take to the streets to protest against it. On 24 July, in an event that came to be known as jueves negro ("Black Thursday"), thousands of masked FRG supporters invaded the streets of Guatemala City, armed with machetes, clubs, and guns. They had been bussed in from all over the country by the FRG, and it was alleged that public employees in FRG-controlled municipalities were threatened with the loss of their jobs if they did not participate in the demonstrations. The protestors blocked traffic, chanted threatening slogans, and waved machetes as they marched on the courts, the opposition parties' headquarters, and newspapers. Incidents of torching of buildings, shooting out of windows, and burning of cars and tires in the streets were also reported. A television journalist, Héctor Fernando Ramírez, died of a heart attack while running away from a mob. After two days, the rioters disbanded when an audio recording of Ríos Montt was played on loudspeakers calling them to return to their homes. The situation was so volatile over the weekend that the UN mission and the US embassy were closed.

Following the rioting, the Constitutional Court overturned the Supreme Court decision, allowing Ríos Montt to run for president. However, the jueves negro chaos undermined Ríos Montt's popularity and his credibility as a law-and-order candidate. Support for Ríos Montt also suffered because of the perceived corruption and inefficiency of the incumbent FRG administration under President Portillo. During tense but peaceful presidential elections on 9 November 2003, Ríos Montt received 19.3% of the vote, placing him third behind Óscar Berger, head of the conservative Grand National Alliance (GANA), and Álvaro Colom of the center-left National Unity of Hope (UNE). As he had been required to give up his seat in Congress to run for president, Ríos Montt's 14-year legislative tenure also ended.

In March 2004, a court order forbade Ríos Montt from leaving the country while it determined whether he should stand trial on charges related to jueves negro and the death of Ramírez. On 20 November 2004, Ríos Montt had to request permission to travel to his country home for the wedding of his daughter, Zury Ríos, to U.S. Representative Jerry Weller, a Republican from Illinois. On 31 January 2006, manslaughter charges against him for the death of Ramírez were dropped.

== Charges of crimes against humanity ==
The Inter-Diocese Project for the Recovery of the Historic Memory (REMHI), sponsored by the Catholic Church, and the Historical Clarification Commission (CEH), co-sponsored by the United Nations as part of the 1996 peace accords, produced reports documenting grave violations of human rights committed during the Guatemalan Civil War of 1960–1996. That war had pitted Marxist rebels against the Guatemalan state, including the Guatemalan army. Up to 200,000 Guatemalans were estimated to have been killed during the conflict, making it one of Latin America's bloodiest wars. Both the REMHI and CEH reports found that most of the violence had been carried out by the Guatemalan state and by government-backed death squads. Since the victims of this violence had disproportionately belonged to the indigenous Mayan population of the country, the CEH report characterized the counterinsurgency campaign, significantly designed and advanced during Ríos Montt's presidency, as having included deliberate "acts of genocide".

The REMHI and CEH reports formed the basis for legal actions brought against Ríos Montt and others for crimes against humanity and genocide. Ríos Montt admitted that the Guatemalan army had committed crimes during his term as president and commander-in-chief, but he denied that he had planned or ordered those actions or that there had been any deliberate policy by his government to target the native population that could amount to genocide.

In 1998, Mario Enrique Ríos Montt, younger brother of Efraín Ríos Montt, succeeded murdered bishop Juan Gerardi as head of the Office of Human Rights of the Archdiocese of Guatemala. That office took a leading role in denouncing human rights abuses committed by the state during the Guatemalan Civil War, including during the government of General Ríos Montt.

=== In Spain ===
In 1999, Guatemalan Nobel Peace Prize laureate Rigoberta Menchú filed a complaint before the Audiencia Nacional of Spain for torture, genocide, illegal detention, and state-sponsored terrorism, naming Ríos Montt and four other retired Guatemalan generals (two of them ex-presidents) as defendants. Three other civilians that were high government official between 1978 and 1982 were also named in the complaint. The Center for Justice and Accountability and the Asociación Pro Derechos Humanos de España (APDHE) joined in the suit brought by Menchú. In September 2005, Spain's Constitutional Court ruled that Spanish courts could try those accused of crimes against humanity, even if the victims were not Spanish nationals.

In June 2006, Spanish judge Santiago Pedraz traveled to Guatemala to interrogate Ríos Montt and the others named in the case. At least 15 appeals filed by the defense attorneys of the indicted prevented him from carrying out the inquiries. On 7 July 2006, Pedraz issued an international arrest warrant against Efraín Ríos Montt and former presidents Óscar Humberto Mejía Victores and Romeo Lucas García (the latter of whom had died in May 2006 in Venezuela). A warrant was also issued for the retired generals Benedicto Lucas García and Aníbal Guevara. Former minister of the interior Donaldo Álvarez Ruiz, who remained at large, and ex-chiefs of police Germán Chupina Barahona and Pedro García Arredondo were also named on the international arrest warrants. Some of those warrants were initially admitted by Guatemalan courts, but they were all ultimately declared invalid in December 2007 by the Constitutional Court. All the cases relating to the Guatemalan Civil War that were brought before the Audiencia Nacional were eventually dropped, without any defendant facing trial.

=== In Guatemala ===
On 17 January 2007, Ríos Montt announced that he would run for a seat in Congress again in the election to be held later in the year. As a member of Congress, he would again be immune from prosecution unless a court suspended him from office. He won his seat in the September election and led the FRG's 15-member congressional delegation in the new legislature.

Ríos Montt's immunity ended on 14 January 2012, when his term in office expired. On 26 January 2012, he appeared in court in Guatemala City and was formally indicted by Attorney General Claudia Paz y Paz for genocide and crimes against humanity. On 1 March 2012, a judge ruled the charges against Ríos Montt were not covered by the 1996 National Reconciliation Law, which had granted amnesty for political and common crimes committed in the course of the Guatemalan Civil War. On 28 January 2013, judge Miguel Angel Galves opened a pre-trial hearing against Ríos Montt and retired General José Mauricio Rodríguez Sánchez, who had served under Ríos Montt as Director of Military Intelligence, for genocide and crimes against humanity. The charges against them listed the killing of 1,771 Maya Ixil Indians, including children.

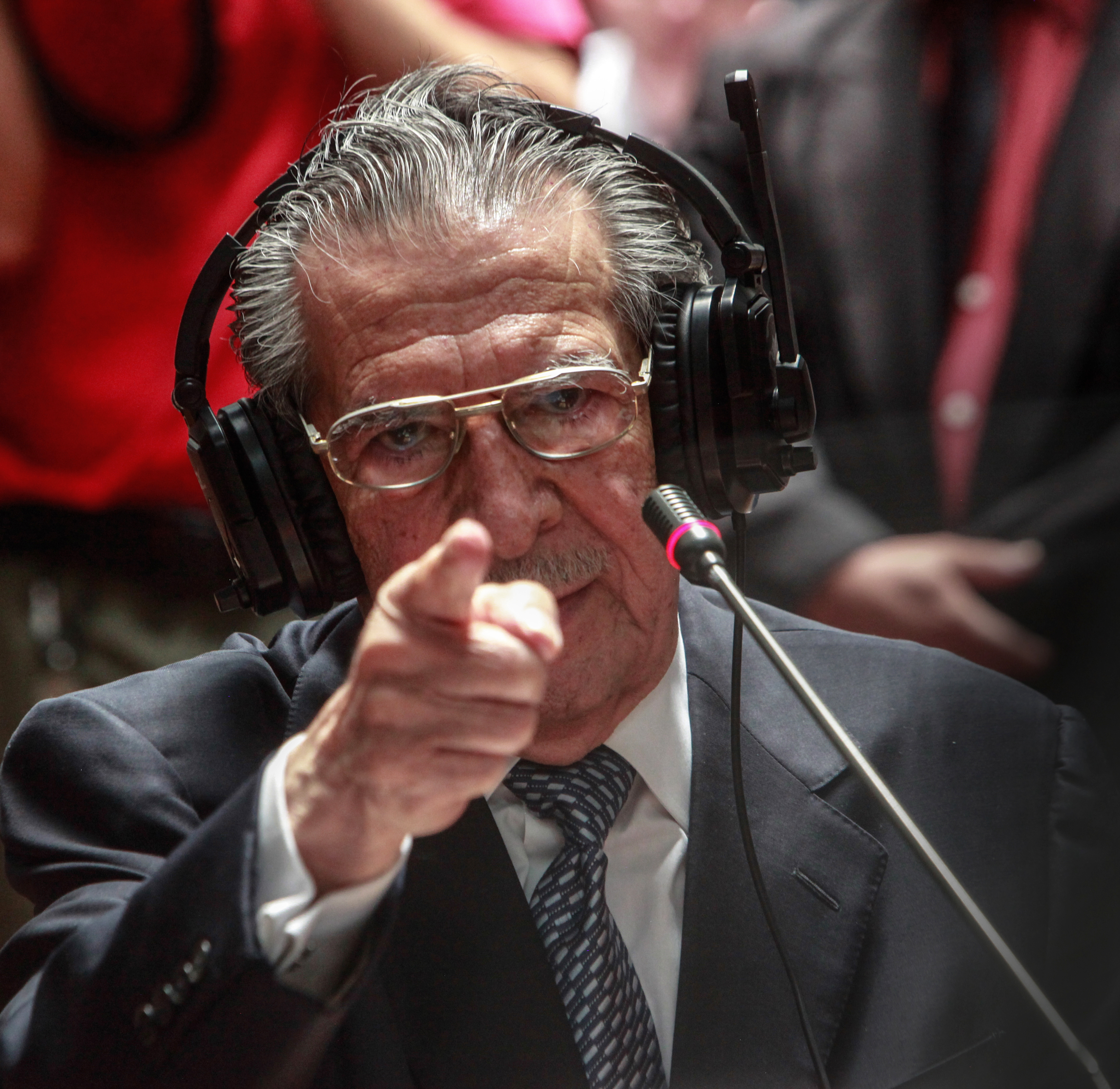
Efraín Ríos Montt in court in 2013

The trial began on 19 March 2013, marking the first time that a former Latin American head of state was tried for genocide in his own country. The proceedings engendered considerable controversy in Guatemala. A number of political figures and signatories of the 1996 Peace Accords including former vice presidents Luis Alberto Flores Asturias and Eduardo Stein, sociologist and former guerrilla leader Gustavo Porras Castejón, and former URNG delegate to the peace process Adrián Zapata, signed a public declaration calling the genocide charges "a juridical fabrication" that threatened to betray the peace accords.

On 10 May 2013, Ríos Montt was convicted by the court of genocide and crimes against humanity and was sentenced to 80 years imprisonment. Announcing the ruling, Judge Iris Yassmin Barrios Aguilar declared that "[t]he defendant is responsible for masterminding the crime of genocide." She continued: "We are convinced that the acts the Ixil suffered constitute the crime of genocide... [Ríos Montt] had knowledge of what was happening and did nothing to stop it." The Court found that "[t]he Ixils were considered public enemies of the state and were also victims of racism, considered an inferior race... The violent acts against the Ixils were not spontaneous. They were planned beforehand." Judge Iris Yassmin Barrios Aguilar referred to evidence that 5.5% of the Ixil people had been wiped out by the army.

The verdict was celebrated as a landmark victory by Amnesty International, Human Rights Watch, and other international human rights organizations. On the other hand, its fairness was attacked by Mary O'Grady, of the Wall Street Journal, who cited the work of sociologist and historian Carlos Sabino on the nature of the state's campaign against the insurgency in the Guatemalan Civil War and mentioned the public opposition to the trial by former guerrilla intellectual Gustavo Porras.

On 20 May 2013, the Constitutional Court of Guatemala overturned Ríos Montt's conviction on the grounds that he had not been allowed an effective defense during some of the proceedings. General Ríos Montt's retrial began in January 2015, but the court later ruled that the proceedings would not be public. It also held that no sentence could be pronounced due to Ríos Montt's age and deteriorating physical and mental condition. Earlier, Guatemala's forensic authority ruled that Ríos Montt could not defend himself effectively due to dementia. The retrial had not been completed when Ríos Montt died in April 2018, and the court, therefore, closed the case against him. His co-defendant, former chief of military intelligence José Mauricio Rodríguez Sánchez, was acquitted in September 2018, although the court found that the counter-insurgency strategy of the Guatemalan army had amounted to genocide.

Anthropologist David Stoll, though granting that large numbers of innocent civilians were killed by the army under Ríos Montt's presidency, questioned both the fairness of the 2013 trial and the grounds for the charge of genocide. Stoll has also argued that the cases brought earlier before the Audiencia Nacional of Spain had not progressed because of the difficulty of proving that the crimes committed by the Guatemalan Army had followed an "intent to destroy, in whole or in part” a racial or ethnic group, as required by the international statutes to obtain a conviction for genocide.

== Death ==
Ríos Montt died of a heart attack at his home in Guatemala City on 1 April 2018, at the age of 91. The then-incumbent president of Guatemala, Jimmy Morales, expressed his public condolences over the death of General Ríos Montt.

== In media and popular culture ==
Pamela Yates directed When the Mountains Tremble (1983), a documentary film about the war between the Guatemalan Military and the Mayan Indigenous population of Guatemala. Footage from this film was used as forensic evidence in the Guatemalan court for crimes against humanity in the genocide case against Efraín Ríos Montt.

Granito: How to Nail a Dictator (2011) by Pamela Yates is a follow-up to When the Mountains Tremble.

The University of Southern California's Shoah Foundation, funded by director Steven Spielberg, is undertaking an extensive analysis of the genocidal Guatemalan civil wars, documented by hundreds of filmed interviews with survivors.

The 2019 Guatemalan horror film La Llorona features a character named Enrique Monteverde, based on Ríos Montt.

== See also ==
- History of Guatemala
- Guatemala National Police Archives

Political offices
| Preceded by Fernando Romeo Lucas García | President of Guatemala; 1982–1983 | Succeeded by Óscar Humberto Mejía Victores |
| Preceded by Arabella Castro Quiñónez | President of the Congress of Guatemala; 1995–1996 | Succeeded by Carlos Alberto García |
| Preceded by Leonel Eliseo López | President of the Congress of Guatemala; 2000–2004 | Succeeded by Francisco Rolando Morales |
