= Iduvina Hernández =

Guatemalan journalist and human rights activist

- Born: Iduvina Estalinova Hernández Batres; 1955 (age 70–71); Guatemala City, Guatemala
- Education: Universidad de San Carlos de Guatemala
- Occupations: Journalist, human rights activist
- Years active: 1975–present

Iduvina Hernández (born 1955) is a Guatemalan journalist and internationally recognized human rights activist. Her work has involved analyzing democracy and state security. Specifically, her research has focused on the violence which occurred during the Guatemalan Civil War and rebuilding the structures to support the country's democracy. In her childhood, her father was threatened by the National Civil Police and her husband was killed in 1984. She interrupted her education after his murder and moved to Mexico, living in exile there and working as a journalist until 1989. After her return to Guatemala, Hernández wrote articles focused on the war and counterinsurgency for Crónica magazine.

When the Peace Accords were accepted in 1996, Hernández worked with the Historical Clarification Commission and then with the Myrna Mack Foundation, hoping to assist families in gaining information to prosecute human rights violations which occurred during the war. In 2000, she co-founded an NGO, Seguridad em Democracia (SEDEM, Security in Democracy), with the goals of helping victims of the war and reestablishing processes which would facilitate democracy and reform in Guatemala. Between 2003 and 2007, she worked on projects to protect and digitize the archival records of the Estado Mayor Presidencial (EMP, Presidential General Staff) and the National Police Archives. Because she believed the public had a right to access the records, she was among the activists who successfully pressed for the passage of the 2008 Ley de Libre Acceso a la Información Pública (Law of Free Access to Public Information).

Hernández has written numerous reports analyzing the war and the processes necessary re-establish systems which offer both transparency and provide for state security within a democratic framework. She has also conducted training on both national and an international level for the implementation of processes to ensure that security services are balanced. Her work has resulted in numerous threats against her safety and intervention from international human rights organizations.

== Early life and education ==
Iduvina Estalinova Hernández Batres was born in Guatemala City, Guatemala in 1955. She grew up in a working-class family with five siblings and was encouraged to read rather than watch television by her father. Her mother operated a food stall and was a seamstress. She sewed aprons, which the children sold in the marketplace to help with the family income. At the age of eight, the National Civil Police raided the family home because her father had been reported by a neighbor. Hernández became interested in human rights activism in 1975, while attending the Universidad de San Carlos de Guatemala, from which she graduated in 1980, with a degree in sociology. Upon graduating, Hernández married, but her husband was killed in 1984 during the Guatemalan Civil War. At the time, she was continuing her studies for a degree in psychology, but was unable to complete her education. Fleeing the country, she went into exile in Mexico, where she remained until 1989.

== Career ==
After arriving in Mexico City, Hernández began working as a journalist. In 1989, she returned to Guatemala and began working as a journalist for the magazine Crónica in 1990. Many of her articles focused on the war and counterinsurgency and she interviewed some of the key people involved in military intelligence. Though her investigations drew criticism and threats from some factions, in 1995, she was awarded the Premio Centroamericano de Peridismo (Central American Prize for Journalism) by the United Nations High Commissioner for Refugees for her work on Guatemalan refugees living in Mexico. When the Peace Accords were finally signed in 1996, Hernández worked as a staff investigator for the Historical Clarification Commission. After their work concluded and a report was issued, in 1999, she began working for the Myrna Mack Foundation, heading their analysis department. As an expert witness in the case to investigate and prosecute those who murdered Mack, a protection order was issued because of threats to her safety and remained in place from 2003 to 2009. As soon as the protective order was released, new threats were made against Hernández and her staff, which prompted the Inter-American Commission on Human Rights to urge Guatemala to guarantee the safety of the activists and keep the commission advised of measures to prevent future endangerment of human rights defenders.

In 2000, Hernández co-founded and became executive director for an NGO, Seguridad em Democracia (SEDEM, Security in Democracy). Through the organization, she carries out research into atrocities committed during the war, seeks resolution for victims of state violence, and works to improve the processes of democracy and reform in Guatemala. In 2003, Grupo de Apoyo Mutuo (GAM, Mutual Support Group), an association dedicated to helping those with disappeared family members, and SEDEM worked with the Procuraduría de los Derechos Humanos (PDH, Human Rights Ombudsman's Office) to assist in processing the archives of the Estado Mayor Presidencial (EMP, Presidential General Staff), when the EMP was dissolved as per requirements of the Peace Accords. They were joined in 2004, by the Centro Para la Acción Legal en Derechos Humanos (CALDH, Center for Human Rights Legal Action), Hijos e Hijas por la Identidad y la Justicia y Contra el Olvido y el Silencio (HIJOS, Sons and Daughters for Identity and Justice and Against Forgetting and Silence) and the Oficina de Derechos Humanos del Arzobispado de Guatemala (ODHAG, Human Rights Office of the Archbishop of Guatemala) to digitize the records and prevent their destruction. Because of the urgency of the work and the lack of international funding, the context of the images on the more than seven hundred discs were lost, meaning that they were not recorded in sequence or with regard to their relationship to other documents. Despite the problems associated with the preservation, SEDEM and GAM, the two NGOs which remained until the completion of the project, came to be associated with the stewardship of the archives, rather than the official government entity charged with document preservation, the Archivo General de Centroamérica (AGCA, General Archive of Central America).

In June 2005, an explosion at the Mariscal Zavala Military Base in Guatemala City, caused by improperly stored explosives, revealed a massive archive of documents which had been stored by the Policía Nacional Civil (PNC, National Civil Police), during the dictatorship in Guatemala. Sergio Morales, the ombudsman for PDH, called for special authority to be given to his office to prosecute violations which the records might document. Typically the office only had authority to investigate, while actually bringing cases in the courts was the responsibility of the Public Ministry. Morales took charge of securing the records to prevent them being discarded or destroyed. Because neither the Archivo General de Centroamérica (AGCA, General Archive of Central America) nor the PDH had sufficient funds or adequate trained personnel to process the archives in a professional manner, the PDH called on volunteers from human rights groups including SEDEM and GAM to assist in organizing the materials. Gaining financial support from international archivists, the groups were able to process the archives for scientific preservation while balancing the need to address the human rights investigations in a timely manner. SEDEM paid for staff to be hired to assist in processing the records.

After the recovery of the records, Hernández and Nineth Montenegro of GAM and their organizations were excluded from discussion of what would become of the archives, as well as access to them. Montenegro, a congresswoman, made a public demand for access to the records and Hernández campaigned for passage of legislation. In 2008, the Guatemalan Congress approved the Ley de Libre Acceso a la Información Pública (Law of Free Access to Public Information), opening the records to the public in 2009. Since that time, Hernández has organized seminars and workshops on both the national and international level to provide training on security reform and implementation of democratic controls. She has worked with organizations like the National Security Archive in Washington D.C. to establish protocols for declassifying information related to Guatemala and the systems the state implemented in the name of security. She has been involved in pressing for legislation to protect on-going monitoring and auditing of state institutions to ensure transparency, and implement procedures to ensure that government operatives are not granted impunity for their actions. In her research, she focuses on corruption and institutions and methods to protect society, which have resulted in numerous threats against her and other staff at SEDEM.

Hernández has faced three prosecutions for allegations of participation in the atrocities committed during the Civil War. In December 2011, she was among a group of fifty-one people accused of kidnappings, murders, and tortures, which occurred between 1965 and 1980. In April 2012, she was also included in an accusation filed by a family member of a military officer against over one hundred people, who supposedly committed disappearances, and participated in genocide and terrorism against society between 1960 and 1985. Despite the evidence that Hernández presented to the court confirming that she was a minor and for part of that time was living in Mexico, the cases remain open. In 2016, after she filed a complaint about a military parade, Hernández and other activists began receiving death and rape threats through social media. In August of that year, another family member of a military officer, filed an accusation against Hernández claiming that she had made a death threat. The Protection Unit for Human Rights Defenders of Guatemala discovered that the case had initially been filed giving an incorrect address for Hernández's notification and a first hearing had occurred in June without her knowledge. They pointed out to the court that the case appeared to be a revitalization for work Hernández had done to document cases of human rights violations by military personnel. None of the cases had been resolved by 2019.

== Selected works ==
- Hernández, Iduvina (2002). "Capítulo 4: El proceso POLSEDE – una mirada desde dentro [Chapter 4: The POLSEDE (Política de Seguridad para la Democracia) Process – A Look from the Inside]". In Arévalo, Bernardo; Beltrán, José; Fluri, Philipp (eds.). Hacia una política de seguridad para la democracia [Towards a Security Policy for Democracy in Guatemala] (PDF) (in Spanish). Guatemala: FLACSO. pp. 79–96. ISBN 978-99922-66-63-2. Archived (PDF) from the original on 8 March 2022.
- Hernández, Iduvina (October 2011). Mathieu, Hans; Niño Guarnizo, Catalina (eds.). "Centroamérica: los desafíos actuales del Tratado Marco de Seguridad Democrática" [Central America: The Current Challenges of the Framework Treaty on Democratic Security] (PDF). Anuario 2011 de la seguridad regional en América Latina y el Caribe (in Spanish). Bogotá, Colombia: Friedrich Ebert Foundation: 68–75. ISSN 2216-1082. Archived (PDF) from the original on 1 September 2022.
- Hernández, Iduvina (September 2005). Camino rocoso: Avances y desafíos de la reforma de inteligencia en Guatemala [Rocky Road: Advances and Challenges of Intelligence Reform in Guatemala] (PDF) (Report) (in Spanish). Washington, D.C.: Washington Office on Latin America. Archived (PDF) from the original on 11 April 2022.
- Hernández Batres, Iduvina (November 2013). Niño Guarnizo, Catalina (ed.). "Guatemala: Violencia y autoritarismo, una mezcla peligrosa" [Guatemala: Violence and Authoritarianism, a Dangerous Mix] (PDF). Anuario 2013 de la seguridad regional en América Latina y el Caribe (in Spanish). Bogotá, Colombia: Friedrich Ebert Foundation: 124–134. ISSN 2216-1082. Archived (PDF) from the original on 31 March 2022.
