= Territorial Prelature of Santo Cristo de Esquípulas =

Roman Catholic ecclesiastical territory in Guatemala

Coordinates: 10.0559°N 84.4222°W

Territorial Prelature of Santo Cristo de Esquípulas Praelatura Territorialis SS.D.N.I.C. de Esquipulas

Location
- Country: Guatemala
- Metropolitan: Immediately subject to the Holy See

Information
- Rite: Latin Rite

Current leadership
- Bishop: Rosolino Bianchetti Boffelli

Map
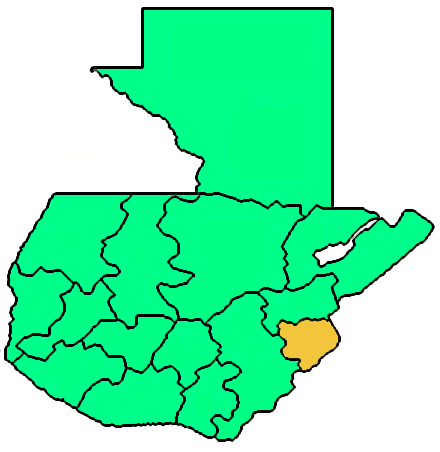

The Territorial Prelature of Santo Cristo de Esquípulas (Latin: Praelatura Territorialis SS.D.N.I.C. de Esquipulas) was a Roman Catholic territorial prelature located in the city of Esquipulas, Chiquimula in Guatemala. On June 24, 1986 it became part of the Diocese of Zacapa y Santo Cristo de Esquipulas.

== History ==
- September 16, 1956: Established as Territorial Prelature of Santo Cristo de Esquípulas from the Roman Catholic Diocese of Zacapa
- June 24, 1986: Suppressed and became part of the Diocese of Zacapa y Santo Cristo de Esquipulas

== Special churches ==
- Minor Basilicas:
  - Basílica del Cristo Negro de Esquipulas, Esquipulas, Chiquimula

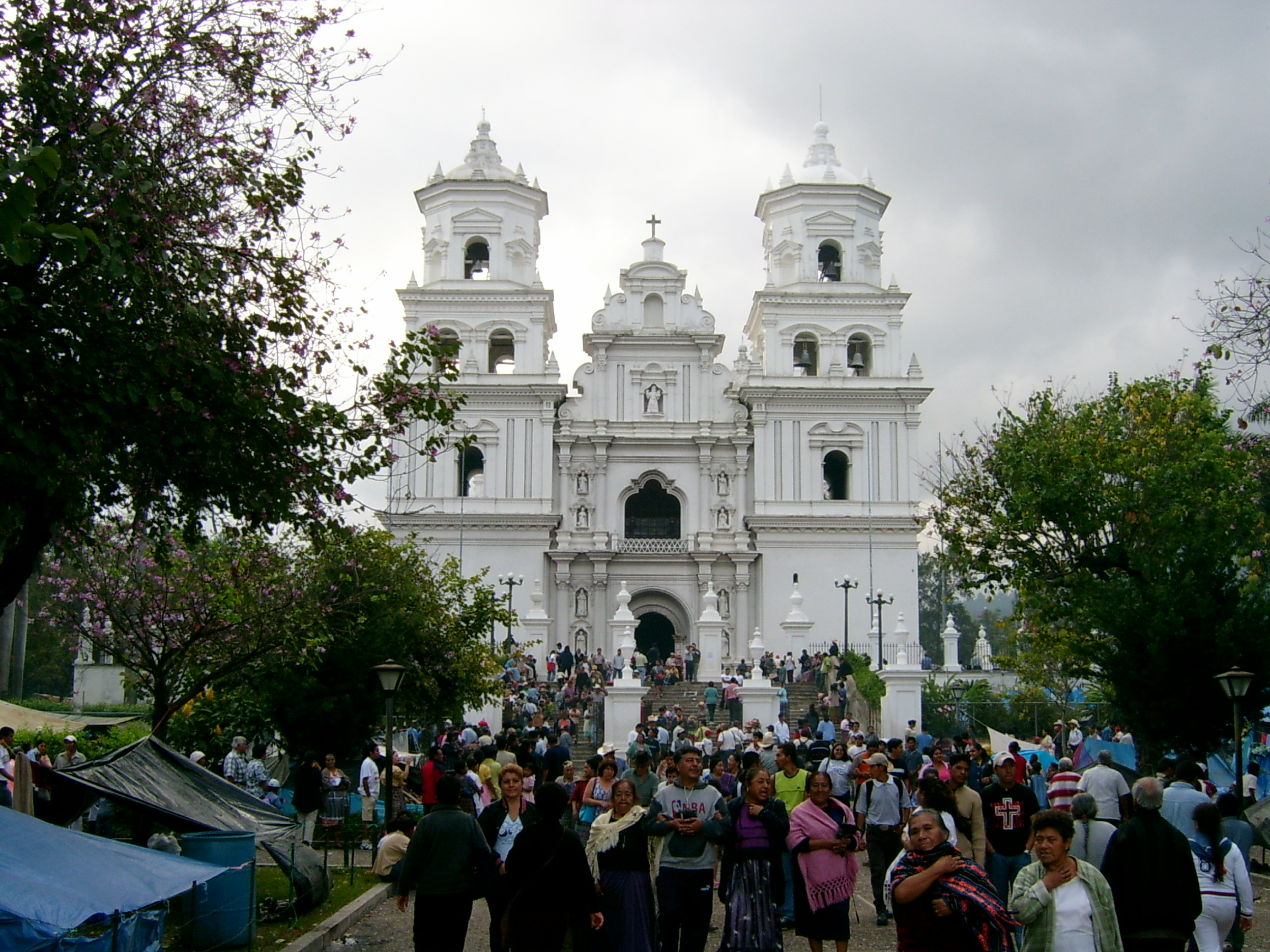
Basílica del Cristo Negro de Esquipulas

== Leadership ==
- Prelates of Santo Cristo de Esquípulas (Roman rite)
  - Archbishop Mariano Rossell y Arellano (1956)
  - Bishop Costantino Cristiano Luna Pianegonda, O.F.M. (September 16, 1956 – February 16, 1980)
