= Guatemala National Police Archives =

[In 2011], after more than five and a half years of arduous work, there is a topographic inventory that allows us to pinpoint the location of the documents in the AHPN, which have finally been identified, preserved, classified, ordered and described. An archival system is being implemented which meets the highest international regulatory standards in this field. The AHPN has a group of highly qualified people with the skills necessary to identify, process, and analyze documents containing information relating to events that constitute human rights violations. It also possesses cutting-edge technology and know-how that allows the digitization of documents at a rate of two million, eight hundred thousand pages a year.

— Prologue to From Silence to Memory (2013)

In July 2005, in an abandoned warehouse in downtown Guatemala City, Guatemala, delegates from the country's Institution of the Procurator for Human Rights uncovered, by sheer chance, a vast archive detailing the history of the defunct National Police and its role in the Guatemalan Civil War. Over five rooms full of files containing names, address, identity documents, were brought to light.

The store of documents measures nearly 8 kilometres (5 mi) length, and contains records dating as far back as the late 19th century (1882) and as recent as 1997. Since the discovery, forensic teams have been carefully archiving the files they have found, with the help of specialized organizations like Benetech and Human Rights Data Analysis Group, and software such as Martus.

In December 2009, the AHPN achieved legal certainty through the Inter-Institutional Cooperation Agreement between the Ministry of the Interior and the Ministry of Culture and Sport. By the end of 2013, more than 15 million documents (about 20% of the roughly 80 million total sheets) had been digitized. In July 2015, the AHPN celebrated the tenth anniversary of its discovery.

== Discovery ==
In July 2005, an explosion near the police compound prompted officials to inspect surrounding buildings looking for bombs left from the war. While investigating an abandoned munitions depot, they found it stuffed with police records. Investigators described the room as “brim with head-high heaps of papers, some bundled with plastic string, and others mixed with books, photographs, videotapes and computer disks—all told, nearly five linear miles of documents.”

This archive contains approximately 80 million pages of information from the Guatemalan National Police, the largest collection of state secrets ever found in Latin America. The archive most notably sheds light on kidnappings, tortures and murders of tens of thousands of people during the country's 36-year Guatemalan Civil War, which ended in 1996, while the collections date back to the 19th century.

== Guatemalan Civil War ==
In 1954 the democratic interlude in Guatemalan history was ended by the CIA, who overthrew the government and installed the right-wing Guatemalan Army Colonel Carlos Castillo Armas as Head of State and therefore started decades marked by violence. From the mid-1950s through the 1970s, the UN characterized Guatemala as a state increasing repression against its citizens in response to militia unrest and leftist inclinations. In 1982, after a military coup led by Efraín Ríos Montt, the Guatemalan military conducted mass killings at especially alarming rates in response to higher public mobilization in favor of the Revolutionary National Unity of Guatemala (URNG). The CIIDH database documented 18,000 killings by government forces in the year 1982.

The United Nations established the Historical Clarification Commission to investigate the human rights violations during the Guatemalan Civil War. The Commission presented its report, Guatemala: Memory of Silence on February 25, 1999. They found that over 200,000 people were killed, in which "State forces and related paramilitary groups were responsible for 93% of the violations documented.” Public mobilization against the government was highest between 1978 and 1982 and so was the rate of murder and human rights abuses.

The 1996 Peace Accords ended the 36-year Guatemalan Civil War, which was one of the longest and bloodiest in Latin American history. The process began in 1991, leading a gradual process towards democratization. Part of this negotiation was the creation of the Human Rights Accord, signed in March 1994, which created mechanisms for ensuring fair and equal treatment of government dissenters. As became clear from the archive, the army had for years kidnapped, tortured, and killed many citizens associated with anti-government groups.

== Human rights prosecutions ==
The archives have been used to try ex-government officials who committed human rights violations during past authoritarian governments. Former head of the national police, Hector Bol de la Cruz was charged and convicted in the case of Fernando Garcia, a 27-year-old student activist who disappeared on February 18, 1984. Bol de la Cruz was sentenced to 40 years in prison for his role in the kidnapping. Families of roughly 45,000 missing leftists have contacted local rights groups to help them find information about their relatives in the archives, hoping that trials will end decades of impunity for crimes against suspected leftists. As Reuters reports, “Human rights lawyers say success in the cases would bring Guatemala into the ranks of countries like Rwanda and Germany, which held former government officials and military officers responsible for atrocities.”

Efraín Ríos Montt, head of the Guatemalan army, stood trial in 2013 regarding his war crimes with substantial evidence from the Guatemala National Police Archive. After a lengthy appeals process, on 10 May 2013, he was convicted of genocide and crimes against humanity, was sentenced to 80 years imprisonment. 10 days later, an appeals court overturned the decision, forcing a retrial in 2015. A Guatemalan court has stated that he can stand trial for genocide and crimes against humanity, but he cannot be sentenced due to dementia, which prevents him from reasonably defending himself.

== Archiving techniques ==
In 2003, when the Estado Mayor Presidencial (EMP, Presidential General Staff) was dissolved under the terms of the Peace Accords, neither the official government entity charged with document preservation, the Archivo General de Centroamérica (AGCA, General Archive of Central America) or the Procuraduría de los Derechos Humanos (PDH, Human Rights Ombudsman's Office) had sufficient staff or funding to preserve the records. Human rights groups, including the Centro Para la Acción Legal en Derechos Humanos (CALDH, Center for Human Rights Legal Action), the Grupo de Apoyo Mutuo (GAM, Mutual Support Group), the Hijos e Hijas por la Identidad y la Justicia y Contra el Olvido y el Silencio (HIJOS, Sons and Daughters for Identity and Justice and Against Forgetting and Silence), the Oficina de Derechos Humanos del Arzobispado de Guatemala (ODHAG, Human Rights Office of the Archbishop of Guatemala), and Seguridad em Democracia (SEDEM, Security in Democracy) volunteered to assist with the digitizing of records. The urgency to capture images of the documents and lack of formal archival training, meant that the images were not categorized and kept in sequence. GAM and SEDEM remained with the project until it was completed, which prompted the ombudsman Sergio Morales to call on those organizations again when the police archives were discovered. Both NGOs had access to international funding, and were able to gain support from international archivists to assist with the processes. Iduvina Hernández, through her organization, SEDEM, paid for the staff hired to process the records. Over the past 10 years, extensive efforts have revolved around the preservation, identification and description of the archival materials. In order for the documents to be utilized for human rights cases, officials first must make sense of what was found. This task, however, proved to be extensively difficult, especially considering that there are kilometres of documents to look through.

Investigators soon employed the help of database software and statistical analysis, with the assistance of Benetech, a non-proift founded in Palo Alto, California in 2000 with the slogan "Technology Serving Humanity." Benetech does significant work with human rights, revolving around a database called Martus, which helps sort and analyze information that is inputted. The data can also be backed up and secured, a crucial element for human rights projects considering that the information is largely legally and political sensitive. According to Patrick Ball, the organization's chief scientist and director of its human rights program, the Guatemalan archives presented a unique challenge that was "longer-term, more scientifically complex and more politically sensitive" than anything the organization had done before. He continues, “The point of all human rights work is to understand the past, so we can build a future that doesn’t repeat it… we give [organizations] the technical tools to preserve their information…and provide them with technical support to assure that the process is systematic, thorough and scientific.”

== Legacy ==
From July 2009 the ownership of Guatemala National Police Archive moved from the Ministry of Interior to the Ministry of Culture and Sports, under the guidance of the General Archive of Central America (AGCA). The Guatemalan Justice Department is pursuing further prosecutions related to war crimes, hoping that these will help Guatemalan families find closure in times of tragic defeat. "Prosecutions are a great way of creating moral closure—I've participated in many," says Patrick Ball, chief Benetech scientist. "But they aren't what will change a country." In his view, understanding how the National Police went bad and preventing it from happening again—"that's real improvement...Now it's the world's job to dig through the material and make sense of it." The archive, however, will not only be used for prosecutions. Guatemalan scholars, historians, and journalists also want to look the government's record and role in a conflict that destroyed so many lives. The national healing process is not limited to judicial procedure, but instead, as human rights advocates have argued, a collective reckoning across disciplines of thought.

== Bibliography ==
- Archivo Histórico de la Policía Nacional (2013). From Silence to Memory: Revelations of the AHPN (PDF). Eugene, OR: University of Oregon Libraries. ISBN 978-0-985-82041-1.
- Kinzer, Stephen (2013). "Glimmers of Hope in Guatemala". The New York Review of Books. 60 (19).
