= Mario Casariego y Acevedo =

Spanish-born Guatemalan cardinal

His Eminence Mario Casariego y Acevedo CRS
- Cardinal, Archbishop of Guatemala City
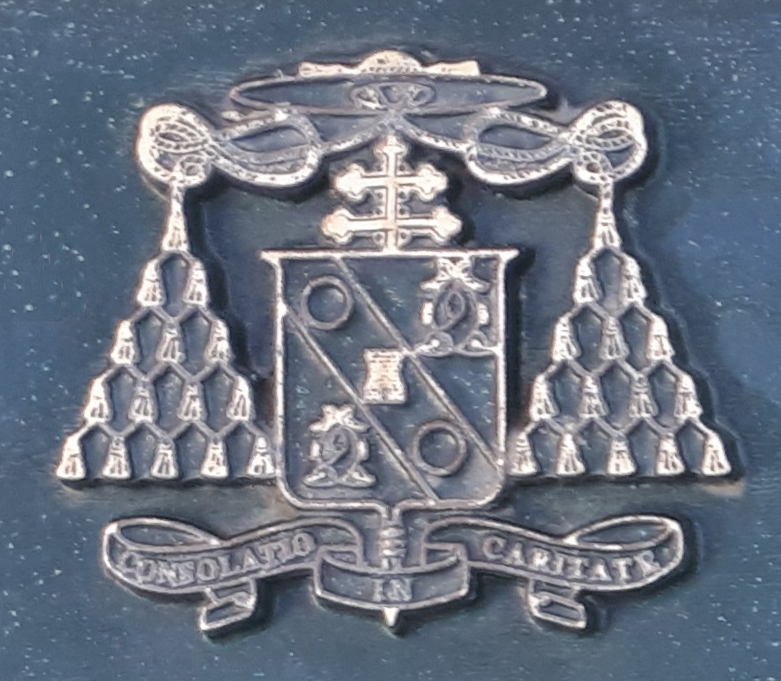
- Church: Catholic Church
- Archdiocese: Guatemala City
- Installed: 12 December 1964
- Term ended: 15 June 1983
- Predecessor: Mariano Rossell y Arellano
- Successor: Próspero Penados del Barrio
- Previous posts: Auxiliary Bishop of Guatemala City (1958–1963); Coadjutor Archbishop of Guatemala (1963–1964)

Orders
- Ordination: 19 July 1936
- Consecration: 27 December 1958 by John XXIII
- Created cardinal: 28 April 1969 by Paul VI
- Rank: Cardinal-Priest

Personal details
- Born: 13 February 1909 Figueras de Castropol, Spain
- Died: 15 June 1983 (aged 74) Guatemala City, Guatemala
- Buried: Cathedral of Guatemala City
- Denomination: Catholic

Styles of Mario Casariego y Acevedo
- Reference style: His Eminence
- Spoken style: Your Eminence
- Informal style: Cardinal
- See: Guatemala City

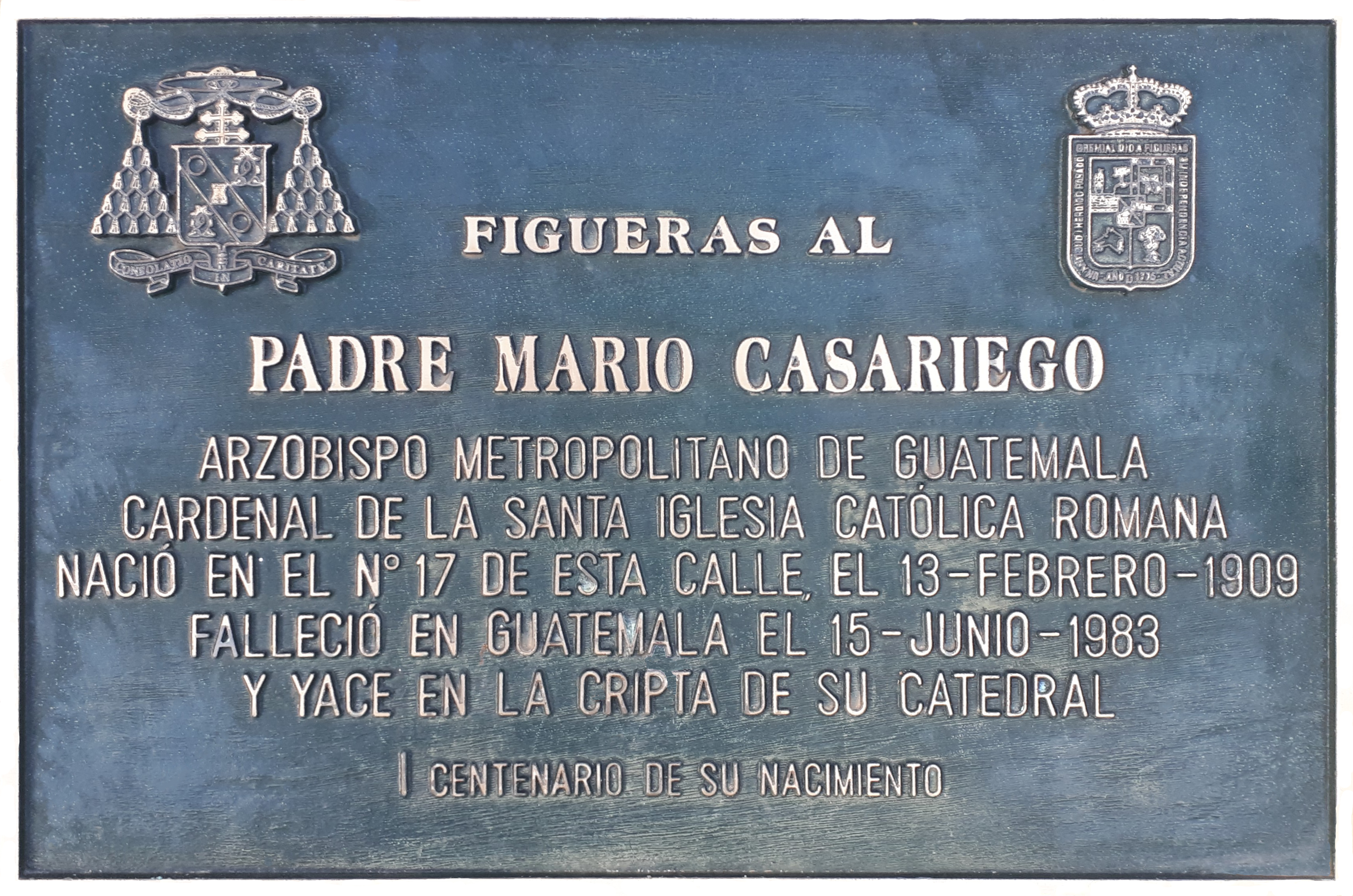
Figueras.

Mario Casariego y Acevedo, CRS (13 February 1909 – 15 June 1983) was a Spanish-born Guatemalan Catholic prelate who served as Archbishop of Santiago de Guatemala from 1964 until his death in 1983. He was elevated to the cardinalate in 1969. He was a member of the Somaschi Fathers.

== Biography ==
Mario Casariego y Acevedo was born in Castropol to Mario and Ágata (née Acevedo) Casariego. He entered the Clerics Regular of Somasca, more commonly known as the Somascan Fathers, in 1924, and made his profession on 3 October 1930. Casariego studied at the Somascan houses of studies in Bergamo and Genoa, and at the Somascan theological seminary in San Salvador.

He was ordained to the priesthood on 19 July 1936, and then did pastoral work at La Ceiba Institute in San Salvador until 1948, whence he became its rector. From 1954 to 1957, Casariego served as a counselor to his religious order. He was also its provincial superior of Central America from 1957 to 1958.

On 15 November 1958, Casariego was appointed Auxiliary Bishop of Guatemala City and Titular Bishop of Pudentiana by Pope John XXIII. He received his episcopal consecration on the following 27 December from Pope John himself, with Bishops Girolamo Bortignon, OFM Cap, and Gioacchino Muccin serving as co-consecrators, in St. Peter's Basilica. Casariego later attended the Second Vatican Council from 1962 to 1965, during which he was promoted to Coadjutor Archbishop of Guatemala City and Titular Archbishop of Perge on 22 September 1963. He succeeded the late Mariano Rossell y Arellano as Archbishop of Guatemala City on 12 December 1964. Casariego was kidnapped for several days by a terrorist group (right extremists from a death squad who wanted to blame Guatemalan leftist guerrilla) in March 1968.

Pope Paul VI created him Cardinal Priest of S. Maria in Aquiro in the consistory of 28 April 1969; Casariego was the first cardinal from Guatemala. He was one of the cardinal electors who participated in the conclaves of August and October 1978, which selected Popes John Paul I and John Paul II respectively.

The Cardinal was a supporter of the government of Guatemala and an opponent of communist movements in the country, so much so that his automobile was accompanied by a radio patrol and two armed motorcycle guards. When asked about execution of some priests involved in far-left guerrilla political activities, Casariego said he knew of no murdered clergy in his country, where most accounts claimed there had been at least ten. Moreover, he also stated, "If you mix in politics, you get what you deserve."

Cardinal Casariego died in Guatemala City, at the age of 74. He is buried in the metropolitan cathedral of the same.

Catholic Church titles
Preceded by Mariano Rossell y Arellano	Archbishop of Guatemala City; 1964–1983	Succeeded by Próspero Penados del Barrio
