= José Ramiro Pellecer Samayoa =

Guatemalan Roman Catholic auxiliary bishop (1929–2022)

The Most Reverend José Ramiro Pellecer Samayoa
- Auxiliary Bishop Emeritus of Guatemala
- Diocese: Guatemala
- Appointed: 28 November 1967
- Term ended: 2 October 2010
- Other post: Titular Bishop of Teglata in Proconsulari
- Previous post: Apostolic Administrator of Escuintla (1982–1986)

Orders
- Ordination: 7 November 1954 by Mariano Rossell y Arellano
- Consecration: 6 Jan 1968 by Bruno Torpigliani

Personal details
- Born: 10 October 1929 Antigua Guatemala, Guatemala
- Died: 14 March 2022 (aged 92) Antigua Guatemala, Guatemala

José Ramiro Pellecer Samayoa (10 October 1929 – 14 March 2022) was a Guatemalan Roman Catholic auxiliary bishop.

Pellecer Samayoa was born in Guatemala and was ordained to the priesthood in 1954. He served as titular bishop of Teglata in Proconsuan and as auxiliary bishop of the Roman Catholic Archdiocese of Guatemala, Guateamala, from 1968 until his retirement in 2010. He also served as apostolic administrator of the Roman Catholic Diocese of Escuintla, Guatemala from 1982 to 1986.

Catholic Church titles
Preceded by Post created	Titular Bishop of Teglata in Proconsulari; 1967–2022	Succeeded by Sede vacante
