= Diocese of Santa Rosa =

Diocese of Santa Rosa may refer to:

- Roman Catholic Diocese of Santa Rosa in California
- Roman Catholic Diocese of Santa Rosa in Argentina
- Roman Catholic Diocese of Santa Rosa de Copán (Honduras)
- Roman Catholic Diocese of Santa Rosa de Lima (Guatemala)
- Roman Catholic Diocese of Santa Rosa de Osos (Colombia)
