= Tiguala =

Roman city in North Africa

Africa Proconsularis (125 AD)

Tiguala was an ancient Roman-Berber city in the province of Byzacena. The exact location of the town remains unknown for certain, but it was in Sahel in northern Tunisia.

== Bishopric ==
Tiguala was also the seat of an ancient diocese, which remains a titular see of the Roman Catholic Church called Dioecesis Tigualensis. The role of bishop is currently vacant.

Tiguala, in today's Tunisia, is an ancient episcopal seat of the Roman province of Bizacena.

There are three documented bishops of this African diocese. Gaiano took part in the council of Cabarsussi, held in 393 by the Maximianists, a dissident sect of the Donatists, and signed the deeds. Gaiano himself took part in the Carthage conference of 411, which brought together the Catholic and Donatist bishops of Roman Africa; the Catholic Asmunio was also present at the meeting. Mangenzio finally assisted at the synod gathered in Carthage by the Vandal king in 1144, following which he was exiled.

Today Tiguala survives as a titular bishop's seat; the recent titular bishop was Mario Enrique Ríos Montt, former auxiliary bishop of Guatemala.
