= Pudenziana =

Catholic titular see in North Africa

Mauretania Caesariensis (125 AD)

The Diocese of Pudentiana is a suppressed and titular see of the Roman Catholic Church. It was centered on the Roman town of Pudentiana that flourished in the province of Numidia, Roman North Africa, through the Vandal Kingdom and Roman Empire of late antiquity.

== History ==
At the Conference of Carthage of 411, the Catholic and Donatists of Roman North Africa debated. The records of the Council show that the town was represented by the Donatist Cresconius, who reported that the diocese had no Catholic bishop. The proceedings of the conference tell, however, that Auronio of Macomades, who was a fervent Catholic, answered Cresconius saying that Pudenziana had had a Catholic bishop named Memmiano and that he had succeeded another bishop with the same name, but that both had died. Auronio of Macomades also accused Cresconi of having destroyed four Catholic basilicas.

Peregrino participated in the synod assembled in Carthage in 484 by the Vandal King Huneric, after which Peregrino was exiled.

In 591, Gregory the Great ordered Bishop Colombo of Nicives to convene a council to judge the work of Massimiano of Pudenziana, accused by his deacons of accepting bribes from donatists.

The diocese lasted until the Muslim conquest of the Maghreb. Today Pudenziana survives as a titular bishopric. Two holders of the titular see became cardinals: Mario Casariego y Acevedo and Óscar Rodríguez Maradiaga. The most recent bishop was György Snell, auxiliary bishop of Esztergom-Budapest.

== Bishops ==
- Robert, Cardinal Titular of St. Pudentiana, (d.1294)
- Mario Casariego y Acevedo (1958–1963)
- Victor Garaygordóbil Berrizbeitia (1963–1978)
- Óscar Rodríguez Maradiaga, (1978–1993), Archbishop of Tegucigalpa
- Peter William Ingham (1993–2001), Bishop of Wollongong
- Sérgio Aparecido Colombo (2001– 2003),
- László Kiss-Rigó (2004–2006),
- Shelton Fabre (2006–2013)
- György Snell (20 Oct 2014 – 26 February 2021)
- Carlos Godoy Labraña (22 June 2021).
