= Iglesia de Cristo Pinares del Nort =

Church in Guatemala City, Guatemala

The Iglesia de Cristo Pinares del Nort is a church in Guatemala City, Guatemala. It is located in Zone 18 of the city.

== See also ==
- Roman Catholic Archdiocese of Santiago de Guatemala
