= Próspero Penados del Barrio =

Guatemalan prelate (1925-2005)

His Excellency Próspero Penados del Barrio
- Archbishop of Guatemala City
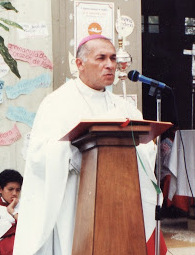
- Church: Roman Catholic Church
- Archdiocese: Archbishop of Guatemala City
- Province: Guatemala
- Metropolis: Guatemala
- Installed: 1 December 1983
- Predecessor: Mario Casariego y Acevedo
- Other post: Bishop of San Marcos

Orders
- Ordination: 24 March 1951
- Consecration: 7 December 1971

Personal details
- Born: 28 August 1925 Flores, Guatemala
- Died: 13 May 2005 (aged 79) Guatemala City

Próspero Penados del Barrio (August 28, 1925 – May 13, 2005) was a Guatemalan prelate of the Roman Catholic Church. He was the Archbishop of Guatemala City, Guatemala from 1983 to 2001, and was involved in the peace negotiations during the last years of the Guatemalan Civil War.

== Biography ==
Born in Flores, Petén, Penados studied at the Seminario de Santiago in Guatemala and later at the Seminary of New Orleans, United States, to become a priest. He was ordained priest on March 24, 1951, in Rome and continued to study at the Roman Gregorianum, obtaining a degree in theology.

He returned to Guatemala to serve as auxiliary bishop of the diocese of San Marcos starting in 1966, and as its titular bishop from 1971 until 1983. In 1982, he was elected president of the Conferencia Episcopal de Guatemala, a charge he occupied until 1986.

On December 1, 1983, Penados was appointed as the XVII Metropolitan Archbishop of Guatemala City and prelate of Esquipulas by Pope John Paul II. During his years of service as the Guatemalan Archbishop, Penados changed the conservative approach of the Catholic Church towards the political scene of the nation, which at the time was suffering some of the most difficult years of the Civil War. He had a key role in the peace negotiations by denouncing many human rights abuses during past military regimes and by the Guatemalan Army, and by his support of human rights activism and victims of the Guatemalan Genocide. He was the founder of the Oficina de Derechos Humanos del Arzobispado de Guatemala (ODHA / Office of Human Rights of the Archbishopric) in 1990.

Penados resigned from his archiepiscopal office in 2000, and was succeeded by Rodolfo Quezada Toruño as archbishop. He died aged 79 in Guatemala City, and was buried at the Cathedral of Guatemala City.

Preceded by Mario Casariego y Acevedo	Archbishop of Guatemala City; 1983–2001	Succeeded by Rodolfo Quezada Toruño
