= Helen Mack Chang =

Guatemalan activist

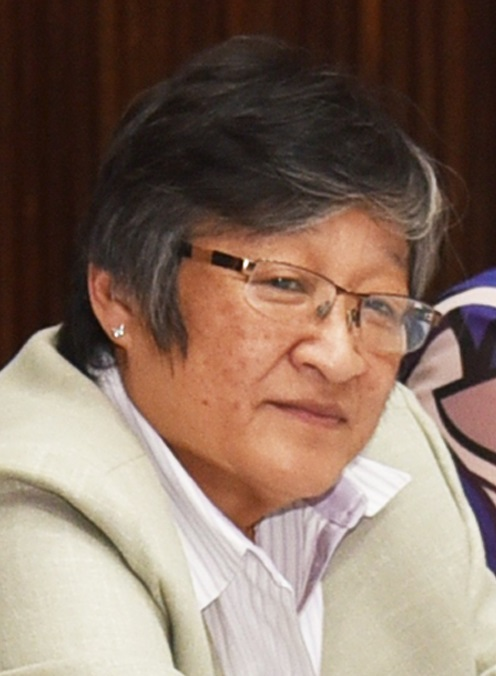
Helen Mack Chang in 2017

Helen Beatriz Mack Chang (born January 19th 1952) is a Guatemalan businesswoman and human rights activist. She became an outspoken advocate for human rights after her sister, anthropologist Myrna Mack Chang, was assassinated by the Guatemalan military on September 11th 1990. She pursued prosecution of her sister's assailants, including ground-breaking cases in the Inter-American Court of Human Rights, achieving convictions of one assailant and a high-ranking colonel. The Guatemalan government acknowledged responsibility in 2004 and has paid compensation to Mack and her family.

In 1992 Mack received the Right Livelihood Award in Sweden, and has received other awards for her human rights work. In 1993 she established the Myrna Mack Foundation, to support the prosecution of her sister's murder and do other work for human rights, establishing programs and support for victims. In 2010, she was appointed by President Álvaro Colom to lead investigations into continuing police corruption and recommend changes.

== Early life and education ==
Helen Mack Chang was born in Retalhuleu in south-west Guatemala. Her mother and her father were children of chinese immigrants. She had an older sister, Myrna, who became an anthropologist.

== Human rights activist ==
During the Guatemalan civil war, Mack's sister Myrna, worked with indigenous Mayan rural peoples. She documented their displacement by fighting and the scale of the government's attacks on them. Myrna was stabbed to death in 1990 near her office in Guatemala City by unknown assailants, believed to be ordered by a government that wanted to silence her public criticism.

Beginning in 1991, Mack pursued the prosecution in Guatemala of those suspected of the crime, which included several men trained at the US Army School of the Americas (later renamed the Western Hemisphere Institute for Security Cooperation).

After more than a decade of seeking justice in Guatemala, Mack took the case to the Inter-American Commission on Human Rights in Washington, DC, and later to the Inter-American Court in Costa Rica. Two years later, one of Myrna's killers, former Army Sergeant Noel de Jesús Beteta, was convicted in a groundbreaking decision. The court sentenced him to 25 years in prison.

The prosecution of the case resulted in the trial of two colonels and a general "as the intellectual authors of the murder; the highest-ranking officials in Guatemala ever to be tried for human rights violations." In 2002, Colonel Juan Valencia Osorio, was convicted in absentia for his role in ordering her murder, and sentenced to 30 years in prison. The decision was overturned in an appeals court in 2003. The case has been taken to the Guatemalan Supreme Court. This case was the first of its kind in Guatemala and set a precedent for similar human rights cases.

In 1993 Mack founded and became the executive director of the Myrna Mack Foundation in Guatemala City. In addition to pursuing justice for her sister Myrna through national and international courts, the foundation engages in a broad array of other activities and programs to promote human rights in Guatemala. It supports victims of the war, as well as promotes political and economic development among the indigenous peoples.

Under President Álvaro Colom's government, Mack was appointed in 2010 "to lead investigations into police corruption. In one of her first statements after her appointment, she asserted that the low pay and poor work conditions of Guatemala's police were key catalysts in corruption and must be addressed."

== Awards ==
- 2011, she received the insignia of Chevalier of the Legion d'honneur by the Ambassador of France in Guatemala
- 2010, the Judith Lee Stronach Human Rights Award, from the Center for Justice and Accountability.
- 2005, Notre Dame (University) Prize for Distinguished Public Service in Latin America.
- 1992, the Right Livelihood Award "for her personal courage and persistence in seeking justice and an end to the impunity of political murderers."

== See also ==
- Myrna Mack Chang
- Guatemalan Civil War
