= International Association of Judges =

The International Association of Judges (IAJ) is a professional, non-political, international organization of currently (2026) over 90 national associations of judges.

== History ==
It was founded in Salzburg in 1953 and has its headquarters in Rome.

The IAJ promotes the Rule of Law and the Independence of the Judiciary. Its members consist of national associations or representative groups from approximately 90 countries. The IAJ board has eight members from all continents and a central council with all its 90 countries. It adopted a new Universal Charter of the Judge at its annual meeting in 2017 in Santiago Chile.

The IAJ is the oldest international organization of judges. It is focused on judicial independence as a guarantee of human rights, and in this capacity holds consultant status with the Council of Europe, the International Labor Organization and ECOSOC. The association works also with judicial education with four study commissions on constitutional law, civil, criminal and labor law.

== Award ==
In 2022 the IAJ established a Judicial Independence Award. In the first year three judges were given the award including Erica Aifan of Guatemala who was persecuted after seeking out corruption. The three recognised in 2023 included Azar Sarem who was driven out of Afghanistan by the Taliban. In 2024 the award went to the American Bar Association Rule of Law Initiative for judicial independence. UN Special Rapporteur Margaret Satterthwaite and Norma Lucía Piña Hernández, former President of the Supreme Court of Mexico were identified in 2025.
