= Costantino Cristiano Luna Pianegonda =

Costantino Cristiano Luna Pianegonda O.F.M.
- Bishop of Zacapa
- Church: Catholic Church
- Diocese: Diocese of Zacapa
- In office: 30 November 1955 – 16 February 1980
- Predecessor: Diocese erected
- Successor: Rodolfo Quezada Toruño

Orders
- Ordination: 1 July 1934
- Consecration: 6 January 1956 by Gennaro Verolino

Personal details
- Born: 10 December 1910 Recoaro Terme, Province of Vicenza, Kingdom of Italy
- Died: 29 August 1997 (aged 86) Zacapa, Zacapa Department, Guatemala

Costantino Cristiano Luna Pianegonda (10 December 1910, Recoaro Terme – 29 August 1997, Zacapa) was an Italian Franciscan friar and clergyman. He was ordained priest by the Franciscans on 1 July 1934 before being appointed first bishop of Zacapa in the Archdiocese of Guatemala on 30 November 1955. He was enthroned on 6 January 1956 by archbishop Gennaro Verolino, then apostolic nuncio in Guatemala. He resigned on 16 February 1980 and remained a bishop emeritus of the diocese until his death.

== Sources ==
- David M. Cheney. "Bishop Costantino Cristiano Luna Pianegonda [Catholic-Hierarchy]". catholic-hierarchy.org. ^{[self-published]}
