= Mario Enrique Ríos Montt =

Guatemalan Catholic prelate (1932–2026)

His Excellency Mario Enrique Ríos Montt
- Auxiliary Bishop Emeritus of Guatemala
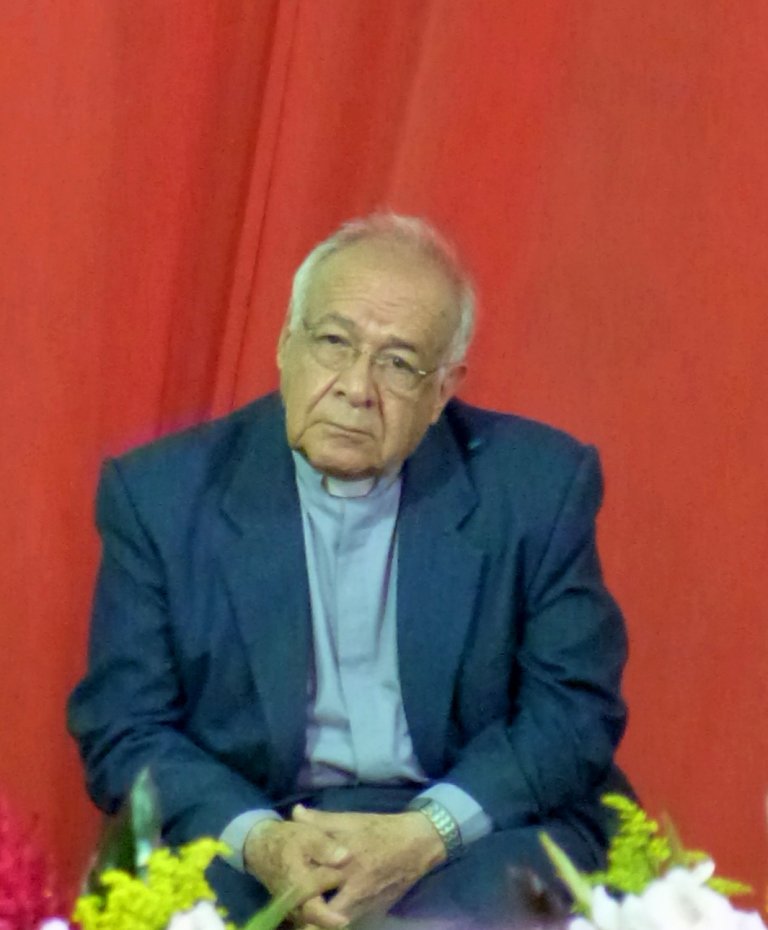
- Archdiocese: Guatemala
- Appointed: 24 January 1987
- Installed: 24 January 1987
- Term ended: 2 October 2010
- Predecessor: —
- Successor: —
- Other posts: Titular Bishop of Tiguala (1974–2026); Apostolic Administrator of Izabal (2011–2013)
- Previous post: Prelate of Escuintla (1974–1984)

Orders
- Ordination: 12 July 1959 by Humberto Lara Mejía
- Consecration: 27 September 1974 by Emanuele Gerada, José Eduardo Alvarez Ramírez and Victor Hugo Martínez Contreras

Personal details
- Born: 17 March 1932 Huehuetenango, Guatemala
- Died: 5 April 2026 (aged 94) Guatemala City, Guatemala
- Denomination: Roman Catholic

Mario Enrique Ríos Montt, (Note: In this name that follows Hispanic American naming customs, the first or paternal surname is Ríos and the second or maternal family name is Montt.) C.M. (17 March 1932 – 5 April 2026) was a Guatemalan Roman Catholic prelate, public figure and human rights activist. He served as an auxiliary bishop of the Roman Catholic Archdiocese of Guatemala and was the brother of former general Efraín Ríos Montt, a dictator accused of genocide in Guatemala during the period when he was in power from March 1982 to August 1983.

== Biography ==
=== Early years and political views ===
Mario Ríos Montt was born in Huehuetenango on 17 March 1932, in a large family of 13 children of a ruined rural merchant. Biographers of the family Ríos Montt contrasted Mario Enrique to his elder brother José Efraín, saying that Efraín liked maps and military parades; Mario every morning went to Mass and prayed after school with the priests.

He entered in the Pauline Fathers and was ordained priest on 12 July 1959. On 13 July 1974, Montt was appointed titular bishop of Tiguala and prelate of Escuintla by Pope Paul VI and was ordained bishop on 27 September of the same year by Apostolic nuncio um Guatemala, Archbishop Emanuele Gerada. His co-consecrators were the Bishop of San Miguel, José Eduardo Alvarez Ramírez, CM, and Victor Hugo Martínez Contreras, Auxiliary Bishop of the Huehuetenango.

Ríos Montt adopted the left-oriented liberation theology (which opposed him to his elder brother Efraín who converted himself to evangelicalism from Catholicism). He still supported anti-government political speeches of the Guatemalan Catholic Church - protests against repression, calls for active social policies and the fight against poverty.

=== Political confrontation with his brother ===
On 23 March 1982, as a result of a military coup to power in Guatemala came the military junta, led by Efraín Ríos Montt, who took office as president. The regime of ultra-right dictatorship was established and a civil war and political repression have reached unprecedented scale. At the same time, the ruling group was distinguished by a fanatical Protestant evangelism and was suspicious of the Catholic population.

Under the Riosmontist regime, Mario Ríos Montt publicly opposed the repressive policies of his elder brother. On the advice of the head of state, the titular bishop had to leave the country temporarily and move to Italy.

=== Bishop and human rights ===
After the change of power in August 1983, Ríos Montt returned to Guatemala and, on 3 March 1984, resigned as prelate of Escuintla.

On 24 January 1987, he was appointed Auxiliary Bishop of the Archdiocese of Guatemala and since 1998 he was the Vicar of Pastoral of the same.

On 26 April 1998, Bishop Juan Gerardi was assassinated, two days after publishing his report Guatemala: Never Again, where he presented evidence forty years of repression in that country: 200,000 Indigenous people killed and one million exiled. Nine out of ten victims were unarmed, mostly indigenous, civilians. More than 90% of the crimes had been the responsibility of the Guatemalan State. Mario Enrique Ríos Montt took over in this year his duties in the Office of Human Rights of the Archdiocese of Guatemala (ODHA) and became an influential and powerful opponent of his brother.

Montt criticized the former military regimes for brutality and civil governments for corruption.

In the socio-political aspect, Mario Enrique Ríos Montt was the opponent of Jose Efraín Rios Montt. However, the brothers met at family celebrations and communicated in a friendly manner, trying to avoid discussing politics.

=== Retirement ===
On 2 October 2010, Pope Benedict XVI accepted his resignation for reasons of age and on 26 July 2011, Montt was appointed apostolic administrator of the Vicariate of Izabal, where he replaced Bishop Gabriel Peñate Rodríguez till 9 February 2013.

Ríos Montt died on 5 April 2026, at the age of 94.

== Notes ==
Catholic Church titles
Preceded by —	Auxiliary Bishop of Guatemala; 1987–2010	Succeeded by —
Preceded by José Julio Aguilar García	Prelate of Escuintla; 1974–1984	Succeeded by Fernando Claudio Gamalero González
Preceded by Aloysius Joseph Willinger	Titular Bishop of Tiguala; 1974–2026	Succeeded by Vacant
