= Iglesia Católica Sagrado Corazón de Jesus =

Church in Guatemala City, Guatemala

The Iglésia Católica Sagrado Corazón de Jesus is a church in Guatemala City, Guatemala.

== See also ==
- Roman Catholic Archdiocese of Santiago de Guatemala
