= Diocese of San Francisco de Asís de Jutiapa =

Roman Catholic diocese in Guatemala

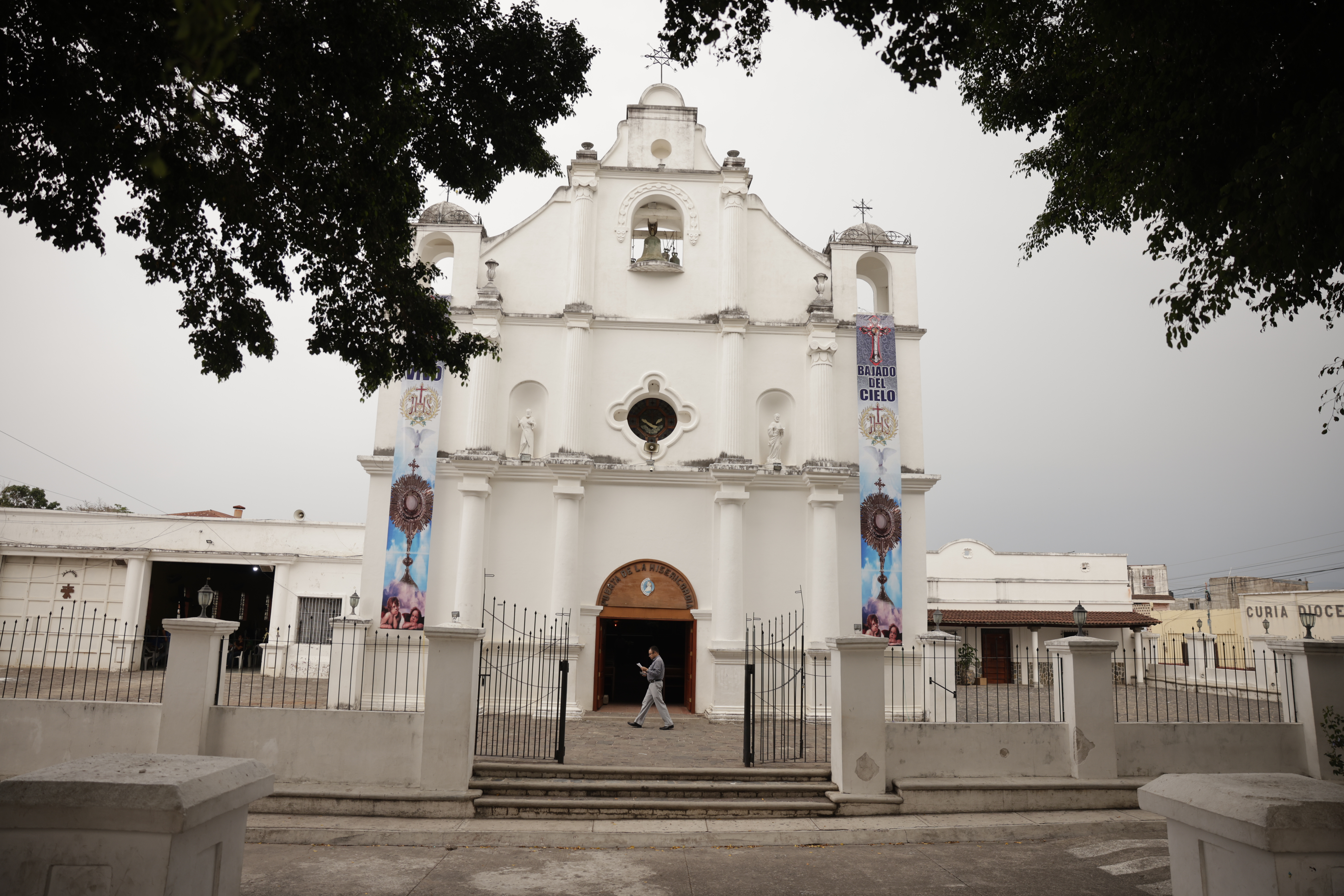

Location
- Country: Guatemala
- Ecclesiastical province: Santiago de Guatemala

Information
- Formation: 25 January 2016
- Denomination: Catholic Church
- Sui iuris church: Latin Church
- Rite: Roman Rite

Current leadership
- Pope: Leo XIV
- Bishop: Antonio Calderón Cruz
- Metropolitan Archbishop: Gonzalo de Villa y Vásquez, S.J.

The Diocese of San Francisco de Asís de Jutiapa is a Latin Church ecclesiastical territory or diocese of the Catholic Church in Guatemala. It is a suffragan diocese in the ecclesiastical province of the Archdiocese of Santiago de Guatemala. The diocese's name refers to Francis of Assisi.

Its cathedral is the Catedral San Cristóbal in the episcopal see of Jutiapa, southwestern Guatemala.

== History ==
Established on 25 January 2016 as the Diocese of San Francisco de Asís de Jutiapa on territory split off from the Diocese of Jalapa.

== Episcopal ordinaries ==
Bishops of San Francisco de Asís de Jutiapa

- Bishop Antonio Calderón Cruz (2016.01.25 – ...)
