= Diocese of Zacapa y Santo Cristo de Esquipulas =

Roman Catholic diocese in Guatemala

Diocese of Zacapa y Santo Cristo de Esquipulas Dioecesis Zacapensis y de Esquipulas Diócesis de Zacapa y Santo Cristo de Esquipulas
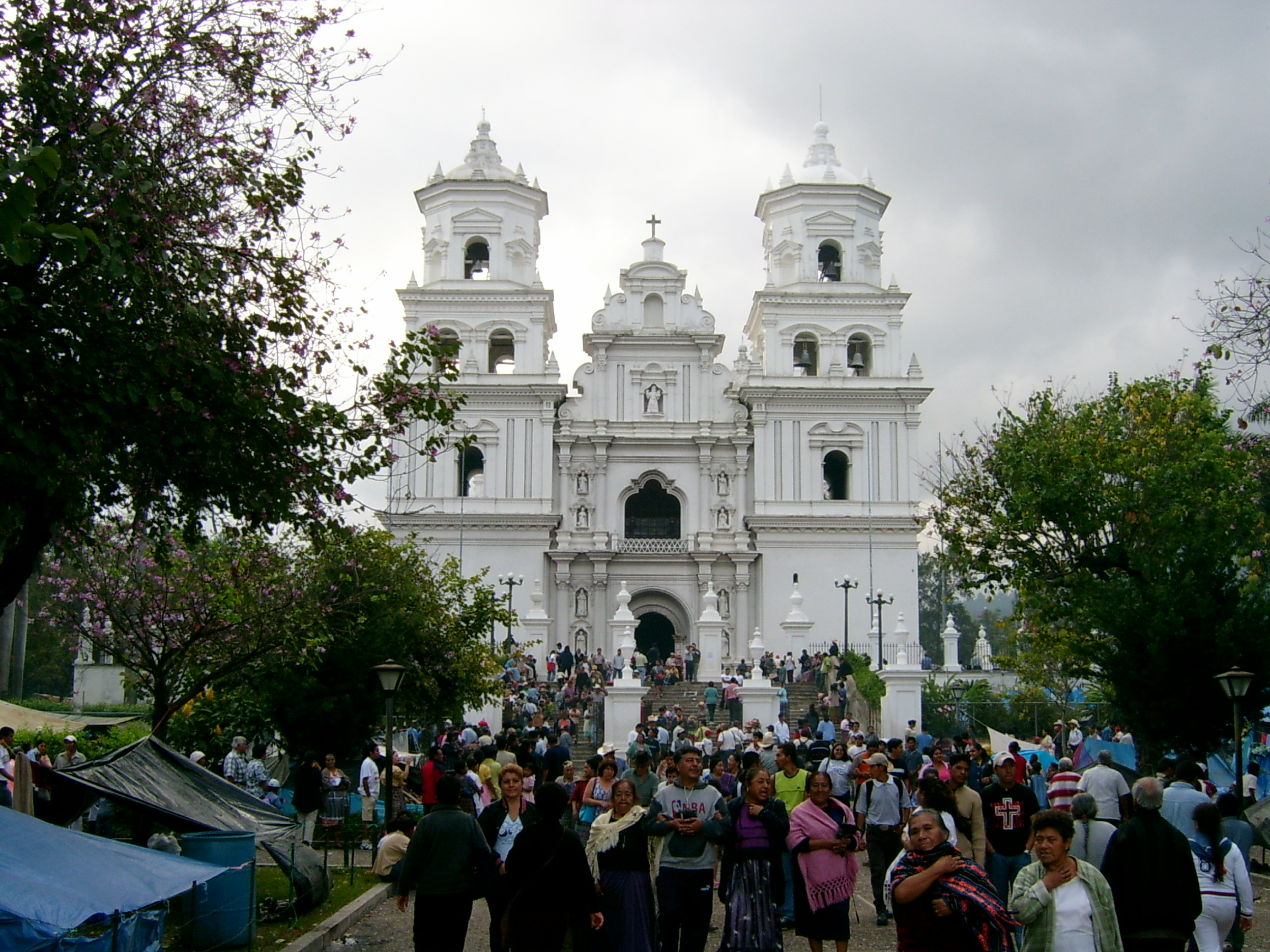
- Basílica del Cristo Negro de Esquipulas

Location
- Country: Guatemala
- Metropolitan: Archdiocese of Santiago de Guatemala
- Headquarters: Zacapa, Zacapa Department, Guatemala

Statistics
- Area: 5,066 km^{2} (1,956 sq mi)
- Population: Total; Catholics: (as of 2023); 852,620; 648,900 (76.1%)
- Parishes: 30

Information
- Denomination: Catholic Church
- Sui iuris church: Latin Church
- Rite: Roman Rite
- Established: 10 March 1951; 75 years ago
- Cathedral: Catedral San Pedro
- Co-cathedral: Basílica del Cristo Negro de Esquipulas
- Patron saint: Our Lady of the Rosary
- Secular priests: 38 (24 Diocesan, 14 Religious Orders)

Current leadership
- Pope: Leo XIV
- Bishop: Sede vacante
- Metropolitan Archbishop: Gonzalo de Villa y Vásquez, S.J.

The Roman Catholic Diocese of Zacapa (y Santo Cristo de Esquipulas) is a Latin suffragan diocese in the ecclesiastical province of the Archdiocese of Guatemala.

Its cathedral episcopal see is catedral San Pedro (dedicated to saint Peter), in Zacapa. It also had a virtual Co-cathedral, Basílica del Cristo Negro de Esquipulas, which is officially still the cathedral of the Territorial Prelature of Santo Cristo de Esquipulas.

== History ==
It was erected 10 March 1951, as the Diocese of Zacapa, on territory split off from the Archdiocese of Guatemala (still its Metropolitan].

On 16 September 1956, it lost territory to establish the Territorial Prelature of Santo Cristo de Esquipulas, and again on 30 April 1968 to establish the then Apostolic Administration of Izabal.

It was (re)united aeque principaliter (in permanent personal union) with the Territorial Prelature of Santo Cristo de Esquipulas on 24 June 1986 and since assumed the name Diocese of Zacapa y Santo Cristo de Esquipulas.

It enjoyed a papal visit from Pope John Paul II in February 1996.

== Leadership ==
=== Bishops of Zacapa ===
- Costantino Cristiano Luna Pianegonda, O.F.M. (30 November 1955 – 16 February 1980), resigned
- Rodolfo Quezada Toruño (16 February 1980 – 24 June 1986 see below)

=== Bishops of Zacapa y Santo Cristo de Esquipulas ===
- Rodolfo Quezada Toruño (see above 24 June 1986 – 19 June 2001), appointed Archbishop of Guatemala
  - Apostolic Administrator José Aníbal Casasola Sosa (25 July 2001 – 13 May 2004)
- José Aníbal Casasola Sosa (13 May 2004 – 27 April 2007)
- Rosolino Bianchetti Boffelli (20 November 2008 – 14 September 2012), appointed Bishop of Quiché
- Ángel Antonio Recinos Lemus (22 February 2016 – 24 March 2026), appointed Bishop of Escuintla

=== Coadjutor bishop ===
- Rodolfo Quezada Toruño (1975-1980), succeeded

=== Auxiliary bishop ===
- Rodolfo Quezada Toruño (1972-1975), appointed Coadjutor Bishop of Zacapa

=== Other priest of this diocese who became bishop ===
- Domingo Buezo Leiva (1988-2013), appointed Vicar Apostolic of Izabal in 2013

== External links and references ==
- "Diocese of Zacapa y Santo Cristo de Esquipulas". Catholic-Hierarchy.

== Sources and external links ==
- GigaCatholic, with incumbent biography links
