= Historical Clarification Commission =

Guatemalan government commission

The Commission for Historical Clarification (Spanish: Comisión para el Esclarecimiento Histórico; abbreviated CEH) was a Guatemalan government commission established in 1994 in order to investigate atrocities and human rights violations committed during the Guatemalan Civil War, which began in 1962 and ended in the late 1990s with United Nations-facilitated peace accords. The commission operated under a two-year mandate, from 1997 to 1999, and employed three commissioners: one Guatemalan man, one male non-national, and one Mayan woman. The mandate of the commission was not to judge but to clarify the past with "objectivity, equity and impartiality."

Among other things, the commission revealed that over 200,000 people were killed or disappeared during the conflict and attributed 93% of the violations to state forces and related paramilitary groups. The commission noted that during the conflict the distinction between combatant and non-combatant was not respected and as a result many children, priests, indigenous leaders, and innocent women and men were killed. The CEH aimed to instill national harmony, promote peace, foster a culture of mutual respect regarding human rights, and preserve the memory of the conflict's victims.

== Historical context of the conflict ==
Guatemala is a multiethnic, pluricultural, and multilingual nation and has been plagued by violence and exclusion directed at the poorest and most vulnerable, specifically the indigenous Mayan communities. A colonial legacy left power in the hands of an elite minority, much like many other Latin American countries. Repression was omnipresent—specifically with regard to insurgent groups.

In 1954 Guatemala's democratically elected President Jacobo Árbenz was overthrown by a US-backed right-wing military dictator, Carlos Castillo Armas, in a military coup d'état. The 36-year Guatemalan civil war began in the early 1960s with a military rebellion by left-wing insurgency groups against the new regime. In response, the Guatemalan government employed counter-insurgency tactics, and state-based violence and terror began to escalate. The conflict intensified in the 1970s and saw the height of its destruction and casualties between 1979 and 1984. Guatemala's civil war concluded with the 1996 Oslo Agreement which declared a formal ceasefire between the Guatemalan government and the Guatemalan National Revolutionary Unity (Unidad Revolucionaria Nacional Guatemalteca, URNG) forces.

There is a plethora of root causes of Guatemala's 36-year civil war. Guatemala's economy, heavily based on coffee and sugar exports, relied on the exploitation of indigenous labour and land. A democratic regime and Marxist insurgencies posed a direct threat to the political and economic elite and to their main trading partner—the United States. As a result, the state magnified the military threat posed by the insurgency and launched attacks that led to civilian massacres and violations of human rights of any suspected "supporters" of the guerrillas. In addition, in the context of the Cold War, anti-communist sentiment permeated the US–Guatemalan discourse, and thus counterinsurgency against the Marxist insurgency groups was more severe.

== The CEH ==
=== Creation ===
In June 1994 the Guatemalan government and the URNG, under advisory by the UN Secretary-General and the United Nations Verification Mission in Guatemala (MINUGUA), signed the "Agreement on the establishment of the Commission to clarify past human rights violations and acts of violence that have caused the Guatemalan population to suffer," which led to the creation of the CEH. Aside from pressure from the UN Secretary-General to work towards truth and reconciliation, the road to the CEH was influenced by the Catholic Church—specifically when it created the Human Rights Office of the Archdiocese of Guatemala (ODHA) in the mid 1990s.

=== Mandate ===
With a belief that uncovering the truth would make national reconciliation a possibility and authentic democracy a reality, the CEH aimed not to judge but to clarify the past with "objectivity, equity and impartiality." The commission aimed to ask and answer questions such as:

- Why were civilians—particularly Mayans—targeted?
- Why did defenseless children suffer?
- Why were basic rules of humanitarian law ignored or not respected?

Instillation of national harmony, promotion of peace, the creation of a culture of mutual respect regarding human rights, and the preservation of the memory of the victims were of paramount importance to the commission. Guatemalans and external actors in favor of the commission's work wanted to record Guatemala's bloody past. There is awareness with regard to the systematic violation of human rights during the civil war, but the acts committed and their consequences have yet to become entrenched in the national consciousness and historical memory of Guatemalans.

=== Commission logistics ===
The commission's work lasted two years, from February 1997 to February 1999. Its three commissioners were:

- German law professor Christian Tomuschat, of Berlin's Humboldt University, named by the UN Secretary-General to chair the CEH
- Otilia Lux de Coti, a Mayan scholar nominated by Tomuschat with the agreement of the parties
- Edgar Alfredo Balsells Tojo, a lawyer also nominated by Tomuschat with the agreement of the parties

The process of the commission was complex and was by no means solely a national effort. Throughout the two-year mandate of the commission, multiple countries—including Austria, Canada, Germany and the United Kingdom—provided monetary, political, and moral support. The US provided declassified documents crucial to the commission, and the UN Secretary-General promoted the project and facilitated the contribution of monetary resources and expert knowledge through various UN bodies.

The commission, as outlined in its charter, was to be composed of the current moderator of the peace negotiations (appointed by the UN Secretary-General), one Guatemalan citizen (appointed by the aforementioned moderator and agreed upon by both parties), and one academic (selected by the monitor from a list submitted by Guatemalan university presidents and approved by both parties). At the height of the investigations, the commission had a staff of 269 and 14 field offices. The staff consisted of both national and international commissioners, who accounted for just under half of employees. By the end of the CEH's duration, 2,000 communities had been visited, and testimonies were received from approximately 20,000 people.

=== Restrictions ===
The restrictions on the Commission's mandate were as follows: responsibility could not be attributed to any individual—naming names was not allowed; the findings and conclusions of the CEH could not have judicial repercussions; and the commission would have a six-month mandate, extendable to 18 months. The final restriction was not upheld as the commission duration lasted two years. In addition, the CEH had no subpoena powers.

=== Presentation ===
The CEH's report, Memory of Silence (Memoria del Silencio), was presented in February 1999 in a 12-volume report to representatives of the URNG and the Guatemalan government and to Kofi Annan, the UN Secretary-General. The report is available online for public access in both English and Spanish.

== Report findings ==
For the CEH it was clear that to understand the past and move forward on a trajectory for peace would require an in-depth analysis of the causes of the civil war. They concluded that the four main causes of the conflict were as follows: Structural injustice, closing of free, public spaces, anti-democracy trajectory, Cold War context and international influence.

The CEH also investigated Guatemala's systemic problems. They concluded that the structure and nature of economic, cultural, and social relations in Guatemala were marked by profound exclusion, antagonism, and conflict—a reflection of its colonial history. In addition, they found that the absence of effective state social policy had accentuated the historical dynamic of exclusion. In fact, they state, most recent state policy had produced inequality, and endemic institutional weakness had perpetuated the discrepancies among demographics. Leading up to the conflict, civil and political rights were suppressed and public venues were closed to prevent the spread of anti-government sentiment and other revolutionary thinking. During the armed conflict, the incapacity of the state to deal with political instability led to the creation of an intricate system of repression including an underground, illegal punitive system. Military intelligence was the conflict's driving force. Impunity permeated Guatemala's political system.

=== Human rights violations: statistics ===
The principal focus of the CEH was human rights violations during the civil war. They registered a total of 42,275 casualties by human rights violations and acts of violence; of this number, 23,671 were arbitrarily executed and 6,159 were forcibly disappeared. Estimates of those killed or disappeared during the conflict reach as high as 200,000. In terms of demographics, the CEH found that 83% of "fully identified" victims were Mayan and 17% Ladino. 93% of the violations were attributed to state forces and related paramilitary groups and 3% to insurgency groups. Among the victims of arbitrary execution, forced disappearance, torture, rape, and other violations of fundamental rights were children, priests, indigenous leaders, and non-combatant women and men with no ties to insurgency groups.

== Recommendations ==
The CEH highlighted seven main recommendations for Guatemala's government as it embarked upon a path of peace and reconciliation. These recommendations were created in accordance with the UN draft "Basic Principles and Guidelines on the Right to a Remedy and Reparations for Victims of Violation of International Human Rights and Humanitarian Law" (E/CN.4/Sub2/1996/17).

1. Take measures to preserve the memory of the victims
2. Those responsible for the crimes should assume responsibility
3. Restoration of material possessions and economic compensation
4. Conduct investigations into all known forced disappearances
5. Creation of an immediate exhumation policy of all victims' remains
6. Foster mutual respect and observance of human rights
7. Strengthen the democratic process (judicial and military reform)

Throughout the recommendations the CEH highlights the need for indigenous political participation.

== Aftermath ==
=== Implementation of recommendations ===
The Guatemalan army was opposed to many human rights aspects of the 1996 Peace Accords including the creation and work of the CEH. They argued that these tools would be used by the insurgency groups to garner political support and military strength. However, support for accords and commissions focused on human rights were strongly supported by the URNG, the Catholic Church, and various civil society and human rights groups. Problems the commission faced were primarily based on political and ideological disagreements. In fact, although the CEH finally came to fruition, its progress was stalled when the army stated its clear opposition to the commission and the URNG affirmed its inclusion as non-negotiable.

Since the report was released in 1999, progress has been made with regard to compliance of the aforementioned recommendations. In 2000 Guatemala ratified the Inter-American Convention on Forced Disappearances; the Additional Protocol to the American Convention on Human Rights regarding social, economic, and cultural rights; and the Optional Protocol of the International Covenant on Civil and Political Rights. In 2002 it ratified the Optional Protocol of the Convention on the Rights of the Child, regarding the participation of children in armed conflicts, and in 2003 recognized the competence of the Committee Against Torture to receive individual complaints. Although these accords have been signed and ratified, their content has yet to be integrated into current and future domestic plans. In addition, in 2003, 20 years after the majority of human rights violations occurred, a National Reparations Program was established.

In accordance with the CEH's statement that the state was obligated to investigate crimes committed during the conflict, José Efraín Ríos Montt—the former military dictator—was tried and convicted for genocide and crimes against humanity. However, for multiple reasons his trial was suspended until January 2015, then further suspended until January 2016. A closed-door trial began in March 2016. Ríos Montt died while the trial was still ongoing.

=== Critiques and controversy ===
One of the most controversial revelations of the commission was its statement that at no time during the conflict did guerrilla groups have the military potential to pose an immediate threat to the state or its army. The state was well aware that the insurgency did not represent a real threat to Guatemalan political order. It has been argued that they deliberately magnified the military threat of the insurgency to justify the crimes they committed.

In the several years following the release of the CEH's report, scholars have analyzed its effectiveness in preventing conflict and creating national harmony as highlighted in the commission's mandate. Jeff Corntassel and Cindy Holder argue that state-facilitated truth mechanisms are fundamentally flawed if they do not address historic and ongoing injustices against indigenous groups; this is particularly relevant in Guatemala considering 83% of the victims in the conflict were indigenous. In addition, Rachel Sieder has investigated judicial reform and violence in postwar Guatemala and states that homicide rates in fact were higher in 2011 than during the height of the armed conflict. The effectiveness of the CEH is highly contested; however, it has seen successes, particularly with the opening of spaces like "La casa de la memoria" which exist to preserve the memory of the conflict's victims.

== See also ==
- List of truth and reconciliation commissions
- Commission on the Truth for El Salvador
- Guatemala National Police Archives
- Guatemalan genocide
