= Selamselae =

Africa Proconsularis (125 AD)

Selamselae, also known as Selemselitanus and Selamselae, is a suppressed titular see of the Roman Catholic Church. It is under the jurisdiction of Archdiocese of Carthage and was active through the Vandal and Roman Empires. A Bishop Felix, is known from late antiquity, and the current bishop is Gustavo Rodolfo Mendoza Hernández of Guatemala. The original seat of the ancient diocese was an oppidum (native town) in the Roman province of Africa Proconsularis, called Selem, though nothing is known of the town, not even its location.
