= Gustavo Rodolfo Mendoza Hernández =

Guatemalan clergyman

Gustavo Rodolfo Mendoza Hernández (born 19 October 1934 in Guatemala City) is a Guatemalan clergyman and emeritus Roman Catholic auxiliary bishop in Guatemala. Pope John Paul II appointed him on July 9, 2004 as auxiliary bishop of the archbishopric of Guatemala and titular bishop of Selemselae. On 11 November 2016, he resigned, citing his age.
