= Erika Aifán =

Guatemalan judge

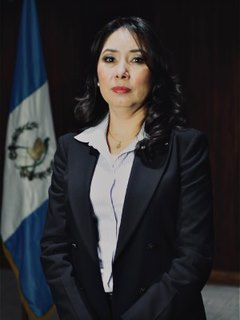
- Born: Erika Lorena Aifán c. 1975
- Education: Universidad de San Carlos de Guatemala
- Occupation: judge
- Known for: attacks on corruption

Erika Lorena Aifán (born 1975) is a former Guatemalan judge. On International Women's Day in 2021, she was recognised as a International Women of Courage by the US Secretary of State.

== Career ==
Aifán works with a very small staff of three and only one of those is permanent. In about 2016, she became a "high risk D" judge. During her time as a judge over 75 complaints were filed against her.

She dealt with nine businesspeople who were involved with giving bribes to disgraced minister Alejandro Sinibaldi Aparicio. She ordered that they pay compensation and that they gave public apologies.

She was one of three judges, together with Gloria Patricia Porras and Yassmín Barrios Aguilar, who have received support from the Inter-American Court of Human Rights. That court has ordered that these three should be given special protection. While she was dealing with the case against the politician Gustavo Alejos she received reports that two of her staff had been tampering with evidence.

She backed her staff and when the case went to the Supreme court then her staff were not punished but promoted. Aifán has won disputes like this but she has had to hire lawyers at her own expense to counter the dubious charges.

On March 21, 2022, Aifán resigned her position and fled the country for fear that corrupt government officials were about to have her arrested.

== Awards and recognitions ==
On International Women's Day in 2021, she received the International Women of Courage Award from the US Secretary of State. The ceremony was held virtually due to the ongoing COVID-19 pandemic and included an address by First Lady Jill Biden. Following the ceremony, the 14 awardees were eligible to participate in a virtual exchange as part of the International Visitor Leadership Program.

Unusually, another seven women who had been killed in Afghanistan were also included among the recipients of the award. Aifán's citation particularly noted her efforts to combat corruption and improve transparency and the independence of the Guatemala's justice system.

In 2022, she was one of three recipients of the first International Association of Judges' Judicial Independence Award.
