= Iris Yassmin Barrios Aguilar =

Guatemalan judge

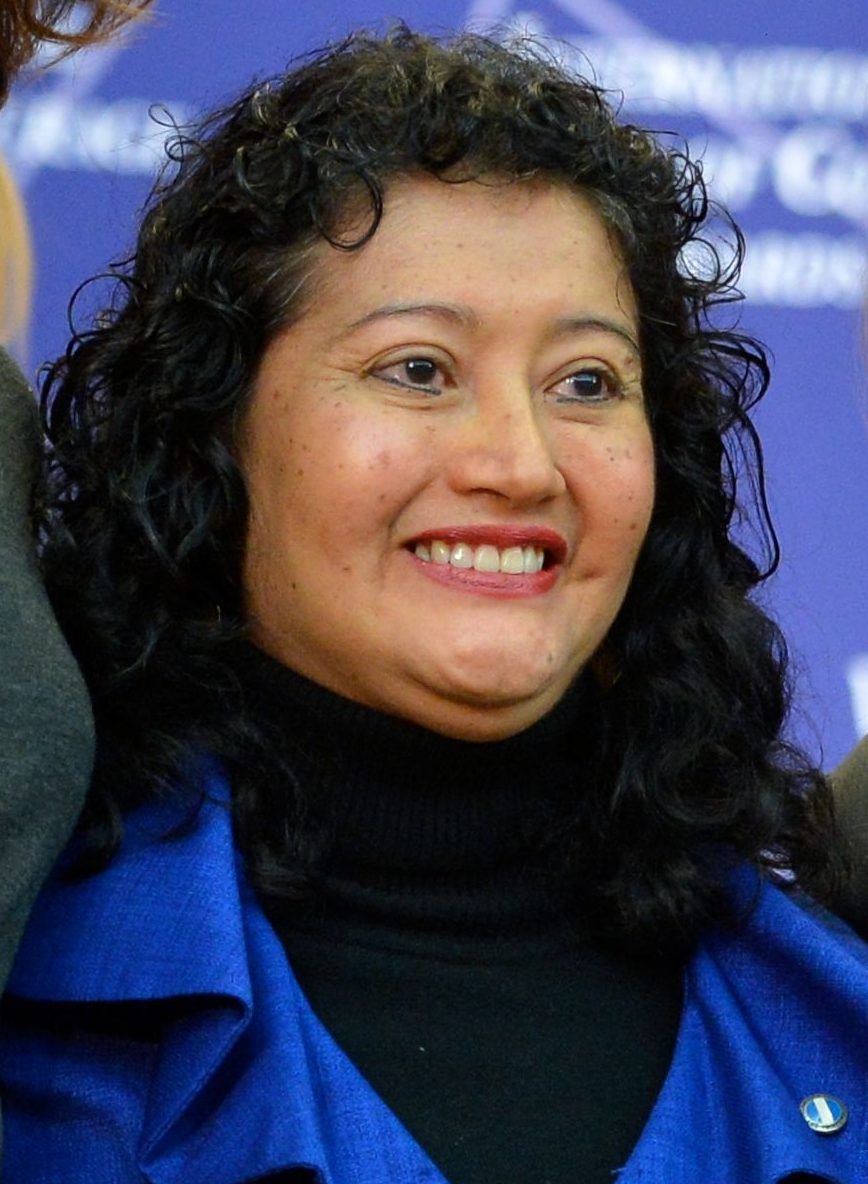
Barrios Aguilar in 2014

Iris Yassmin Barrios Aguilar is a judge and the president of one of Guatemala's two High Risk Court Tribunals. She was the presiding judge in the case of Efraín Ríos Montt, a former dictator of Guatemala.

== Career ==
In the trial against Montt, he was found guilty of the genocide of indigenous Ixil Mayans; the verdict came in 2013. The trial was the first time a national judiciary tried a former head of state for genocide in his home country. However, on May 20, 2013, the Constitutional Court of Guatemala overturned the conviction, voiding all proceedings back to April 19 and ordering that the trial be "reset" to that point, pending a dispute over the recusal of judges. Officials have said that Ríos Montt's trial will resume in January 2015.

Barrios received a 2014 International Women of Courage award.

As of April 2014 her judicial authority was suspended for a year due to a complaint against her by a lawyer who was involved in the trial of the President and war criminal Efraín Ríos Montt.

She was one of three judges, together with Gloria Porras and Erika Aifan, who have received support from the Inter-American Court on Human Rights. That court has ordered that these three should be given special protection. Aifan would also receive an International Women of Courage award in 2021.
