= Martus =

Martus is a surname. Notable people with the surname include:

- Florence Martus (1868–1943), American woman known for greeting ships arriving to Port of Savannah, Georgia between 1887 and 1931
- Jasper Martus, American politician from Michigan
- Steffen Martus (born 1968), German literary scholar

== See also ==
- Benetech
