= As Figueiras =

- Parish
- Location within Spain
- Coordinates: 43.533333°N 7.016667°W
- Country: Spain
- Autonomous community: Asturias
- Province: Asturias
- Municipality: Castropol

As Figueiras is one of nine parishes (administrative divisions) in the Castropol municipality, within the province and autonomous community of Asturias, in northern Spain.

The population is 714 (INE 2006).
