= György Snell =

Hungarian bishop (1949–2021)

- Bishop; Auxiliary Bishop of Esztergom-Budapest
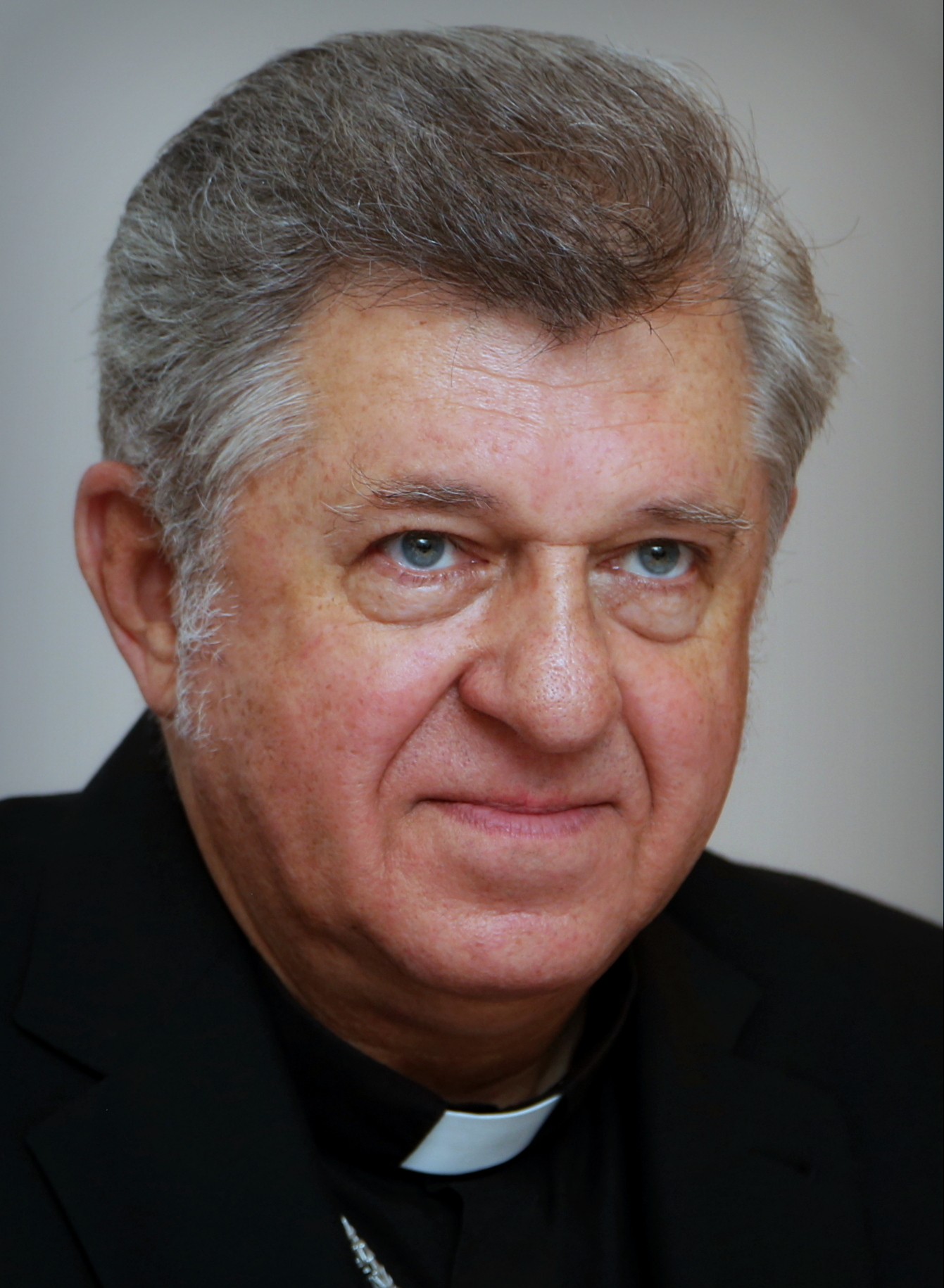
- György Snell in 2014
- Province: Esztergom-Budapest
- See: Esztergom-Budapest
- Appointed: 6 December 2014
- Term ended: 26 February 2021

Orders
- Ordination: 3 April 1972

Personal details
- Born: György Snell; 8 March 1949 Kiskirályság, Hungary
- Died: 26 February 2021 (aged 71) Budapest, Hungary
- Denomination: Catholic Church
- Coat of arms

György Snell (8 March 1949 – 26 February 2021) was a Hungarian Roman Catholic auxiliary bishop.

== Biography ==
Snell was born in Hungary and was ordained to the priesthood in 1972. He served as auxiliary bishop of Pudentiana and as auxiliary bishop of the Roman Catholic Archdiocese of Esztergom-Budapest from 2014 until his death in 2021 from COVID-19 during the COVID-19 pandemic in Hungary.
