= Myrna Mack =

Guatemalan anthropologist

- Born: Myrna Mack Chang; 24 October 1949; Retalhuleu, Guatemala
- Died: 11 September 1990 (aged 40); Guatemala City, Guatemala
- Cause of death: Assassination (stab wounds)
- Education: University of Manchester
- Occupations: Anthropologist; human rights activist
- Children: Lucrecia Hernández Mack

Myrna Mack Chang (24 October 1949 – 11 September 1990) was a Guatemalan anthropologist. In 1990, she was stabbed to death by elements in the Guatemalan military due to her criticism of the Guatemala government's treatment of the indigenous Maya, and human rights abuses against the people in general.

Due to her sister's pursuit of justice, Mack's killer was convicted and upper-level superiors tried in precedent-setting cases before the Inter-American Court of Human Rights in Costa Rica. In 2004 the government of Guatemala acknowledged its responsibility and paid her family financial compensation.

== Biography ==
Myrna Mack Chang was born in Barrio San Nicolás, Retalhuleu Department, in southwest Guatemala. Her mother was Chinese and her father was Mayan. Myrna had a younger sister, Helen. After attending local schools, the elder Mack went abroad for college. She studied anthropology in the United Kingdom, at both the University of Manchester and Durham University.

Upon returning to Guatemala, Mack conducted fieldwork among several of the many Maya campesino communities who were uprooted during the Civil War. She became sympathetic to their cause and became more of a human rights activist. As she was working closely with the indigenous peoples, she learned about the attacks made against them by government forces.

== Death ==
On 11 September 1990, Mack was assassinated outside her office in Guatemala City. She was stabbed 27 times by an armed forces death squad (allegedly trained at the School of the Americas) because she had criticized the government for its human rights abuses of the indigenous communities. She was 40 years old.

Her sister, mother and associates took up her case, determined to win justice for her death. Following the Peace Accords and end of the overt civil war, Guatemala was beginning to take actions to document abuses during the civil war, with testimony collected by the National Commission. Her sister Helen Mack filed a case with the Inter-American Human Rights Commission in Washington, DC and later with the Inter-American Court of Human Rights in Costa Rica. In 1993 she set up the Fundación Myrna Mack to support the prosecution and to do other work for human rights.

On 25 November 2003, the court ruled that Mack had been killed by government forces. In April 2004, following the judgment issued by the Inter-American Court of Human Rights, the Guatemalan government publicly acknowledged that its agents had committed the killing of Myrna Mack. It provided her next-of-kin with a financial compensation package as part of the court settlement.

Her sister, Helen, was honored with a Right Livelihood Award in 1992 "for her personal courage and persistence in seeking justice and an end to the impunity of political murderers." She continues to work for human rights and has received other recognition for it.

== Legacy and awards ==
In 1993, her sister Helen Mack Chang established the Fundación Myrna Mack to honor her memory, pursue justice through the courts for Mack's death, and continue work in defending human rights.

== Bibliography ==
- Mack Chang, Myrna Elizabeth (2011). "Assistance and Control". The Guatemala Reader. History, Culture, Politics. Duke University Press. pp. 421–426. doi:10.1215/9780822394679-081. ISBN 978-0-8223-5094-1. JSTOR j.ctv1198vws.86.
- Mack Chang, Myrna Elizabeth (1995). Organización y movilización: la propuesta nicaragüense de los '80 para Centroamérica (in Spanish). Guatemala: Asociación para el Avance de las Ciencias Sociales en Guatemala. OCLC 760509148.
- Mack Chang, Myrna Elizabeth (1992). ¿Donde está el futuro?: procesos de reintegración en comunidades de retornados (PDF) (in Spanish). Guatemala: Asociación para el Avance de las Ciencias Sociales en Guatemala. OCLC 760555169.
- Mack Chang, Myrna Elizabeth (1990). Politica institucional hacia el desplazado interno en Guatemala (PDF) (in Spanish). Guatemala: Asociación para el Avance de las Ciencias Sociales en Guatemala. OCLC 760631238.

== See also ==
- Helen Mack Chang
- Lucrecia Hernández Mack
