= Diocese of Santa Rosa de Lima =

Roman Catholic diocese in Guatemala

Diocese of Santa Rosa de Lima Dioecesis Sanctae Rosae de Lima

Location
- Country: Guatemala
- Ecclesiastical province: Province of Guatemala City

Statistics
- Area: 2,955 km^{2} (1,141 sq mi)
- Population: Total; Catholics: (as of 2010); 434,000; 359,000 (82.7%)
- Parishes: 16

Information
- Denomination: Roman Catholic
- Rite: Latin Rite
- Established: 27 April 1996 (29 years ago)
- Cathedral: Catedral del Niño Dios de Cuilapa

Current leadership
- Pope: Leo XIV
- Bishop: José Cayetano Parra Novo, O.P.

Map
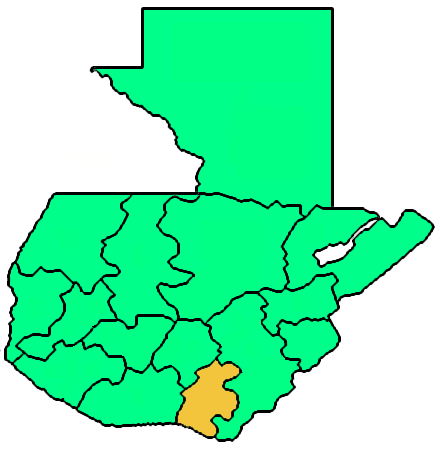

The Roman Catholic Diocese of Santa Rosa de Lima (erected 27 April 1996) is a suffragan diocese of the Archdiocese of Guatemala.

== Ordinaries ==
- Julio Amílcar Bethancourt Fioravanti (1996–2006)
- Bernabé de Jesús Sagastume Lemus, O.F.M. Cap. (2007–2021)
- José Cayetano Parra Novo, O.P. (2021–present)

== External links and references ==
- "Diocese of Santa Rosa de Lima". Catholic-Hierarchy.
