= Diocese of Escuintla =

Roman Catholic diocese in Guatemala

Coordinates: 14.3012°N 90.7856°W

Diocese of Escuintla Dioecesis Escuintlensis

Location
- Country: Guatemala
- Ecclesiastical province: Province of Guatemala City

Statistics
- Area: 4,384 km^{2} (1,693 sq mi)
- Population: Total; Catholics: (as of 2010); 1,149,000; 887,000 (77.2%)
- Parishes: 17

Information
- Denomination: Catholic Church
- Sui iuris church: Latin Church
- Rite: Roman Rite
- Established: 28 July 1994 (31 years ago)
- Cathedral: Catedral Nuestra Señora de Concepción

Current leadership
- Pope: Leo XIV
- Bishop: Victor Hugo Palma Paúl

Map
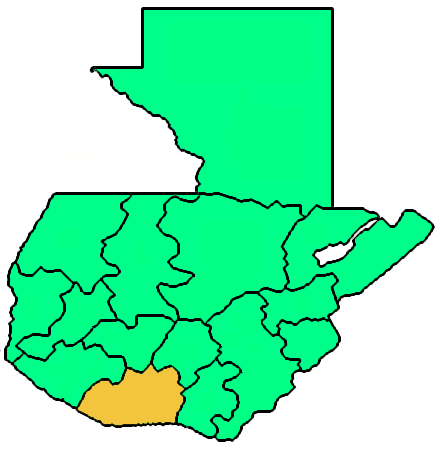

The Diocese of Escuintla is a Latin Church ecclesiastical territory or diocese of the Catholic Church in Guatemala. It is a suffragan diocese in the ecclesiastical province of the metropolitan Archdiocese of Guatemala. The Diocese of Escuintla was erected on 28 July 1994 from a territorial prelature.

Its cathedral is Catedral Nuestra Señora de Concepción, in the episcopal see of Escuintla.

== History ==
It was established on 1969.05.09 as a Territorial Prelature of Escuintla on territory split off from the Archdiocese of Guatemala, which remains its metropolitan. On 28 July 1994 it was promoted to diocese.

== Bishops ==
=== Episcopal ordinaries ===
Territorial Prelates of Escuintla

- José Julio Aguilar García (1969.05.09 – 1972.11.02), Titular Bishop of Bononia (1970.12.05 – 1972.11.02), later Bishop of Santa Cruz de la Sierra (Bolivia) (1972.11.02 – 1974.08.22)
- Mario Enrique Ríos Montt, Lazarists (C.M.) (1974.07.13 – 1984.03.03), Titular Bishop of Tiguala (1974.07.13 – ...); later Auxiliary Bishop of Guatemala (Guatemala) (1987.01.24 – 2010.10.02) and Apostolic Administrator of Izabal (Guatemala) (2011.07.26 – 2013.02.09)
- Fernando Claudio Gamalero González (1986.03.13 – 1994.07.28 see below)

Suffragan Bishops of Escuintla

- Fernando Claudio Gamalero González ( see above 1994.07.28 – death 2004.04.03)
- Victor Hugo Palma Paúl (2004.04.03 – ), succeeded as previous Coadjutor Bishop of Escuintla (2001.07.14 – 2004.04.03)

=== Coadjutor bishop ===
- Victor Hugo Palma Paúl (2001–2004)

== Sources, External links and references ==
- with incumbent biography links
- "Diocese of Escuintla". Catholic-Hierarchy.
