= Archdiocese of Santiago de Guatemala =

Roman Catholic archdiocese in Guatemala

Coordinates: 14.6416°N 90.5123°W

Archdiocese of Santiago de Guatemala Archidioecesis Sancti Iacobi in Guatemala Arquidiócesis de Santiago de Guatemala
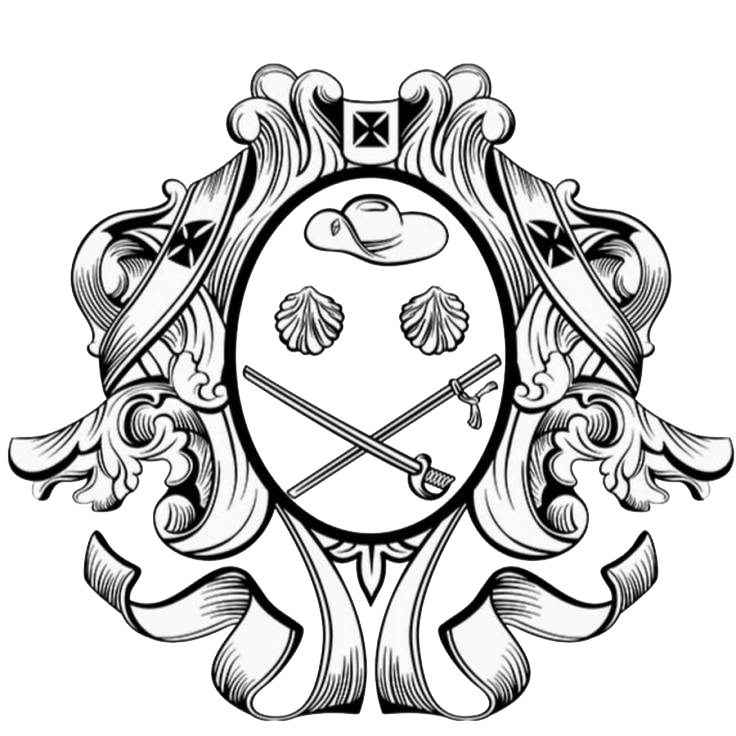

Location
- Country: Guatemala
- Ecclesiastical province: Province of Santiago de Guatemala
- Population: 3,486,000 (80%)

Information
- Denomination: Catholic Church
- Sui iuris church: Latin Church
- Rite: Roman Rite
- Established: December 18, 1534
- Cathedral: Primatial Metropolitan Cathedral of St. James
- Patron saint: Assumption of Mary, Saint James the Greater

Current leadership
- Pope: Leo XIV
- Archbishop: Gonzalo de Villa y Vásquez, S.J.
- Auxiliary Bishops: Gustavo Rodolfo Mendoza Hernández; Raúl Antonio Martinez Paredes; José Cayetano Parra Novo

The Archdiocese of Santiago de Guatemala is a Latin Church ecclesiastical territory or archdiocese of the Catholic Church in Guatemala. It is a primatial metropolitan see with six suffragan dioceses in its ecclesiastical province.

== Special churches ==
Its cathedral is the Catedral Primada Metropolitana de Santiago, is the episcopal see in the national capital Ciudad de Guatemala.

It also has

- the former Cathedral, a World Heritage Site: Catedral de San José, Antigua Guatemala, Sacatepéquez
- a Minor Basilica, National Shrine: Basílica de Nuestra Señora del Rosario, Ciudad de Guatemala, Guatemala
- other National Shrine: Iglesia de San Francisco el Grande, Antigua Guatemala, Sacatepéquez
- further Shrines: Santuario Arquidiocesano del Señor San José, Ciudad de Guatemala, Guatemala and Santuario Expiatorio al Sagrado Corazón de Jesús, Ciudad de Guatemala, Guatemala

== History ==
- It was erected 18 December 1534, as the Diocese of Guatemala, on territory split off from the then Diocese of Santo Domingo.
- On 21 June 1561 territory was ceded to establish the Diocese of Vera Paz
- It was elevated to Metropolitan Archdiocese of Guatemala on 16 December 1743.
- It lost territory repeatedly: on 28 September 1842, to establish the then Diocese of San Salvador, on 27 July 1921, to establish the then Roman Catholic Diocese of Quetzaltenango, Los Altos (now also a metropolitan archdiocese) and the then Apostolic Vicariate of Verapaz and Petén, on 10 March 1951, to establish the dioceses of Jalapa (its suffragan), Sololá and the Zacapa, on 9 May 1969, to establish the Territorial Prelature of Escuintla, and on 27 April 1996, to establish its suffragan Diocese of Santa Rosa de Lima.
- Papal visits were undertaken by Pope John Paul II in March 1983, February 1996 and July 2002.
- The Archdiocese was renamed as the Metropolitan Archdiocese of Santiago de Guatemala on 23 April 2013.

== Province ==
Its ecclesiastical province comprises the Metropolitan's own Archbishopric and the following suffragan bishoprics :

- Roman Catholic Diocese of Escuintla
- Roman Catholic Diocese of Jalapa
- Roman Catholic Diocese of San Francisco de Asís de Jutiapa
- Roman Catholic Diocese of Santa Rosa de Lima
- Roman Catholic Diocese of Verapaz, Cobán
- Roman Catholic Diocese of Zacapa y Santo Cristo de Esquipulas.

== Episcopal ordinaries ==
Bishops of Guatemala

- Francisco Marroquin Hurtado (1523–1563)
- Bernardino de Villalpando, C.R.S.A. (1564–1569)
- Pedro Gómez de Córdoba, O.S.H. (1574–1598)
- Juan Ramírez de Arellano, O.P. (1600–1609)
- Juan de las Cabezas Altamirano (1610–1615)
- Pedro de Valencia (1615–1617) appointed Bishop of La Paz
- Juan de Zapata y Sandoval, O.S.A. (1621–1630)
- Agustín de Ugarte y Sarabia (1630–1641)
- Bartolomé González Soltero (1641–1650)
- Juan Garcilaso de la Vega (1652–1657)
- Payo Enríquez de Rivera Manrique, O.S.A. (1657–1668)
- Juan de Sancto Mathía Sáenz de Mañozca y Murillo (1668–1675)
- Juan de Ortega Cano Montañez y Patiño (1675–1682)
- Andrés de las Navas y Quevedo, O. de M. (1682–1702)
- Mauro de Larreátegui y Colón, O.S.B. (1703–1711)
- Juan Bautista Álvarez de Toledo, O.F.M. (1713–1723)
- Nicolás Carlos Gómez de Cervantes y Velázquez de la Cadena (1723–1726)
- Juan Leandro Gómez de Parada Valdez y Mendoza (1728–1735)
- Pedro Pardo de Figueroa, O.M. (1735–1743 see below)

Archbishops of Guatemala

- Pedro Pardo de Figueroa, O.M. (see above 1743–1751)
- Francisco José de Figueredo y Victoria (1752–1765)
- Pedro Cortés y Larraz (1766–1779)
- Cayetano Francos y Monroy (1778–1792)
- Juan Félix de Villegas (1793–1800)
- Luis Ignatius Peñalver y Cárdenas (1801–1805)
- Rafael de La Vara (1806–1809)
- Francisco Ramón Valentín de Casaus y Torres, O.P. (1815–1845)
- Francisco de Paul García Peláez (1845–1867)
- José Bernardo Piñol y Aycinena (1867–1881)
- Ricardo Casanova y Estrada (1886–1913)
- Julio Ramón Riveiro y Jacinto, O.P. (1914–1921)
- Luis Javier Muñoz y Capurón, S.J. (1921–1927)
- Luis Durou y Sure, C.M. (1928–1938)
- Mariano Rossell y Arellano (1939–1964)
- Mario Casariego y Acevedo, C.R.S. (1964–1983); elevated to Cardinal in 1969
- Próspero Penados del Barrio (1983–2001)
- Rodolfo Quezada Toruño (2001–2010); elevated to Cardinal in 2003
- Óscar Julio Vian Morales, S.D.B. (2010 – April 25, 2013 see below)

Archbishops of Santiago de Guatemala

- Óscar Julio Vian Morales, S.D.B. (see above April 25, 2013 – February 24, 2018)
- Gonzalo de Villa y Vásquez, S.J. (July 9, 2020 – present)

=== Coadjutor bishops ===
- Fernando Ortiz de Hinojosa (1598); did not take effect
- Francisco de Paul García Peláez (1843–1845)
- Mario Casariego y Acevedo, C.R.S. (1963–1964); future Cardinal

=== Auxiliary bishops ===
- Miguel Cilieza y Velasco (1765–1767), appointed Bishop of Chiapas (Ciudad Real de Chiapas)
- Antonio Larrazábal (1839–1846), never consecrated
- Juan Félix de Jesús Zepeda, O.F.M. Obs. (1859–1861), appointed Bishop of Comayagua, Honduras
- Juan José de Aycinena y Piñol (1859–1865)
- osé María Barrutia y Croquer (1859–1864)
- Emmanuele Francesco Barrutia y Croquer (1865–1879)
- Miguel Angel García y Aráuz (1944–1951), appointed Bishop of Jalapa
- Rafael González Estrada (1955–1984)
- Mario Casariego y Acevedo, C.R.S. (1958–1963), appointed Coadjutor here; future Cardinal
- José Ramiro Pellecer Samayoa (1967–2010)
- James Richard Ham, M.M. (1967–1979)
- Luis Mario Martínez de Lejarza Valle, S.J. (1968–1980)
- Eduardo Ernesto Fuentes Duarte (1980–1982), appointed Coadjutor Bishop of Sololá
- Julio Amílcar Bethancourt Fioravanti (1982–1984), appointed Bishop of San Marcos
- Juan José Gerardi Conedera (1984–1998)
- Mario Enrique Ríos Montt, C.M. (1987–2010)
- Gonzalo de Villa y Vásquez, S.J. (2004–2007), appointed Bishop of Sololá-Chimaltenango
- Gustavo Rodolfo Mendoza Hernández (2004–2016)
- Raúl Antonio Martinez Paredes (2007–)
- José Cayetano Parra Novo, O.P. (2016–)

=== Other priests of this diocese who became bishops ===
- Jorge de Viteri y Ungo, appointed Bishop of San Salvador in 1843
- José Cándido Piñol y Batres, appointed Bishop of Granada, Nicaragua in 1913
- Jorge García Caballeros, appointed Bishop of Quetzaltenango, Los Altos in 1928
- Pablo Vizcaíno Prado, appointed Bishop of Suchitepéquez-Retalhuleu in 1996
- Victor Hugo Palma Paúl, appointed Coadjutor Bishop of Escuintla in 2001
- Álvaro Leonel Ramazzini Imeri, appointed Bishop of San Marcos in 2008; elevated as Cardinal in 2019
- Carlos Enrique Trinidad Gómez, appointed Bishop of San Marcos in 2014

== Churches ==
- Iglesia Católica Sagrado Corazón de Jesus, Guatemala City
- Iglesia de Cristo Pinares del Nort
