= Black Jesus =

Black Jesus may refer to:

== Catholicism ==
- Black Nazarene
- Cristos Negros of Central America and Mexico
  - Black Christ of Esquipulas
  - Cristo Negro (Portobelo)

== Media ==
- "Black Jesus", a season-one episode of the TV series Black Lightning
- Black Jesus (film), a 1968 Italian drama film
- Black Jesus (TV series), an American sitcom created by Aaron McGruder and Mike Clattenburg

=== Songs ===
- "Black Jesus" (song), a song by American artist Everlast
- "Black Jesus", a song by Lil Yachty on the 2020 album Lil Boat 3
- "Black Jesus + Amen Fashion", a bonus track on the 2011 Lady Gaga album Born This Way
- "Black Jesuz", a song by 2Pac + Outlawz on the 1999 album Still I Rise

== People ==
- Earl Monroe (born 1944; also "Black Jesus"), American retired professional basketball player
- Perrance Shiri (1955–2020; also "Black Jesus"), retired Zimbabwean air officer
- Steven Tari (1971–2013; also "Black Jesus"), Papua New Guinean religious figure
- Black Jesus, a character from the 1975 film Coonskin

== See also ==
- Black Jesus Voice, a solo album by Richard H. Kirk
- Race and appearance of Jesus
