= Black Christ statue =

Black Christ statue is the name or description of several black or blackened wooden sculptures of Jesus Christ, such as:

- Black Nazarene of Quiapo, Manila, Philippines
- Cristo Negro (Portobelo), celebrated in the town of Portobelo in the Colón Province of Panama with a festival on October 21.
- Black Christ of Esquipulas
- Temple of Santa María Ahuacatlán, Valle de Bravo, Mexico
- Cristos Negros of Central America and Mexico
- Christ of Succour, a now destroyed statue that was the inspiration for the Succoro brotherhood in Cartagena, Spain
- Santo Cristo Del Milagroso De Sinait (Apo Lakay) a moniker version of the Black Nazarene enshrined in Sinait Basilica

== See also ==
- Black Christ (disambiguation)
