= Esquipulas =

- Municipality and town
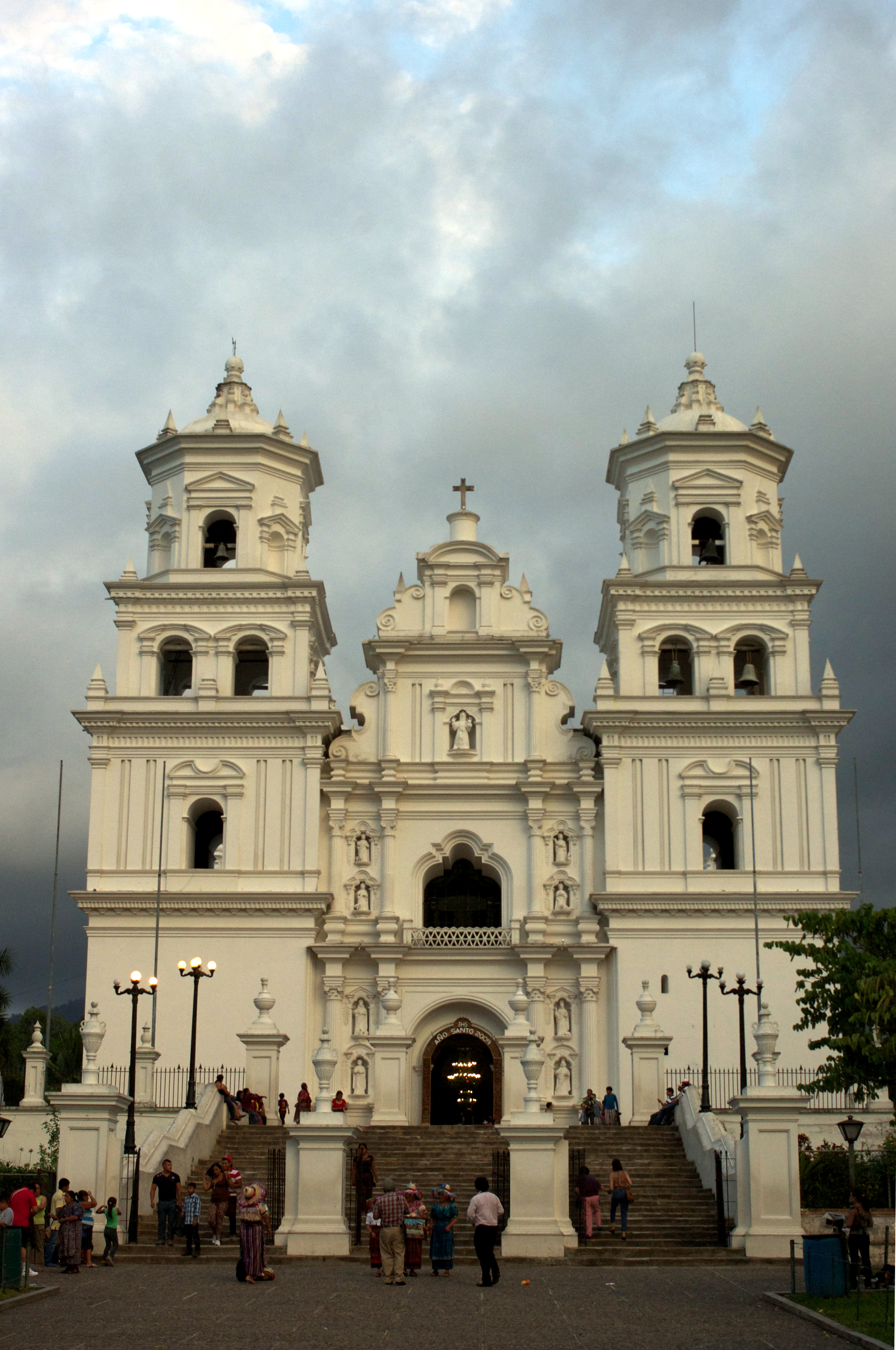
- Basilica of Esquipulas

- Location in Guatemala
- Coordinates: 14°34′N 89°21′W
- Country: Guatemala
- Department: Chiquimula Department

Area
  - Total: 191 sq mi (495 km^{2})

Population (2018 census)
  - Total: 53,556
  - Density: 280/sq mi (108/km^{2})
- Climate: Aw

Esquipulas (Nahuatl: Isquitzuchil, "place where flowers abound"), officially Municipality of Esquipulas, whose original name was Yzquipulas, is a town, with a population of 18,667 (2018 census), and a municipality located in the department of Chiquimula, in eastern Guatemala. Esquipulas' main attraction is the beautiful Black Christ located in the Basilica of Esquipulas, making the town an important place of Catholic pilgrimage for Central America. It is also one of the most important towns of the country and one that has had the most economic and cultural growth.

In 2002, it was registered on UNESCO's tentative World Heritage list.

The city is a tourist attraction due to its ecological and religious importance. It is the most visited city and town across eastern Guatemala and the second most visited in the country, surpassed only by the City of Guatemala, visited annually by approximately four to five million tourists and devout Catholics, this due to its important and varied religious resorts and distributed in the 495 km^{2}, the smallest city visited by Pope John Paul II in 1996 which entitled him recognition as Capital Central to the Faith, whose recognition is currently known as to this city, which was also visited by Teresa of Calcutta, hosted the Esquipulas Peace Accords during the mid-1980s. The Basilica of Esquipulas headquarters in Central Catholic Faith is the first wonder of Guatemala competition held by the Industrial Bank on November 26, 2008.

In 1987 the Trifinio Biosphere Reserve was created to protect the unique flora and fauna in the region.

The territory comprises an area of 495 km^{2}, distributed in 20 villages, 123 sub villages, one town and two villas which are Timushán and Chanmagua, with a total population of 53,556 (2018 census); with the town of Esquipulas having a population of 18,667 which represents 35% of the total population of the municipality. Esquipulas is located 222 kilometers from Guatemala City, 9.5 kilometers from the border with the Republic of Honduras and 45 kilometers from the city of Chiquimula, bordering the municipalities of Olopa, Jocotán and the department Camotán Chiquimula to the north and the municipality of Metapan, El Salvador to the south. To the east it meets the departments of Copán and Ocotepeque, Honduras and to the west, the municipality of Concepción Las Minas and the Resume Chiquimula department.

== History ==
=== Pre-Hispanic ===
The northern region and center of Esquipulas is located within the geographical area known as Region Ch'orti' people of Guatemala. Chorti culture and the Kingdom Payaki or Payaqui which was notable for leaving some of their old architectures developed within this municipality.

==== Culture Chorti ====
The first settlers were descendants from Maya people of Copán (archaeological site) Copán, Honduras who came to these lands, shortly after they were forming groups or ethnic groups including ethnic Ch'orti ', these moved Esquipulas after leaving or moving of its ancient cities, this culture achievement develop for several years, even after of the Spanish conquest these were gradually disappearing from the municipality and moved to other municipality such as Camotan, Chiquimula and Jocotan, although they reached the Valley of Esquipulas, this culture is developed more in the villages Timushan and Chanmagua.

==== Kingdom Payaqui ====
Another ethnic group who lived in this municipality was ethnically Payaqui. The priest Topiltzín Axcitl or Nacxit was the founder of the Kingdom of Payaqui. The origin of this town, is located in the depths of the mystery of the cultura maya (the name Isquitzuchil´ appears in the history from the earliest times in 1000 BC).

=== 16th Century ===
==== Spanish colonization ====
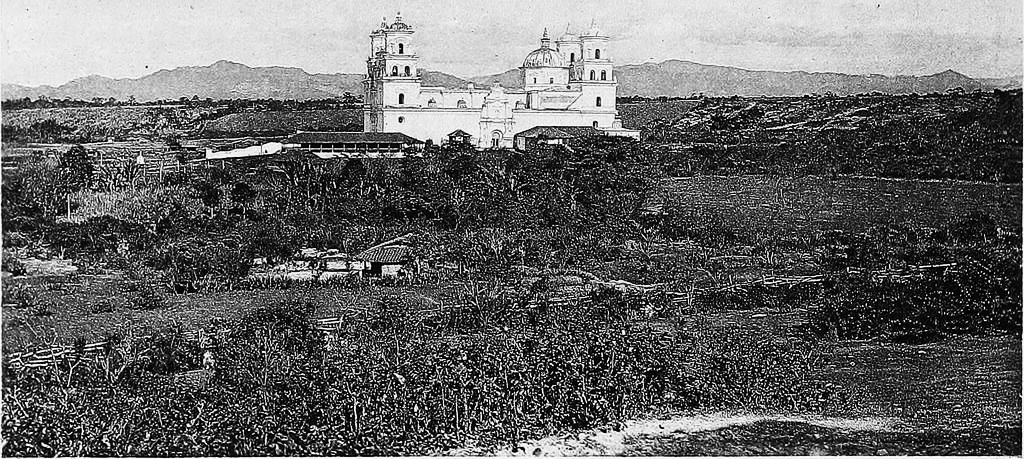
Esquipulas Basílica in 1895

In 1524 Spanish forces first established themselves in the area now known as Guatemala with the settling of the area's first municipality at Tecpan. By 1525 Spanish forces had reached the region South of the Valley of Monte Christo, this region then being inhabited by the Chorti Indians.

==== Conquest of Isquitzuchil ====
In 1525, the captains Juan Pérez Dardón, Sancho de Barahona and Bartolomé Becerra under the command of Pedro de Alvarado conquered the province of Chiquimula, and as a result the Catholic religion was imposed upon the conquered peoples. In April 1530 the locals led by chieftains Copantl and Galel again revolted against the conquerors and as a result, Don Francisco de Orduña ordered the captains Pedro de Amalina and Hernando de Chávez that they leave from Mitlan to "pacify" the region, who departed along with 60 Marines, 400 Allied Indians and 30 horses. The region was well defended and hindered the entry of the Spanish army. After fighting for 3 days, the inhabitants of the region finally surrendered, mostly for peace and public tranquility, and also for fear of the Castilian arms, in the words of the Chief.

==== Esquipulas ====
Between 1550 and 1560 the town of Yzquipulas (later Esquipulas) was founded in this region by Juan Pérez Dardón. Dardón brought with him slaves of Mayan-Chortí and Mayan-Payaquí origin from other regions of the province of Chiquimula de la Sierra. The main street in town was laid out, running from the main Iglesia de Santiago in the South, to the town's aqueduct in the North. The city plan eventually grew to include two city plazas, now known as "Parque de la Basilica," in the South and in the North, adjacent to the older parish church "Iglesia de Santiago,"is the "Parque Centroamerica" plaza.

In the early 1700s Esquipulas was one of the most populous Spanish communities in the area. According to the town's baptismal registry, it then had a population of 198 people. A century later, the records reflected that the community had reached 851 inhabitants, representing 30% of the total population of the department of Chiquimula. Apparently settlers were attracted to the region by the great fertility of its valleys.

=== Catholicism in Esquipulas ===
In 1594, the villagers asked the Portuguese sculptor Quirio Cataño to sculpt a crucified Christ with a dark complexion. The Portuguese sculptor, who resided in Santiago de los Caballeros de Guatemala, delivered the Black Christon October 4, 1594, as established in the initial contract. The image was collected by the inhabitants of Esquipulas and taken to their small town, arriving on March 9, 1595, and initially installed in a small shrine in a monastic hermitage just outside of the town. The inhabitants of that time called the sculpture "miraculous", which drew the attention of the surrounding Catholic populations. By 1650 the town was one of the most important Catholic sites of the captaincy general since it was visited by people from the provinces of El Salvador and Comayagua. In 1680, the construction of the Santiago Church began, which was completed in 1682, the year in which the sculpture of the Black Christ was moved from the hermitage.

In 1740 the fifteenth bishop of Guatemala, fray Pedro Pardo de Figueroa, in order to attend the ever-growing pilgrimages dedicated to the Christ of Esquipulas and in gratitude for the healing of a disease, commissioned the construction of a larger basilica to the architect Felipe José de Porres, son of Diego de Porres and grandson of José de Porres, renowned senior architects of the capital city of the Captaincy General of Guatemala, Santiago de los Caballeros.

Fray Pedro Pardo de Figueroa died on February 2, 1751, during a visit to Esquipulas to supervise the construction of the sanctuary and was buried in the basilica of Esquipulas, according to his last will. He was replaced by Francisco de Figueredo y Victoria, who continued the construction of the basilica, which was completed at the end of 1758. On November 4 of that year he decreed the solemn dedication of the new sanctuary, which was inaugurated on January 4, 1759. The image of the Christ of Esquipulas was transferred to the new basilica on Saturday January 6, 1759.

== Education ==
Municipality villages and hamlets Esquipulas is organized in 20 villages and 123 settlements
Village	Surface Square km	Hamlets
City of Esquipulas hamlets		There are four hamlets within the city and, even though they are not outside city limits, there are considerably far away from downtown: El Ciracil, El Sillón, Tizaquín and Vuelta Grande
Atulapa	37	Agua Caliente, Amatal, Agua Zarca, Bojorquez, Canoas, El Barrial, El Cerrón, Horno de Vides, La Brea, La Casona, Mesa Grande, Montesinas and Zompopero
Santa Rosalía	31	El Duraznal, El Jocotal, El Limón, La Cuestona, Las Toreras, El Portezuelo and Plan de La Arada
San Nicolás	32	El Barrial, El Cascajal, Chaguitón, Guayabito, Miramundo and Tecomapa
La Granadilla	40	El Chuctal, El Olvido, El Porvenir and Floripundio
Olopita	46	Cuevitas, El Bueyero, Las Crucitas, Olopita Centro, Piedra Redonda, San Cristóbal, San Juan and Tontoles
Valle Dolores	33	El Chaguite, El Chorro, Los Vados, San Juan Arriba and Tierra Colorada
Belén (El Tablón)	10	Agua Zarca, Chiramay, El Zapote and La Ruda
Cruz Alta	27	Curruche and Las Palmas
Jagua (Las Cañas)	37	El Empedrado, El Encino, El Jicaro, El Peñasco (Death plane), El Pinalito, El Salitre, La Cumbre, Las Sopas, Lagunas, Llano de Guerra, Ojo de Agua, Palmitas, Rincón de María, San Francisco Buena Vista and Tareas
Las Peñas	30	El Incienso, El Palmar, El Pesote, Joyas Verdes, La Fortuna, Miramundo and Queseras
El Zarzal	19	El Guineal, Malcotal, Potrerillos, Zapotal and Zapotalito
Valle de Jesús	6	Valle de Jesús
San Isidro	10	Capucal, El Chuctal, Entre Ríos and Malcotalito
Chanmagua	30	El Pedregal, Las Pozas, Los Varales and Laguna Seca
Cafetales	20	La Aradona, La Rinconada, Loma Alta and Llano Largo
El Carrizal	25	Bailadero, Joyitas, Llano de los Toros, Pericos and Tabloncito
Horcones	15	Calzontes, El Zarzalito, Piedra de Amolar, Tablón de Gámez and Tishac
Timushán	40	Cañada del Pino, El Mojón, El Bajío, Loma del Mango, Los Fierros, Llano de San Gaspar, Malcinca, Pasaljá, San Antonio Sulay, San Miguel Mapa, Suyate and Tablón de Sulay
Monteros	10	El Horno and El Rincón de León
Carboneras	10	El Rincón
Source: Villeda Maderos (2006)

52% (27.664 inh.) of the population is made up young people within 0 and 25 years of age, of which 64% (17.705) of that 52% (27.664) of young scholars. Education quality is high active Esquipulas, +89.0, the best quality education across the east. The Esquipulas educational calendar is 180 days, the dates may vary, the most common are from 18 January to 12 October (10 months) and a total of 90 days or 3 months off. 70% (12.393) study in private institutions that are several in Esquipulas, while only 30% (5.311) study in the public institutions of government.

Esquipulas has stood massively in youth participation in National Science Olympiad in Guatemala, which is in charge of the University of San Carlos de Guatemala, taking several gold medals, silver and bronze as well as awards for part of the young participants.

=== Esquipulan Winners in the ONC (USAC) ===
Esquipulan winners in the National Olympiad of Science (ONC) are various and Esquipulas has the largest share and the highest number of awards won. Participants go to various materials and are: mathematics, natural sciences, social sciences, chemistry, physics and biology major, degrees from 1° to 3° basic or secondary and diversified.

== Tourism ==
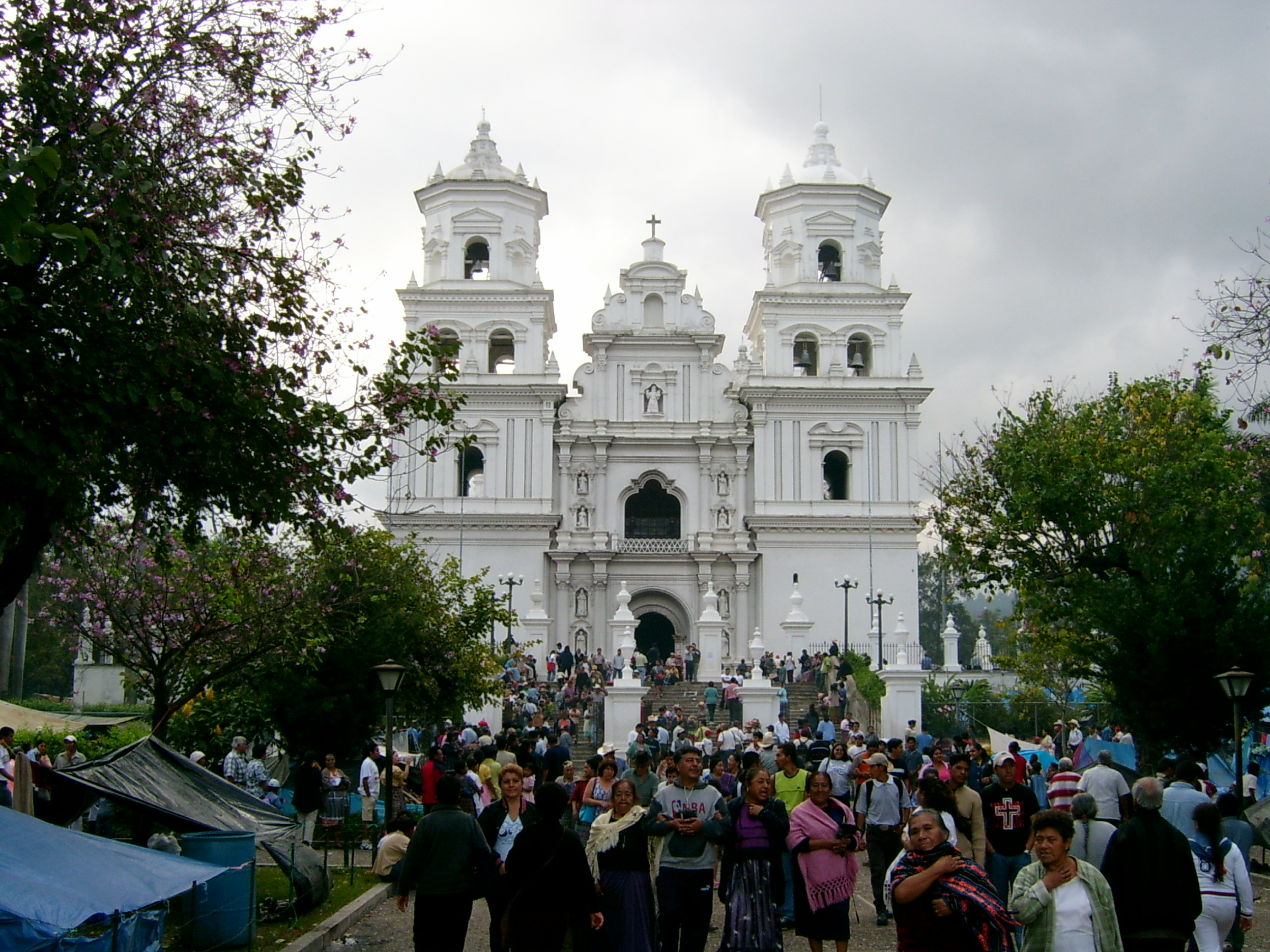
Esquipulas Basilica in 2010

Because of its importance as a tourist and religious center, the population of Esquipulas is dedicated mostly to that trade, although there is also a strong coffee industry which produces some of the best varieties available. Currently, religious tourism and hospitality industry has boomed, fueled by the large number of pilgrims visiting the sacred image of the Black Christ of Esquipulas.

Tourism in Esquipulas grew gradually, since the area is a very attractive destination due to its natural resources and its colonial history, along with its culture expressed in its customs and cuisine. There is a strong interest of visitors on religious colonial places like the Basilica of Esquipulas, which was built in 1740 under the sponsorship of Monsignor Pedro Pardo de Figueroa (first Metropolitan Archbishop of Guatemala appoint in 1744) in order to meet the increasingly growing pilgrimages dedicated to the Black Christ of Esquipulas. Pardo de Figueroa commissioned the construction of a temple to Philip José de Porres, the son of Diego de Porres and grandson of Joseph de Porres, renowned architects from the capital city Santiago de los Caballeros de Guatemala and the funding came from the cotton fields owners.

Interesting tourist destinations are:

- Basilica of Esquipulas
- "Los Compadres" stone
- Mine cave
- Trifinio Biosphere Reserve
- Chatún Park
- "El Guisayote" biosphere reserve
- Acueducto "Los Arcos"
- Río Atulapa

=== Basilica of Esquipulas ===
In 1956, Pope Pius XII erected the Prelature nullius for the Black Christ and established by the municipality of Esquipulas and the Santuario de Esquipulas Cathedral as its venue. The Archbishop of Guatemala, Monsignor Mariano Rossell y Arellano, was appointed the First Prelate of Esquipulas; one of the first concerns of Rossell y Arellano was to seek a religious order to take over the care of the sanctuary. Finally, he found support from the Benedictine Abbey of San José, located in Louisiana, USA. The order sent three monks in 1959 with the mission of founding the Benedictine Monastery of Esquipulas which is responsible for the care of the Basilica in the 21st century.

In 1961, Archbishop Rossell sent a request to Pope John XXIII, who, based in religious, cultural and historic shrine of Esquipulas raised to the rank of Minor Basilica. This Basilica is the only one that has been erected in Central America.

=== Stone of the Compadres ===
These two stones, one on top of the other in strange balance, have stood the test of time as well as historical earthquakes. They are not small at all: the upper stone is about the size of a regular sedan and together they reach a height of about three meters and a calculated weight of 50 tons. A legend in Esquipulas says that two friends became "compadres" (godfathers to the offspring of the other), but in spite of this sacred pact, one of them was carried away by desire and seduced the other's wife. They were turned into stone as punishment for their sins, left for all to see their forbidden desire for each other, among the whispering wind and swaying trees. On the other hand, traditional communities believe that the stones are a manifestation of divine powers, or materialization of divine will; therefore, the place is scene of sacred rituals, prayers, sacrifices and penances. The stones are blackened by the rituals performed there, often including a sacrificed, beheaded cock placed between candles.

=== Mine Cave ===
The oral tradition dictates that it was in this place where Christ reveals the image of the famous sculptor Quirio Black Catano, creator of the famous statue venerated in Esquipulas.

Are located south of the city right next to the Basilica and one kilometer away from the road leading to Honduras, there are some hills which one was drilled in a cross lying north to south in the more margins of the Rio Chacalapa or Miracles. It is said that many went through all these places in search of a mine that salvation was to finance the work of the Basilica, but finally, up and down and doing tests, the savior was found, began drilling and operating silver mine that was a fact, when they needed was more like a miracle those deluded savior.

These caves were like a memory of that silver mine, which by its geographical location near the Basilica, they found there has been attributed to the miraculous Christ of Esquipulas, which is not true because the documents were later found which consists reliable that the image was burilado by the architect in Antigua Guatemala Quirio Catano, however many indigenous pilgrims from the West, with a mixture of Christian faith and traditions or beliefs, come to visit these caves, performing their own rituals, burn pon and candles, even money left within them.

The caves are within private land whose owner have taken advantage of the touristic value that they have, given the influx of pilgrims and the river that runs through the place. They installed the "Cuevas de las Minas" Ecological Park, which has a zoo with more than 25 species, and several modern amenities.

=== Park Chatún ===
Chatun is an Adventure and Fun Park, where all features are intended to show the diversity of our natural resources and our customs and traditions, based on two pillars: adventure and nature.

== Agriculture ==
It also has advantages in agriculture, because its coffee, Sertamenes Esquipulas, has won several national and international as the best quality coffee and the richest of Guatemala. There are three farms, Finca Finca Cloud, and the Cascajal, that have won contests for "The Best Coffee in Guatemala and the World" according to the National Coffee Association.

== Religion ==
=== The Basilica ===
The cathedral at Esquipulas was proclaimed a basilica in 1961 by Pope John XXIII, and in 1995, celebrating the 400th anniversary of the shrine, Pope John Paul II proclaimed it "the spiritual center of Central America." Every year, thousands of pilgrims from Guatemala, the United States, Mexico, Europe and other Central American countries flock to pay homage to the dark wooden image of the crucified Christ, the most revered Catholic shrine in the region.

El Santuario de Chimayo, a major Roman Catholic pilgrimage site in Chimayó, New Mexico, United States, is closely linked with Esquipulas.

=== Tierra Santa tablets ===
Esquipulas is famous for its Tierra Santa (Holy Earth) clay tablets that are purchased by the pilgrims during church festivals. The clay from the local deposits is cleaned and pressed into small cakes. Such clay is also known as tierra bendita, or Tierra del Santo. The popularity of this clay is attested by the many names (for example, akipula, cipula, askipula, kipula) that are used for such medicinal clay tablets all around Central America. Pilgrims sometimes eat the supposedly curative clay, or they rub themselves with it.

Similar customs prevail at the sister shrine El Santuario de Chimayo in the US.

== Culture ==
=== Beauty contests ===
The maximum beauty event in Esquipulas is "Miss Beauty of Esquipulas", formerly "Señorita Esquipulas", followed by the National Queen of the Independence Festival. These events are the second most important beauty contests in the country after only "Miss Universe Guatemala".

== Climate ==
Climate data for Esquipulas
Month	Jan	Feb	Mar	Apr	May	Jun	Jul	Aug	Sep	Oct	Nov	Dec	Year
Mean daily maximum °C (°F)	27 (81)	29 (84)	30 (86)	33 (91)	31 (88)	30 (86)	29 (84)	28 (82)	29 (84)	26 (79)	28 (82)	28 (82)	28 (82)
Mean daily minimum °C (°F)	10 (50)	9 (48)	10 (50)	10 (50)	10 (50)	11 (52)	11 (52)	13 (55)	13 (55)	11 (52)	8 (46)	9 (48)	8 (46)
Average precipitation mm (inches)	2.0 (0.08)	1.1 (0.04)	11.7 (0.46)	50.9 (2.00)	141.9 (5.59)	211.8 (8.34)	415.1 (16.34)	278.3 (10.96)	220.2 (8.67)	654.9 (25.78)	32.0 (1.26)	2.9 (0.11)	1,533.4 (60.37)
Source: INSIVUMEH. "Estación de Meteorología de Esquipulas". INSIVUMEH (in Spanish). Guatemala. Archived from the original on 31 March 2014.

== See also ==
- Cristos Negros of Central America and Mexico

== Bibliography ==
- Villeda Maderos, José Romilio (2006). "Aldeas y sus caseríos". Esquipulas en línea. Esquipulas, Guatemala. Archived from the original on 4 March 2008.
