= El Santuario de Chimayo =

Historic church in New Mexico (built 1816)

- El Santuario de Chimayó
- U.S. National Register of Historic Places
- U.S. National Historic Landmark
- NM State Register of Cultural Properties
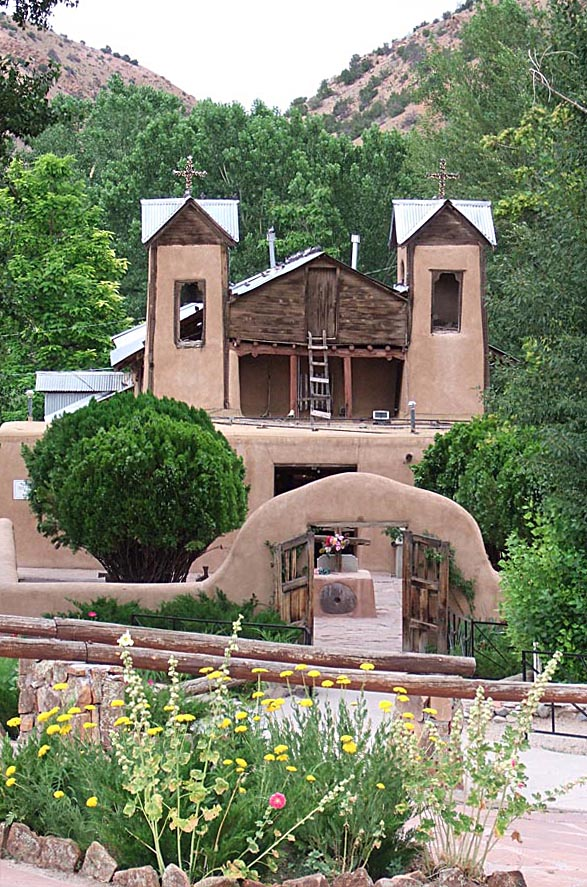

- Location within New Mexico Location within the United States
- Location: 1 mi. NW of Santa Cruz Reservoir Dam
- Nearest city: Chimayo, New Mexico
- Coordinates: 35°59′23″N 105°55′38″W
- Area: 6.4 acres (2.6 ha)
- Built: 1816
- NRHP reference No.: 70000412
- NMSRCP No.: 188

Significant dates
- Added to NRHP: April 15, 1970
- Designated NHL: April 15, 1970
- Designated NMSRCP: December 20, 1968

El Santuario de Chimayó is a Roman Catholic church in Chimayo, New Mexico, United States. (Santuario is Spanish for "sanctuary".) This shrine, a National Historic Landmark, is famous for the story of its founding and as a contemporary pilgrimage site. It receives almost 300,000 visitors per year and has been called "no doubt the most important Catholic pilgrimage center in the United States."

== Description ==
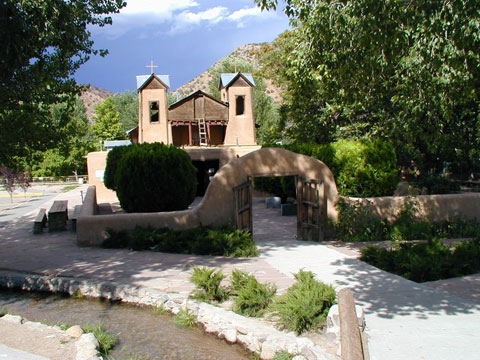
Front with Potrero Ditch (an acequia)

The Santuario is on Juan Medina Drive in Chimayo. It is entered through a walled courtyard. Built of adobe with a bell tower on each side, the church is 60 feet (18 m) long and 24 feet (7.3 m) wide with walls more than 3 feet (about 1 m) thick. Pointed caps on the towers and a metal pitched roof (blocking the clerestory) were added after 1917, probably in the 1920s. The "elegant" doors were carved by the 19th-century carpenter Pedro Domínguez. An unusual feature is two side-by-side rooms at the entrance forming a vestibule or narthex, once used for storage. The nave contains a crucifix representing Christ of Esquipulas, 6 feet (1.8 m) tall. Other notable folk-art decorations include five reredoses and a small sculpture of St. James the Great. A small room called el pocito (the little well) contains a round pit, the source of "holy dirt" (tierra bendita) that is believed to have healing powers. An adjacent prayer room displays many ex-votos as well as photographs, discarded crutches, and other testimonials of those purportedly healed.

== History ==
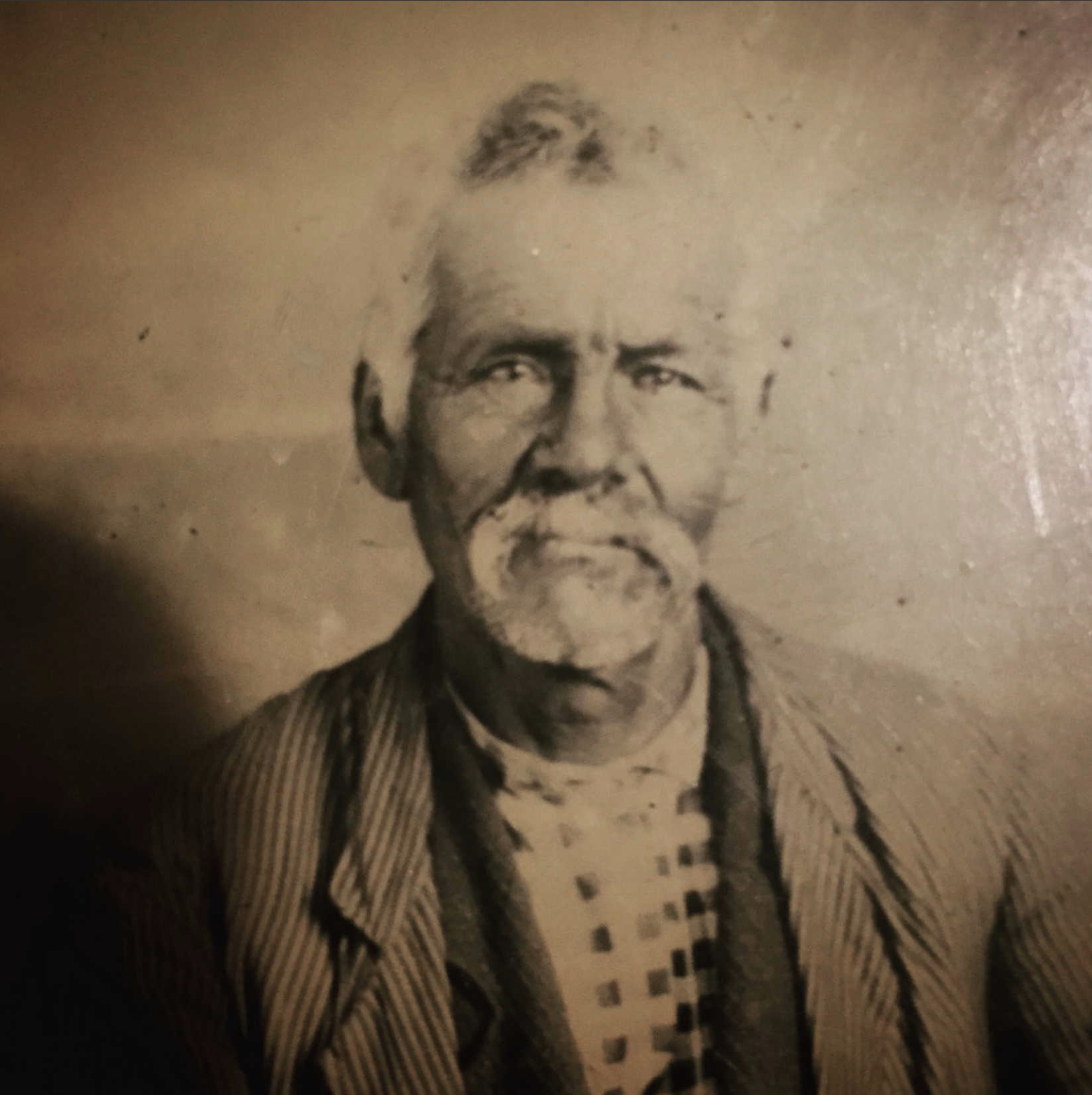
Bernardo de la Encarnacion Abeyta c.1850s, builder of the first chapel

In the early 19th century, 19 families lived in what was then called El Potrero de Chimayó (potrero means pasture). The land where the Santuario stands belonged to Don Bernardo Abeyta, one of the first members of Los Hermanos de la Fraternidad Piadosa de Nuestro Padre Jesús Nazareno (the Penitentes) in the area. He was probably devoted to the Christ of Esquipulas, a pilgrimage site in Guatemala where the clay is ascribed healing power. A nephew of Don Bernardo was christened Juan de Esquipulas in 1805.

Bernardo Abeyta built a small chapel to the Christ of Esquipulas on the site around 1810. On November 15, 1813, he wrote to Father Sebastián Álvarez, the parish priest of Santa Cruz de la Cañada, asking him to write to the Episcopal See of Durango for permission to build a bigger church in which the people of El Potrero could worship Jesus as he appeared at Esquipulas and could hear Mass. The next day, Fr. Álvarez wrote the letter, mentioning that cures were reported and many pilgrims were arriving. On February 8, 1814, Francisco Fernández Valentín, Vicar General of the Diocese of Durango, wrote back with permission. By 1816 the chapel was replaced by the El Santuario shrine.

Abeyta's daughter, Carmen Abeyta de Chaves, inherited the property and kept it despite an attempt to force her to give it to the Church; a major source of her income was donations from pilgrims. Her daughter, María de los Ángeles Chaves, inherited it in turn and was the owner as of 1915. In 1929, when the owners were in financial trouble, members of the newly formed Spanish Colonial Arts Society bought the property and donated it to the Archdiocese of Santa Fe.

El Santuario de Chimayó was declared a National Historic Landmark in 1970.

In 2011, Vietnamese Catholics erected a statue of Our Lady of La Vang behind the Santuario in honor of refugees. In recent years, many Vietnamese and Filipino Catholics have made pilgrimage to the sanctuary to honor the site, which is significant for those of Asian descent.

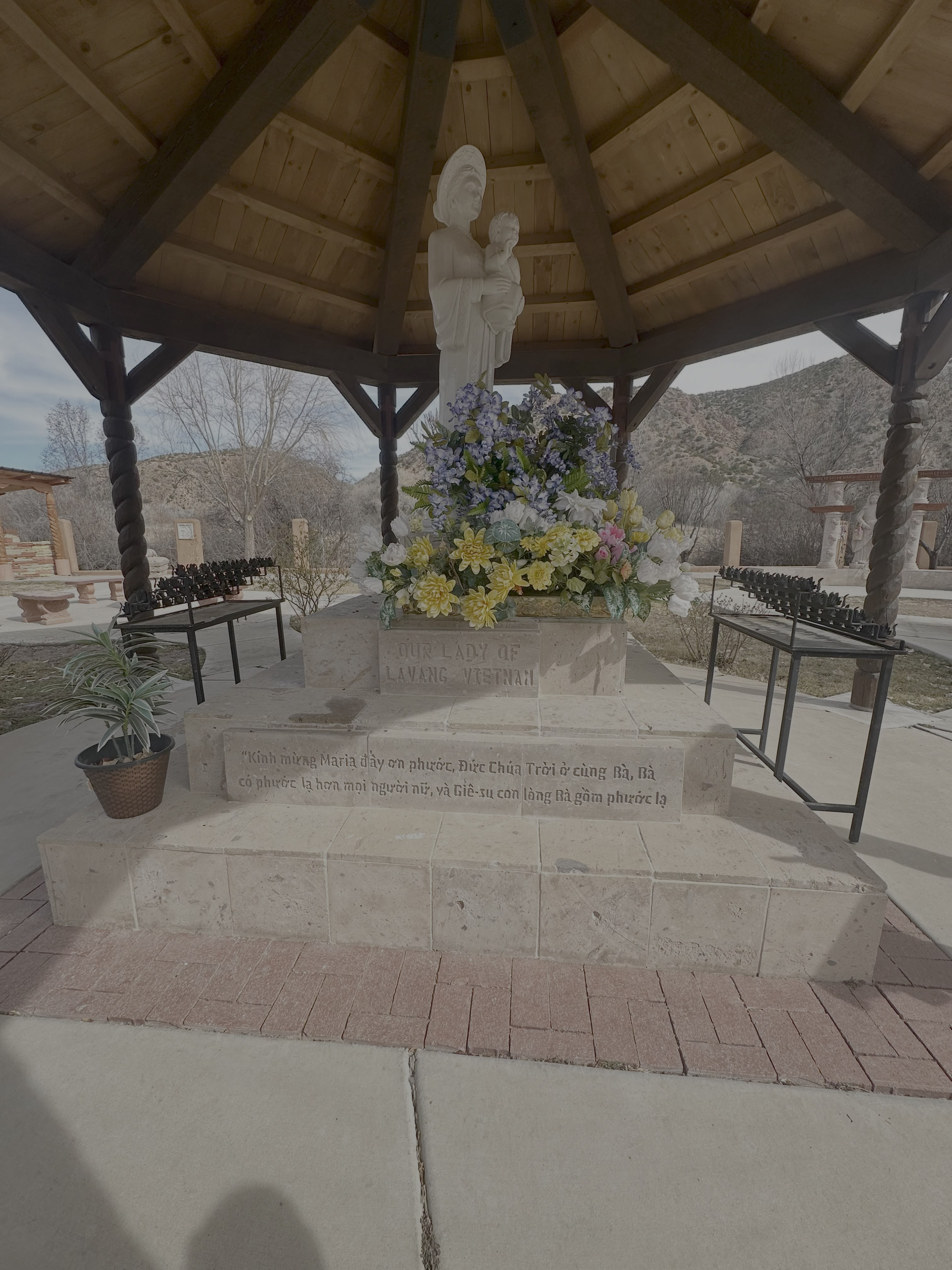
The statue of Our Lady of La Vang at El Santuario.

== Annual observances ==
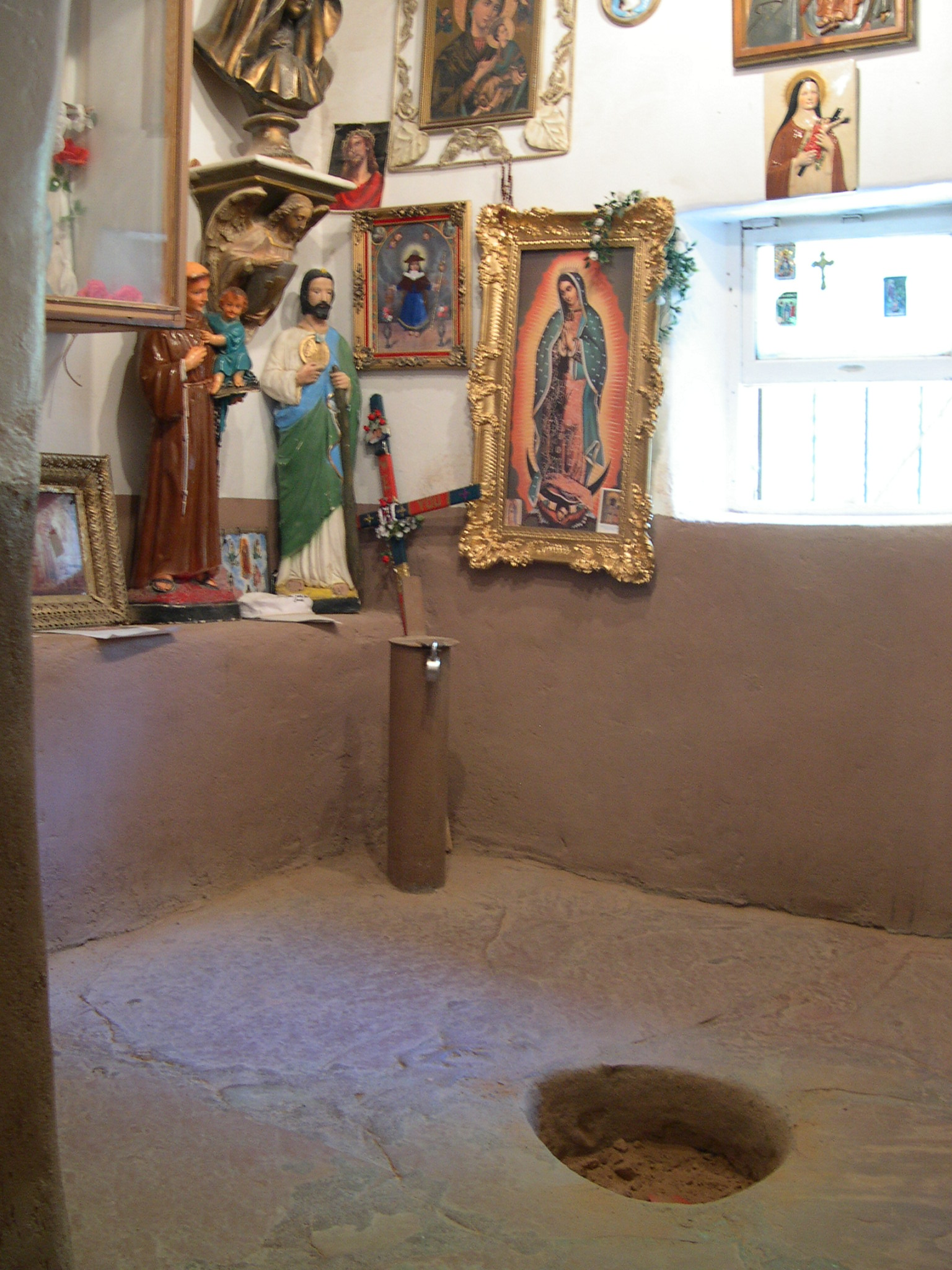
El Pocito room showing hole containing "holy dirt"

Each year some 300,000 people from all over the world make pilgrimages to the Santuario de Chimayó during Holy Week, especially on Holy Thursday and Good Friday, some seeking blessings and some in fulfillment of a vow. Walking is traditional; some pilgrims walk from as far away as Albuquerque, about 90 miles (150 km). While the pilgrimage began in the 19th century, it was revived by survivors of the Bataan Death March after World War II.

Many visitors to the church take a small amount of the "holy dirt", often in hopes of a miraculous cure for themselves or someone who could not make the trip. Formerly, at least, they often ate the dirt. (Likewise pilgrims to the original shrine of Esquipulas eat the supposedly curative clay found there.) Seekers of cures more commonly rub themselves with the dirt or simply keep it. The Church replaces the dirt in the pocito from the nearby hillsides, sometimes more than once a day, totalling up to 25 or 30 tons a year.

The Church takes no position on whether miracles have occurred at the Santuario.

The feast of Our Lord of Esquipulas is celebrated on January 15 or on the Sunday nearest that date. The feast of St. James the Great (Santiago) is celebrated on the fourth weekend of July.

== Legends ==
Some say that before the Spaniards arrived, a hot spring that then flowed near the site was sacred to the Tewa Indians for its healing powers.

One version of the legend says that during Holy Week, Abeyta (or a friar) saw a light shining from the hillside and dug the crucifix up with his bare hands. He turned it over to Fr. Álvarez, who took it to the Santa Cruz church, but the crucifix mysteriously returned to the spot where Abeyta found it. After the third time this happened, Álvarez and Abeyta decided to build a chapel on the spot to house the crucifix.

Another version says Abeyta was watching his sheep and contemplating his blessings, though he was sick, when a vision of his patron saint, San Esquipula [sic], beckoned to him. He went to the place where the saint had appeared and knelt; he was cured immediately. Other people also were cured there, and Abeyta built the chapel in thanks.

Yet another version says that the crucifix had belonged to a priest from Esquipulas who accompanied the first Spanish settlers in Chimayo. He was killed by Indians and buried in Chimayo. A flood of the Santa Cruz River (a small tributary of the Rio Grande) in the spring of 1810 uncovered the body and the crucifix. People who remembered the priest dedicated the shrine to the Christ of Esquipulas.

== Skeptical reception ==
In 2013 skeptical investigator Joe Nickell wrote that "claims made for holy dirt at Chimayo are unwarranted. Despite borrowed and contrived legends that the site is miraculous, the soil is actually an ordinary variety trucked in from elsewhere and merely blessed."

Researcher Benjamin Radford reported finding little evidence to corroborate claims of miraculous cures in his 2014 book Mysterious New Mexico.

== Gallery ==
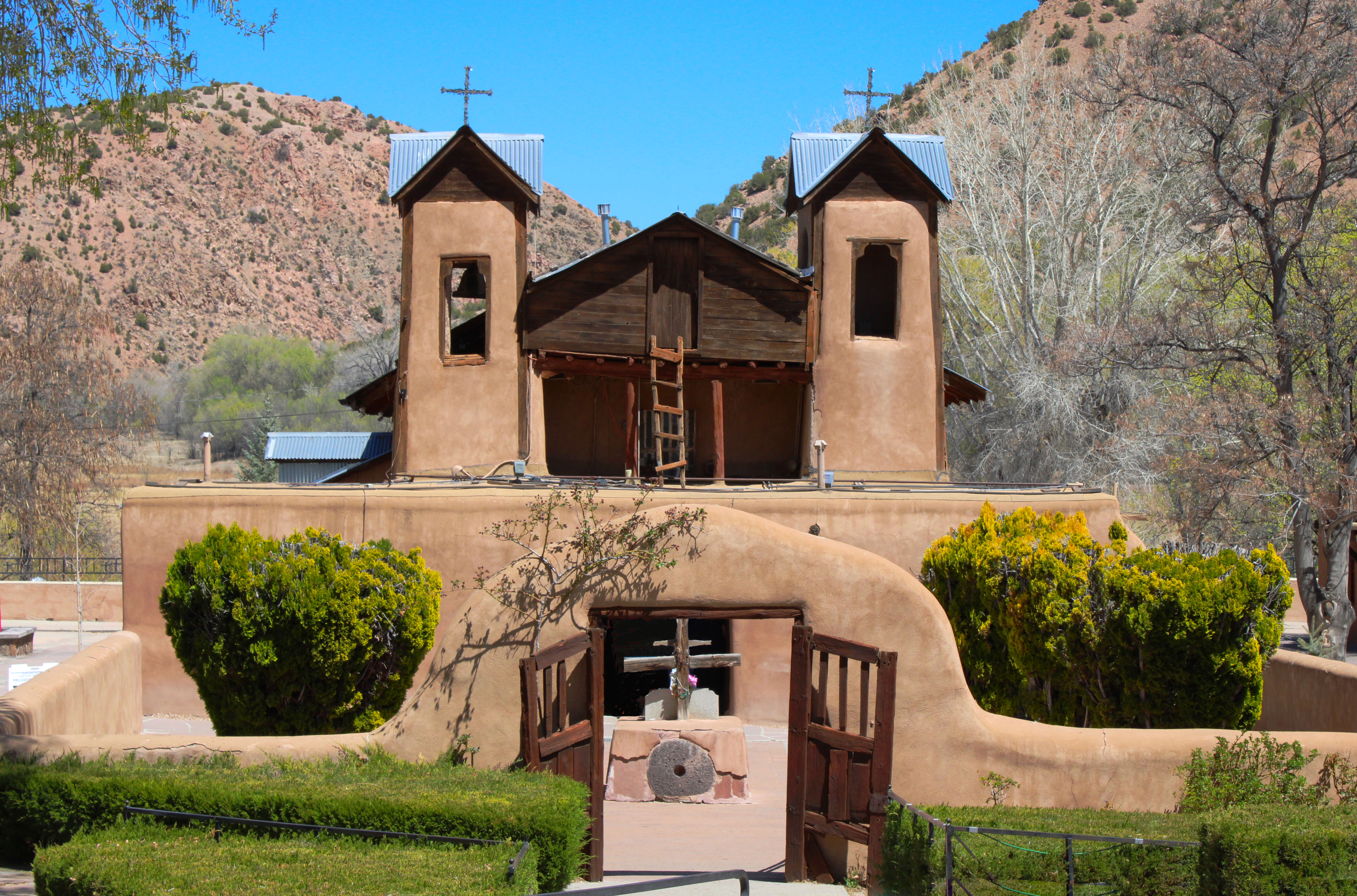
Santuario de Chimayo Church

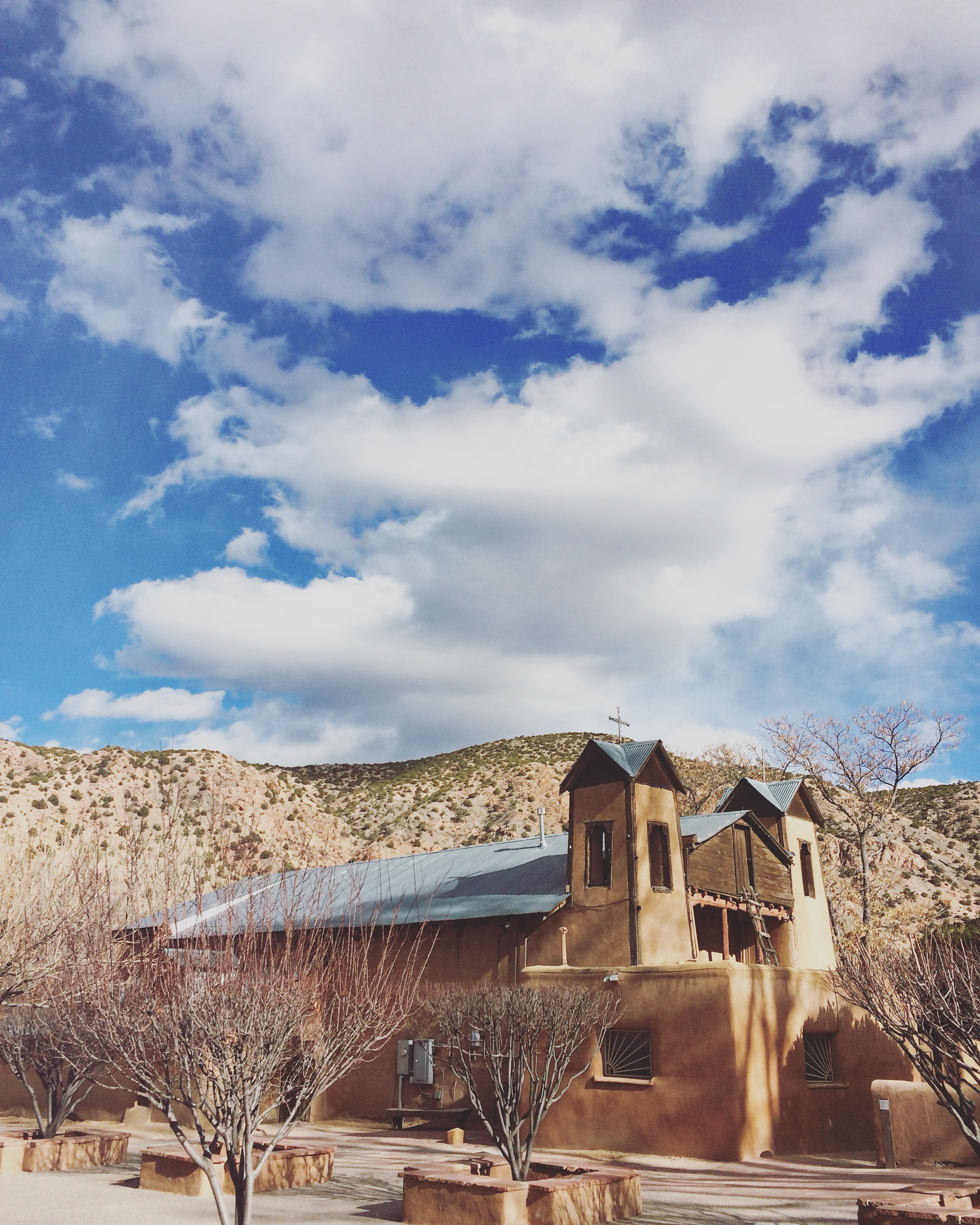
From the front courtyard in February.

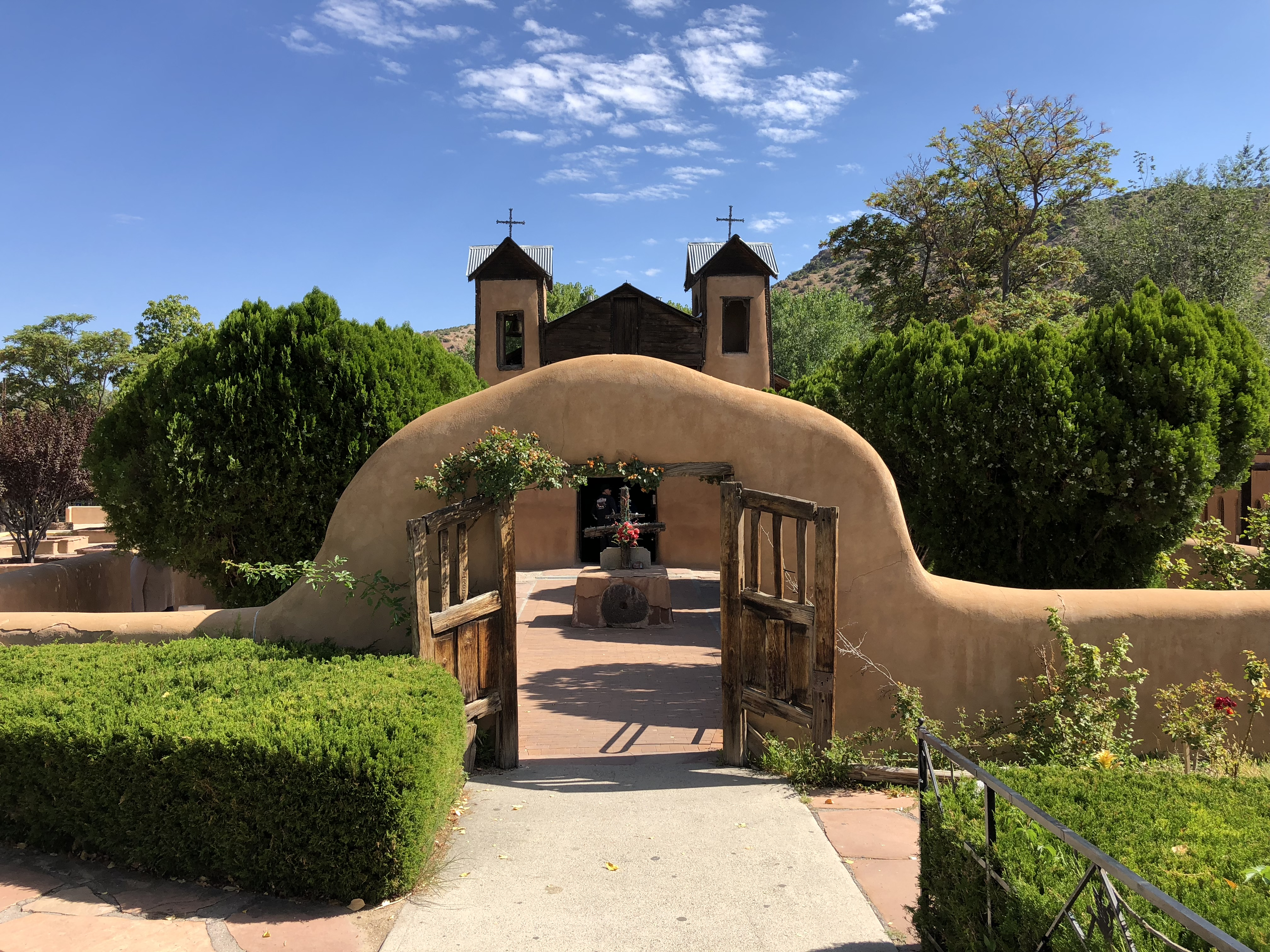
Entrance way into the church courtyard.

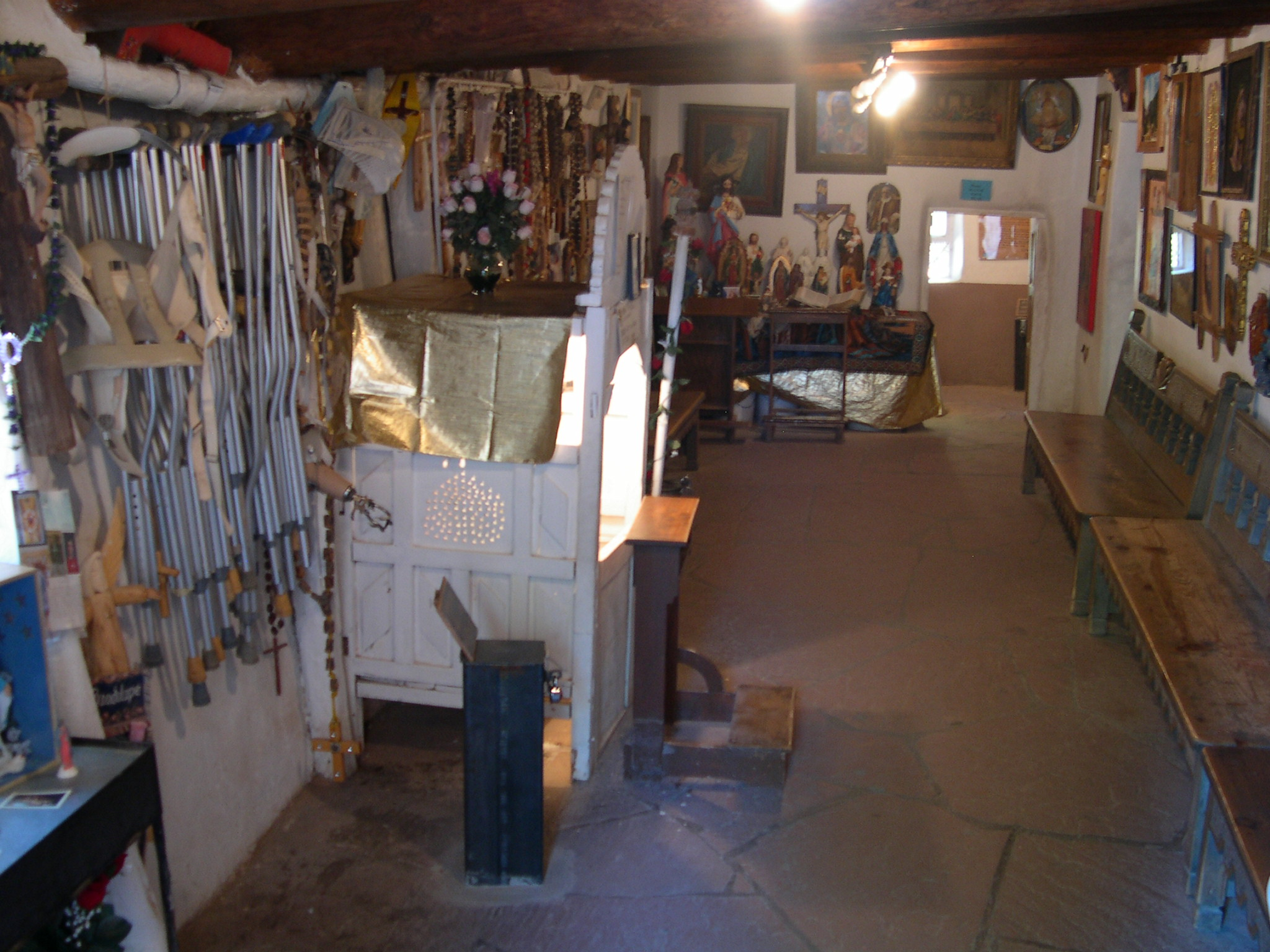
Prayer Room with discarded crutches and testiminonials

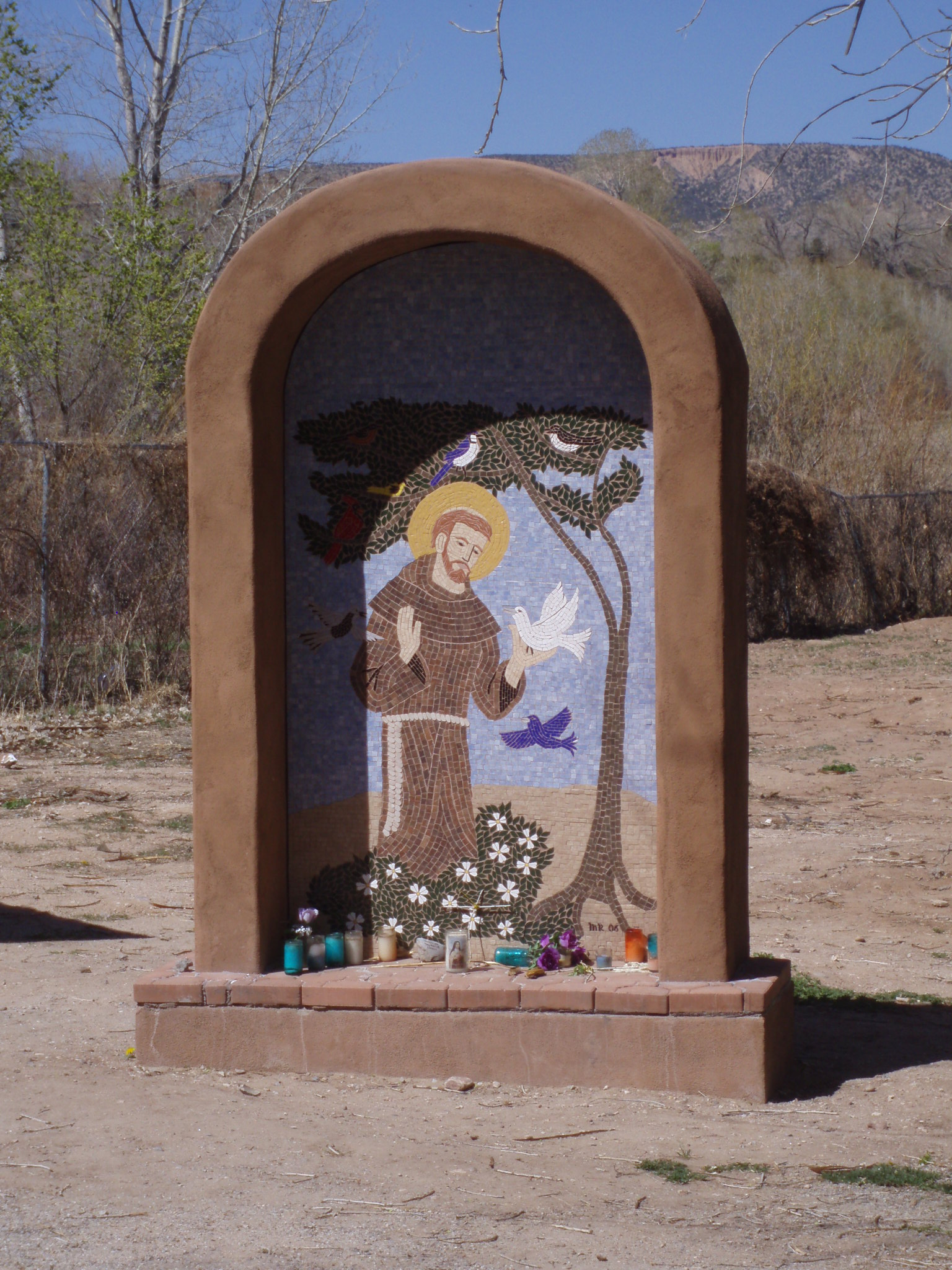
Shrine to St. Francis of Assisi

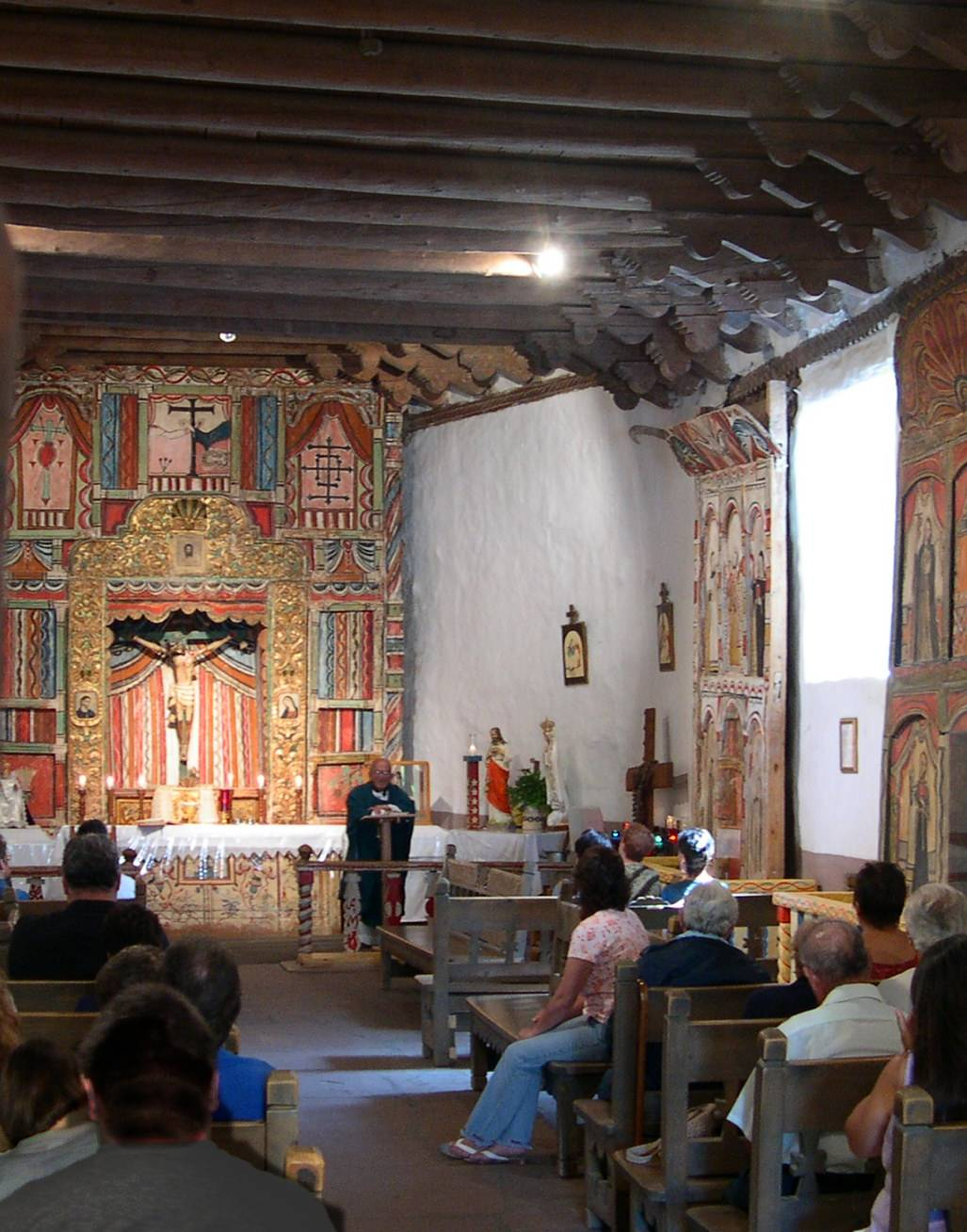
Interior

=== Pilgrimage, Good Friday, March 21, 2008 ===
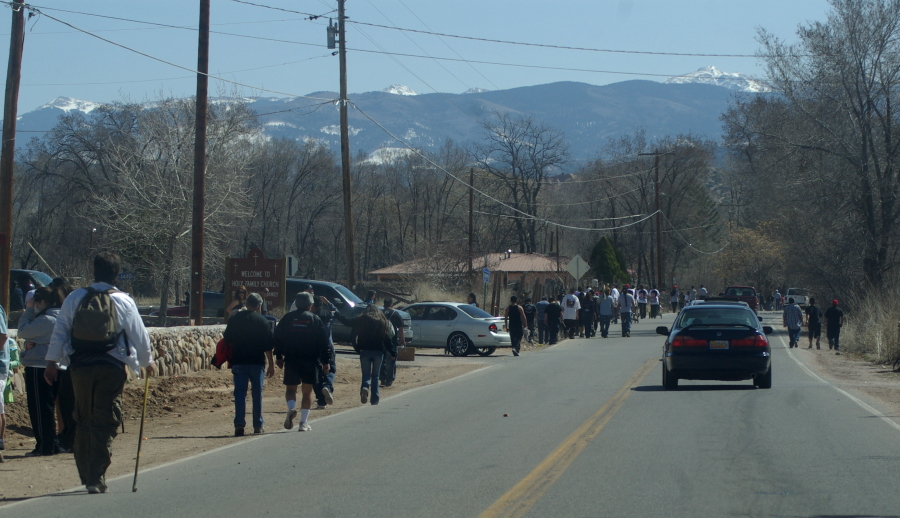
Walkers in front of the Holy Family church

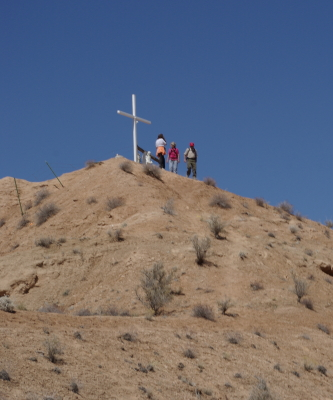
Hilltop shrine

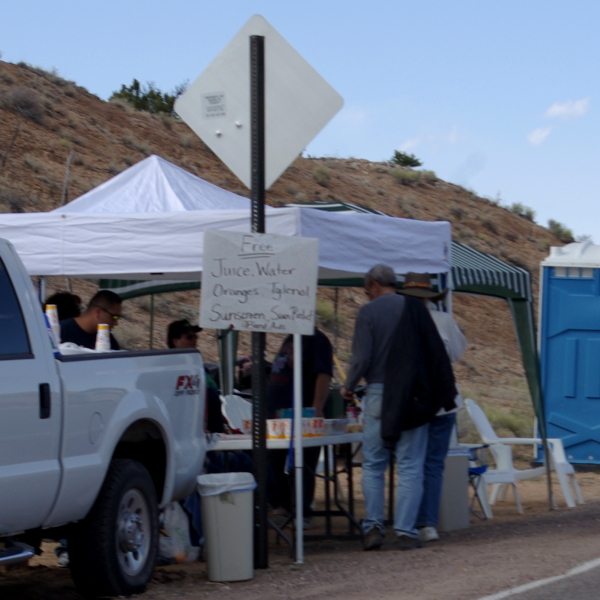
Aid station for pilgrims

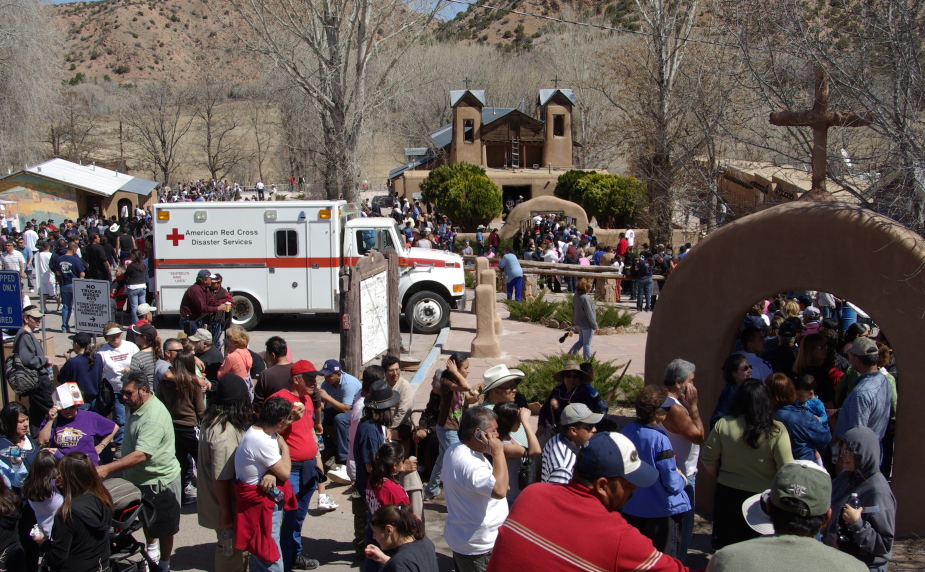
Pilgrims waiting to get into Santuario

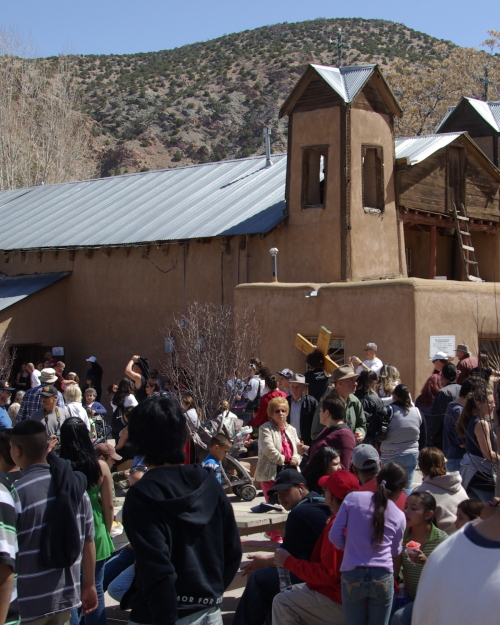
Crowd of pilgrims, including man carrying cross

== See also ==
- Top eight Catholic pilgrimage destinations in the US
- Cristos Negros of Central America and Mexico
- National Register of Historic Places listings in Santa Fe County, New Mexico
- List of National Historic Landmarks in New Mexico
