= Mariano Rossell y Arellano =

Guatemalan Roman Catholic clergyman

- Archbishop of Guatemala
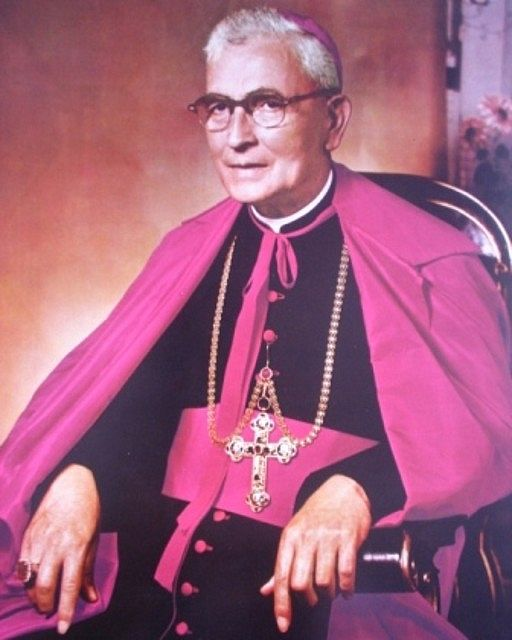
- Mariano Rossell y Arellano
- Church: Catholic Church
- Archdiocese: Archdiocese of Guatemala
- In office: 8 January 1939 – 10 December 1964
- Predecessor: Luis Durou y Sure
- Successor: Mario Casariego y Acevedo
- Other post: Prelate of Esquipulas (1956-1964)

Orders
- Ordination: 21 September 1918 by Julián Raymundo Riveiro y Jacinto
- Consecration: 16 April 1939 by Albert Levame

Personal details
- Born: 18 July 1894 Esquipulas, Guatemala
- Died: 10 December 1964 (aged 70)

Mariano Rossell y Arellano (18 July 1894, Esquipulas, Guatemala - 10 December 1964, Guatemala City) was a Guatemalan Roman Catholic clergyman. He was the fifteenth archbishop of Guatemala from 1939 to 1964 and the first Prelate Nullius of Esquipulas. He played a decisive role during the rule of colonel Jacobo Arbenz (1951–1954), accusing him of communism and atheism in sermons and services. After Arbenz's overthrow, he managed to retain the church's right to own property and to run schools, as well as setting up the Jesuit-run Rafael Landivar University and gaining the promotion of the prelature's main church to minor basilica status.

== Sources ==
- David M. Cheney. "Archbishop Mariano Rossell y Arellano [Catholic-Hierarchy]". catholic-hierarchy.org.
