= Black Christ =

Black Christ may refer to:

- Race and appearance of Jesus#African
- Black Christ statue, the name or description of several works
