= Cathedral Basilica of Esquipulas =

Baroque church in Esquipulas, Guatemala

Coordinates: 14.5618°N 89.3509°W

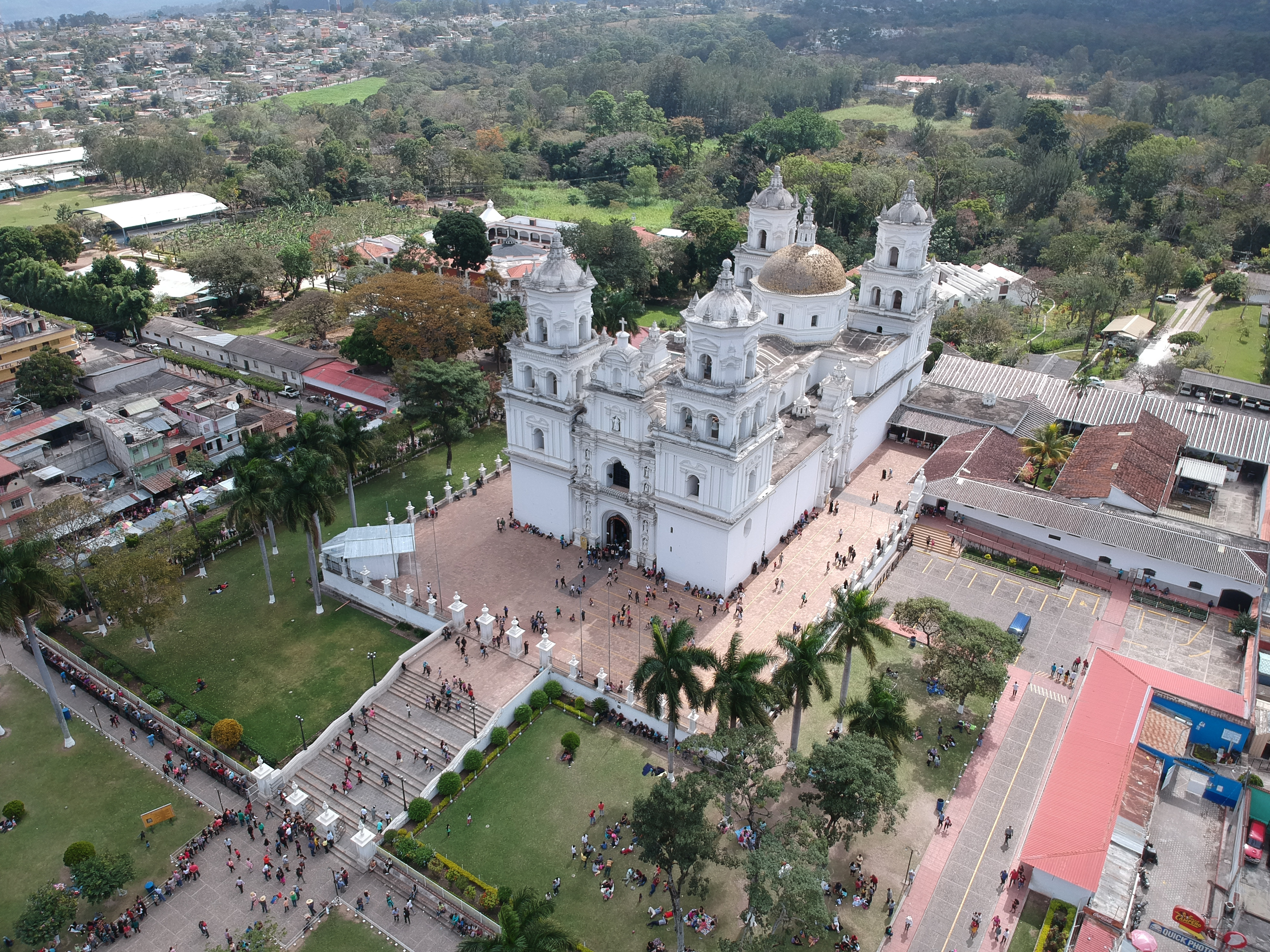
The Basilica of Esquipulas.

The Basilica of Esquipulas or Cathedral Basilica of the Black Christ of Esquipulas (Spanish: Basílica de Esquipulas or Catedral Basílica del Cristo Negro de Esquipulas) is a Baroque church in the city of Esquipulas, Guatemala, named after the image of the Black Christ of Esquipulas which it houses. It is the largest Roman Catholic church in Central America and southern Mexico and the only one in America with four bell-towers. It has the status of cathedral, minor basilica and Catholic sanctuary.

== History ==
The statue of the Black Christ (El Cristo Negro) was commissioned by Spanish conquistadors and carved in 1594 by Quirio Cataño in Antigua and installed in the church in 1595. The history of the Basilica begins in 1735, when a priest named Father Pedro Pardo de Figueroa experienced a miraculous cure after praying before the statue. When he became Archbishop of Guatemala, he commissioned a basilica to shelter the statue. The church was completed in 1759. It is visited by about 4.5 million pilgrims annually, including 1.5 million in the days leading up to its patronal festival on 15 January and the festival on 9 March which marks the date of the image's arrival in the city in 1595. On a visit in 1840, the anthropologist John Lloyd Stephens described the church as the town's "only object of interest".

The church was promoted to cathedral status by pope Pius XII in 1956 as the seat of the new Territorial Prelature of Santo Cristo de Esquípulas, whose first prelate Mariano Rossell y Arellano (the senior archbishop of Guatemala) sought to set up a Benedictine monastery attached to the cathedral to care for it - this was founded in 1959 by three monks sent from St. Joseph Benedictine Abbey in Louisiana. He also successfully petitioned pope John XXIII to promote the church to minor basilica status in 1961. It was visited on 6 February 1996 by Pope John Paul II during his second Apostolic Visit to Guatemala to mark the four-hundredth anniversary of the veneration of the Black Christ.
