= Black Christ of Esquipulas =

Wooden image of Christ

Coordinates: 14.5618°N 89.3509°W

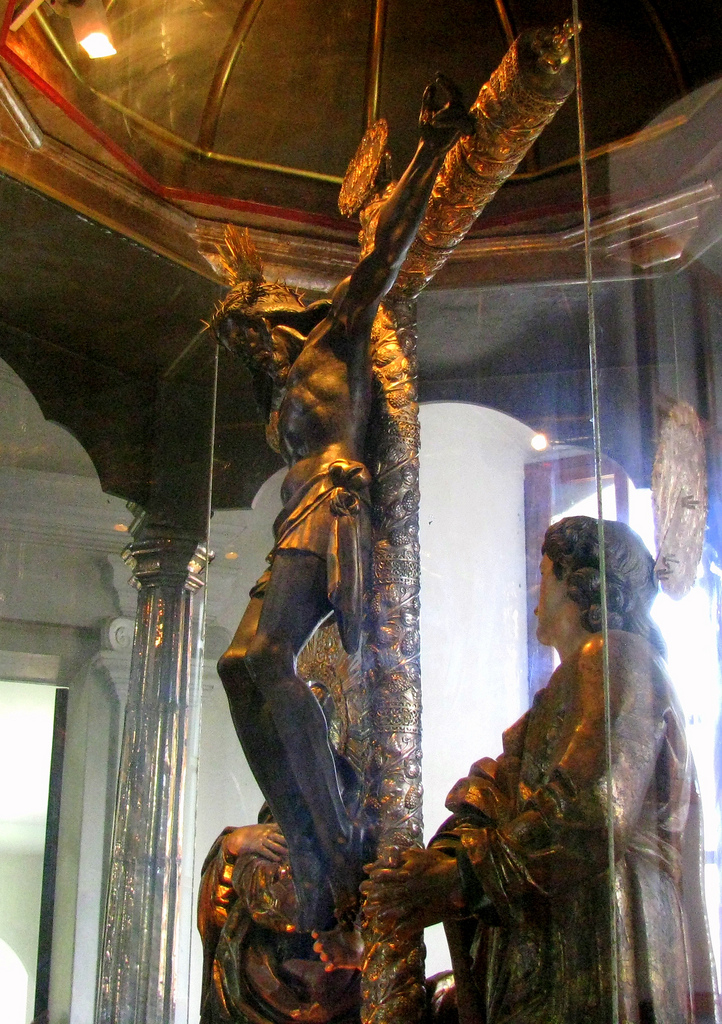
The original image of the “Black Christ of Esquipulas”

The Black Christ of Esquipulas is a darkened wooden image of Christ enshrined within the Cathedral Basilica of Esquipulas in Esquipulas, Guatemala. It is one of the famed black Christological images of Latin America.

Pious legends claim the image was darkened due to Spanish missionaries who wished to convert the natives who worshiped pagan nebular deity "Ek-Kampulá" in the area.

By the 17th century, a devotion associated with an image became known as the "Miraculous Lord of Esquipulas" or the "Miraculous Crucifix venerated in the town called Esquipulas". Esquipulas holds its patronal festival on January 15, when the largest number of pilgrims come from Guatemala and neighboring Central American countries. The shrine of El Santuario de Chimayó in Chimayo, New Mexico also honors the image. A pending application for Canonical coronation of the image was submitted to the Vatican.

== History ==
There are few early sources on the development of the religious veneration of the image and pilgrimage to its site. According to tradition, the image was found in a cave and had healing power. According to scholarly work, the image was sculpted by a Portuguese artist in 1594. In the late nineteenth century, the cult was buffeted by the political conflicts between conservatives who supported the Catholic Church and Guatemalan liberals, who were anticlerical, seeking to diminish the power of the Church. The Catholic hierarchy in Guatemala sought to increase its reach and to reinforce ideas that it symbolized a stance against leftists Juan José Arévalo and Jacobo Árbenz in the late 1940s and early 1950s who were considered socialists or communists. The color of the image was not highlighted during this era, but rather the focus was on the importance to Catholicism. However, "the color of the image would become its defining characteristic by the 1980s, when it became a site where the war-ravaged nation could seek peace and justice."

== Replica ==
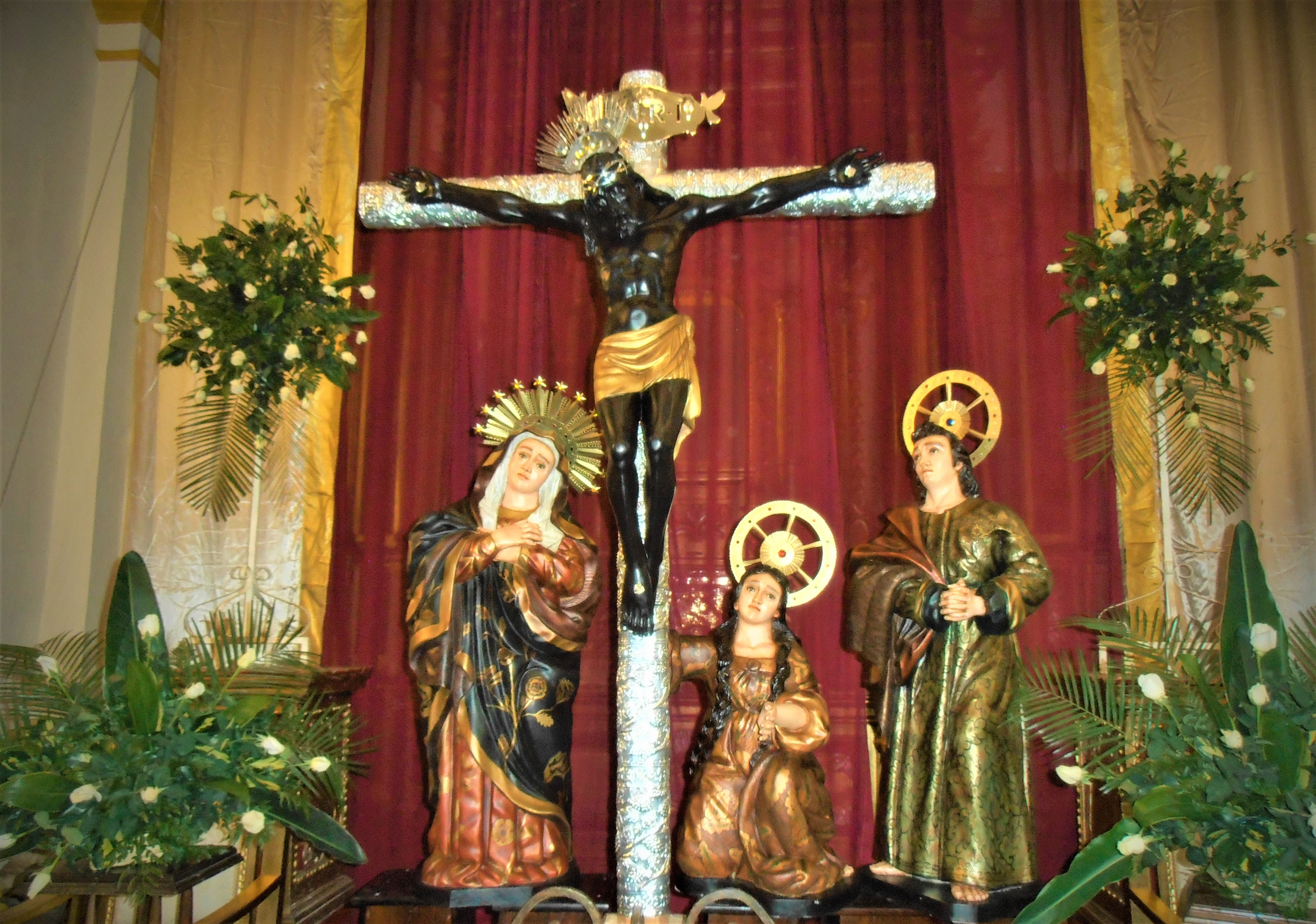
A replica of the image of Black Christ of Esquipulas at Saint Joseph Cathedral of Antigua Guatemala

On January 11, 2021, during the COVID-19 pandemic, a replica of the Christ of Esquipulas and its accompanying images (Virgin of Sorrows, Mary Magdalene, and Saint John the Apostle) were donated by Dr. Jorge Ruano Rossil to the San José Cathedral in Antigua Guatemala.

== Modern pilgrimages ==
More than 30,000 motorcyclists, many masked and costumed, rode from Guatemala City on the 59th pilgrimage to honor the Black Christ of Esquipulas on February 1, 2020.

== See also ==
- Cathedral Basilica of Esquipulas
