= Chimayo, New Mexico =

- CDP
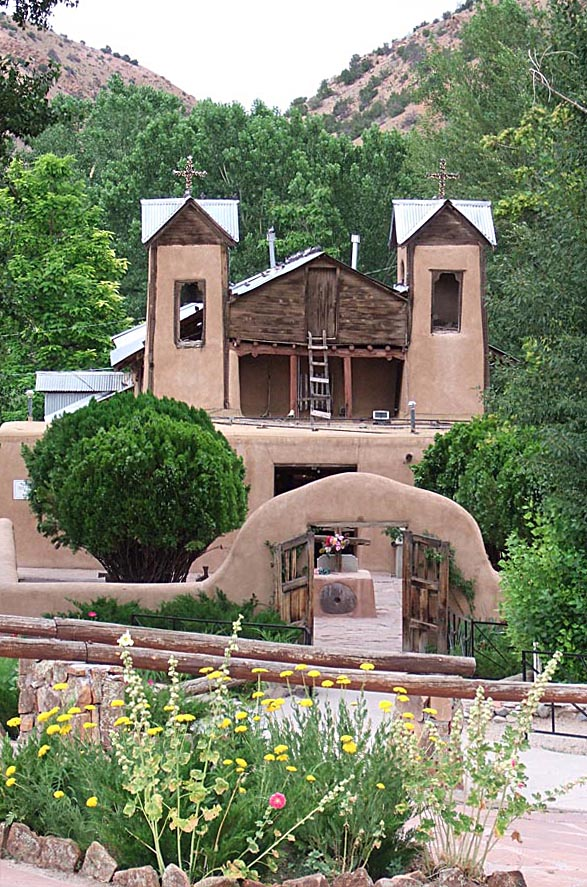
- El Santuario
- Nicknames: El Potrero Santificado, Chima
- Location of Chimayo, New Mexico

- Location in the United States Chimayo (the United States)
- Coordinates: 36°00′13″N 105°56′38″W
- Country: United States
- State: New Mexico
- Counties: Rio Arriba, Santa Fe

Government
  - County Commission: Barney Trujillo (Rio Arriba) Henry Roybal (Santa Fe)

Area
  - Total: 7.74 sq mi (20.05 km^{2})
  - Land: 7.74 sq mi (20.04 km^{2})
  - Water: 0.0077 sq mi (0.02 km^{2})
- Elevation: 6,067 ft (1,849 m)

Population (2020)
  - Total: 3,077
  - Density: 397.7/sq mi (153.57/km^{2})
  - Demonym: Chimayoan
- Time zone: UTC-7 (Mountain (MST))
  - Summer (DST): UTC-6 (MDT)
- ZIP code: 87522
- Area code: 505
- FIPS code: 35-14950
- GNIS feature ID: 2408026

Chimayo is a census-designated place (CDP) in Rio Arriba and Santa Fe counties in the U.S. state of New Mexico. The name is derived from a Tewa name for a local landmark, the hill of Tsímáyôe, meaning "good flaking stone" (i.e., obsidian of superior quality. The town is unincorporated and includes many neighborhoods, called plazas or placitas, each with its own name, including El Potrero de Chimayó (the plaza near Chimayo's communal pasture) and the Plaza del Cerro (plaza by the hill). The cluster of plazas called Chimayo lies near Santa Cruz, approximately 25 miles north of Santa Fe. The population was 3,177 at the 2010 census.

== Background ==
The Potrero plaza of Chimayo is known internationally for a Catholic chapel, the Santuario de Nuestro Señor de Esquipulas, commonly known as El Santuario de Chimayó. A private individual built it by 1816 so that local people could worship Jesus as depicted at Esquipulas; preservationists bought it and handed it over to the Archdiocese of Santa Fe in 1929. The chapel is managed by the Archdiocese as a Catholic church. For its reputation as a healing site (believers claim that dirt from a back room of the church can heal physical and spiritual ills), it has become known as the "Lourdes of America," and attracts close to 300,000 visitors a year, including up to 30,000 during Holy Week (the week prior to Easter). It has been called "no doubt the most important Catholic pilgrimage center in the United States." The sanctuary was designated a National Historic Landmark in 1970.

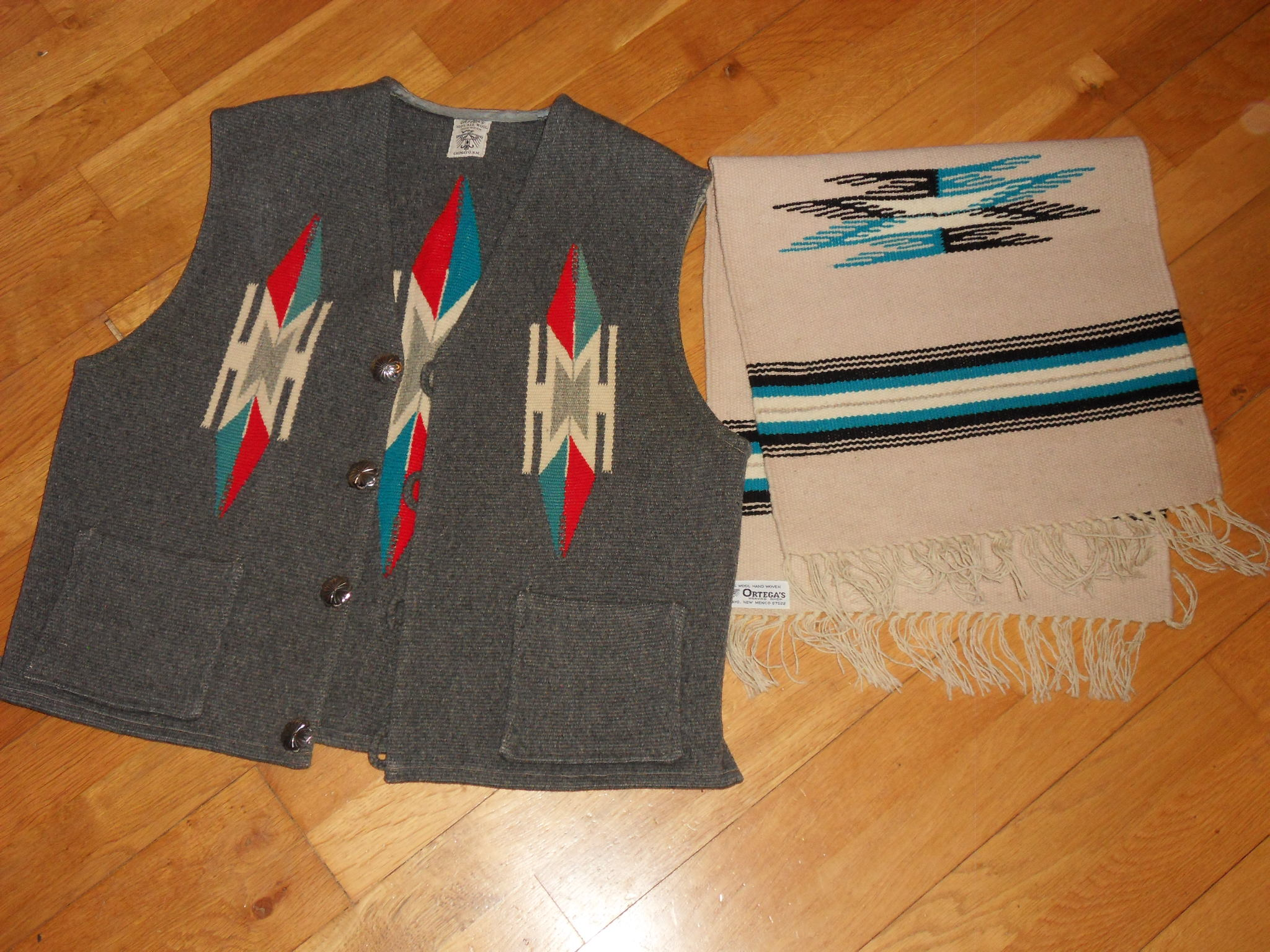
Men's vest c.1960, and small blanket, both by Ortega Weavers

Chimayo has long been an important site for the Hispanic weaving traditions of northern New Mexico, and an important style of weaving which developed between 1920 and 1940 is named after the town. The Chimayó style is characterized by well-developed transverse bands and a prominent central motif. The central motif is usually diamond or hourglass shaped and very elaborate. Because of how Anglo-Americans were interested in native American designs, products from Chimayo were marketed as Indian goods up until the early 1940s. Chimayo is particularly known for the weaving traditions of the Ortega and Trujillo families, who have been weaving in the Spanish Colonial tradition for many generations and operate weaving businesses near the Plaza del Cerro and in the placita of Centinela. Their traditional craft is but one of several still practiced in the region, including tin smithing, wood carving, and making religious paintings. These activities, along with the local architecture and the landscape of irrigated fields, create a historic ambiance that attracts much tourism.

On Jan. 26, 1991, 7 were killed in a shooting rampage in the town.

== Culture ==
Chimayo figures prominently in Now Eleanor's Idea, an opera by Robert Ashley. Ashley describes Chimayo in his foreword to the libretto as "the spiritual center of the lowrider world...Now Eleanor conceives of a television documentary program to study the exotic lowrider community...in the car shops" of Chimayo. Act II, Scene 2 is a recorded interview with Chimayo residents LowLow and Joan Medina.

The town is also known for its heirloom chile cultivar, the Chimayo pepper (Capsicum annuum 'Chimayo'). In 2003 the Native Hispanic Institute's founder Marie Pilar Campos authored the Chimayo Chile Project to replenish the 300-year-old native seed stock and revive the industry. The Chimayo Chile Project began planting in the spring of 2005, which is the foundation of its ongoing seed-distribution services to local farmers. The project's job development operations were funded by the United States Office of Community Services from 2005 through 2008. As part of the project's work with the state to revive the industry, two joint memorials have passed the New Mexico State Legislature. The Chimayo Chile Project incorporated the local farmers, Chimayo Chile Farmers, Inc. Chimayo Chile Farmers, Inc. applied for the certification mark "Chimayo" with the USPTO in 2006 and was granted registration in 2009. The 2008 New Mexico State Legislature, via New Mexico Department of Cultural Affairs, appropriated preservation support that resulted in the June 2009 publication, Chimayo Chile: A Living History of Faith, Culture, and Art, by Marie Pilar Campos of the Native Hispanic Institute.

== Geography ==
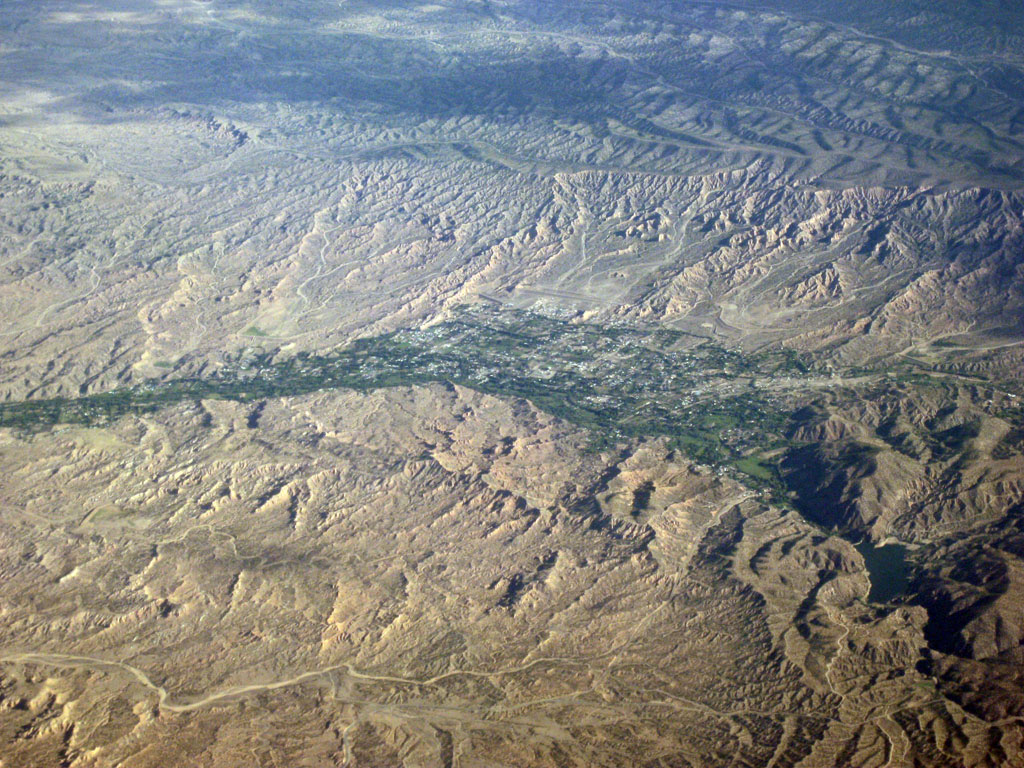
Oblique air photo of Chimayo and vicinity, including lake Santa Cruz in lower right. Facing north in August 2011.

Chimayo is sited in a valley within the Sangre de Cristo Mountains 24 miles (38.4 km) north of Santa Fe. Chimayo is approximately 6075 ft above sea level.

According to the United States Census Bureau, the CDP has a total area of 5.5 square miles (14.1 km^{2}), all land.

== Demographics ==
Historical population
Census	Pop.	Note	%±
2020	3,077		—
U.S. Decennial Census

=== 2020 census ===
As of the 2020 census, Chimayo had a population of 3,077. The median age was 48.0 years. 17.5% of residents were under the age of 18 and 24.2% of residents were 65 years of age or older. For every 100 females there were 92.1 males, and for every 100 females age 18 and over there were 91.6 males age 18 and over.

89.3% of residents lived in urban areas, while 10.7% lived in rural areas.

There were 1,315 households in Chimayo, of which 26.1% had children under the age of 18 living in them. Of all households, 40.4% were married-couple households, 21.8% were households with a male householder and no spouse or partner present, and 30.7% were households with a female householder and no spouse or partner present. About 29.8% of all households were made up of individuals and 15.8% had someone living alone who was 65 years of age or older.

There were 1,480 housing units, of which 11.1% were vacant. The homeowner vacancy rate was 0.4% and the rental vacancy rate was 1.4%.

Racial composition as of the 2020 census
Race	Number	Percent
White	1,336	43.4%
Black or African American	14	0.5%
American Indian and Alaska Native	28	0.9%
Asian	7	0.2%
Native Hawaiian and Other Pacific Islander	0	0.0%
Some other race	614	20.0%
Two or more races	1,078	35.0%
Hispanic or Latino (of any race)	2,681	87.1%

=== 2000 census ===
As of the census of 2000, there were 2,924 people, 1,150 households, and 808 families residing in the CDP. The population density was 535.9 inhabitants per square mile (206.9/km^{2}). There were 1,323 housing units at an average density of 242.5 per square mile (93.6/km^{2}). The racial makeup of the CDP was 48.6% White, 0.1% African American, 0.7% Native American, 0.01% Asian, 44.8% from other races, and 5.7% from two or more races. Hispanic or Latino of any race were 90.8% of the population.

There were 1,150 households, out of which 34.6% had children under the age of 18 living with them, 48.3% were married couples living together, 15.7% had a female householder with no husband present, and 29.7% were non-families. 26.2% of all households were made up of individuals, and 8.1% had someone living alone who was 65 years of age or older. The average household size was 2.54 and the average family size was 3.05.

In the CDP, the population was spread out, with 25.3% under the age of 18, 9.1% from 18 to 24, 29.5% from 25 to 44, 23.9% from 45 to 64, and 12.2% who were 65 years of age or older. The median age was 36 years. For every 100 females, there were 100.4 males. For every 100 females age 18 and over, there were 98.9 males.

The median income for a household in the CDP was $31,474, and the median income for a family was $35,938. Males had a median income of $28,009 versus $24,357 for females. The per capita income for the CDP was $17,023. About 14.1% of families and 19.0% of the population were below the poverty line, including 27.4% of those under age 18 and 28.6% of those age 65 or over.

== Education ==
Chimayo is in Española Public Schools. It has an elementary school, Chimayo Elementary. The comprehensive public high school is Española Valley High School.

It had two small private schools until 2002, when the John Hyson Memorial School Presbyterian, pre-kindergarten to sixth grade; closed, and the Camino de Paz School and Farm (Montessori, 7th to 12th grade) was suspended as of the 2023–24 school year.

== Transportation ==
Chimayo is served by North Central Regional Transit District buses.
