= Cristos Negros of Central America and Mexico =

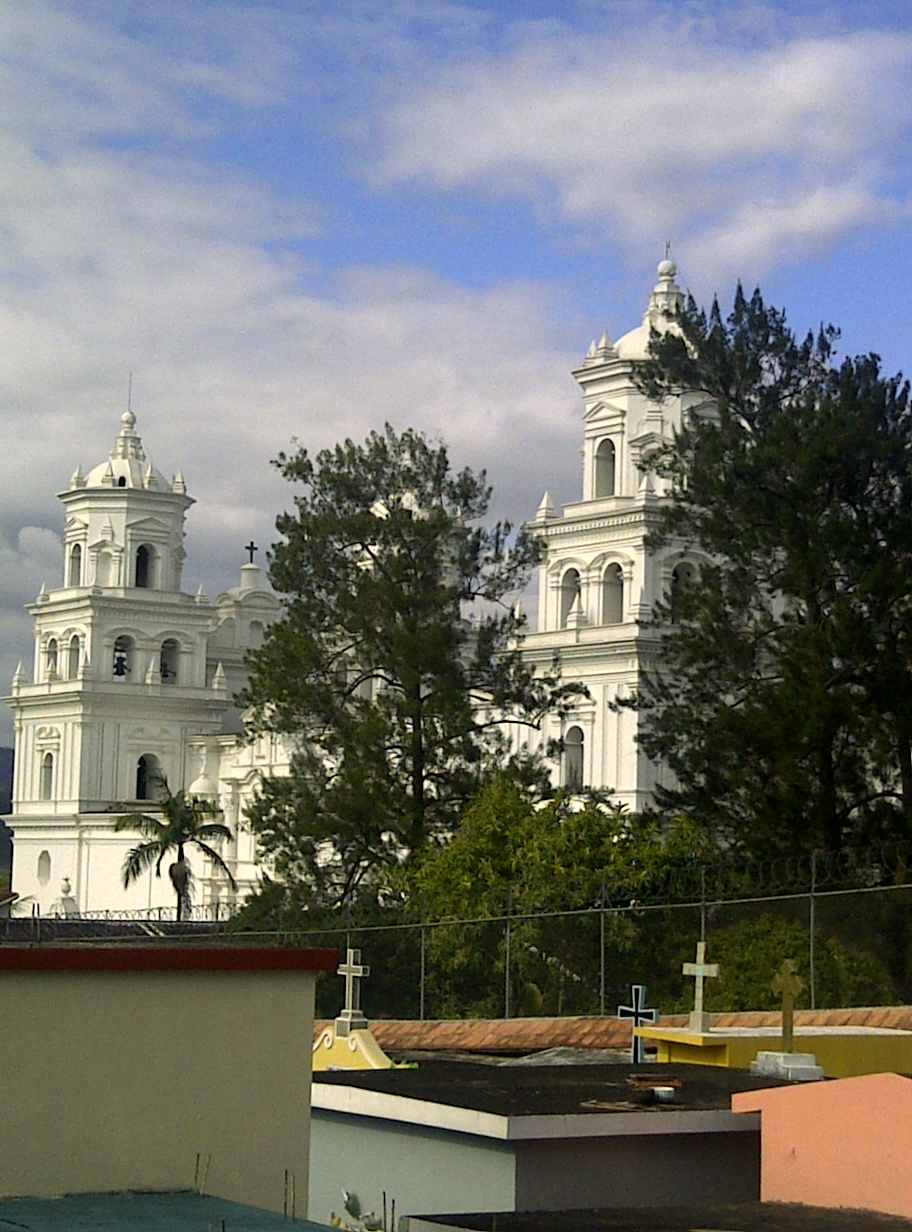
Basilica of the Cristo Negro of Esquipulas in Guatemala

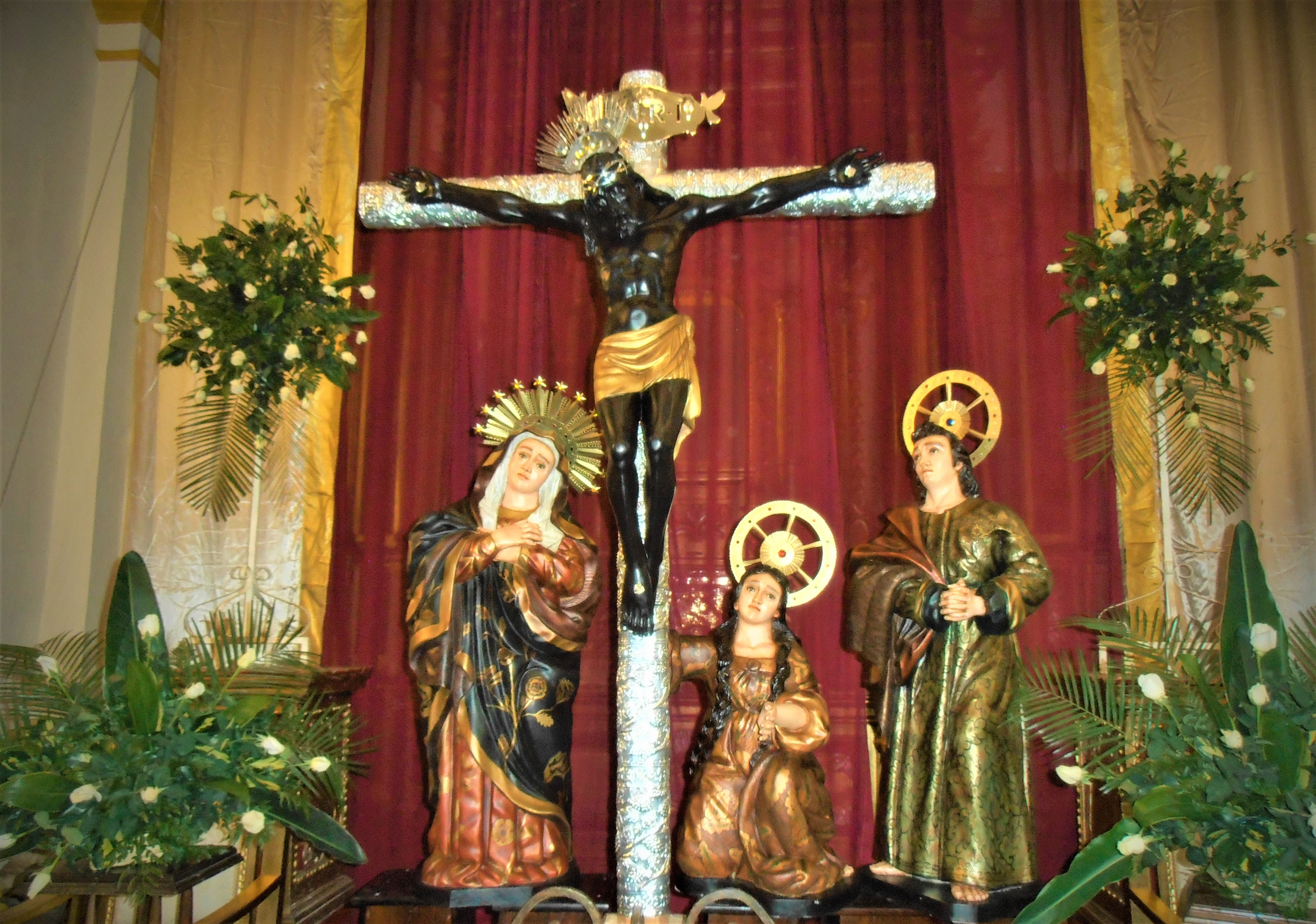
Black Christ of Esquipulas at Saint Joseph Cathedral of Antigua Guatemala

The Cristos Negros or Black Christs of Central America and Mexico trace their origins to the veneration of an image of Christ on a cross located in the Guatemalan town of Esquipulas, near the Honduran and Salvadoran border. This image was sculpted in 1595 in wood and over time it blackened and gained a reputation for being miraculous. Little is known of how veneration of the image was spread by clergy, although there are records of its introduction in various locations, especially in Central America, southern Mexico, central Mexico (especially in areas near Mexico City) and even as far north as New Mexico. However, a number of these images, such as the ones in Chalma, State of Mexico and Mérida, Yucatán have origin stories that do not connect the local image with that of Esquipulas. The Cristo Negro of Esquipulas remains an important symbol for Central America, with its sanctuary the most visited site in the region. On January 11, 2021, during the COVID-19 pandemic, a beautiful replica of the Christ of Esquipulas and its accompanying images (Virgin of Sorrows, Mary Magdalene, and Saint John the Apostle) were donated by Dr. Jorge Ruano Rossil to the San José Cathedral in Antigua Guatemala, unleashing an irrepressible and renewed veneration for the Black Christ among its followers. Antigua Guatemala is a city formerly known as Santiago knights of Guatemala and declared Humanity's Cultural Heritage by the UNESCO in 1979. There are hundreds of other such images with at least local importance with Christ of Chalma attracting millions of visitors, second only to that of the Virgin of Guadalupe in Mexico. The popularity of the image continues to spread, with Central American and Mexican migrants bringing the image to the United States and Canada, founding new sanctuaries.

== History ==
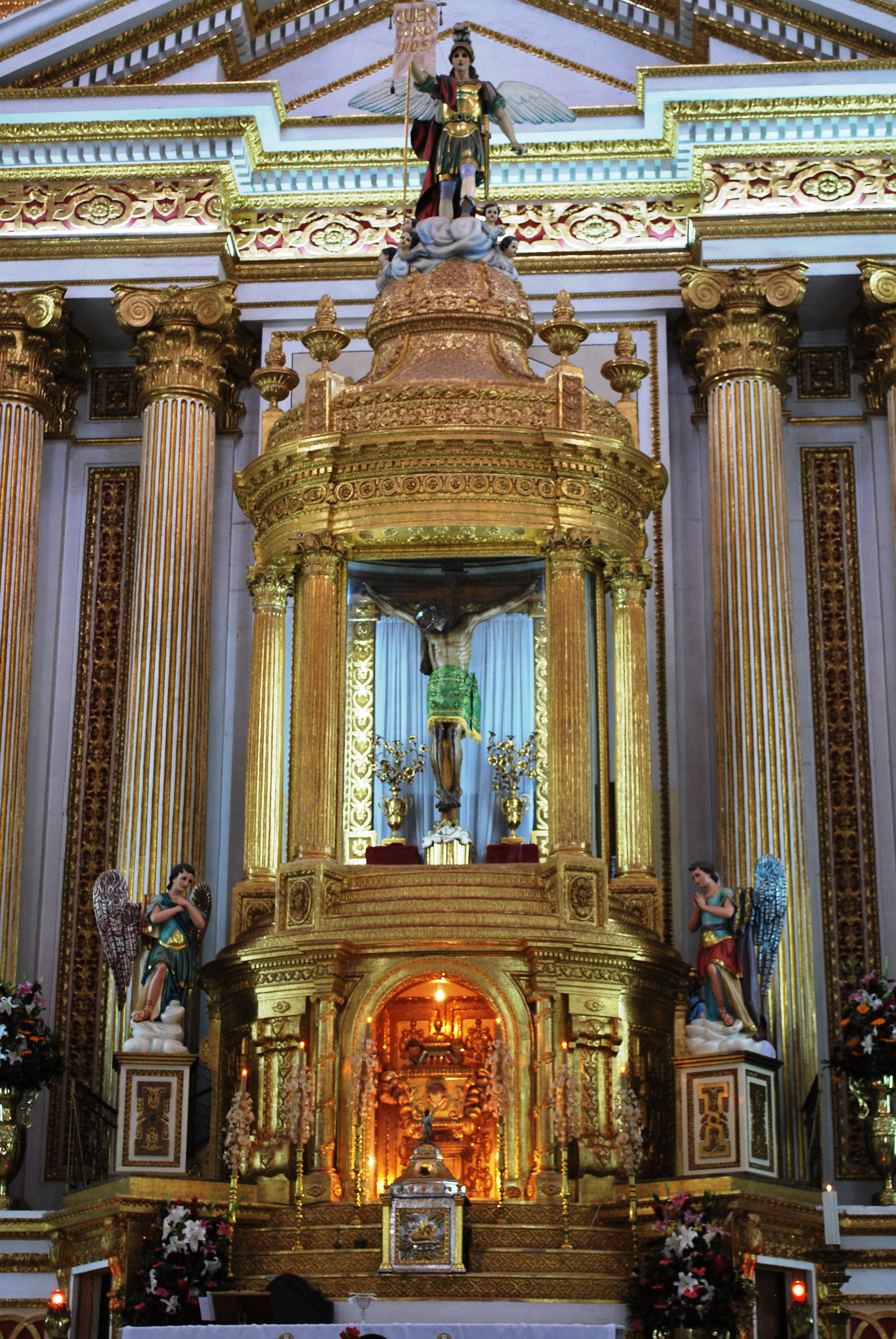
Main altar with the Our Lord of Chalma in the State of Mexico

Although the veneration of the Virgin Mary, especially in the form of Our Lady of Guadalupe is famous in Mexico and to some extent in Central America, there has been a strong tradition of venerating images of Christ, especially crucifixes, which was more prominent than that of Mary in the colonial period. This has its origins in the practices of Catholic Europe at the time of the Spanish conquest of the Aztec Empire, themselves derived from medieval traditions. At least two thirds of Mexico's Christ shrines were focused on crucifixes, and like in Europe, many of these Christ images have been purported to sweat or bleed and even spontaneously restore themselves after deterioration. Most of the Christ shrines originated early in the 17th century and a number gained importance into the 18th and 19th centuries. One reason for the devotion to images of Christ and the Virgin Mary is that there was little tradition of the veneration of saints' relics as there was in Europe. The Americas had few saints before the papacy of John Paul II.

The veneration of "Cristos Negros", literally "black Christs", is to images of Jesus on the cross which are black in color. The origin of this phenomenon is traced to the town of Esquipulas, Guatemala, a small town near the border of Honduras and El Salvador. This an image that was carved in wood in the late 16th century, which in time darkened to a black color and miracles were ascribed to the image. Since the veneration of the Esquipulas image was established, there has been a process of diffusion of its veneration. Documentation of this spread is spotty and little in known of monks and clergy who spread veneration of this type of crucifix by introducing replicas to other areas in Central America and Mexico. Evidence that the Cristos Negros in other areas are related to that of Esquipulas includes documentation of the work of missionary Antonio Margil (1657–1726) who worked in Central America and Mexico and is linked to black Christ images in Tila, Chiapas and Querétaro . Other evidence includes records of replicas being sent to places such as the Nuestra Señora del Carmen church in La Antigua Guatemala (later to Guatemala City) in 1701, El Sauce and Tipitapa, Nicaragua in 1720 and 1755 respectively, the Pacific coast of Panama, in the 18th century, Moroleón, Guanajuato in the 19th century and the introduction of the image by Franciscan priests in Nueva Galicia (today Jalisco) in the mid 18th century. By the end of the 18th century, there are records of replica in various parts of Central America along with festivals dedicated to the image, with the spread continuing in the 19th century. One other indication of the spread from Guatemala include ranches with the suffix "de Esquipulas" found in Central America, Chiapas and Tabasco.

However, most of the black Christ images have origin stories that do not relate to Esquipulas, rather than they were found or otherwise appeared in small communities in rural locations from the 17th to 18th century. Many of these stories also show links to pre Hispanic beliefs such as images being associated with caves, springs and clay/mineral deposits associated with deities common in the Mesoamerican world, with the Christ images taking over many of these deities’ aspects.

The spread of Cristo Negro shrines or sanctuaries have mostly been confined to Central America, southern Mexico (especially Chiapas and Oaxaca), with some important images near Mexico City and one in New Mexico. The original Esquipulas shrine has been managed by Benedictine monks since 1959, who work to support its prominence, lately made easier by the more tranquil political situation in the region, allowing for more pilgrimages.

Academic documentation of these shrines began in the early 20th century, with important surveys done in 1987 and 2011.

With Central American and Mexican migration to the United States and Canada, the image of the Cristo Negro, especially that directly associated with Esquipulas, has received new importance in new areas. The image is invoked by Hondurans and Guatemalans contemplating the journey, and the image has become the patron of Central Americans in the United States. New sanctuaries have been established in U.S. and Canadian cities and even a replica of the Esquipulas image was brought from Guatemala to Los Angeles (using illegal immigration routes) and has been dubbed the "Cristo Mojado" (lit. "wet Christ") with "mojado" in reference to illegal immigrants.

== The Cristo Negro of Esquipulas ==
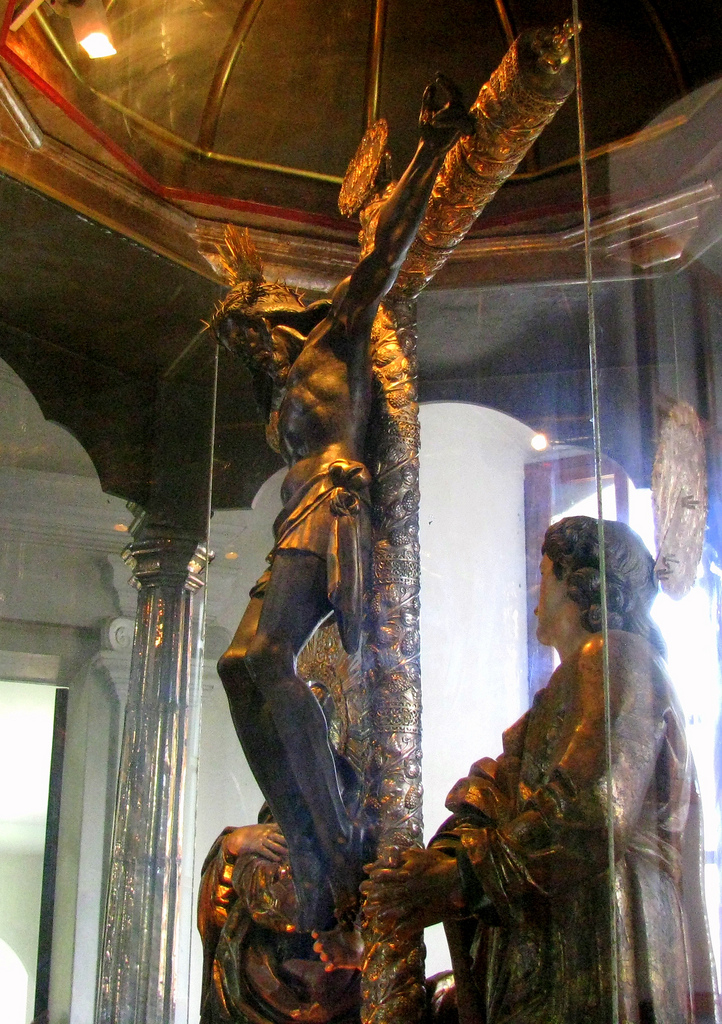
The image in its glass case

The Cristo Negro of Esquipulas is the earliest and most famous images of its kind, and is the most venerated image in Central America. It originated in this town, 222 km from the capital of Guatemala in 1595, when it was commissioned and made by Quirio Cataño.

Its famous color comes from the fact that the wood darkened over time. By 1737, various miracles had been ascribed to it and a sanctuary was built, where it remains today. The popularity of this image and sanctuary has led to Esquipulas being called the "Central American Capital of Faith".

Much of its popularity come from its acceptance among indigenous peoples, such as the Mayas. The town of Esquipulas itself is at a place where there was veneration of a Mayan god called Ek Chuaj .

Today over a million people visit the shrine each year, making it one of the most important in Latin America. The fest day of this Christ image, January 15, brings pilgrims from much of Central America into southern Mexico, especially Chiapas. Esquipulas was visited by John Paul II in 1996.

In Esquipulas and many other sanctuaries, the Christ image is placed on a raised altar with stairs, which allows worshippers to ascend approach the images from in front and behind. In the past, worshippers could touch the image but today it is encased in glass. Visitors leave offerings at the foot of the images, an extension of the tradition of doing the same to the earth gods to assure the well-being of loved ones.

== Other Black Christ sanctuaries ==
=== Extension of Cristo negro shrines/sanctuaries ===
Cristo negro images can be found in sanctuaries and shrines primarily in Central American and Mexico, with a few in the United States. Many of these came to prominence from the 18th to 20th centuries, with mostly local and regional followings but several such as the image in Chalma and the Cristo Renovado de Santa Teresa and the Stone Cross of Querétaro have national and international following. However, devotion to the Cristo negro far from the town to Esquipulas depends on these secondary sanctuaries, especially those outside of Central America.

In 1987 the first extensive list of sanctuaries dedication to this type of image was compiled. Most of these sanctuaries are inside churches or chapels, but in a few cases they are sanctuaries operated by families. A few are also found in traditional Mexican markets and at the entrances of villages as well. This was followed by a 2011 study indicating 272 sanctuaries of at least local importance, extending from Panama into southern Mexico. About one third are in Mexico and 31% are in Guatemala. Twenty four percent are in El Salvador and Honduras with nine percent in other parts of Central America. In Mexico, most of the sanctuaries are in Chiapas and Oaxaca (71%) as well as to the south and west of Mexico City. There are also some in Veracruz and Tabasco along the Gulf coastline. In Central America, the sanctuaries are mostly located in population centers, especially on the Pacific coast and near the town of Esquipulas. One reason for this in both Mexico and Central America was that in the colonial period, the Gulf coasts were more sparsely populated. One exception to this is the north coast of Honduras because of its importance to Caribbean trade. Nineteen of these are major pilgrimage sites, with 72 receiving visitors from smaller regions, but are more than simply local shrines.

=== Notable shrines/sanctuaries ===
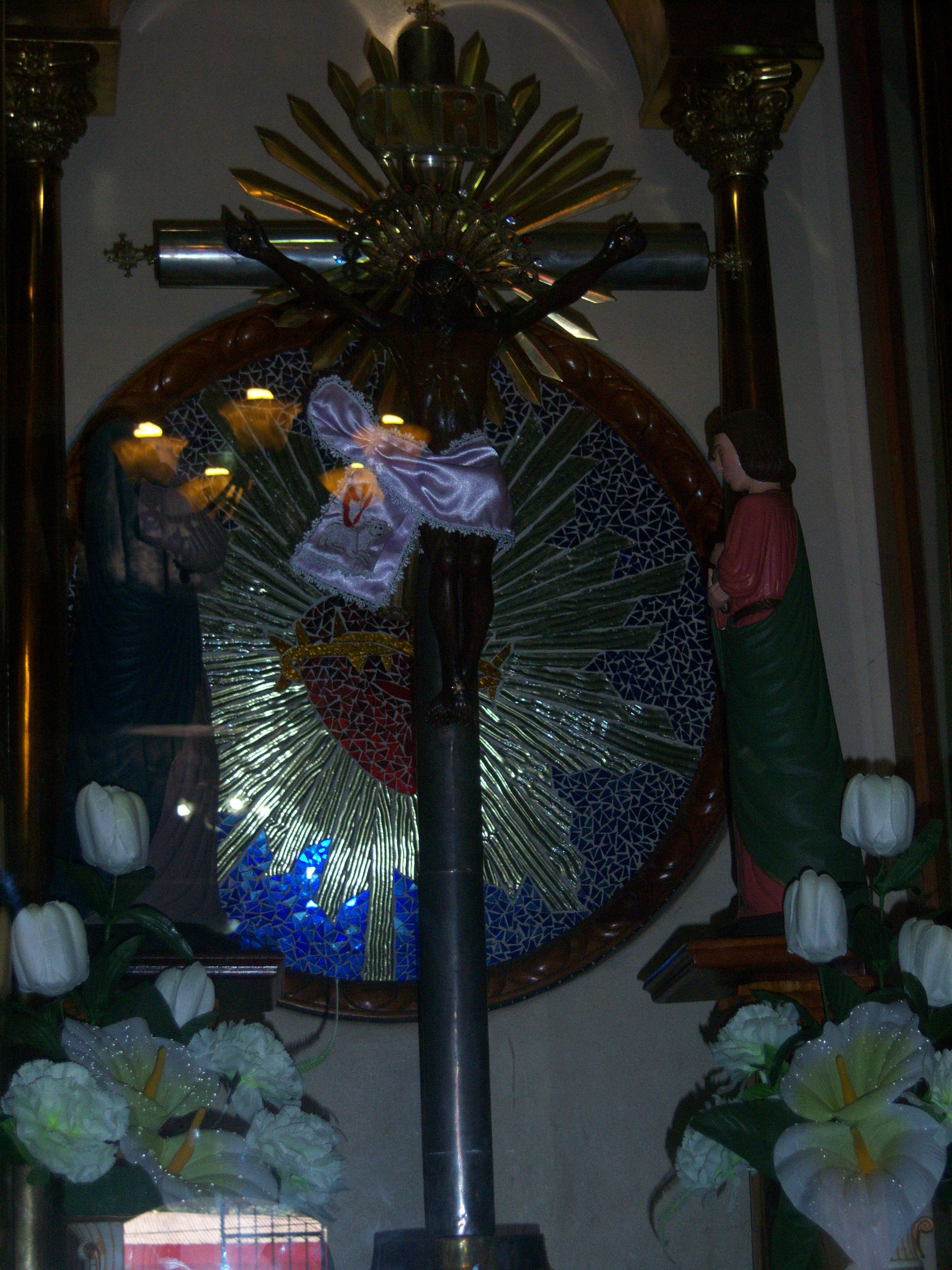
The image in El Sauce, Nicaragua

The Sanctuary of Chalma is one of the most-visited pilgrimage site in Mexico, only second behind the Basilica of Our Lady of Guadalupe, with over two million visitors each year. Most of these come from central and southern Mexico, but the site has received visitors from all over the world. The Cristo Negro in this sanctuary is said to have come from a nearby cave, which had been the center for worship of a god called Ostoc Teotl. Legend states that the idol of the pre Hispanic deity was replaced by the black crucifix. Pilgrimage to the site includes participating in pre Hispanic dance at the church atrium.

The Cristo Negro of El Sauce, León Department, Nicaragua, also known as Our Lord of Miracles, commemorated 290 years of existence in 2013. The name of the town, which means "the willow", commemorates the finding of the image here under that type of tree. Like the image in Esquipulas, its feast day is January 15 and is currently house in the National Sanctuary of Our Lord of Miracles.

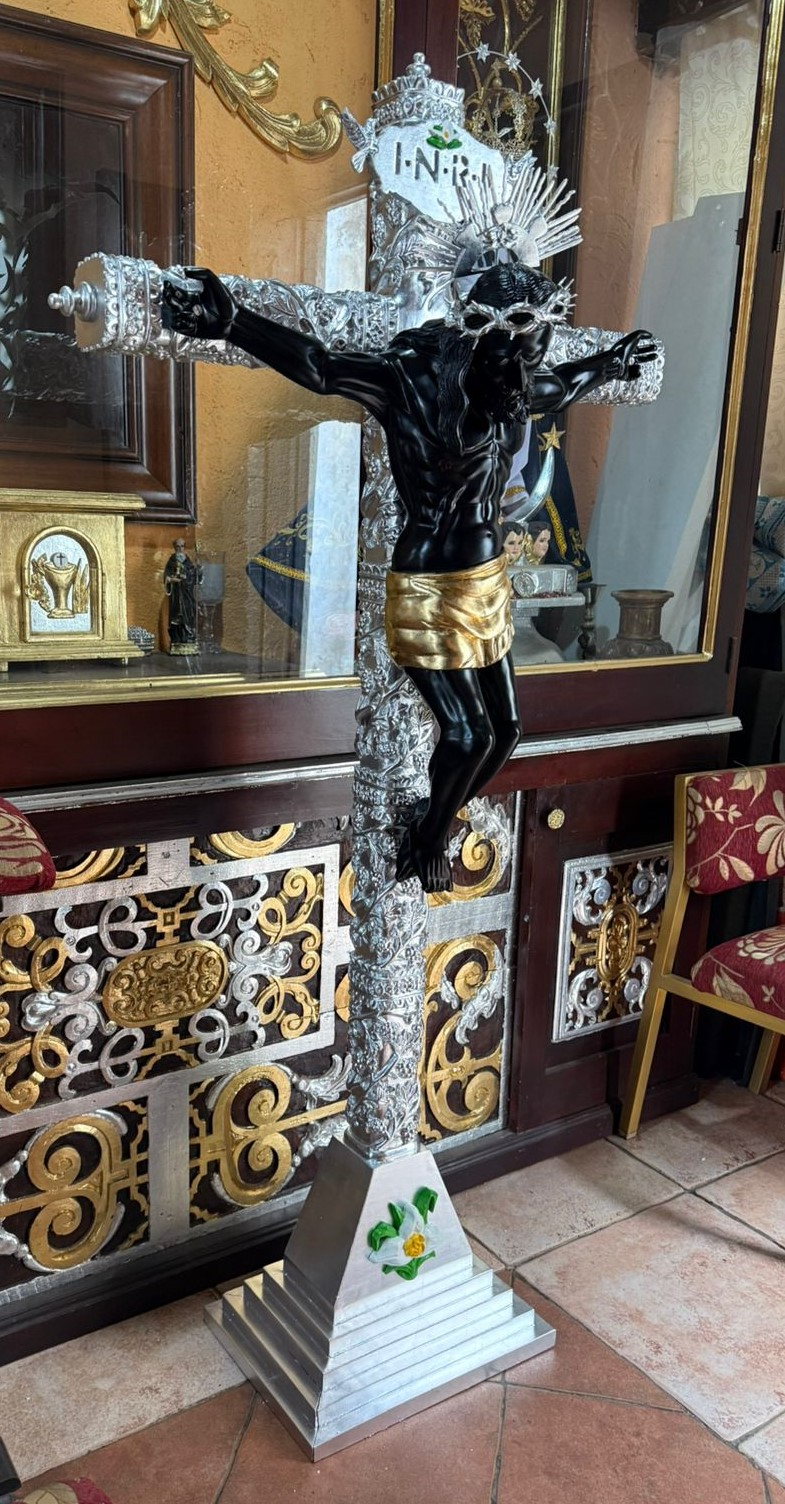
Black Christ of Esquipulas, El Cuastecomate, Ejutla, Jalisco

In the community of El Cuastecomate, in the municipality of Ejutla, Jalisco, there is a chapel dedicated to the Lord of Esquipulas. It was built by Dr. Jorge Ruano Rossil, a retired United States scientist, who also donated its beautiful Black Christ sculpture. He wrote the song "Don't Close Your Arms to Me, My Lord of Esquipulas", to welcome the Christ of Esquipulas into this community. A small image of the Christ of Esquipulas, also donated by the same doctor, is now venerated by the people of San Juan de Amula in the municipality of El Limón, Jalisco.

The Cristo Negro shrine in Arena Blanco, El Progreso, Yoro, Honduras is a major pilgrimage site January 15, attracting up to 10,000 people, as the image here is recognized as a replica of the one in Esquipulas. This event attracts visitors from various countries in Central America and even from Puerto Rico and Spain.

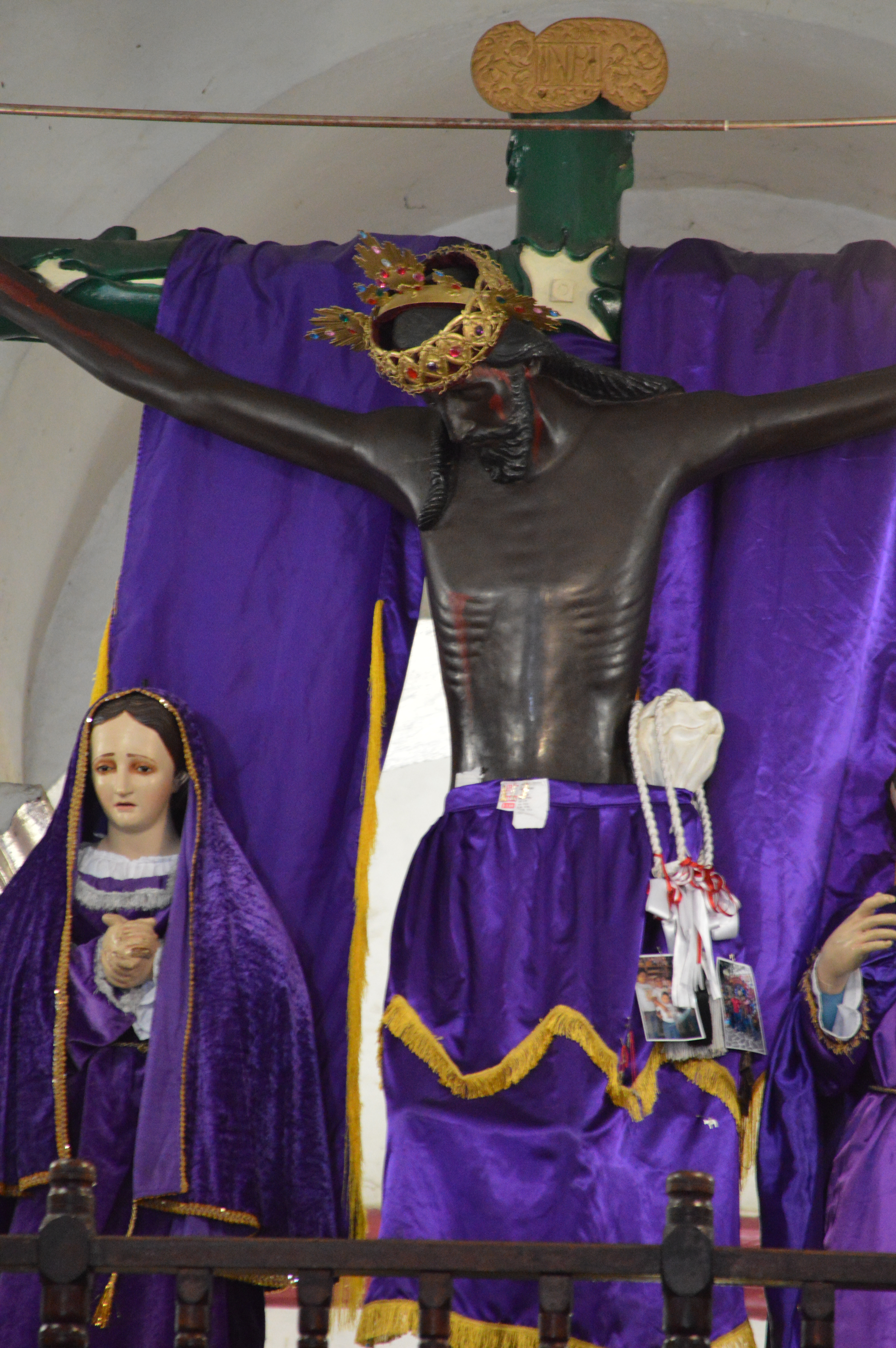
The "Black Christ" of Otatitlán

The Cristo Negro of Otatitlán is in the parish church of the town. There are two stories of the origin of this particular image. One states the Spanish king Philip II had the three Black Christ images commissioned, which then went on to their current locations. Another story says that the image was found on the Day of the Cross by an indigenous person at the foot of a tree in the village of Puctlanzingo, which was then claimed by the Mazatecos of the region. Later it was moved on the Papaloapan River on a raft to its current location. During the Cristero War in the 1930s, the image was taken by men allied with then governor of Veracruz, Adalberto Tejada, who tried unsuccessfully to burn it. Instead it was decapitated. The headless image returned to Otatitlán and a replacement was made. In 1950, the original head was found and returned, with the replacement head now kept in a glass case. The devotion to this image is a syncretism. It is not unusual for there to be a mass followed by a ritual cleansing by a local "brujo" (roughly witch doctor). The major feast day for this image is May 3, Day of the Cross, with events beginnings on April 28 and extending to May 7. The event can attract up to 150,000 people from Veracruz and other parts of Mexico.

The Señor de Tila is a Cristo Negro images with a link to the Esquipulas image, sharing the same feast day of January 15, the same sanctuary design and many of the same rituals followed by pilgrims. However instead of made from wood, it is made from a stalagmite from a nearby cave. The story is that the residents of San Cristobal de las Casas came to sack the town, so the image "ran" and hid in a cave. When it was "rescued" years later, it had turned black. The sanctuary gained fame in the colonial period and has remained an important regional pilgrimage since, attracting visitors from as far as Tabasco and Campeche . Another important image in Chiapas is in Zinacantán, said to have been found in a sacred cave and is related to the extraction of salt in the area.

The mostly Huichol community of Huaynamota in El Nayar municipality of Nayarit has a Cristo Negro which is venerated with a mix of Catholic and pre Hispanic rites. Its feast day attracts hundreds of pilgrims. The origin of the image is unknown but there are various stories from appearing from thin air to being brought by the Jesuits in the 18th century, possibly from Guatemala. It has been said to sweat and bleed as well as cure the sick.

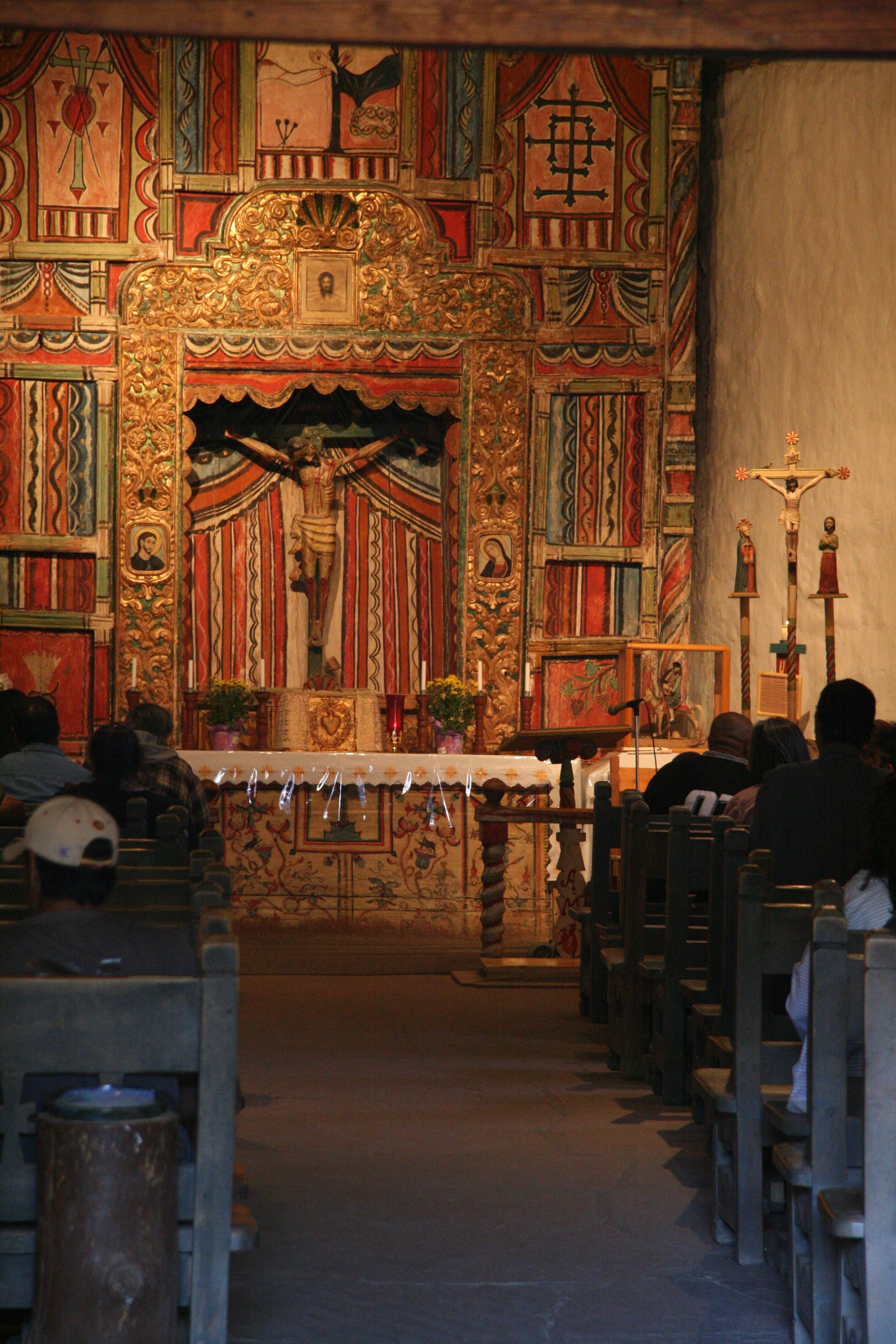
Inside the chapel of the sanctuary in Chimayo

El Señor de la Paz, also called the Cristo Negro of San Pablo Anciano near Acatlán de Osorio, Puebla was introduced between 1824 and 1830 by a local priest. At the time the various indigenous peoples were in conflict over resources. The image took on significance in Mixtec lore which tells of various indigenous deities in conflict and the role of the Cristo Negro as an intermediary. The Cristo de las Ampollas is a Cristo Negro image in Mérida, Yucatán, which since colonial times has been important to the population, especially the Mayan ethnicities. It originated in the village of Ichmul in the early 17th century, a cowboy and some peasants reported bright lights from a tree near the village to the parish priest. The priest had the tree cut down and brought to the parish and announced he would have it sculpted into an image of the Virgin Mary. A young man appeared from nowhere and said he could sculpt it. He asked to be locked into a workshop with no tools and a day later, disappeared, leaving behind the Cristo Negro. The image was moved to the church and soon after pilgrims began to visit. Later, the church burned to the ground, reducing everything to ashes except the image, which only blackened. Despite protests, the image was moved again to the cathedral in Mérida in 1645. In 1915, during the Mexican Revolution, the cathedral was sacked and the soldiers tried to burn the image, but could not. It was instead moved to a military base and not seen again. A replica was made in Querétaro and was consecrated in 1919. The feast day of the image is the Day of the Cross, May 3. In addition, the image is central to festivals related to the various main segments of Mérida society on different days, as it is considered the unofficial patron of the city.

The Chimayo Sanctuary in New Mexico is in honor of the Esquipulas image, established by Bernardo Abeyta." It is the most important Catholic pilgrimage center in the United States, attracting about 300,000 visitors per year . This site is related to a deposit of clay said to have medicinal qualities.
