= List of Catholic dioceses in Guatemala =

The Roman Catholic Church in Guatemala forms a single, entirely Latin Episcopal conference.

It comprises two ecclesiastical provinces (each headed by a Metropolitan Archbishop, with a total of 11 suffragan dioceses), three missionary pre-diocesan jurisdictions: one territorial prelature and two Apostolic vicariates, each headed by a (residential or titular) Bishop.

The only former jurisdictions have been promoted to their present status.

== Current Dioceses ==
=== Exempt missionary jurisdictions in Guatemala ===
These are directly dependent on the Holy See, notably the Roman Congregation for the Evangelization of Peoples.

- Apostolic Vicariate of El Petén
- Apostolic Vicariate of Izabal
- Territorial Prelature of Santo Cristo de Esquípulas, held in personal union with Zacapa bishopric

=== Ecclesiastical province of (Santiago de) Guatemala ===
- Metropolitan Archdiocese of (Santiago de) Guatemala
  - Diocese of Escuintla
  - Diocese of Jalapa
  - Diocese of (San Francisco de Asís de) Jutiapa
  - Diocese of Santa Rosa de Lima
  - Diocese of Verapaz, Cobán
  - Diocese of Zacapa (y Santo Cristo de Esquipulas)

=== Ecclesiastical province of Los Altos Quetzaltenango-Totonicapán ===
- Metropolitan Archdiocese of Los Altos Quetzaltenango-Totonicapán
  - Diocese of Huehuetenango
  - Diocese of Quiché
  - Diocese of San Marcos
  - Diocese of Sololá-Chimaltenango
  - Diocese of Suchitepéquez-Retalhuleu

== Sources and external links ==
- Catholic-Hierarchy entry.
- GCatholic.org.
