= Catholic Church in Guatemala =

The Catholic Church in Guatemala is part of the worldwide Catholic Church, under spiritual leadership of the Pope, Curia in Rome and the Episcopal Conference of Guatemala. There are approximately 7.7 million Catholics in Guatemala, which is about 46% of the total population of 17.1 million citizens.

== History ==
=== Introduction of Protestantism ===
Historically, Guatemala has been predominantly Catholic. Beginning in 1959, after Fidel Castro began the Cuban Revolution, the Holy See became increasingly aware of the number of Protestant missionaries traveling to Latin America. Following this realization, several Catholic priests and missionaries traveled to Latin America to increase the number of priests and baptized Latinos. Over the past few decades, Protestantism has grown throughout the area. Guatemala currently contains the largest number of Protestants (approximately 40%) than any other Latin American country. The largest Protestant denominations present in Guatemala today are Presbyterians, Pentecostals, Lutherans, Baptists, and Episcopalians. Protestants first began to arrive in Guatemala in 1882 as a result of President Rufino Barrios desire to challenge the power of the Catholic Church. He invited several Presbyterian, Methodist and Baptist missionaries, but only when Pentecostal missionaries arrived from the United States did Guatemala see an influx in Protestant converts.

=== Charismatic Catholicism ===
Charismatic Catholics is a religious movement that has a set mind to increase the number of Catholic converts. Its members in Guatemala increase the numbers of Catholics in Latin America with the help of social organizations, missionaries, and clergy. In the mid twentieth century, Catholic Guatemalans feared that Catholicism would become the minority to Protestantism. Many Catholics began converting to Protestantism instead during this time period. Also, there were very few native Guatemalan priests because this job was mostly taken up by missionaries from the United States. The Charismatic Catholics bounced back with a large number of foreign missionaries, an increase in Guatemalan priests, and other lay revitalization within the Church as a whole. They believed that "the quest for identity was important and difficult" in the changing modern times.

=== Status of Religious Freedom ===
There is no state religion in Guatemala, however the Guatemalan Constitution recognizes the legitimacy of the Catholic Church. The constitution also recognizes freedom of religion to all of its citizens, and the government protects and honors this law. Although the Catholic Church is the only religion recognized by the Guatemalan Constitution, any other religious affiliation can file a copy of its bylaws and a list of its initial membership to the Ministry of Government in order to receive recognition. The only requirement of the Guatemalan government is that each religious affiliation register as legal entities if they want to participate in business of any kind. Applicants are rejected if "the organization does not appear to be devoted to a religious objective, appears to be in pursuit of illegal activities, or engages in activities that appear likely to threaten the public order."

== Turmoil in Guatemala ==
=== Social Discrimination and Disputes ===
There have been several disputes between Catholics and the indigenous Mayan people. Many Catholic churches had been built on ancient Mayan sites during the Spanish colonization of the Americas which has upset the Mayan people not only because it is their land, but because several Catholic priests do not allow the Mayan people to access this land at all. Also, many Evangelical Protestants refuse to converse about any topics. Representatives from Catholic, Protestant, Muslim, and Mayan spirituality meets every two-three months out of the year at the Interreligious Dialogue at the Foro Guatemala to discuss several select topics such as social and political issues. Also, beginning in the 1960s, Catholic bishops and priests have joined to work with indigenous Mayan people to create a basis of local leadership, improve health and education, and also organize cooperatives.

=== Revolution and Disaster ===
During the 1960s, revolutionary upheaval began in Guatemala City. After the armed movement was put down by the Guatemalan Army, the movement came back stronger than before. It was now called the Guerrilla Army of the Poor, and began an insurgency campaign against the government: the Guatemalan military adopted scorched earth tactics and started killing hundreds of thousands of indigenous Mayan peasants in the western highlands. During the 1960s, the Catholic Church in Guatemala was suppressed by anti-communist Guatemalan governments, due to suspected Marxist sympathies. Lower Catholic orders were also targeted by the military, as they were seen as subversive and instrumental in the spread of liberation theology. Guatemala again experienced more destruction in 1976 when an earthquake took the lives of 20,000 people and injured 80,000 more.

== Organization of the Catholic Church in Guatemala ==
=== Dioceses ===
- Archdiocese of Guatemala
  - Diocese of Escuintla
  - Diocese of Santa Rosa de Lima
  - Diocese of Jalapa
  - Diocese of Verapaz, Cobán
  - Diocese of Zacapa y Santo Cristo de Esquipulas
- Archdiocese of Los Altos Quetzaltenango-Totonicapán
  - Diocese of Huehuetenango
  - Diocese of Quiché
  - Diocese of San Marcos
  - Diocese of Sololá-Chimaltenango
  - Diocese of Suchitepéquez-Retalhuleu

=== Apostolic Vicariates ===
- Apostolic Vicariate of Izabal
- Apostolic Vicariate of El Petén

== See also ==
- List of Central American and Caribbean saints
