= List of Catholic dioceses in North America =

The Roman and Eastern Catholic Churches in North America and Central America comprise 14 episcopal conferences, which together include 100 ecclesiastical provinces, each of which is headed by a metropolitan archbishop. The provinces are in turn subdivided into 85 archdioceses, 400 non-archdiocesan dioceses and 15 territorial prelatures, each of which is headed by a bishop or an archbishop (metropolitan if he has one or more suffragans). Some episcopal conferences include Military ordinariate (quasi dioceses), personal ordinariates and Eastern Catholic eparchies and/or exarchates that may not be part of an ecclesiastical province.

== List of Roman Catholic Dioceses ==
=== Episcopal Conference of the Antilles ===
==== Ecclesiastical province of Castries ====
- Metropolitan Archdiocese of Castries
  - Diocese of Kingstown
  - Diocese of Roseau
  - Diocese of Saint George's in Grenada
  - Diocese of Saint John's - Basseterre

==== Ecclesiastical province of Fort-de-France ====
- Metropolitan Archdiocese of Fort-de-France
  - Diocese of Basse-Terre

==== Ecclesiastical province of Kingston in Jamaica ====
- Metropolitan Archdiocese of Kingston in Jamaica
  - Diocese of Belize City-Belmopan
  - Diocese of Mandeville
  - Diocese of Montego Bay
  - Mission Sui Iuris of Cayman Islands

==== Ecclesiastical province of Nassau ====
- Metropolitan Archdiocese of Nassau
  - Diocese of Hamilton in Bermuda
  - Mission Sui Iuris of Turks and Caicos

==== Ecclesiastical province of Port of Spain ====
- Metropolitan Archdiocese of Port of Spain
  - Diocese of Bridgetown
  - Diocese of Willemstad

=== Episcopal Conference of Canada ===
==== Ecclesiastical province of Edmonton ====
- Metropolitan Archdiocese of Edmonton
  - Diocese of Calgary
  - Diocese of Saint Paul, Alberta

==== Ecclesiastical province of Gatineau ====
- Metropolitan Archdiocese of Gatineau
  - Diocese of Amos
  - Diocese of Mont-Laurier
  - Diocese of Rouyn-Noranda

==== Ecclesiastical province of Grouard-McLennan ====
- Metropolitan Archdiocese of Grouard-McLennan
  - Diocese of Mackenzie-Fort Smith

==== Ecclesiastical province of Halifax ====
- Metropolitan Archdiocese of Halifax–Yarmouth
  - Diocese of Antigonish
  - Diocese of Charlottetown

==== Ecclesiastical province of Keewatin-Le Pas ====
- Metropolitan Archdiocese of Keewatin-Le Pas
  - Diocese of Churchill-Baie d'Hudson

==== Ecclesiastical province of Kingston ====
- Metropolitan Archdiocese of Kingston
  - Diocese of Alexandria-Cornwall
  - Diocese of Peterborough
  - Diocese of Sault Sainte Marie

==== Ecclesiastical province of Moncton ====
- Metropolitan Archdiocese of Moncton
  - Diocese of Bathurst
  - Diocese of Edmundston
  - Diocese of Saint John, New Brunswick

==== Ecclesiastical province of Montréal ====
- Metropolitan Archdiocese of Montréal
  - Diocese of Joliette
  - Diocese of Saint-Jean-Longueuil
  - Diocese of Saint-Jérôme
  - Diocese of Valleyfield

==== Ecclesiastical province of Ottawa ====
- Metropolitan Archdiocese of Ottawa
  - Diocese of Hearst–Moosonee
  - Diocese of Pembroke
  - Diocese of Timmins

==== Ecclesiastical province of Québec ====
- Metropolitan Archdiocese of Québec
  - Diocese of Chicoutimi
  - Diocese of Sainte-Anne-de-la-Pocatière
  - Diocese of Trois Rivières

==== Ecclesiastical province of Regina ====
- Metropolitan Archdiocese of Regina
  - Diocese of Prince Albert
  - Diocese of Saskatoon

==== Ecclesiastical province of Rimouski ====
- Metropolitan Archdiocese of Rimouski
  - Diocese of Baie-Comeau
  - Diocese of Gaspé

==== Ecclesiastical province of Saint Boniface ====
- Archdiocese of Saint Boniface (no suffragan)

==== Ecclesiastical province of St. John's, Newfoundland ====
- Metropolitan Archdiocese of St. John's, Newfoundland
  - Diocese of Grand Falls
  - Diocese of Corner Brook and Labrador

==== Ecclesiastical province of Sherbrooke ====
- Metropolitan Archdiocese of Sherbrooke
  - Diocese of Nicolet
  - Diocese of Saint-Hyacinthe

==== Ecclesiastical province of Toronto ====
- Metropolitan Archdiocese of Toronto
  - Diocese of Hamilton
  - Diocese of London
  - Diocese of Saint Catharines
  - Diocese of Thunder Bay

==== Ecclesiastical province of Vancouver ====
- Metropolitan Archdiocese of Vancouver
  - Diocese of Kamloops
  - Diocese of Nelson
  - Diocese of Prince George
  - Diocese of Victoria

==== Ecclesiastical province of Winnipeg ====
- Archdiocese of Winnipeg (no suffragan)

=== Episcopal Conference of Costa Rica ===
==== Ecclesiastical province of San José de Costa Rica ====
- Metropolitan Archdiocese of San José de Costa Rica
  - Diocese of Alajuela
  - Diocese of Cartago
  - Diocese of Ciudad Quesada
  - Diocese of Limón
  - Diocese of Puntarenas
  - Diocese of San Isidro de El General
  - Diocese of Tilarán

=== Episcopal Conference of Cuba ===
==== Ecclesiastical province of San Cristobal de la Habana ====
- Metropolitan Archdiocese of San Cristobal de la Habana
  - Diocese of Matanzas
  - Diocese of Pinar del Rio

==== Ecclesiastical province of Santiago de Cuba ====
- Metropolitan Archdiocese of Santiago de Cuba
  - Diocese of Guantánamo-Baracoa
  - Diocese of Holguín
  - Diocese of Santisimo Salvador de Bayamo y Manzanillo

==== Ecclesiastical province of Camagüey ====
- Metropolitan Archdiocese of Camagüey
  - Diocese of Ciego de Avila
  - Diocese of Cienfuegos
  - Diocese of Santa Clara

=== Episcopal Conference of the Dominican Republic ===
==== Ecclesiastical province of Santo Domingo ====
- Metropolitan Archdiocese of Santo Domingo
  - Diocese of Baní
  - Diocese of Barahona
  - Diocese of Nuestra Señora de la Altagracia en Higüey
  - Diocese of San Juan de la Maguana
  - Diocese of San Pedro de Macorís

==== Ecclesiastical province of Santiago de los Caballeros ====
- Metropolitan Archdiocese of Santiago de los Caballeros
  - Diocese of La Vega
  - Diocese of Mao-Monte Cristi
  - Diocese of Puerto Plata
  - Diocese of San Francisco de Macorís

=== Episcopal Conference of El Salvador ===
==== Ecclesiastical province of San Salvador ====
- Metropolitan Archdiocese of San Salvador
  - Diocese of Chalatenango
  - Diocese of San Miguel
  - Diocese of San Vicente
  - Diocese of Santa Ana
  - Diocese of Santiago de María
  - Diocese of Sonsonate
  - Diocese of Zacatecoluca

=== Episcopal Conference of Guatemala ===
==== Ecclesiastical province of Guatemala ====
- Metropolitan Archdiocese of Guatemala
  - Diocese of Escuintla
  - Diocese of Santa Rosa de Lima
  - Diocese of Verapaz, Cobán
  - Diocese of Zacapa y Santo Cristo de Esquipulas

==== Ecclesiastical province of Los Altos Quetzaltenango-Totonicapán ====
- Metropolitan Archdiocese of Los Altos Quetzaltenango-Totonicapán
  - Diocese of Huehuetenango
  - Diocese of Quiché
  - Diocese of San Marcos
  - Diocese of Sololá-Chimaltenango
  - Diocese of Suchitepéquez-Retalhuleu

=== Episcopal Conference of Haiti ===
==== Ecclesiastical province of Cap-Haïtien ====
- Metropolitan Archdiocese of Cap-Haïtien
  - Diocese of Fort-Liberté
  - Diocese of Granada
  - Diocese of Hinche
  - Diocese of Les Gonaïves
  - Diocese of Port-de-Paix

==== Ecclesiastical province of Port-au-Prince ====
- Metropolitan Archdiocese of Port-au-Prince
  - Diocese of Jacmel
  - Diocese of Jérémie
  - Diocese of Les Cayes

=== Episcopal Conference of Honduras ===
==== Ecclesiastical province of Tegucigalpa ====
- Metropolitan Archdiocese of Tegucigalpa
  - Diocese of Choluteca
  - Diocese of Comayagua
  - Diocese of Juticalpa
  - Diocese of San Pedro Sula
  - Diocese of Santa Rosa de Copán
  - Diocese of Trujillo
  - Diocese of Yoro

=== Episcopal Conference of Mexico ===
==== Ecclesiastical province of Acapulco ====
- Metropolitan Archdiocese of Acapulco
  - Diocese of Chilpancingo-Chilapa
  - Diocese of Ciudad Altamirano
  - Diocese of Tlapa

==== Ecclesiastical province of Antequera, Oaxaca ====
- Metropolitan Archdiocese of Antequera, Oaxaca
  - Diocese of Puerto Escondido
  - Diocese of Tehuantepec
  - Diocese of Tuxtepec
  - Prelature of Huautla
  - Prelature of Mixes

==== Ecclesiastical province of Chihuahua ====
- Metropolitan Archdiocese of Chihuahua
  - Diocese of Ciudad Juárez
  - Diocese of Cuauhtémoc-Madera
  - Diocese of Nuevo Casas Grandes
  - Diocese of Parral
  - Diocese of Tarahumara

==== Ecclesiastical province of Durango ====
- Metropolitan Archdiocese of Durango
  - Diocese of Mazatlán
  - Diocese of Torreón
  - Prelature of El Salto

==== Ecclesiastical province of Guadalajara ====
- Metropolitan Archdiocese of Guadalajara
  - Diocese of Aguascalientes
  - Diocese of Autlán
  - Diocese of Ciudad Guzmán
  - Diocese of Colima
  - Diocese of San Juan de los Lagos
  - Diocese of Tepic
  - Prelature of Jesús María del Nayar

==== Ecclesiastical province of Hermosillo ====
- Metropolitan Archdiocese of Hermosillo
  - Diocese of Ciudad Obregón
  - Diocese of Culiacán
  - Diocese of Nogales

==== Ecclesiastical province of Jalapa ====
- Metropolitan Archdiocese of Jalapa
  - Diocese of Coatzacoalcos
  - Diocese of Córdoba
  - Diocese of Orizaba
  - Diocese of Papantla
  - Diocese of San Andrés Tuxtla
  - Diocese of Tuxpan
  - Diocese of Veracruz

==== Ecclesiastical province of León ====
- Metropolitan Archdiocese of León
  - Diocese of Celaya
  - Diocese of Irapuato
  - Diocese of Querétaro

==== Ecclesiastical province of México ====
- Metropolitan Archdiocese of Mexico
  - Diocese of Atlancomulco
  - Diocese of Cuernavaca
  - Diocese of Toluca

==== Ecclesiastical province of Monterrey ====
- Metropolitan Archdiocese of Monterrey
  - Diocese of Ciudad Victoria
  - Diocese of Linares
  - Diocese of Matamoros
  - Diocese of Nuevo Laredo
  - Diocese of Piedras Negras
  - Diocese of Saltillo
  - Diocese of Tampico

==== Ecclesiastical province of Morelia ====
- Metropolitan Archdiocese of Morelia
  - Diocese of Apatzingan
  - Diocese of Ciudad Lázaro Cárdenas
  - Diocese of Tacámbaro
  - Diocese of Zamora

==== Ecclesiastical province of Puebla de los Angeles ====
- Metropolitan Archdiocese of Puebla de los Angeles
  - Diocese of Huajuapan de León
  - Diocese of Tehuacán
  - Diocese of Tlaxcala

==== Ecclesiastical province of San Luis Potosí ====
- Metropolitan Archdiocese of San Luis Potosí
  - Diocese of Ciudad Valles
  - Diocese of Matehuala
  - Diocese of Zacatecas

==== Ecclesiastical province of Tijuana ====
- Metropolitan Archdiocese of Tijuana
  - Diocese of Ensenada
  - Diocese of La Paz en la Baja California Sur
  - Diocese of Mexicali

==== Ecclesiastical province of Tlalnepantla ====
- Metropolitan Archdiocese of Tlalnepantla
  - Diocese of Cuautitlán
  - Diocese of Ecatepec
  - Diocese of Netzahualcóyotl
  - Diocese of Texcoco
  - Diocese of Valle de Chalco

==== Ecclesiastical province of Tulancingo ====
- Metropolitan Archdiocese of Tulancingo
  - Diocese of Huejutla
  - Diocese of Tula

==== Ecclesiastical province of Tuxtla Gutiérrez ====
- Metropolitan Archdiocese of Tuxtla Gutiérrez
  - Diocese of San Cristóbal de Las Casas
  - Diocese of Tapachula

==== Ecclesiastical province of Yucatán ====
- Metropolitan Archdiocese of Yucatán
  - Diocese of Campeche
  - Diocese of Tabasco
  - Prelature of Cancún-Chetumal

=== Episcopal Conference of Nicaragua ===
==== Ecclesiastical province of Managua ====
- Metropolitan Archdiocese of Managua
  - Diocese of Esteli
  - Diocese of Granada
  - Diocese of Jinotega
  - Diocese of Juigalpa
  - Diocese of León en Nicaragua
  - Diocese of Matagalpa

=== Episcopal Conference of Panama ===
==== Ecclesiastical province of Panamá ====
- Metropolitan Archdiocese of Panamá
  - Diocese of Chitré
  - Diocese of Colón-Kuna Yala
  - Diocese of David
  - Diocese of Penonomé
  - Diocese of Santiago de Veraguas
  - Prelature of Bocas del Toro

=== Episcopal Conference of Puerto Rico (US Commonwealth) ===
==== Ecclesiastical province of San Juan de Puerto Rico ====
- Metropolitan Archdiocese of San Juan de Puerto Rico
  - Diocese of Arecibo
  - Diocese of Caguas
  - Diocese of Mayagüez
  - Diocese of Ponce

=== Episcopal Conference of the United States of America ===
==== Ecclesiastical province of Anchorage ====
- Metropolitan Archdiocese of Anchorage
  - Diocese of Fairbanks
  - Diocese of Juneau

==== Ecclesiastical province of Atlanta ====
- Metropolitan Archdiocese of Atlanta
  - Diocese of Charleston
  - Diocese of Charlotte
  - Diocese of Raleigh
  - Diocese of Savannah

==== Ecclesiastical province of Baltimore ====
- Metropolitan Archdiocese of Baltimore
  - Diocese of Arlington
  - Diocese of Richmond
  - Diocese of Wheeling-Charleston
  - Diocese of Wilmington

==== Ecclesiastical province of Boston ====
- Metropolitan Archdiocese of Boston
  - Diocese of Burlington
  - Diocese of Fall River
  - Diocese of Manchester
  - Diocese of Portland
  - Diocese of Springfield in Massachusetts
  - Diocese of Worcester

==== Ecclesiastical province of Chicago ====
- Metropolitan Archdiocese of Chicago
  - Diocese of Belleville
  - Diocese of Joliet
  - Diocese of Peoria
  - Diocese of Rockford
  - Diocese of Springfield in Illinois

==== Ecclesiastical province of Cincinnati ====
- Metropolitan Archdiocese of Cincinnati
  - Diocese of Cleveland
  - Diocese of Columbus
  - Diocese of Steubenville
  - Diocese of Toledo
  - Diocese of Youngstown

==== Ecclesiastical province of Denver ====
- Metropolitan Archdiocese of Denver
  - Diocese of Cheyenne
  - Diocese of Colorado Springs
  - Diocese of Pueblo

==== Ecclesiastical province of Detroit ====
- Metropolitan Archdiocese of Detroit
  - Diocese of Gaylord
  - Diocese of Grand Rapids
  - Diocese of Kalamazoo
  - Diocese of Lansing
  - Diocese of Marquette
  - Diocese of Saginaw

==== Ecclesiastical province of Dubuque ====
- Metropolitan Archdiocese of Dubuque
  - Diocese of Davenport
  - Diocese of Des Moines
  - Diocese of Sioux City

==== Ecclesiastical province of Galveston-Houston ====
- Metropolitan Archdiocese of Galveston-Houston
  - Diocese of Austin
  - Diocese of Beaumont
  - Diocese of Brownsville
  - Diocese of Corpus Christi
  - Diocese of Tyler
  - Diocese of Victoria in Texas

==== Ecclesiastical province of Hartford ====
- Metropolitan Archdiocese of Hartford
  - Diocese of Bridgeport
  - Diocese of Norwich
  - Diocese of Providence

==== Ecclesiastical province of Indianapolis ====
- Metropolitan Archdiocese of Indianapolis
  - Diocese of Evansville
  - Diocese of Fort Wayne-South Bend
  - Diocese of Gary
  - Diocese of Lafayette in Indiana

==== Ecclesiastical province of Kansas City ====
- Metropolitan Archdiocese of Kansas City in Kansas
  - Diocese of Dodge City
  - Diocese of Salina
  - Diocese of Wichita

==== Ecclesiastical province of Las Vegas ====
- Metropolitan Archdiocese of Las Vegas
  - Diocese of Reno
  - Diocese of Salt Lake City

==== Ecclesiastical province of Los Angeles ====
- Metropolitan Archdiocese of Los Angeles
  - Diocese of Fresno
  - Diocese of Monterey
  - Diocese of Orange
  - Diocese of San Bernardino
  - Diocese of San Diego

==== Ecclesiastical province of Louisville ====
- Metropolitan Archdiocese of Louisville
  - Diocese of Covington
  - Diocese of Knoxville
  - Diocese of Lexington
  - Diocese of Memphis
  - Diocese of Nashville
  - Diocese of Owensboro

==== Ecclesiastical province of Miami ====
- Metropolitan Archdiocese of Miami
  - Diocese of Orlando
  - Diocese of Palm Beach
  - Diocese of Pensacola-Tallahassee
  - Diocese of St. Augustine
  - Diocese of St. Petersburg
  - Diocese of Venice

==== Ecclesiastical province of Milwaukee ====
- Metropolitan Archdiocese of Milwaukee
  - Diocese of Green Bay
  - Diocese of La Crosse
  - Diocese of Madison
  - Diocese of Superior

==== Ecclesiastical province of Mobile ====
- Metropolitan Archdiocese of Mobile
  - Diocese of Biloxi
  - Diocese of Birmingham in Alabama
  - Diocese of Jackson

==== Ecclesiastical province of New Orleans ====
- Metropolitan Archdiocese of New Orleans
  - Diocese of Alexandria in Louisiana
  - Diocese of Baton Rouge
  - Diocese of Houma-Thibodaux
  - Diocese of Lafayette in Louisiana
  - Diocese of Lake Charles
  - Diocese of Shreveport

==== Ecclesiastical province of New York ====
- Metropolitan Archdiocese of New York
  - Diocese of Albany
  - Diocese of Brooklyn
  - Diocese of Buffalo
  - Diocese of Ogdensburg
  - Diocese of Rochester
  - Diocese of Rockville Centre
  - Diocese of Syracuse

==== Ecclesiastical province of Newark ====
- Metropolitan Archdiocese of Newark
  - Diocese of Camden
  - Diocese of Metuchen
  - Diocese of Paterson
  - Diocese of Trenton

==== Ecclesiastical province of Oklahoma City ====
- Metropolitan Archdiocese of Oklahoma City
  - Diocese of Little Rock
  - Diocese of Tulsa

==== Ecclesiastical province of Omaha ====
- Metropolitan Archdiocese of Omaha
  - Diocese of Grand Island
  - Diocese of Lincoln

==== Ecclesiastical province of Philadelphia ====
- Metropolitan Archdiocese of Philadelphia
  - Diocese of Allentown
  - Diocese of Altoona-Johnstown
  - Diocese of Erie
  - Diocese of Greensburg
  - Diocese of Harrisburg
  - Diocese of Pittsburgh
  - Diocese of Scranton

==== Ecclesiastical province of Portland ====
- Metropolitan Archdiocese of Portland
  - Diocese of Baker
  - Diocese of Boise
  - Diocese of Great Falls-Billings
  - Diocese of Helena

==== Ecclesiastical province of Saint Louis ====
- Metropolitan Archdiocese of Saint Louis
  - Diocese of Jefferson City
  - Diocese of Kansas City-Saint Joseph
  - Diocese of Springfield-Cape Girardeau

==== Ecclesiastical province of Saint Paul and Minneapolis ====
- Metropolitan Archdiocese of Saint Paul and Minneapolis
  - Diocese of Bismarck
  - Diocese of Crookston
  - Diocese of Duluth
  - Diocese of Fargo
  - Diocese of New Ulm
  - Diocese of Rapid City
  - Diocese of Saint Cloud
  - Diocese of Sioux Falls
  - Diocese of Winona

==== Ecclesiastical province of San Antonio ====
- Metropolitan Archdiocese of San Antonio
  - Diocese of Amarillo
  - Diocese of Dallas
  - Diocese of El Paso
  - Diocese of Fort Worth
  - Diocese of Laredo
  - Diocese of Lubbock
  - Diocese of San Angelo

==== Ecclesiastical province of San Francisco ====
- Metropolitan Archdiocese of San Francisco
  - Diocese of Honolulu
  - Diocese of Oakland
  - Diocese of Sacramento
  - Diocese of San Jose in California
  - Diocese of Santa Rosa in California
  - Diocese of Stockton

==== Ecclesiastical province of Santa Fe ====
- Metropolitan Archdiocese of Santa Fe
  - Diocese of Gallup
  - Diocese of Las Cruces
  - Diocese of Phoenix
  - Diocese of Tucson

==== Ecclesiastical province of Seattle ====
- Metropolitan Archdiocese of Seattle
  - Diocese of Spokane
  - Diocese of Yakima

==== Ecclesiastical province of Washington ====
- Metropolitan Archdiocese of Washington
  - Diocese of Saint Thomas

==== Archdiocese for the Military Services, USA ====
- Archdiocese for the Military Services, USA (not Metropolitan)

== Eastern Catholic dioceses in the United States and Canada ==
These partake in the US viz. Canadian ecclesiastical conference

=== Metropolia of Philadelphia for the Ukrainians ===
See: Category:Ukrainian Catholic Metropolia of Philadelphia

The Ukrainian Catholic Metropolitan Province of Philadelphia consists of four eparchies of the Ukrainian Greek Catholic Church, and covers the entire United States.

- Ukrainian Catholic Archeparchy of Philadelphia
  - Ukrainian Catholic Eparchy of Chicago
  - Ukrainian Catholic Eparchy of Saint Josaphat in Parma
  - Ukrainian Catholic Eparchy of Stamford

=== Metropolia of Pittsburgh for the Ruthenians ===
See: Category:Byzantine Catholic Metropolia of Pittsburgh

The Byzantine Catholic Metropolitan Province of Pittsburgh is a sui iuris metropolia, traditionally linked to the Ruthenian Greek Catholic Church. The metropolia consists of four eparchies of the Byzantine Rite Ruthenian Catholic Church and covers the entire United States, with jurisdiction for all Ruthenian Catholics in the United States, as well as other Byzantine Rite Catholics without an established hierarchy in the country.

- Byzantine Catholic Archeparchy of Pittsburgh
  - Byzantine Catholic Eparchy of Holy Protection of Mary of Phoenix
  - Byzantine Catholic Eparchy of Parma
  - Byzantine Catholic Eparchy of Passaic

=== Other Eastern Catholic dioceses ===
The other Eastern Catholic Churches with eparchies (dioceses) or exarchates established in the United States are not grouped into metropoliae. All are immediately subject to the Holy See, with limited oversight by the head of their respective sui iuris church.

==== Other Byzantine Rite Eastern churches ====
Melkite Greek Catholic Church
- Eparchy of Newton

Romanian Byzantine Catholic Church
- Eparchy of Saint George's in Canton (territory includes the U.S. and Canada)

==== Armenian Rite ====
Armenian Catholic Church
- Eparchy of Our Lady of Nareg of New York

==== Antiochian Rite Eastern churches ====
Maronite Catholic Church
- Eparchy of Our Lady of Lebanon of Los Angeles
- Eparchy of Saint Maron of Brooklyn

Syriac Catholic Church
- Eparchy of Our Lady of Deliverance of Newark (territory includes the U.S. and Canada)

Syro-Malankara Catholic Church
- Apostolic Exarchate of the United States of America

==== Syro-Oriental Rite churches ====
Chaldean Catholic Church
- Eparchy of Saint Peter the Apostle of San Diego
- Eparchy of Saint Thomas the Apostle of Detroit

Syro-Malabar Catholic Church
- Eparchy of Saint Thomas the Apostle of Chicago
- Eparchy of Mississauga

== Personal Ordinariate of the Chair of Saint Peter (Ordinariate Use) ==
- Personal Ordinariate of the Chair of Saint Peter

== See also ==
- List of Catholic dioceses (alphabetical)
- List of Catholic dioceses (structured view) § North America
