= Álvaro Leonel Ramazzini Imeri =

Guatemalan Catholic bishop (born 1947)

His Eminence Álvaro Leonel Ramazzini Imeri
- Bishop of Huehuetenango
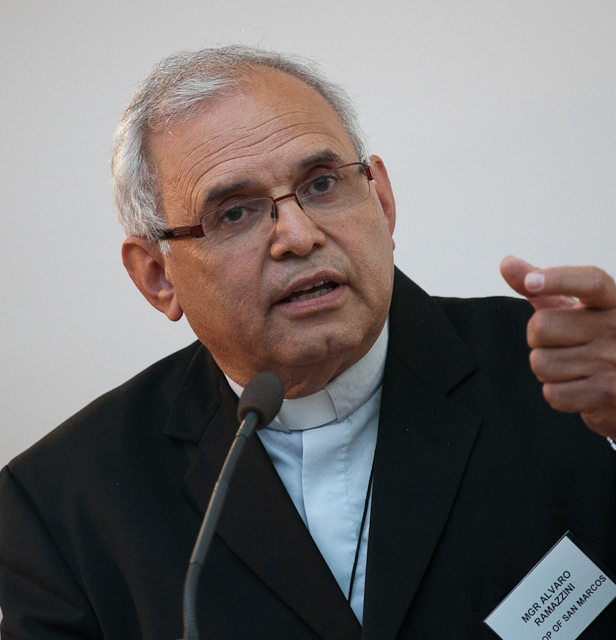
- Ramazzini in 2010
- Church: Catholic Church
- Diocese: Huehuetenango
- See: Huehuetenango
- Appointed: May 14, 2012
- Installed: July 14, 2012
- Predecessor: Rodolfo Francisco Bobadilla Mata
- Other post: Cardinal-Priest of San Giovanni Evangelista a Spinaceto (2019-)
- Previous post: Bishop of San Marcos (1988-2012)

Orders
- Ordination: June 27, 1971 by Mario Casariego y Acevedo
- Consecration: January 6, 1989 by Pope John Paul II
- Created cardinal: October 5, 2019 by Pope Francis
- Rank: Cardinal-Priest

Personal details
- Born: Álvaro Leonel Ramazzini Imeri; July 16, 1947 (age 79) Guatemala City, Guatemala
- Motto: Ay de mí si no evangelizo (Woe is me if I do not proclaim the Gospel), 1Cor 9:16

Styles of Álvaro Leonel Ramazzini Imeri
- Reference style: His Eminence
- Spoken style: Your Eminence
- Religious style: Monsignor
- Informal style: Cardinal

Álvaro Leonel Ramazzini Imeri (born July 16, 1947) is a Guatemalan prelate of the Catholic Church who has been the Bishop of Huehuetenango since 2012. He was the Bishop of San Marcos from 1988 to 2012. Pope Francis raised him to the rank of cardinal on 5 October 2019.

== Biography ==
Ramazzini was born in Guatemala City, and he was ordained to the presbyterate on June 27, 1971, for service to the Archdiocese of Guatemala. He earned a Doctor of Canon Law (J.C.D.) at the Pontifical Gregorian University at the Vatican in Rome. He was a Professor and Rector of the Major Seminary of Guatemala and Pastor of one of the largest parishes in the Archdiocese of Guatemala. On December 15, 1988, Pope John Paul II appointed then-Father Ramazzini as the Bishop of San Marcos. He was consecrated by the Pope on January 6, 1989. The principal co-consecrators were Archbishops Edward Idris Cassidy and José Tomás Sánchez.

As a priest and bishop Ramazzini has been involved in social justice issues, especially in the area of protecting the rights of indigenous people. He has fought against multinational corporations who come to Guatemala for its mineral wealth while destroying the countryside. Bishop Ramazzini has empowered the poor and marginalized and fostered civil courage to fight against the injustice they experience. He has received many death threats because of his work, and has received official letters of support from the Holy See and the United States Conference of Catholic Bishops.

In 2005, Ramazzini received the Konrad Lorenz Award. The same year he testified before the International Relations Sub-committee on the Western Hemisphere of the United States House of Representatives. He was elected as the President of the Episcopal Conference of Guatemala in 2006. In 2011, he received the Pacem in Terris Peace and Freedom Award, in honor of his social justice work.

Ramazzini has held many positions in the Episcopal Conference of Guatemala and as of 2013 chaired the Commission for Social Communications and the Commission for Prison Ministry. Ramazzini participated in the CELAM Assembly in Aparecida, Brazil, in 2007, and before that, at the Special Assembly for America of the Synod of Bishops in 1997. On 14 May 2012, Pope Benedict XVI named Ramazzini Bishop of Huehuetenango as he accepted the resignation offered by Bishop Rodolfo Francisco Bobadilla Mata, C.M.

On 5 October 2019, Pope Francis made him Cardinal Priest of San Giovanni Evangelista a Spinaceto. He was made a member of the Dicastery for the Laity, Family and Life on 21 February 2020 and of the Pontifical Commission for Latin America on 20 April 2020. He participated as a cardinal elector in the 2025 papal conclave that elected Pope Leo XIV.

== See also ==
- Cardinals created by Francis

Catholic Church titles
Preceded by Julio Amílcar Bethancourt Fioravanti	Bishop of San Marcos; 15 December 1988 – 14 May 2012	Succeeded by Carlos Enrique Trinidad Gómez
Preceded by Rodolfo Ignacio Quezada Toruño	President of the Guatemalan Episcopal Conference; 27 January 2006 – 28 January 2008	Succeeded by Pablo Vizcaíno Prado
Preceded by Rodolfo Francisco Bobadilla Mata	Bishop of Huehuetenango; 14 May 2012 –	Incumbent
Preceded by Miguel Obando y Bravo	Cardinal-Priest of San Giovanni Evangelista a Spinaceto; 5 October 2019 –	Incumbent
