= Hugo Mark Gerbermann =

His Excellency, The Most Reverend Hugo M. Gerbermann, M.M.
- Auxiliary Bishop of San Antonio
- Church: Catholic Church
- See: Titular See of Pinhel
- Appointed: July 22, 1975
- Term ended: June 30, 1982
- Previous post: Bishop of Huehuetenango (1967-1975)

Orders
- Ordination: February 7, 1943 by James Edward Walsh
- Consecration: July 22, 1962 by Ambrogio Marchioni

Personal details
- Born: September 11, 1913 Nada, Texas, US
- Died: October 19, 1996 (aged 83) Hillje, Texas, US
- Motto: Pro ovibus suis (For his sheep)

Hugo Mark Gerbermann, M.M. (September 11, 1913 – October 19, 1996) was an American prelate of the Roman Catholic Church in the United States. He served as an auxiliary bishop of the Archdiocese of San Antonio in Texas from 1975 to 1982.

Gerbermann previously served as the first bishop of the Diocese of Huehuetenango in Guatemala from 1967 to 1975. Before that, he was prelate of the Territorial Prelature of Huehuetenango and a missionary in Ecuador and Guatemala.

== Early life and education ==
Hugo Gerbermann was born in Nada, Texas, to John J. and Matilda H. Gerbermann, one of eight children. He attended the Nadia Public Schools. Deciding to become a priest, he spent the next seven years studying at St. John's Seminary in San Antonio. Gerbermann entered the Maryknoll Society in 1939 and began studying the Maryknoll Novitiate House of Studies in Bedford, Massachusetts.

== Priesthood ==
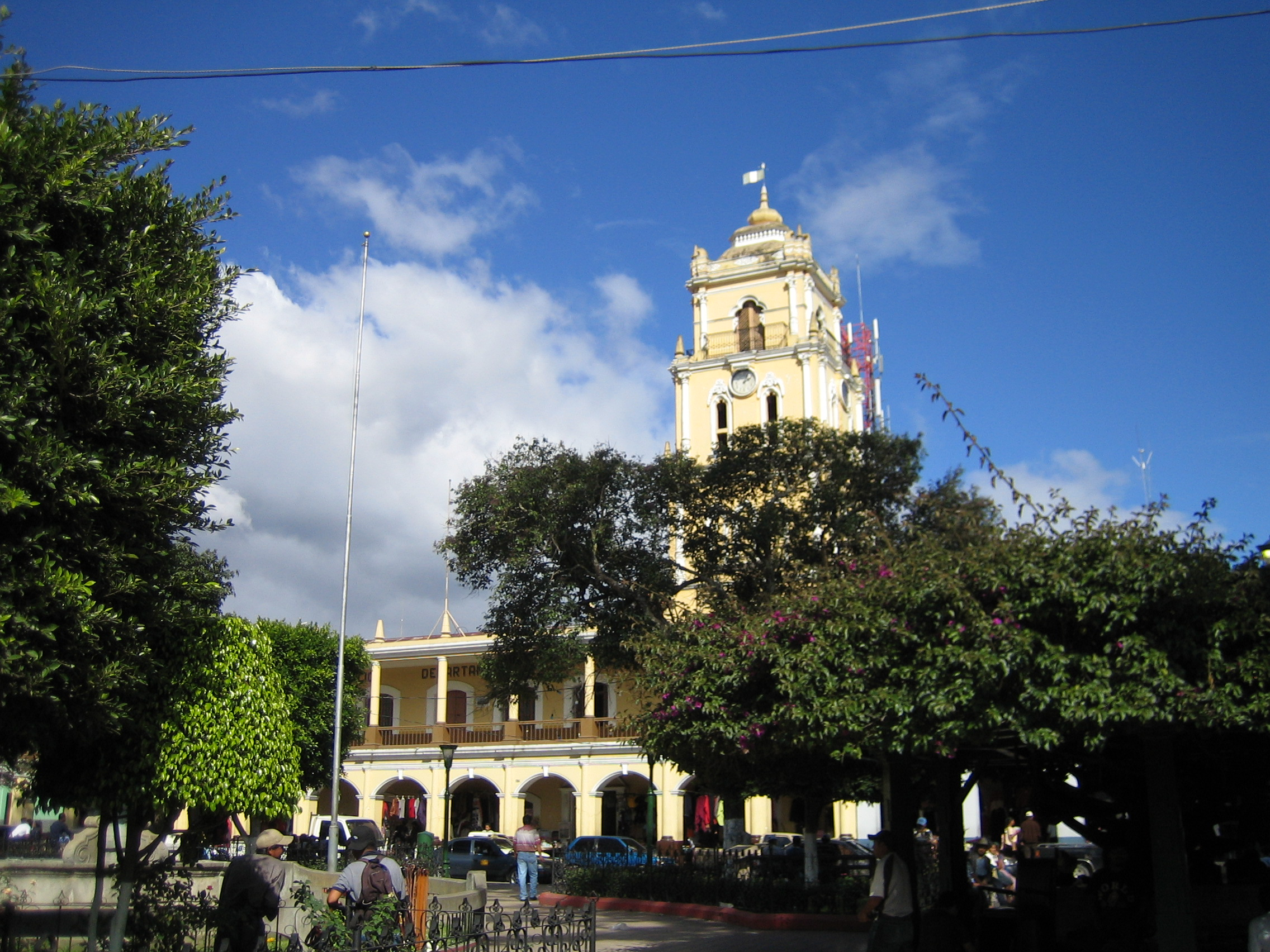
Huehuetenango, Guatemala (2006)

Gerbermann was ordained a priest for the Maryknoll Society at their center in New York on February 7, 1943 by Bishop James Edward Walsh. After his ordination, the Maryknoll Society sent him to the Maryknoll Mission in Guayaquil, Ecuador . He was assigned as a pastor at a parish in Quevado for three years, then one in Vinces for two years. In 1948, the Maryknoll Society left Ecuador.

Gerbermann's next assignment was in the Maryknoll Mission in Guatemala. He served as pastor of a parish in San Pedro Soloma for three years and then became pastor of the parish in San Ildefonso Ixtahuacán. Gerbermann was eventually named as first consultor to the Maryknoll group superior in Guatemala. Then in 1956, he became regional superior. Pope John XXIII in 1961 raised the Huehuetenango Mission to a prelature nullius and named Gerbermann as its prelate.

== Bishop of Huehuetenango ==
Pope Paul VI named Gerbermann as titular bishop of Amathus in Palaestina and bishop of the new Diocese of Huehuetenango, on June 6, 1962. He was consecrated at the Cathedral of Guatemala City by Archbishop Ambrogio Marchioni, the Apostolic Nuncio to El Salvador and Guatemala, on July 22, 1962. His principal co-consecrators were Archbishop Mariano Rossell y Arellano, the Prelate of Esquipulas, and Bishop Celestino Miguel Fernández Pérez of San Marcos.

Gerbermann attended three of the four sessions of the Second Vatican Council in Rome from 1962 to 1965. His health started to decline and an auxiliary bishop was assigned to Huehuetenango to assist Gerbermann in his ministry.

== Auxiliary Bishop of San Antonio ==
On July 22, 1975, Paul VI named Gerberman as titular bishop of Pinhel and auxiliary bishop of San Antonio. Gerberman lived at St. Agnes Parish in Edna, Texas, and served as vicar general of the archdiocese.

== Retirement and death ==
Gerberman served the archdiocese as an auxiliary bishop until Pope John Paul II accepted his resignation on June 30, 1982.

In his retirement, Gerberman resided at St. Mary's Parish in his native Nada and assisted local priests with their pastoral responsibilities. He later moved into the Czech Catholic Home in Hillje, Texas, where he died on October 19, 1996, at age 83. His funeral was held at The Church of the Nativity of the Blessed Virgin Mary and he was laid to rest at St. Mary's Cemetery in Nada.

== See also ==
Archdiocese of San Antonio

Catholic Church titles
Preceded by –	Auxiliary Bishop of San Antonio; 1975–1982	Succeeded by –
Preceded by None	Bishop of Huehuetenango; 1967-1975	Succeeded by Victor Hugo Martínez Contreras
