= Diocese of Jalapa (Guatemala) =

Roman Catholic diocese in Guatemala

Coordinates: 14.6351°N 89.9803°W

Diocese of Jalapa in Guatemala Dioecesis Ialapensis in Guatimala
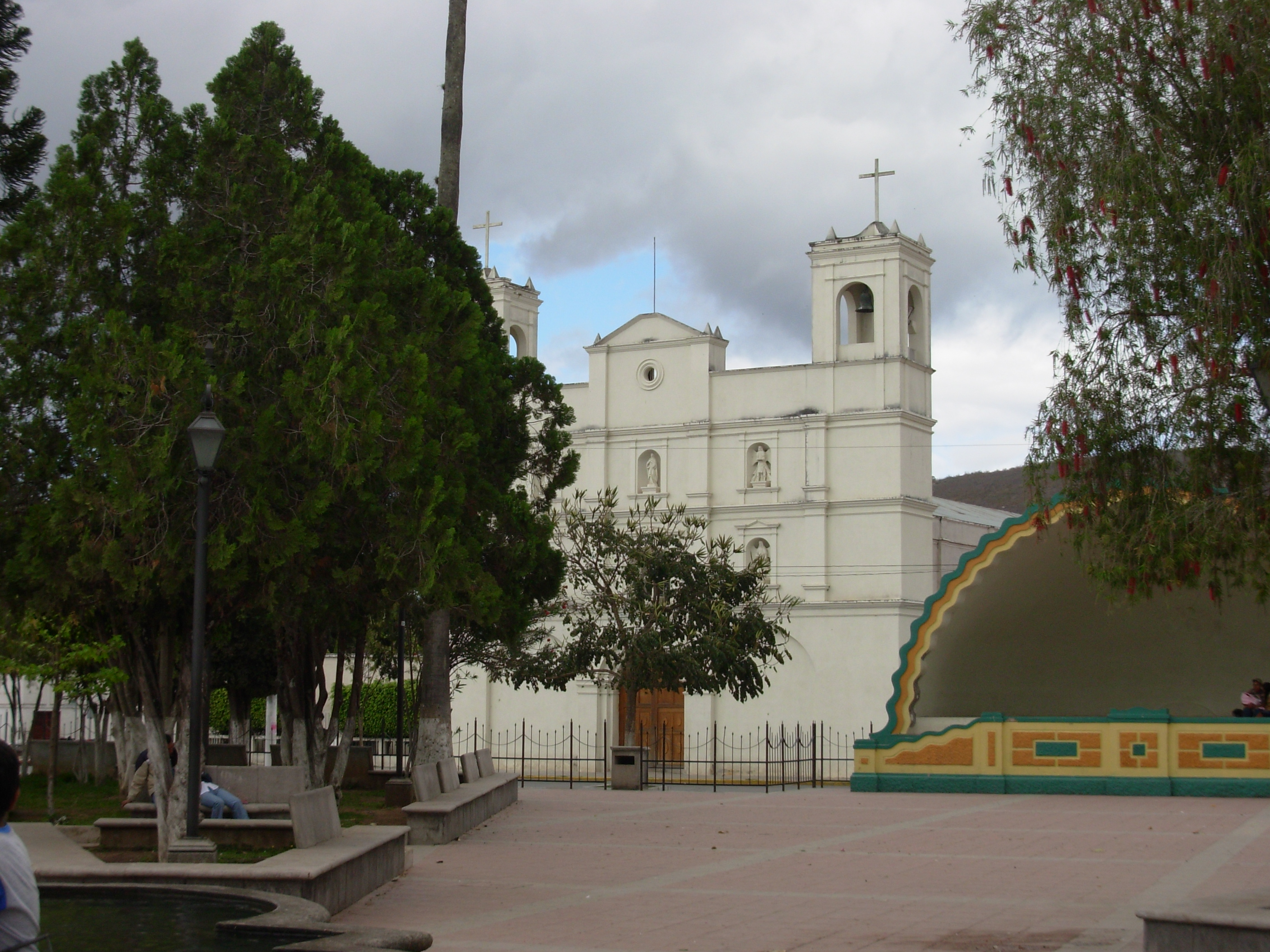
- Nuestra Señora de la Expectación cathedral

Location
- Country: Guatemala
- Ecclesiastical province: Province of Guatemala City

Statistics
- Area: 7,204 km^{2} (2,781 sq mi)
- Population: Total; Catholics: (as of 2010); 827,958; 678,926 (82%)
- Parishes: 33

Information
- Denomination: Catholic Church
- Sui iuris church: Latin Church
- Rite: Roman Rite
- Established: 10 March 1951 (74 years ago)
- Cathedral: Cathedral of Our Lady of Hope
- Patron saint: Santa Cruz

Current leadership
- Pope: Leo XIV
- Bishop: José Benedicto Moscoso Miranda
- Bishops emeritus: Julio Edgar Cabrera Ovalle

Map
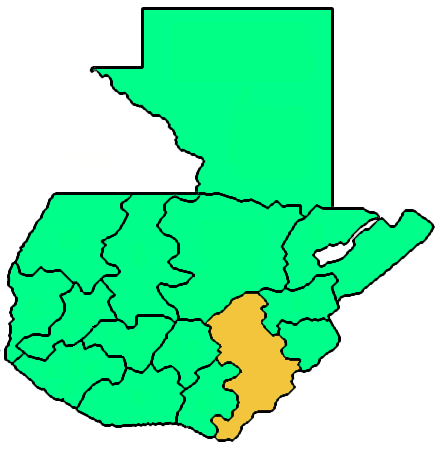

The Diocese of Jalapa is a Latin Church ecclesiastical territory or diocese of the Catholic Church in southeastern Guatemala. It is a suffragan diocese in the ecclesiastical province of the metropolitan Archdiocese of Santiago de Guatemala.

Its Marian cathedral is Catedral Nuestra Señora de la Expectación in the episcopal see of Jalapa. The diocesan patron is Santa Cruz (the Holy Cross).

== History ==
It was erected on 10 March 1951, on territory split off from the Archdiocese of Guatemala, which remains its metropolitan.

On 25 January 2016 it lost territory to erect the Diocese of San Francisco de Asís de Jutiapa as fellow suffragan of the Archdiocese of Guatemala.

== Bishops ==
- Miguel Angel García y Aráuz (1951.04.11 – retired 1987.01.29), previously Titular Bishop of Sophene (1944.05.16 – 1951.04.11) & Auxiliary Bishop of Archdiocese of Guatemala (Guatemala) (1944.05.16 – 1951.04.11); also Apostolic Administrator of Zacapa (Guatemala) (1951 – 1955.11.30)
- Jorge Mario Avila del Aguila, Lazarists (C.M.) (1987.01.29 – retired 2001.12.05), previously Apostolic Administrator of El Petén (Guatemala) (1978.02.03 – 1984.02.03), Titular Bishop of Nasai (1982.12.03 – 1987.01.29), Apostolic Vicar of El Petén (Guatemala) (1984.02.03 – 1987.01.29)
- Julio Edgar Cabrera Ovalle (5 December 2001 – 30 March 2020), previously Bishop of Quiché (Guatemala) (1986.10.31 – 2001.12.05)
- José Benedicto Moscoso Miranda (30 March 2020 – present)

Other priests of this diocese who became bishops

- Gabriel Peñate Rodríguez, appointed Vicar Apostolic of Izabal in 2004
- Ángel Antonio Recinos Lemus. appointed Bishop of Zacapa y Santo Cristo de Esquipulas in 2016
