= Gerardo Humberto Flores Reyes =

Guatemalan Roman Catholic prelate (1925–2022)

- Bishop of Verapaz
- Church: Catholic Church
- Diocese: Diocese of Verapaz
- In office: 7 October 1977 – 22 February 2001
- Predecessor: Juan José Gerardi Conedera
- Successor: Rodolfo Valenzuela Núñez
- Previous posts: Apostolic Administrator of Izabal (1969-1977); Titular Bishop of Nova Caesaris (1966-1977); Auxiliary Bishop of Quetzaltenango, Los Altos (1966-1969)

Orders
- Ordination: 17 December 1949 by Jorge García Caballeros
- Consecration: 7 October 1966 by Luis Manresa Formosa

Personal details
- Born: 9 December 1925 Quetzaltenango, Quetzaltenango Department, Guatemala
- Died: 17 February 2022 (aged 96) Cobán, Alta Verapaz, Guatemala

Geraldo Humberto Flores Reyes (9 December 1925 – 17 February 2022) was a Guatemalan Roman Catholic prelate.

Flores Reyes was born in Guatemala, and was ordained to the priesthood in 1949. He served as titular bishop of Nova Caesaris and as auxiliary bishop of the Roman Catholic Archdiocese of Los Altos Quetzaltenango-Totonicapán, Guatemala, from 1966 to 1969, apostolic administrator of the Apostolic Vicariate of Izabal, Guatemala, from 1969 to 1977, and as bishop of the Roman Catholic Diocese of Verapaz, Guatemala, from 1971 to 2001, when he retired. Flores Reyes died on 17 February 2022, at the age of 96.
