= Province of Montreal =

Province of Montreal may refer to:

- The Roman Catholic ecclesiastical province of Montreal, see List of Roman Catholic dioceses in North America
- The Proposal for the Province of Montreal
- a misnomer from the 19th century for the province of Quebec
- a misnomer for the district of Montreal in the colony of Canada during the French colonial period
