= Luis María Estrada Paetau =

Luis María Estrada Paetau O.P.
- Apostolic Vicar of Izabal
- Church: Catholic Church
- See: Apostolic Vicariate of Izabal
- In office: 27 October 1977 – 12 June 2004
- Predecessor: Gerardo Humberto Flores Reyes
- Successor: Gabriel Peñate Rodríguez
- Other post: Titular Bishop of Regiae (1977-2011)
- Previous post: Apostolic Administrator of El Petén (1970-1977)

Orders
- Ordination: 26 March 1961
- Consecration: 12 December 1977 by Emanuele Gerada

Personal details
- Born: 26 May 1935 Guatemala City, Guatemala
- Died: 25 March 2011 (aged 75)

Luis María Estrada Paetau (26 May 1935 – 25 March 2011) was the Roman Catholic bishop of the Roman Catholic Vicariate Apostolic of Izabal, Guatemala.

Born in Guatemala, Estrada Paetau was ordained a priest in 1961 in Salamanca (Spain) at the end of the studies of Theologie in the Faculty of San Esteban. In 1977, he was named a bishop of the Izabal Vicariate Apostolic in 1988. He resigned in 2004.
