= Pablo Vizcaíno Prado =

Guatemalan bishop (born 1951)

- Bishop of Suchitepéquez-Retalhuleu
- Church: Catholic Church
- Diocese: Diocese of Suchitepéquez-Retalhuleu
- Appointed: 31 December 1996
- Predecessor: Diocese established

Orders
- Ordination: 19 March 1980 by Rodolfo Quezada Toruño
- Consecration: 8 March 1997 by Victor Hugo Martínez Contreras

Personal details
- Born: 22 June 1951 (age 74) Guatemala City, Guatemala

Pablo Vizcaíno Prado (born June 22, 1951 in Guatemala City) is a Guatemalan bishop, serving as bishop of the Roman Catholic Diocese of Suchitepéquez-Retalhuleu since 1997.
