= Holy Spirit Cathedral =

Holy Spirit Cathedral or Cathedral of the Holy Spirit may refer to:

- Cathedral of the Holy Spirit, Istanbul, Istanbul, Turkey
- Cathedral of the Descent of the Holy Spirit, Lugoj, Lugoj, Romania
- Cathedral of the Holy Spirit (Bismarck, North Dakota), United States
- Cathedral of the Holy Spirit, Hradec Králové, Czech Republic
- Cathedral of the Holy Spirit, Palmerston North, New Zealand
- Guildford Cathedral, England; "Cathedral Church of the Holy Spirit"
- Holy Spirit Cathedral (Accra), Ghana
- Holy Spirit Cathedral (Minsk), Belarus
- Holy Spirit Cathedral, Denpasar, Bali
- Holy Spirit Cathedral, Divinópolis, Brazil
- Holy Spirit Cathedral, Gbarnga, Liberia
- Holy Spirit Cathedral, Jataí, Brazil
- Holy Spirit Cathedral, Kpalimé, Togo
- Holy Spirit Cathedral, Penang, Malaysia
- Holy Spirit Cathedral, Quetzaltenango, Guatemala

== See also ==
- Church of the Holy Spirit (disambiguation)
