= Óscar Julio Vian Morales =

Guatemalan Catholic archbishop

His Excellency Óscar Julio Vian Morales, S.D.B.
- Archbishop of Guatemala City
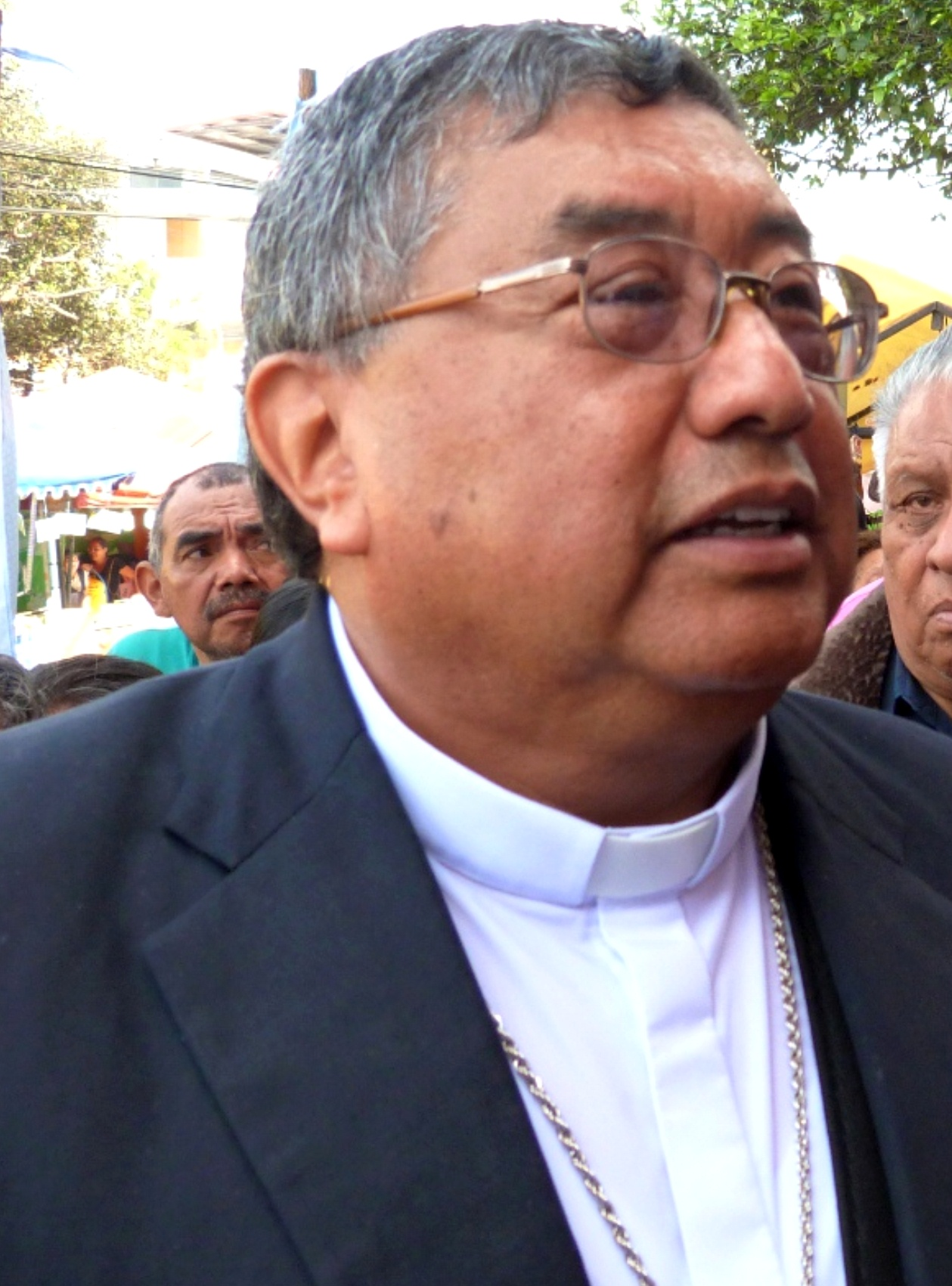
- Morales in January 2013.
- Church: Roman Catholic Church
- Archdiocese: Archbishop of Guatemala City
- Province: Guatemala
- Metropolis: Guatemala
- Installed: 4 December 2010
- Term ended: 24 February 2018
- Predecessor: Rodolfo Quezada Toruño
- Successor: Gonzalo de Villa y Vásquez, S.J.
- Other post: Archbishop of Los Altos

Orders
- Ordination: 15 August 1976 by Miguel Obando y Bravo
- Consecration: 1 February 1997 by Miguel Obando y Bravo
- Rank: Archbishop

Personal details
- Born: Óscar Julio Vian Morales; 18 October 1947 Guatemala City, Guatemala
- Died: 24 February 2018 (aged 70) Guatemala City, Guatemala
- Coat of arms

Óscar Julio Vian Morales S.D.B. (18 October 1947 – 24 February 2018) was archbishop of the Roman Catholic Archdiocese of Guatemala from his appointment by Pope Benedict XVI on 2 October 2010 until his death from cancer. He had previously served as archbishop of Los Altos in Guatemala. He was born in Guatemala City, ordained a priest in 1976, and appointed Vicar Apostolic of El Petén in 1996. He was installed as Archbishop of Los Altos on 17 April 2007.

== Biography ==
After his secondary education at the Colegio Don Bosco in Guatemala and the Salesian Seminary in El Salvador, he studied philosophy, theology and pedagogy at the Salesian Institute of Theology and Philosophy, and the San Carlos University of Guatemala.

On 25 August 1976 he was ordained priest by Cardinal Miguel Obando y Bravo, S.D.B., the Archbishop of Managua, Nicaragua. He taught at various Salesian education centers in Central America, including the Salesian Vocational Center Rinaldi Santa Tecla (El Salvador), Dominic Savio College of Cartago (Costa Rica) and the Don Bosco Technical Institute (Panama). Also, he was director of the Instituto Salesiano San Miguel in Tegucigalpa, Honduras.

Fr. Vian Morales received sabbatical leave to study liturgical theology at the Pontifical Liturgical Institute of Sant'Anselmo in Rome. On his return to Central America he was appointed spiritual adviser and director of the Salesian Institute and the Salesian Youth Centre (CEJUSA). Shortly afterwards he was appointed director of studies at the Salesian Don Bosco School in Guatemala City and four years later director of the Salesian San Miguel Institute in Tegucigalpa, Honduras. In December 1990 he was appointed director of the Don Bosco Youth Center in Managua, Nicaragua, and in 1994 took over as director of the Don Bosco School of Guatemala City. He also taught liturgical theology and catechesis in numerous seminars throughout Central America.

For the Salesian province he acted as councillor of the Salesian Inspectorate for Central America (CAM) and delegate for youth ministry in the province's center located in San Salvador. In 1990 he was elected delegate of the Salesian Province to the General Chapter in Rome.

Pope John Paul II named him Vicar Apostolic of El Petén on 20 December 1996. He was consecrated bishop by Cardinal Obando y Bravo on 1 February 1997 in the city of Flores, El Petén.

Between 1997 and 2006, he also held various positions within the Episcopal Conference of Guatemala, was chairman of its liturgy ministry committee, and participated in its committees on land ministry, Caritas-social ministry, youth ministry, and education ministry. In addition, he chaired the Education Ministry Commission of Central America and Panama (CORECA).

He was appointed Archbishop of Los Altos Quetzaltenango-Totonicapán in 2007. Transferred to the post of Archbishop of Guatemala on 2 October 2010, he took possession of the see on 4 December 2010.

== Death ==
He died due to cancer in a Guatemala City hospital on 24 February 2018. Acting President Jafeth Cabrera Franco decreed three days of national mourning, and the national flag should fly at half mast in all public plazas and government buildings.

Catholic Church titles
| Preceded by Victor Hugo Martínez Contreras | Archbishop of Los Altos | Succeeded by Mario Alberto Molina Palma years=19 April 2007 – 2 October 2010 |
| Preceded by Rodolfo Cardinal Quezada Toruño | Archbishop of Guatemala City; 2 October 2010–24 February 2018 | Succeeded by Gonzalo de Villa y Vásquez, S.J. |
