= Juan José Gerardi Conedera =

Murdered Roman Catholic bishop

His Excellency, The Most Reverend Juan José Gerardi Conedera
- Auxiliary Bishop of Santiago de Guatemala
- See: Archdiocese of Santiago de Guatemala
- Appointed: 14 August 1984
- Term ended: 26 April 1998
- Previous posts: Bishop of Quiché (1974-1984); Bishop of Verapaz (1967-1974)

Orders
- Ordination: 21 December 1946
- Consecration: 30 July 1967 by Bruno Torpigliani

Personal details
- Born: 27 December 1922 Guatemala City, Guatemala
- Died: 26 April 1998 (aged 75) San Sebastian Church, Guatemala
- Denomination: Catholic

Juan José Gerardi Conedera (27 December 1922 – 26 April 1998) was a Guatemalan Catholic prelate and human rights defender who was long active in working with the indigenous Maya peoples of the country. He served as an Auxiliary Bishop of Santiago de Guatemala from 1984 to 1998, and was previously Bishop of Verapaz from 1967 to 1974 and Bishop of Quiché from 1974 to 1984.

In the 1970s, he gained government recognition of indigenous languages as official languages, and helped secure permission for radio stations to broadcast in indigenous languages. In 1988 he was appointed to the government's National Reconciliation Commission to begin the process of accounting for abuses during the civil war. He also worked on the associated Recovery of Historical Memory Project, which was sponsored by the Catholic Church.

Two days after he announced the release of the project's report on victims of the Guatemalan Civil War, Guatemala: Nunca Más!, in April 1998, Gerardi was attacked in his garage and beaten to death. In 2001, in the first-ever trial in a civilian court of members of the military in Guatemalan, three army officers were convicted of his death and sentenced to long prison terms. A priest was convicted as an accomplice and also sentenced.

Gerardi was declared a martyr by Pope Francis in 2020, clearing the way for his beatification.

== Early life ==
Gerardi Conedera, of partial Italian ancestry, was born in Guatemala City on 27 December 1922. He studied at the city's seminary and won a scholarship to study theology in New Orleans, United States. On 21 December 1946, he was ordained a priest and served in several rural areas of Guatemala such as Mataquescuintla, San Pedro Sacatepéquez and Palencia, as well as in the capital city.

== Bishop ==
On 9 May 1967, he was elected Bishop of Verapaz, assuming office the following 11 August. In this position, he emphasised pastoral work among indigenous communities of Mayan peoples. During the country's on-going civil war in the 1970s, Gerardi was a strong proponent for the official recognition of Guatemala's indigenous languages, to improve the status of the indigenous peoples. He was instrumental in securing authorisation for two radio stations to broadcast in Mayan languages.

In 1974, he was appointed Bishop of Quiché, but continued working as an Apostolic Administrator in Verapaz. Between 1980 and 1983, El Quiché saw increased levels of violence in the conflict between the Army and various rebel guerrilla factions. Hundreds of Roman Catholic catechists and heads of Christian communities, most of whom were of Maya origin, were brutally murdered. Gerardi repeatedly asked the military authorities to control their actions.

While serving as president of the Guatemalan Conference of Bishops, Gerardi spoke out openly about the Spanish embassy fire of 31 January 1980, in which 39 people lost their lives. Guatemalan government forces were suspected of having sparked the fire. That same year he was called to the Vatican to attend a synod. Upon returning to Guatemala, he was denied entry to the country because of his public criticism. He travelled to neighbouring El Salvador, which refused to grant him right of asylum. Gerardi settled temporarily in Costa Rica, where he remained until military president Romeo Lucas García was overthrown in 1982. The change in government allowed Gerardi to return to his dioceses in Guatemala. On 28 August 1984, he was appointed auxiliary bishop of the Archdiocese of Guatemala.

== National Reconciliation Commission ==
In 1988 the Conference of Bishops assigned Gerardi and Rodolfo Quezada Toruño to serve on the National Reconciliation Commission established by the government. This later led to the creation of the Office of Human Rights of the Archbishopric (Oficina de Derechos Humanos del Arzobispado; ODHA). It continues to provide assistance to victims of human rights violations.

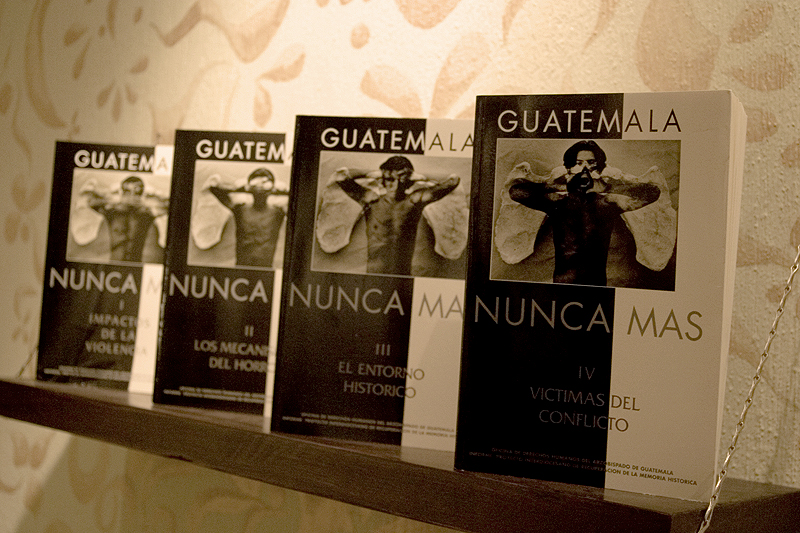
Guatemala: Nunca más, the REMHI Report.

Work began on the Recovery of Historical Memory (REMHI) project, to collect the facts and history of Guatemala's long civil war and confront the truth of those years. On 24 April 1998, REMHI presented the results of its work in the report Guatemala: Nunca más. This report summarized testimony and statements of thousands of witnesses and victims of repression during the Civil War. "The report laid the blame for 80 per cent of the atrocities at the door of the Guatemalan Army and its collaborators within the social and political elite."

The task of historical recovery that Gerardi and his team pursued was fundamental in the subsequent work of the UN-sponsored Historical Clarification Commission (CEH). This was set up within the framework of the 1996 peace process, to bring out the facts about the period of the long government repression. Some critics accused the Vatican, the REMHI and Gerardi of furthering Marxist propaganda because the REMHI blames the National Army for the vast majority of deaths during the civil war. The UN Truth Commission Report, released in February 1999, came to similar conclusions as the REMHI report.

== Assassination ==
On 26 April 1998, two days after the publication of Guatemala: Nunca más, Bishop Gerardi was attacked and bludgeoned to death in the garage of the parish house of San Sebastian Church, where he was the pastor. His assailants used a concrete slab as the murder weapon. The bishop was so damaged in the brutal attack that his face was unrecognisable and identification of the corpse was made by means of his episcopal ring.

=== Aftermath ===
On 8 June 2001, three army officers: Colonel Byron Disrael Lima Estrada and Captain Byron Miguel Lima Oliva (who were father and son), and Sergeant José Obdulio Villanueva (a non-commissioned officer rank), were convicted of Gerardi's murder and sentenced to 30-year prison terms. The priest Mario Leonel Orantes Nájera, whom the court had identified as an accomplice, was sentenced to 20 years. The case was precedent-setting in that it was the first time that members of the military had been tried in a civilian court. The defendants appealed, and in March 2005 an appeals court lowered the Limas' sentences to 20 years each. Orantes' sentence was left unchanged. Villanueva had been killed in a prison riot in 2003 before the appeal verdict was reached. The Constitutional Court in April 2007 upheld the new sentences. Lima Estrada, the father, had been trained at the School of the Americas. He was later granted parole in 2012. Lima Oliva, the son, was shot dead in jail in July 2016. Lima Oliva had been denied parole on two different occasions and was attempting to take control of Pavon prison when he was shot dead along with several other prisoners. He was believed to have been a longtime leader of an organized crime cell which was centered from within Pavon prison.

== Legacy ==
Gerardi was declared a martyr by Pope Francis in 2020, clearing the way for his eventual beatification in the Catholic Church.

== In popular culture ==
The book The Art of Political Murder: Who Killed the Bishop?, written by Francisco Goldman, was published in 2007. In 2020, the documentary film The Art of Political Murder, directed by Paul Taylor and based on Goldman's book, was distributed by HBO Documentary Films.

== See also ==
- Guatemalan Civil War
- The Art of Political Murder
