= Holy Spirit Cathedral, Jataí =

Holy Spirit Cathedral
- Catedral Divino Espírito Santo
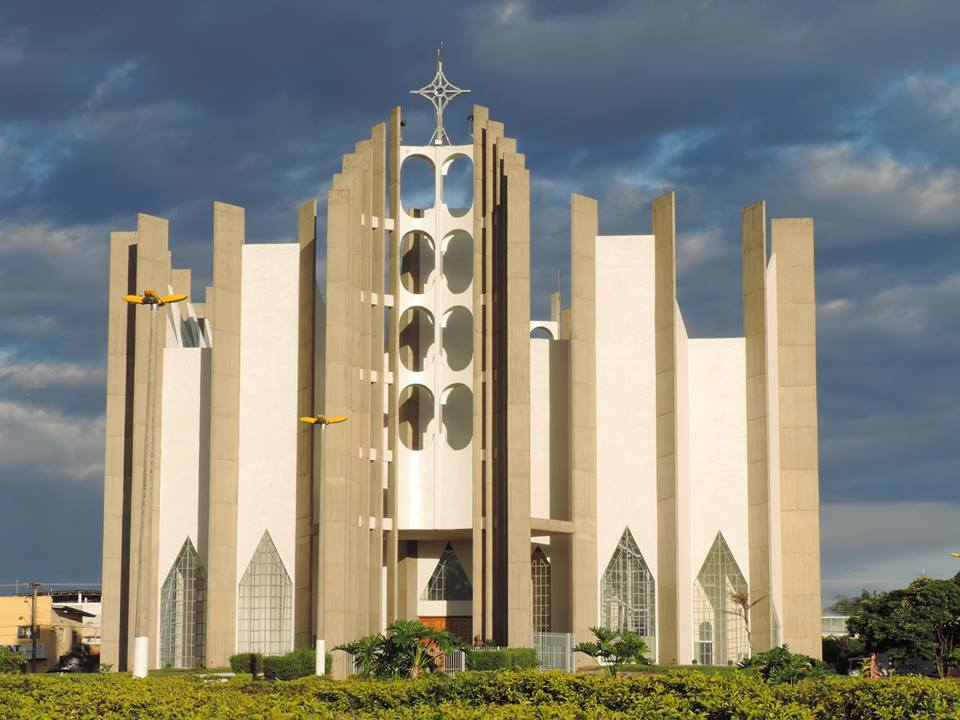
- Holy Spirit Cathedral
- 17°53′09″S 51°43′26″W
- Location: Jataí
- Country: Brazil
- Denomination: Roman Catholic Church

Administration
- Diocese: Roman Catholic Diocese of Jataí

The Holy Spirit Cathedral (also Jataí Cathedral or more formally Cathedral of the Divine Holy Spirit; Portuguese: Catedral Divino Espírito Santo) is a Catholic church and a symbol and monument of the city of Jataí, in the state of Goiás, Brazil.

The Jataí cathedral draws attention for its grandeur and modern architecture. The building was begun in 1984, and the work took nine years to complete. It was dedicated on October 2, 1993, to the Holy Spirit, with the presence of the then Apostolic Nuncio in Brazil, Archbishop Alfio Rapisarda. Viewed from above, the church resembles the shape of a honeycomb. Its facade has twelve columns that symbolize the apostles of Christ.

Inside, it has an immense panel of sacred art, painted by the famous artist Cláudio Pastro, with paintings representing important passages of the Old and New Testaments. It also has a crypt where the bishops are buried.

== See also ==
- Roman Catholicism in Brazil
- Holy Spirit Cathedral
