= Rodolfo Francisco Bobadilla Mata =

Guatemalan Roman Catholic bishop (1932–2019)

Rodolfo Francisco Bobadilla Mata CM
- Bishop of Huehuetenango
- Church: Catholic Church
- Diocese: Diocese of Huehuetenango
- In office: 28 September 1996 – 14 May 2012
- Predecessor: Julio Amílcar Bethancourt Fioravanti
- Successor: Álvaro Leonel Ramazzini Imeri
- Previous posts: Titular Bishop of Lari Castellum (1987-1996); Vicar Apostolic of El Petén (1987-1996)

Orders
- Ordination: 13 August 1958
- Consecration: 27 June 1987 by Oriano Quilici

Personal details
- Born: 16 October 1932 Guatemala City, Guatemala
- Died: 13 April 2019 (aged 86)

Rodolfo Francisco Bobadilla Mata (16 October 1932 – 13 April 2019) was a Guatemalan Roman Catholic bishop.

== Biography ==
Bobadilla Mata born in Guatemala and was ordained to the priesthood in 1958. He served as bishop of the Apostolic Vicariate of El Petén, Guatemala, from 1987 to 1995. He served as bishop of the Roman Catholic Diocese of Huehuetenango, Guatemala, from 1996 to 2012.
