= Holy Spirit Cathedral, Divinópolis =

Holy Spirit Cathedral
- Catedral Divino Espírito Santo
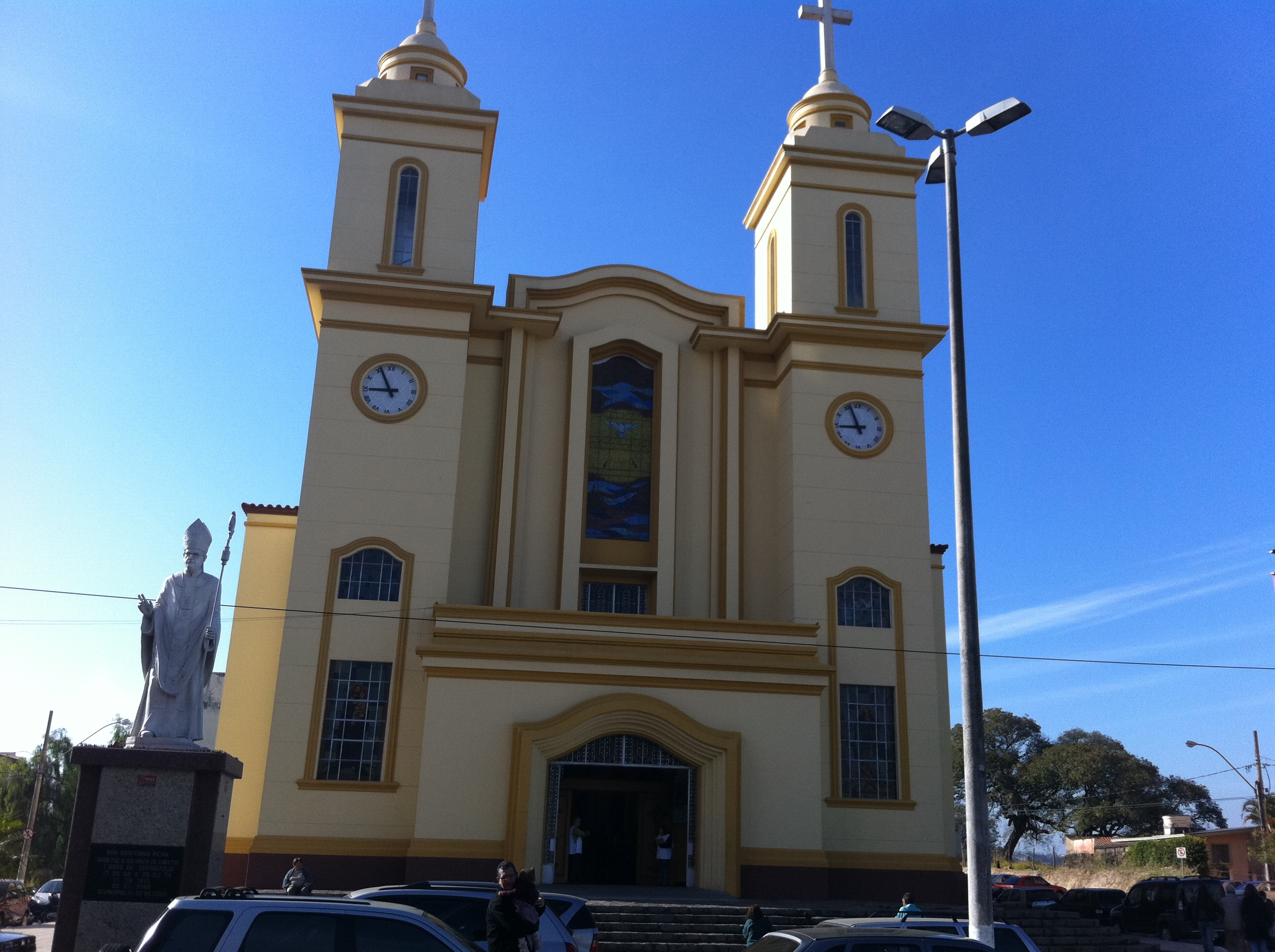
- Holy Spirit Cathedral
- 20°8′20.31″S 44°53′2.71″W
- Location: Divinópolis
- Country: Brazil
- Denomination: Roman Catholic Church

Architecture
- Architectural type: church

The Holy Spirit Cathedral (Portuguese: Catedral Divino Espírito Santo) also Divinópolis Cathedral is a Roman Catholic church located in Divinópolis, in the state of Minas Gerais, in Brazil. It is also the seat of the Catholic Diocese of Divinópolis.

The first chapel was erected on the site in 1767, dedicated to the Holy Spirit and St. Francis of Paula. In 1830 a fire destroyed the chapel, which was rebuilt in 1834. Some time later, the chapel was destroyed again by another fire. In its place a new temple was constructed. With the construction of the present cathedral, the old church was finally demolished in 1958.

The former Cure of the Holy Spirit was elevated to parish on April 3, 1839, by State Law 138. The following year, the parish was suppressed and returned to the parish status. The parish was established on April 7, 1841. On July 11, 1958, the diocese of Divinópolis was created and the church was elevated to the status of a diocesan cathedral.

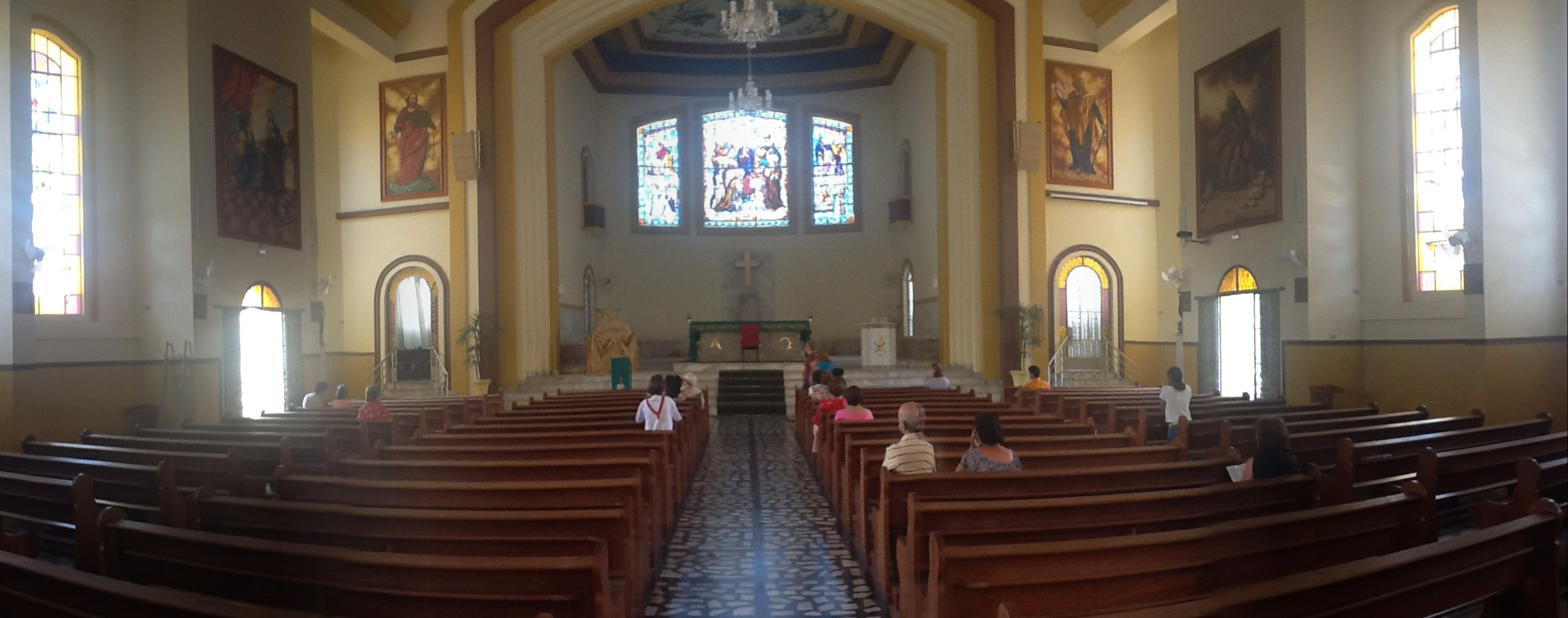
internal view

== See also ==
- Roman Catholicism in Brazil
- Holy Spirit Cathedral
