= Carlos Enrique Trinidad Gómez =

Guatemalan Roman Catholic bishop

- Bishop of San Marcos
- Church: Catholic Church
- Diocese: Diocese of San Marcos
- In office: 4 November 2014 – 9 May 2018
- Predecessor: Álvaro Leonel Ramazzini Imeri
- Successor: Bernabé de Jesús Sagastume Lemus

Orders
- Ordination: 22 December 1984
- Consecration: 31 January 2015 by Nicolas Thévenin

Personal details
- Born: 18 March 1955 Guatemala City, Guatemala
- Died: 9 May 2018 (aged 63)

Carlos Enrique Trinidad Gómez (18 March 1955 – 9 May 2018) was a Roman Catholic bishop.

Trinidad Gómez was born in Guatemala and was ordained to the priesthood. He served as bishop of the Roman Catholic Diocese of San Marcos, Guatemala, from 2014 until his death in 2018.
