= Apostolic Vicariate of El Petén =

Roman Catholic ecclesiastical territory in Guatemala

Vicariate Apostolic of El Petén Apostolicus Vicariatus de El Petén
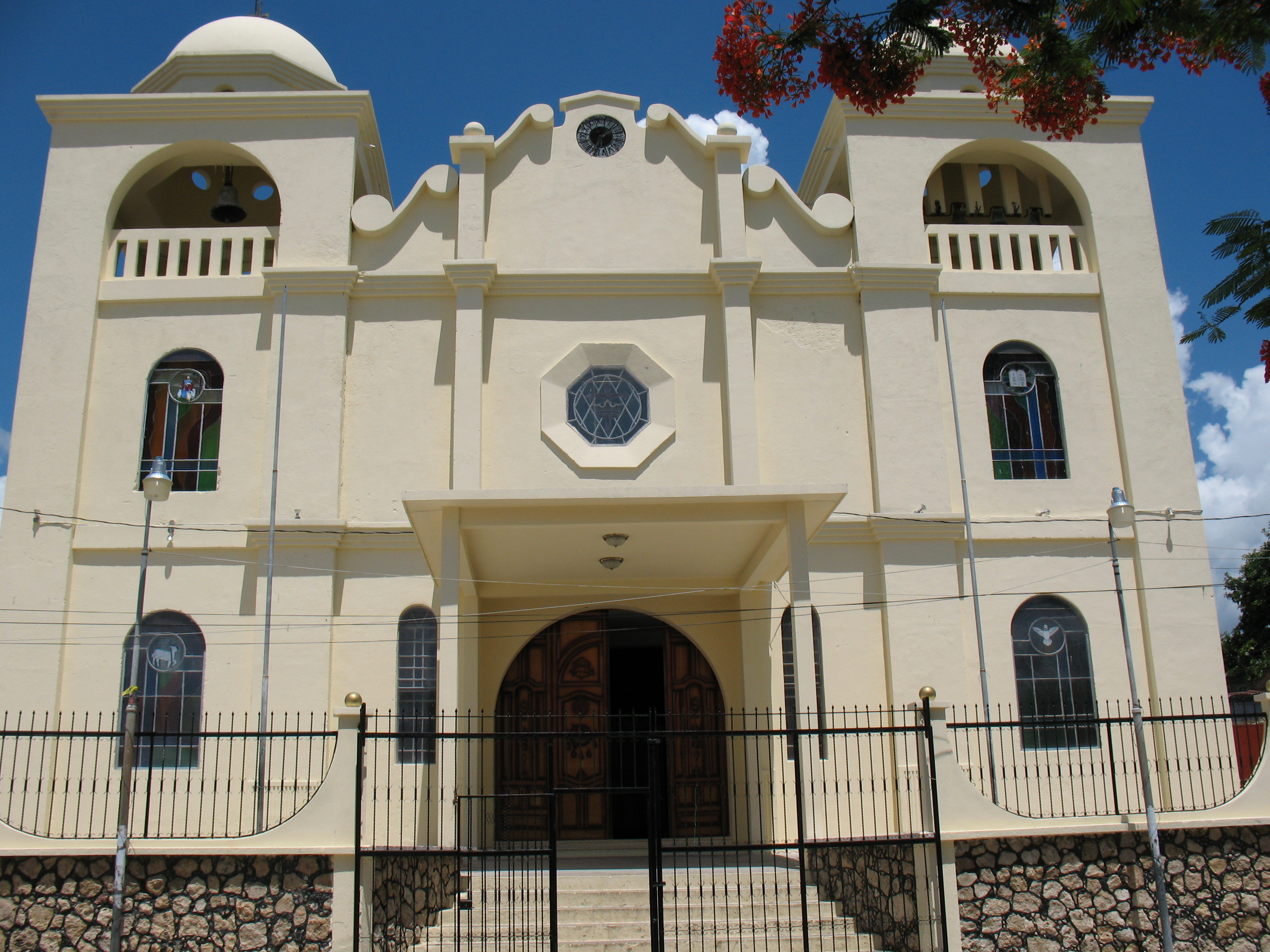
- Catedral Nuestra Señora de Los Remedios y San Pablo Itzá

Location
- Country: Guatemala
- Ecclesiastical province: Exempt directly to the Holy See

Statistics
- Area: 36,000 km^{2} (14,000 sq mi)
- Population: Total; Catholics: (as of 2010); 753,000; 560,000 (74.4%)
- Parishes: 17

Information
- Denomination: Catholic Church
- Sui iuris church: Latin Church
- Rite: Roman Rite
- Established: 10 March 1951 (74 years ago)
- Cathedral: Catedral Nuestra Señora de Los Remedios y San Pablo Itzá

Current leadership
- Pope: Francis
- Bishop: Mario Fiandri, S.D.B.

Map
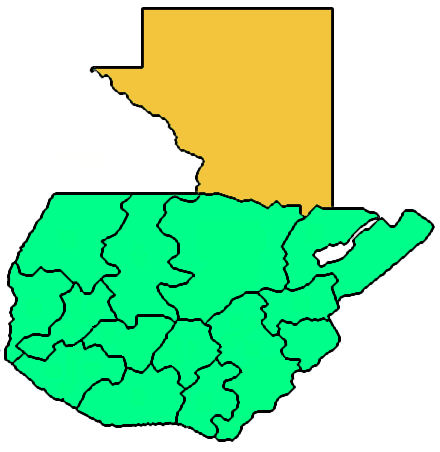

The Vicariate Apostolic of El Petén (Latin: Vicariatus Apostolicus de El Petén) is a Latin Church ecclesiastical jurisdiction or apostolic vicariate of the Catholic Church in Petén Department, Guatemala.

Its cathedral is the Catedral Nuestra Señora de Los Remedios y San Pablo Itzá, in see of Flores, Guatemala.

== History ==
It was erected 10 March 1951, as the apostolic administration of El Petén.

It was elevated to apostolic vicariate on 3 February 1984, hence entitled to a titular bishop, but remains directly exempt to the Holy See, not part of any ecclesiastical province.

== Ordinaries ==
Apostolic Administrators of El Petén

- Raymundo Julian Martín, Dominican Order (O.P.) Apostolic Administrator ad nutum Sanctae Sedis (1951.03.10 – 1956), while Bishop of Vera Paz (Guatemala) (1945.11.14 – 1966.05.28)
- Gabriel Viñamata Castelsagué, Saint Francis Xavier Spanish Institute for Foreign Missions (I.E.M.E.) (1956.07.11 – death 1964)
- Gennaro Artazcor Lizarrage, I.E.M.E. (1964.01.04 – death 1969)
- Aguado Arraux, I.E.M.E. (1969 – death 1970)
- Luis María Estrada Paetau, O.P. (1970.11.30 – 1977.10.27), later Apostolic Administrator of Izabal (Guatemala) (1977.10.27 – 1988.03.12) & Titular Bishop of Regiæ (1977.10.27 – 2011.03.25), Apostolic Vicar of above Izabal (1988.03.12 – 2004.05.21)
- Jorge Mario Avila del Aguila, Lazarists (C.M.) (1987.01.29 – 2001.12.05 see below)

Apostolic Vicars of El Petén

- Jorge Mario Avila del Aguila, C.M. (see above 1984.02.03 – 1987.01.29), Titular Bishop of Nasai (1982.12.03 – 1987.01.29); later Bishop of Jalapa (Guatemala) (1987.01.29 – 2001.12.05), Secretary General of Episcopal Secretariat of Central America and Panama (1988–1992), President of Episcopal Conference of Guatemala (1994–1998)
- Rodolfo Francisco Bobadilla Mata, C.M. (1987.05.15 – 1996.09.28), Titular Bishop of Lari Castellum (1987.05.15 – 1996.09.28), later Bishop of Huehuetenango (Guatemala) (1996.09.28 – 2012.05.14)
- Oscar Julio Vian Morales, Salesians of Don Bosco (S.D.B.) (1996.11.30 – 2007.04.19), Titular Bishop of Pupiana (1996.11.30 – 2007.04.19), later Metropolitan Archbishop of Los Altos, Quetzaltenango–Totonicapán (Guatemala) (2007.04.19 – 2010.10.02), Metropolitan Archbishop of Guatemala (2010.10.02 – 2013.04.25), restyled Metropolitan Archbishop of Santiago de Guatemala (Guatemala) (2013.04.25 – ...)
- Pro-Vicar Apostolic Octavio Sassu, O.P. (2007 – 2009.02.10)
- Mario Fiandri, S.D.B. (2009.02.10 – ...), Titular Bishop of Madarsuma (2009.02.10 – ...)
