= Rodolfo Quezada Toruño =

Guatemalan Catholic cardinal (1932–2012)

His Eminence Rodolfo Quezada Toruño
- Cardinal, Archbishop emeritus of Guatemala City
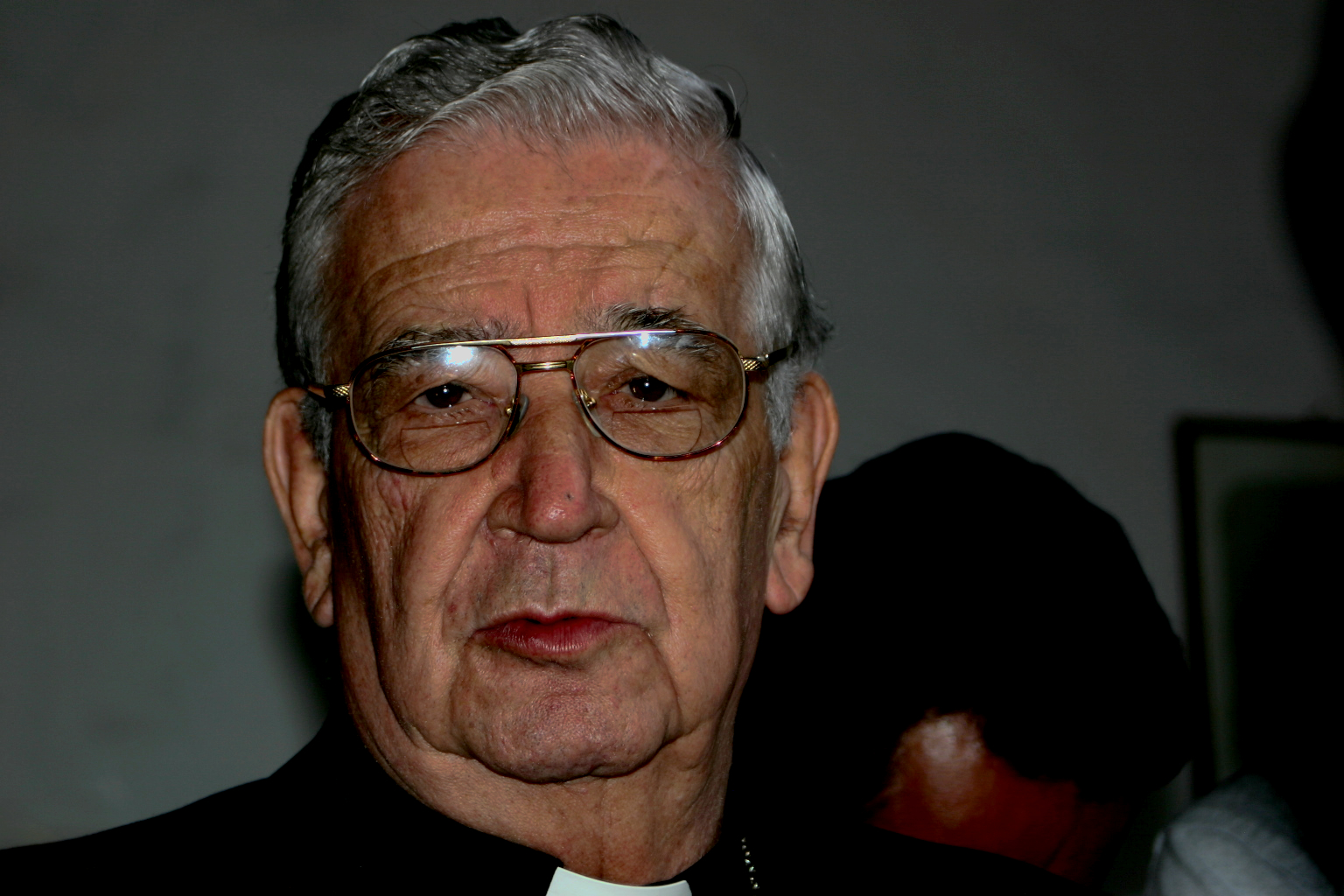
- See: Guatemala City
- Installed: 15 July 2003
- Predecessor: Próspero Penados del Barrio
- Successor: Oscar Julio Vian Morales, S.D.B.
- Other posts: Auxiliary Bishop of Zacapa (1972–1975); Coadjutor Bishop of Zacapa (1975–1980); Bishop of Zacapa y Santo Cristo de Esquipulas (1980–2001)

Orders
- Ordination: 21 September 1956
- Consecration: 13 May 1972
- Created cardinal: 21 October 2003 by John Paul II
- Rank: Cardinal Priest

Personal details
- Born: 8 March 1932 Guatemala City, Guatemala
- Died: 4 June 2012 (aged 80) Guatemala City, Guatemala

Styles of Rodolfo Quezada Toruño
- Reference style: His Eminence
- Spoken style: Your Eminence
- Informal style: Cardinal
- See: Guatemala City (emeritus)

Rodolfo Ignacio Quezada Toruño (8 March 1932 – 4 June 2012) was a Guatemalan Catholic prelate who served as Archbishop of Santiago de Guatemala from 2003 to 2010. He previously served as Bishop of Zacapa y Santo Cristo de Esquipulas from 1980 to 2001. He was elevated to the cardinalate in 2003.

== Biography ==
The oldest of three children, Quezada was born in Guatemala City to René Quezada Alejos and Clemencia Toruño Lizarralde. After studying philosophy at the Seminary of San José in El Salvador, he earned a Licentiate in Theology from the University of Innsbruck in Austria in 1959 and a Doctorate in Canon Law from the Pontifical Gregorian University in Rome in 1962. Quezada was ordained to the priesthood by Archbishop Mariano Rossell y Arellano on 21 September 1956. He served as parochial vicar of El Sagrario, rector of Beatas di Belén, university chaplain as well as vice-chancellor of the Archdiocese of Guatemala City. He was the first rector of the National Major Seminary of the Assumption in Guatemala, and named Chaplain of His Holiness on 18 August 1968. He also taught canon law at the Salesian Theological Institute and Rafael Landívar University, and ethics at the University of San Carlos of Guatemala.

On 5 April 1972, Quezada was appointed Auxiliary Bishop of Zacapa and Titular Bishop of Gadiaufala by Pope Paul VI. He received his episcopal consecration on the following 13 May from Archbishop Girolamo Prigione, with Bishops Costantino Luna Pianegonda, O.F.M., and José Pellecer Samayoa serving as co-consecrators, in the metropolitan cathedral of Santiago. He was named Coadjutor Bishop of Zacapa on 11 September 1975, and later succeeded Bishop Luna Pianegonda as Bishop of Zacapa on 16 February 1980. When the Territorial Prelature of Santo Cristo de Esquípulas was merged with his East Guatemalan diocese on 24 June 1986, he became known as Bishop of Zacapa y Santo Cristo de Esquipulas. He served as President of the Guatemalan Episcopal Conference from 1988 to 1992, and again from 2002 to 2006.

Quezada became a national hero by helping to bring to an end the civil war that devastated his country for 36 years. He led two organizations that played important roles in forming a peace agreement: the National Reconciliation Commission, which he headed from 1987 to 1993, and the Assembly of the Civil Society, which he headed from 1994 to 1996. He was also the official conciliator between the government and the guerrillas of the National Revolutionary Unit (1990–1994). His assistant in the peace process, Bishop Juan Gerardi, was murdered in April 1998.

On 19 June 2001, Quezada was promoted to Archbishop of Guatemala City by Pope John Paul II. He was created Cardinal-Priest of San Saturnino in the consistory of 21 October 2003. He was one of the cardinal electors who participated in the 2005 papal conclave that selected Pope Benedict XVI. Within the Roman Curia, he was a member of the Pontifical Council for Culture and the Pontifical Commission for Latin America.

His resignation was accepted by Pope Benedict XVI on 4 October 2010, when he was succeeded as Metropolitan Archbishop of Guatemala by Archbishop Oscar Julio Vian Morales, S.D.B., who until then had been Archbishop of the Roman Catholic Archdiocese of Los Altos, Quetzaltenango-Totonicapan, also in Guatemala. Cardinal Quezada was then referred to as Archbishop Emeritus of the see. On 8 March 1992, he reached age 80 and ceased to be a cardinal elector.

== Death ==
Cardinal Quezada Toruño died the morning of 4 June 2012 at a private hospital in Guatemala City due to complications of a bowel obstruction.
