= Quetzaltenango Cathedral =

Holy Spirit Cathedral
- Catedral del Espíritu Santo de Quetzaltenango
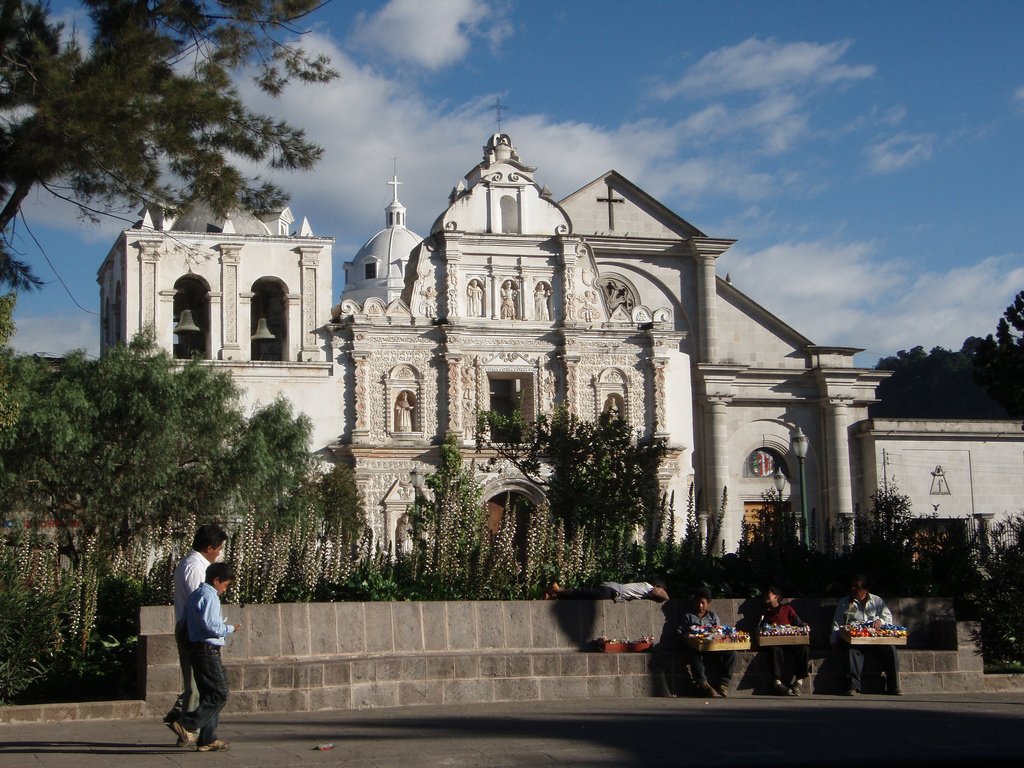
- Holy Spirit Cathedral
- 14.8336634°N 91.5202886°W
- Location: Quetzaltenango
- Country: Guatemala
- Denomination: Roman Catholic Church

Architecture
- Architectural type: church

The Holy Spirit Cathedral (Spanish: Catedral del Espíritu Santo de Quetzaltenango), also called Quetzaltenango Cathedral, is a Catholic church in Quetzaltenango, Guatemala. It was founded by the conquistadors, shortly after having defeated the legendary local hero Tecun Uman. The city was dedicated by the Spanish to the Holy Spirit.

This church, one of the first to be founded in Quetzaltenango, contains two of the most revered images of the region: The Divine Just Judge and the Virgin of the Rosary. The two images come out in procession on Good Friday and during the holidays in October respectively.

The present cathedral suffered at least three changes in the last modification remained the facade.

== See also ==
- Roman Catholicism in Guatemala
- Holy Spirit Cathedral
