= Victor Hugo Martínez Contreras =

Guatemalan Catholic priest (1930–2020)

Víctor Hugo Martínez Contreras
- Archbishop of Los Altos, Quetzaltenango-Totonicapán
- Church: Catholic Church
- Archdiocese: Archdiocese of Los Altos Quetzaltenango-Totonicapán
- In office: 13 February 1996 – 19 April 2007
- Predecessor: Óscar García Urizar
- Successor: Óscar Julio Vian Morales
- Previous posts: Bishop of Quetzaltenango, Los Altos(1987-1996); Bishop of Huehuetenango (1975-1987)Titular Bishop of Naissus (1970-1975); Auxiliary Bishop of Huehuetenango (1970-1975)

Orders
- Ordination: 8 December 1956 by Celestino Miguel Fernández Pérez
- Consecration: 10 January 1971 by Girolamo Prigione

Personal details
- Born: 29 March 1930 San Felipe, Retalhuleu, Guatemala
- Died: 26 August 2020 (aged 90) Guatemala City, Guatemala

Víctor Hugo Martínez Contreras (29 March 1930 – 26 August 2020) was a Guatemalan Roman Catholic archbishop.

Martínez Contreras was born in Guatemala and was ordained to the priesthood in 1956. He served as auxiliary bishop of the Roman Catholic Diocese of Huehuetenango, Guatemala, from 1970 to 1975 and as bishop of the diocese from 1975 to 1987. He served as bishop from 1987 to 1996, and then the archbishop of the Roman Catholic Archdiocese of Los Altos, Quetzaltenango-Totonicapán, Guatemala from 1996 to 2007.
