= Episcopal Conference of Guatemala =

Assembly of Catholic bishops

The Episcopal Conference of Guatemala (Spanish: Conferencia Episcopal de Guatemala, CEG) is the Roman Catholic Episcopal Conference of Guatemala. The CEG is a member of the Latin American Episcopal Conference and the Central Episcopal Secretariat of America (CESA).

== See also ==
- Catholic Church in Guatemala
