= Diocese of Sololá-Chimaltenango =

Roman Catholic diocese in Guatemala

Diocese of Sololá-Chimaltenango Dioecesis Sololensis-Chimaltenangensis
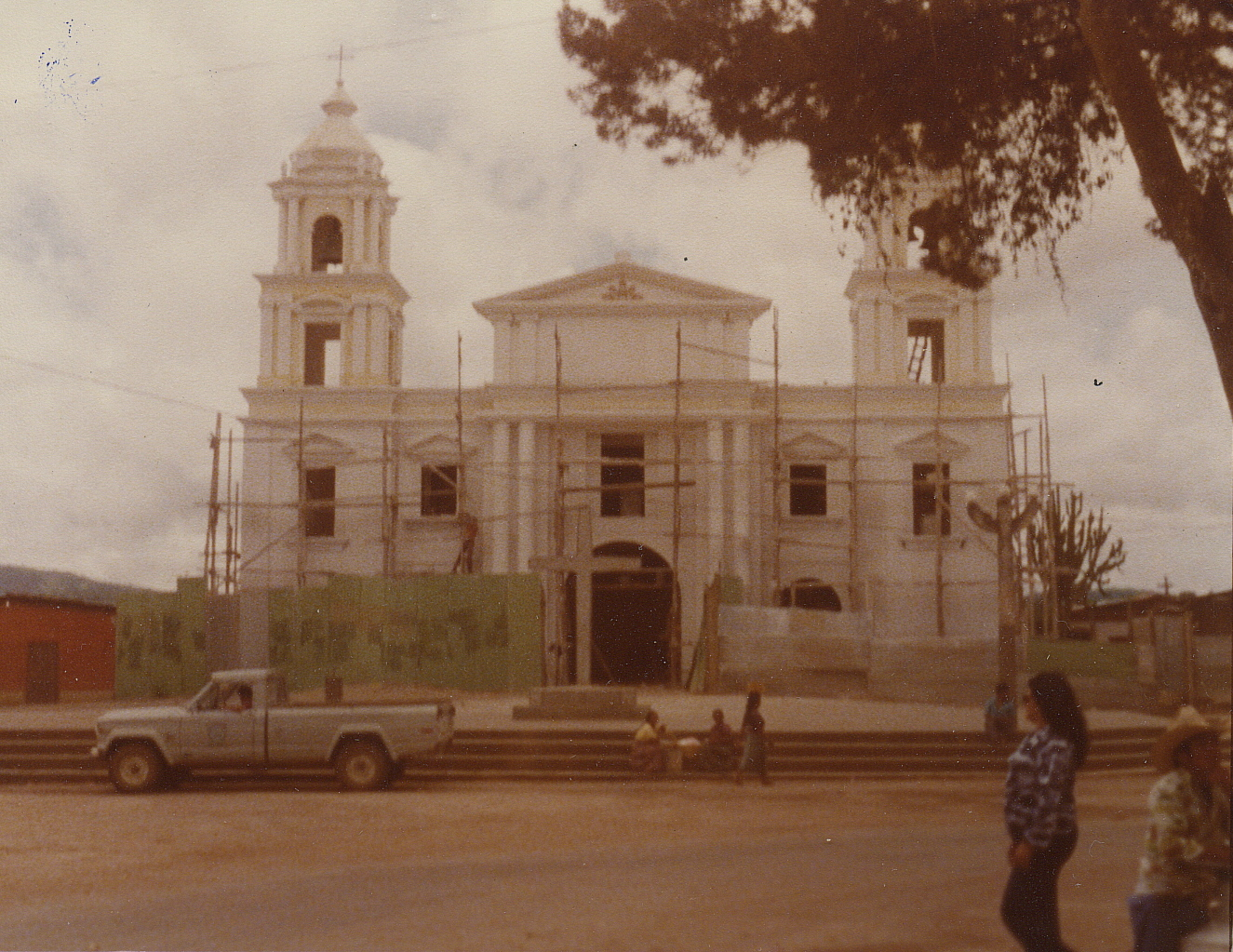
- Concatedral Santa Ana, Chimaltenangensis

Location
- Country: Guatemala
- Ecclesiastical province: Province of Los Altos Quetzaltenango-Totonicapán
- Metropolitan: Mario Alberto Molina Palma, O.A.R.

Statistics
- Area: 3,040 km^{2} (1,170 sq mi)
- Population: Total; Catholics: (as of 2010); 924,000; 744,000 (80.5%)
- Parishes: 34

Information
- Denomination: Roman Catholic
- Rite: Roman Rite
- Established: 10 March 1951 (74 years ago)
- Cathedral: Catedral Nuestra Señora de la Asunción
- Co-cathedral: Concatedral Santa Ana

Current leadership
- Pope: Leo XIV
- Bishop: Domingo Buezo Leiva

Map
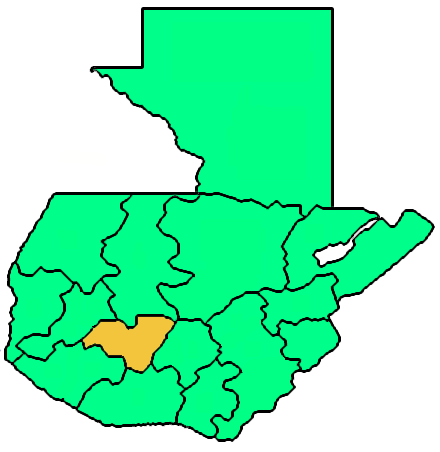

The Roman Catholic Diocese of Sololá-Chimaltenango is a Latin suffragan diocese in the ecclesiastical province of the Archdiocese of Los Altos Quetzaltenango-Totonicapán in Guatemala's southern interior.

It has a Cathedral episcopal see, Catedral Nuestra Señora de la Asunción, in Sololá, and a Co-Cathedral Concatedral Santa Ana, in Chimaltenango.

== History ==
It was erected on 10 March 1951, as the Diocese of Sololá, on territories split off from the Diocese of Quetzaltenango, Los Altos and the Metropolitan Archdiocese of Guatemala.

On 27 April 1967, it lost territory to establish the Diocese of Santa Cruz del Quiché. It was renamed Diocese of Sololá-Chimaltenango on 31 December 1996.

== Bishops ==
Suffragan Bishops of Sololá

- Apostolic Administrator Jorge García Cabalieros (1951.03.10 – 1955.04.05), while Bishop of Quetzaltenango, Los Altos (Guatemala) (1928.06.30 – 1955.04.05), also Apostolic Administrator of San Marcos (Guatemala) (1951.03.10 – 1955.04.05)
- Angélico Melotto Mazzardo, O.F.M. (1959.06.27 – 1986.04.05), also President of Episcopal Conference of Guatemala (1978–1980)

Suffragan Bishops of Sololá-himaltenango

- Eduardo Ernesto Fuentes Duarte (1986.04.05 – death 1997.07.20), succeeding as former Coadjutor Bishop of Sololá (1982.10.18 – 1986.04.05); previously Titular Bishop of Lares (1980.04.09 – 1982.10.18) & Auxiliary Bishop of above Guatemala (1980.04.09 – 1982.10.18)
- Raúl Antonio Martinez Paredes (1999.01.28 – 2007.07.28); later Titular Bishop of Mizigi (2007.07.28 – ...) & Auxiliary Bishop of Santiago de Guatemala (Guatemala) (2007.07.28 – ...)
- Gonzalo de Villa y Vásquez, S.J. (28 July 2007 – 9 July 2020), previously Titular Bishop of Rotaria (2004.07.09 – 2007.07.28) & Auxiliary Bishop of Guatemala (Guatemala) (2004.07.09 – 2007.07.28); also Apostolic Administrator of Los Altos, Quetzaltenango–Totonicapán (Guatemala) (2010.10 – 2011.07.14); appointed Archbishop of Santiago de Guatemala
- Domingo Buezo Leiva (16 July 2021 – present)

=== Coadjutor bishop ===
- Eduardo Ernesto Fuentes Duarte (1982–1986)

== Sources and external links ==
- GigaCatholic with incumbent biography links
