= Luis Manresa Formosa =

His Excellency Luis Manresa Formosa S.J.
- Bishop of Los Altos Quetzaltenango-Totonicapan
- Church: Roman Catholic Church
- See: Archdiocese of Los Altos Quetzaltenango-Totonicapan
- In office: 1955–1979
- Predecessor: Jorge García Cabalieros
- Successor: Oscar Garcia Urizar
- Previous post: Priest

Orders
- Ordination: July 29, 1948
- Consecration: 6 January 1956 by Gennaro Verolino
- Rank: Bishop

Personal details
- Born: April 8, 1915 Guatemala City, Guatemala
- Died: December 25, 2010 (aged 95)

Luis Manresa Formosa S.J. (April 8, 1915 – December 25, 2010) was a Guatemalan prelate of the Roman Catholic Church.

Luis Manresa Formosa was born in Guatemala City, Guatemala in the spring of 1915. He was ordained as a priest on July 29, 1948, at the Catholic religious order of the Society of Jesus. On November 30, 1955, he was appointed as bishop of the Diocese of Los Altos Quetzaltenango-Totonicapan. He was then ordained bishop on January 6, 1956. On May 30, 1979, he resigned in his post.
