= Diocese of Suchitepéquez-Retalhuleu =

Roman Catholic diocese in Guatemala

Diocese of Suchitepéquez-Retalhuleu Dioecesis Suchitepequensis-Retalhulensis

Location
- Country: Guatemala
- Ecclesiastical province: Province of Los Altos Quetzaltenango-Totonicapán
- Metropolitan: Mario Alberto Molina Palma, O.A.R.

Statistics
- Area: 4,366 km^{2} (1,686 sq mi)
- Population: Total; Catholics: (as of 2010); 707,000; 496,000 (70.2%)
- Parishes: 18

Information
- Denomination: Roman Catholic
- Rite: Roman Rite
- Established: 31 December 1996 (28 years ago)
- Cathedral: Catedral San Bartolomé

Current leadership
- Pope: Leo XIV
- Bishop: Pablo Vizcaíno Prado

Map
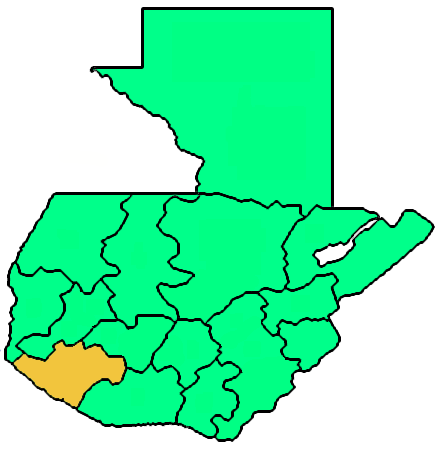

The Roman Catholic Diocese of Suchitepéquez-Retalhuleu (erected 31 December 1996) is a suffragan diocese of the Archdiocese of Los Altos Quetzaltenango-Totonicapán.

== Ordinaries ==
- Pablo Vizcaíno Prado (1996– )

== External links and references ==
- "Diocese of Suchitepéquez-Retalhuleu". Catholic-Hierarchy.
