= Apostolic Vicariate of Izabal =

Roman Catholic ecclesiastical territory in Guatemala

Vicariate Apostolic of Izabal Vicariatus Apostolicus Izabalensis Vicariato Apostólico de Izabal
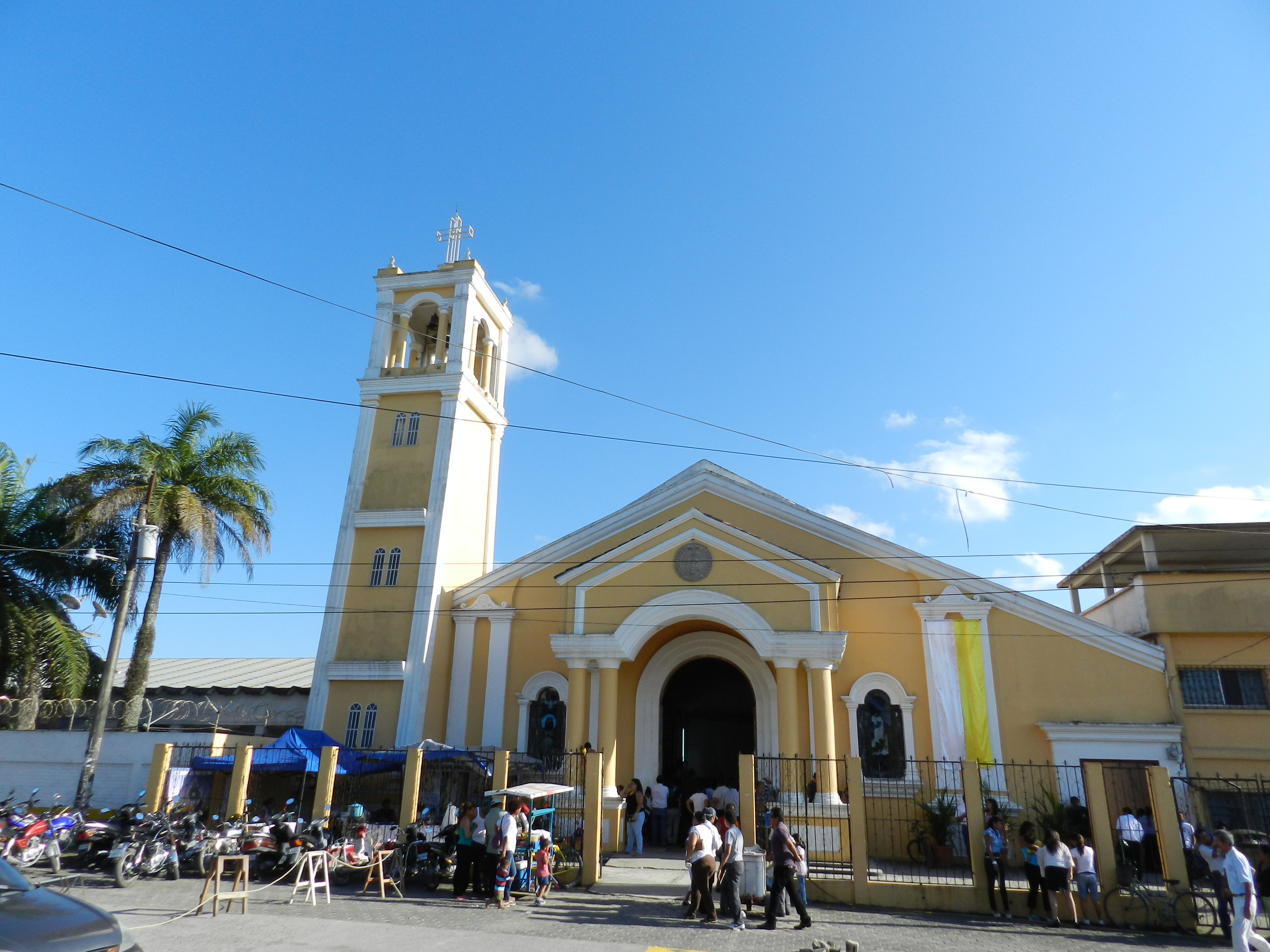

Location
- Country: Guatemala
- Ecclesiastical province: Exempt directly to the Holy See
- Headquarters: Puerto Barrios, Izabal Department, Guatemala
- Coordinates: 15.7211°N 88.5886°W

Statistics
- Area: 9,038 km^{2} (3,490 sq mi)
- Population: Total; Catholics: (as of 2024); 519,000; 249,000 (48.0%)
- Parishes: 19

Information
- Denomination: Catholic Church
- Sui iuris church: Latin Church
- Rite: Roman Rite
- Established: 30 April 1968; 58 years ago
- Cathedral: Catedral Inmaculada Concepción de María
- Patron saint: Immaculate Conception
- Secular priests: 28 (24 Diocesan, 4 Religious Orders)

Current leadership
- Pope: Leo XIV
- Apostolic Vicar: Sede vacante
- Bishops emeritus: Gabriel Peñate Rodríguez

Map
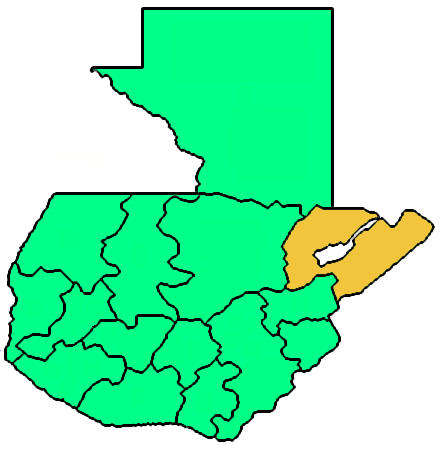

The Apostolic Vicariate of Izabal is a Latin Church ecclesiastical territory or apostolic vicariate of the Catholic Church in eastern Guatemala's Izabal Department. It is exempt directly to the Holy See and not part of any ecclesiastical province.

Its cathedral is Catedral Inmaculada Concepción de María, in the see of Puerto Barrios.

== History ==
It was erected 30 April 1968, as the "Apostolic Administration of Izabal", on territory split off from the Diocese of Zacapa. It was elevated as an apostolic vicariate on 12 March 1988.

== Episcopal ordinaries ==
Apostolic Administrators of Izabal

- Gerardo Humberto Flores Reyes (9 May 1969 – 7 October 1977), appointed Bishop of Verapaz, Cobán
- Luis María Estrada Paetau, O.P. (27 October 1977 – 12 March 1988 see below)

Apostolic Vicars of Izabal

- Luis María Estrada Paetau, O.P. (see above 12 March 1988 – 12 June 2004), resigned
- Gabriel Peñate Rodríguez (21 May 2004 – 26 July 2011), resigned
  - Apostolic Administrator Mario Enrique Ríos Montt, C.M. (26 July 2011 – 9 February 2013), Auxiliary Bishop of Guatemala
- Domingo Buezo Leiva (9 February 2013 – 16 July 2021), appointed Bishop of Sololá-Chimaltenango
  - Apostolic Administrator Raúl Antonio Martínez Paredes (21 September 2021 – 18 March 2023), Auxiliary Bishop of Santiago de Guatemala
- Miguel Ángel Martínez Méndez (23 December 2022 – 13 October 2026), appointed Coadjutor Bishop of Huehuetenango
