= Roman Catholic Diocese of San Marcos =

Roman Catholic diocese in Guatemala

Diocese of San Marcos Dioecesis Sancti Marci in Guatimala

Location
- Country: Guatemala
- Ecclesiastical province: Province of Los Altos Quetzaltenango-Totonicapán
- Metropolitan: Mario Alberto Molina Palma, OAR

Statistics
- Area: 3,791 km^{2} (1,464 sq mi)
- Population: Total; Catholics: (as of 2010); 862,000; 595,000 (69%)
- Parishes: 30

Information
- Denomination: Roman Catholic
- Rite: Roman Rite
- Established: 10 March 1951 (74 years ago)
- Cathedral: Catedral San Marcos

Current leadership
- Pope: Francis
- Bishop: Bernabé de Jesús Sagastume Lemus, OFMCap

Map
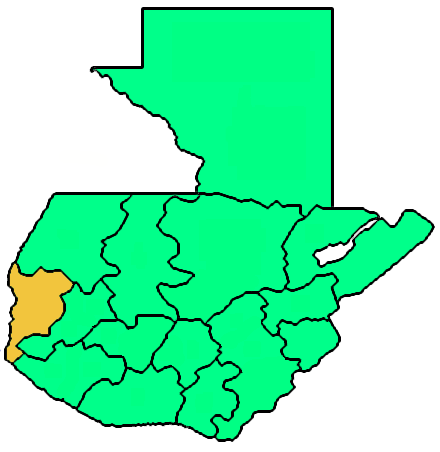

The Roman Catholic Diocese of San Marcos (erected 10 March 1951) is a suffragan diocese of the Archdiocese of Los Altos Quetzaltenango-Totonicapán.

== Bishops ==
=== Ordinaries ===
- Celestino Miguel Fernández Pérez, OFM (1955–1971)
- Próspero Penados del Barrio (1971–1983), appointed Archbishop of Guatemala
- Julio Amílcar Bethancourt Fioravanti (1984–1988), appointed Bishop of Huehuetenango
- Álvaro Leonel Ramazzini Imeri (1988–2012), appointed Bishop of Huehuetenango on 14 May 2012; future Cardinal
- Carlos Enrique Trinidad Gómez (2014–2018)
- Bernabé de Jesús Sagastume Lemus, OFMCap (2021–present)

=== Auxiliary bishops ===
- Próspero Penados del Barrio (1966–1971), appointed bishop

=== Other priest of this diocese who became bishop ===
- Félix Eduardo Antonio Calderón Cruz, appointed Bishop of San Francisco de Asís de Jutiapa in 2016

== Territorial losses ==
Year	Along with	To form
1961		Territorial Prelature of Huehuetenango
