= Diocese of Quiché =

Roman Catholic diocese in Guatemala

Diocese of Quiche Dioecesis Quicensis
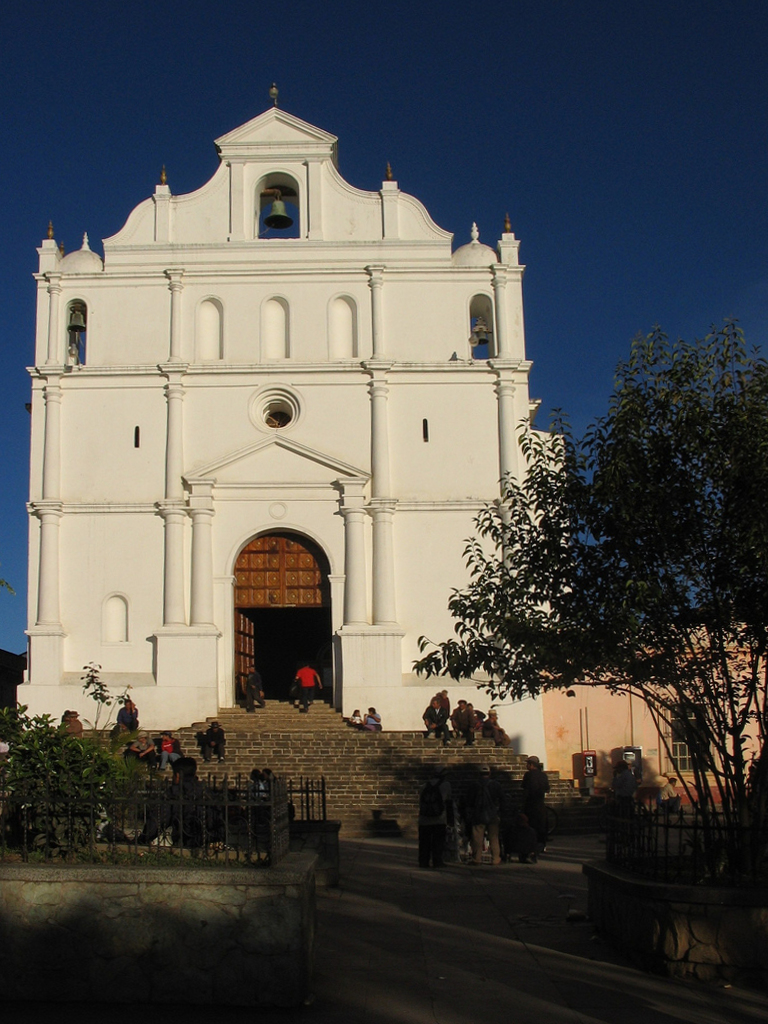
- Catedral de Santa Cruz

Location
- Country: Guatemala
- Territory: San Marcos
- Ecclesiastical province: Province of Los Altos Quetzaltenango-Totonicapán
- Metropolitan: Mario Alberto Molina Palma, O.A.R.

Statistics
- Area: 8,378 km^{2} (3,235 sq mi)
- Population: Total; Catholics: (as of 2010); 714,000; 503,000 (80%)
- Parishes: 26

Information
- Denomination: Roman Catholic
- Rite: Roman Rite
- Established: 27 April 1967 (58 years ago)
- Cathedral: Holy Cross Cathedral, Santa Cruz del Quiché

Current leadership
- Pope: Leo XIV
- Bishop: Juan Manuel Cuá Ajacum
- Bishops emeritus: Rosolino Bianchetti Boffelli

Map
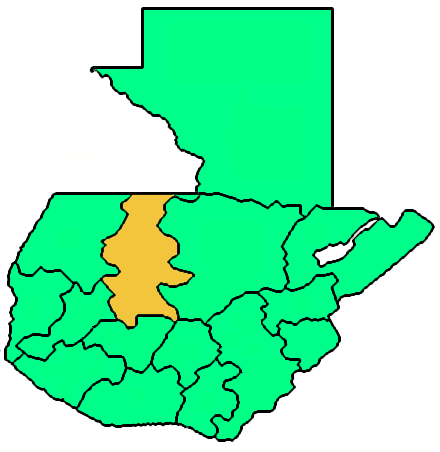

The Roman Catholic Diocese of Quiché is a Latin suffragan diocese in the ecclesiastical province of the Archdiocese of Los Altos Quetzaltenango-Totonicapán.

== History ==
It was erected 27 April 1967, as the Diocese of Santa Cruz del Quiché, on territory split off from the then Diocese of Sololá.

It was renamed on 11 July 2000.

== Episcopal ordinaries ==
(all Roman Rite)

Suffragan Bishops of Santa Cruz del Quiché

- Humberto Lara Mejía, Lazarists (C.M.) (1967.05.05 – 1972.06.09), previously Titular Bishop of Trajanopolis in Phrygia (1957.07.19 – 1967.05.05) & Auxiliary Bishop of Vera Paz (Guatemala) (1957.07.19 – 1967.05.05); also President of Episcopal Conference of Guatemala (1970–1972)
- ? José Julio Aguilar García (1972–1974)
- Juan José Gerardi Conedera (1974.08.22 – 1984.08.14), also President of Episcopal Conference of Guatemala (1970–1972); previously Bishop of Vera Paz (Guatemala) (1967.05.05 – 1974.08.22), President of Episcopal Conference of Guatemala (1972–1978); later Titular Bishop of Guardialfiera (1984.08.14 – 1998.04.26) & Auxiliary Bishop of Guatemala (Guatemala) (1984.08.14 – 1998.04.26)

Suffragan Bishops of Quiché

- Julio Edgar Cabrera Ovalle (1986.10.31 – 2001.12.05), later Bishop of Jalapa (Guatemala) (2001.12.05 – ...)
- Mario Alberto Molina Palma, Augustinian Recollects (O.A.R.) (2004.10.29 – 2011.07.14), later Metropolitan Archbishop of Los Altos Quetzaltenango-Totonicapán (Guatemala) (2011.07.14 – ...), vice-president of Episcopal Conference of Guatemala (2012.03 – ...)
- Rosolino Bianchetti Boffelli (2012.09.14 – ...), previously Bishop of Zacapa (Guatemala) (2008.11.20 – 2012.09.14), Bishop-Prelate of Santo Cristo de Esquipulas (Guatemala) (2008.11.20 – 2012.09.14)

== Source and external links ==
- GigaCatholic, with incumbent biography links
