= Diocese of Huehuetenango =

Roman Catholic diocese in Guatemala

Coordinates: 15.3208°N 91.4701°W

Diocese of Huehuetenango Dioecesis Gerontopolitana

Location
- Country: Guatemala
- Ecclesiastical province: Province of Los Altos Quetzaltenango-Totonicapán
- Metropolitan: Mario Alberto Molina Palma, O.A.R.

Statistics
- Area: 7,400 km^{2} (2,900 sq mi)
- Population: Total; Catholics: (as of 2010); 896,833; 690,519 (77%)
- Parishes: 31

Information
- Denomination: Roman Catholic
- Rite: Roman Rite
- Established: 22 July 1961 (65 years ago)
- Cathedral: Catedral de La Inmaculada Concepción

Current leadership
- Pope: Leo XIV
- Bishop: Alvaro Leonel Ramazzini Imeri

Map
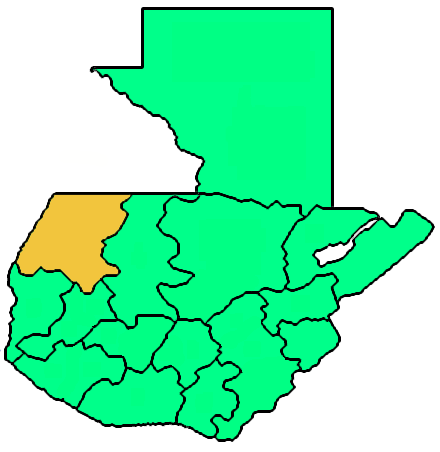

The Roman Catholic Diocese of Huehuetenango, Guatemala was first erected 22 July 1961, as the Territorial Prelature of Huehuetenango. It is a suffragan diocese of the Archdiocese of Los Altos Quetzaltenango-Totonicapán. It was elevated as a diocese on 23 December 1967.

== Bishops ==
=== Ordinaries ===
- Hugo Mark Gerbermann, M.M. (1961–1975)
- Victor Hugo Martínez Contreras (1975–1987), appointed Bishop of Quetzaltenango, Los Altos
- Julio Amílcar Bethancourt Fioravanti (1988–1996), appointed Bishop of Santa Rosa de Lima
- Rodolfo Francisco Bobadilla Mata, C.M. (1996–2012)
- Alvaro Leonel Ramazzini Imeri (since 2012), elevated to Cardinal in 2019

=== Auxiliary bishop ===
- Victor Hugo Martínez Contreras (1970–1975), appointed Bishop here

== External links and references ==
- "Diocese of Huehuetenango". Catholic-Hierarchy.
