= Archdiocese of Los Altos Quetzaltenango-Totonicapán =

Roman Catholic archdiocese in Guatemala

Coordinates: 14.8336°N 91.5179°W

Archdiocese of Los Altos Quetzaltenango-Totonicapán Archidioecesis Altensis, Quetzltenanguensis-Totonicapensis Arquidiócesis de Los Altos Quetzaltenango-Totonicapán
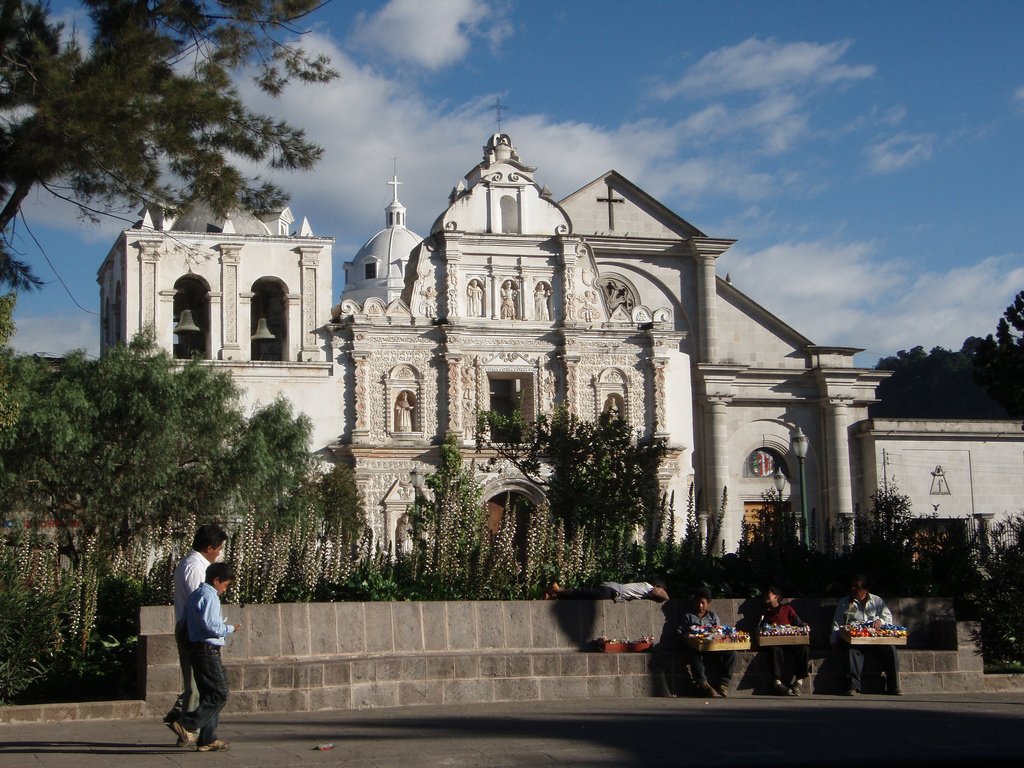
- Quetzaltenango Cathedral; Catedral del Espíritu Santo in Quetzaltenango

Location
- Country: Guatemala
- Territory: Quetzaltenango and Totonicapan
- Ecclesiastical province: Province of Los Altos Quetzaltenango-Totonicapán
- Headquarters: Quetzaltenango, Quetzaltenango Department, Guatemala

Statistics
- Area: 3,012 km^{2} (1,163 sq mi)
- Population: Total; Catholics: (as of 2023); 1,424,152; 712,076 (50.0%)
- Parishes: 38

Information
- Denomination: Roman Catholic
- Sui iuris church: Latin Church
- Rite: Roman Rite
- Established: 27 July 1921; 105 years ago
- Cathedral: Catedral del Espíritu Santo
- Co-cathedral: Catedral de San Miguel

Current leadership
- Pope: Leo XIV
- Metropolitan Archbishop: Victor Hugo Palma Paúl
- Bishops emeritus: Mario Alberto Molina Palma, O.A.R.

Map
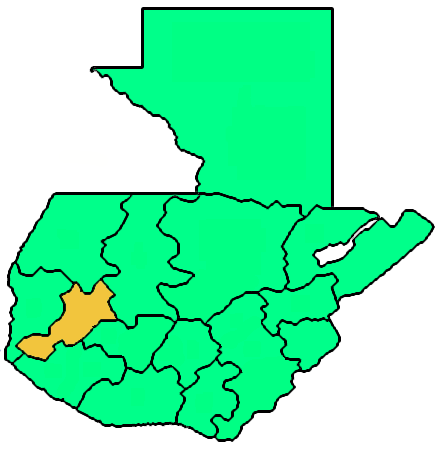

Website
- arquidiocesisdelosaltos.org

The Roman Catholic Archdiocese of Los Altos Quetzaltenango-Totonicapán (Latin: Archidioecesis Altensis, Quetzltenanguensis-Totonicapensis) is a Latin Metropolitan Archdiocese in Guatemala.

The archiepiscopal seat is Quetzaltenango Cathedral (Catedral del Espíritu Santo), initially built in Quetzaltenango in 1535. It also has a co-cathedral, San Miguel Arcángel, in Totonicapán.

It was headed by Mario Alberto Molina Palma until his retirement on 10 December 2024; the same day Víctor Hugo Palma Paúl was appointed to the archbishopric.

== History ==
It was erected on 27 July 1921 as the Diocese of Quetzaltenango, Los Altos, on territory split off from Guatemala's Metropolitan Roman Catholic Archdiocese.

On 10 March 1951, it lost territory to establish the Diocese of San Marcos and the Diocese of Sololá-Chimaltenango, both of which became its suffragans.

It was elevated and renamed Archdiocese of Los Altos Quetzaltenango-Totonicapán on 13 February 1996. It lost more territory on 31 December 1996 to establish the Diocese of Suchitepéquez-Retalhuleu, another suffragan.

== Province ==
Its ecclesiastical province comprises the Metropolitan's own Archdiocese and the following suffragan dioceses :

- Roman Catholic Diocese of Huehuetenango
- Roman Catholic Diocese of Quiché
- Roman Catholic Diocese of San Marcos
- Roman Catholic Diocese of Sololá-Chimaltenango
- Roman Catholic Diocese of Suchitepéquez-Retalhuleu.

== Extent ==
The Archdiocese covers the departments of Quetzaltenango and Totonicapán. It has 38 parishes, 45 diocesan priests, 30 religious priests, 41 friars and 80 nuns.

== Bishops ==
(all Roman Rite)

=== Episcopal ordinaries ===
Suffragan Bishops of Quetzaltenango, Los Altos

- Jorge García Caballeros (1928.06.30 – 1955.04.05)
- Luis Manresa Formosa, S.J. (1955.11.30 – 1979.05.30), resigned
- Oscar Garcia Urizar (1980.03.04 – 1987.01.08), resigned
- Victor Hugo Martínez Contreras (1987.04.04 – 1996.02.13 see below)

Metropolitan Archbishops of Los Altos, Quetzaltenango–Totonicapán

- Victor Hugo Martínez Contreras (see above 1996.02.13 – 2007.04.19), retired
- Oscar Julio Vian Morales, S.D.B. (2007.04.19 – 2010.10.02), appointed Archbishop of Guatemala
  - Apostolic administrator Gonzalo de Villa y Vásquez, S.J. (2010.10.02 – 2011.09.17), while Bishop of the suffragan see Sololá–Chimaltenango
- Mario Alberto Molina Palma, O.A.R. (2011.07.14 – 2024.12.10), retired
- Víctor Hugo Palma Paúl (2024.12.10 – Present)

=== Auxiliary bishops ===
- Rafael González Estrada (1944–1955), appointed Auxiliary Bishop of Guatemala
- Gerardo Humberto Flores Reyes (1966–1969), appointed Bishop of Verapaz, Cobán
- Juan Manuel Cuá Ajacum (2021-2023), appointed Bishop of Quiché

== Sources and external links ==
- GigaCatolic, with incumbent biography links
