= Mario Alberto Molina Palma =

Mario Alberto Molina Palma, OAR
- Archbishop of Los Altos Quetzaltenango-Totonicapán
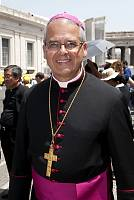
- Archbishop Mario Alberto Molina Palma
- Church: Roman Catholic Church
- Archdiocese: Archbishop of Los Altos Quetzaltenango-Totonicapán
- Province: Quetzaltenango-Totonicapán
- Metropolis: Quetzaltenango
- Installed: 17 September 2011
- Predecessor: Óscar Julio Vian Morales
- Other post: Bishop of Quiché

Orders
- Ordination: 29 June 1975
- Consecration: 22 January 2004

Personal details
- Born: Mario Alberto Molina Palma; 13 October 1948 (age 77) Panama City, Panama

Mario Alberto Molina Palma O.A.R. (born 13 October 1948) is archbishop of the Roman Catholic Archdiocese of Los Altos Quetzaltenango-Totonicapán since his appointment by Pope Benedict XVI on 14 July 2011. Molina Palma had previously served as bishop of Quiché in Guatemala. He was born in Panama City, ordained a priest in 1975, and appointed bishop of El Quiché in 2004. He was installed as Archbishop of Los Altos on 17 September 2011.
