= Jaime Hernández Méndez =

Guatemalan politician and general (born 1933)

Jaime Hernández Méndez (born June 14, 1933) is a retired Brigadier General of the Guatemalan Army who served as the first Minister of Defense of the new Democratic period that started with the free election of President Vinicio Cerezo in 1986. He served from January 14, 1986 to January 31, 1987.

He was part of the High Command of the Army that took charge of the country after the coup d'état against Efraín Ríos Montt in 1983. At that time he was the First Commander of the key base Guardia de Honor when General Óscar Mejía Victores took charge of the government.

Together with General Mejía Víctores as Head of State and Minister of Defense and General Rodolfo Lobos Zamora as Deputy Head of State and Chief of the National Defense General Staff, General Hernández started the process for the return to democracy with elections for a Constituent Assembly in 1984 followed by free general elections in 1985.
