= Guatemalan coup d'état =

Guatemalan coup d'état may refer to:

- 1954 Guatemalan coup d'état
- 1963 Guatemalan coup d'état
- 1982 Guatemalan coup d'état
- 1983 Guatemalan coup d'état
