= Rodolfo Lobos Zamora =

Guatemalan diplomat and military officer

General of Division Rodolfo Lobos Zamora
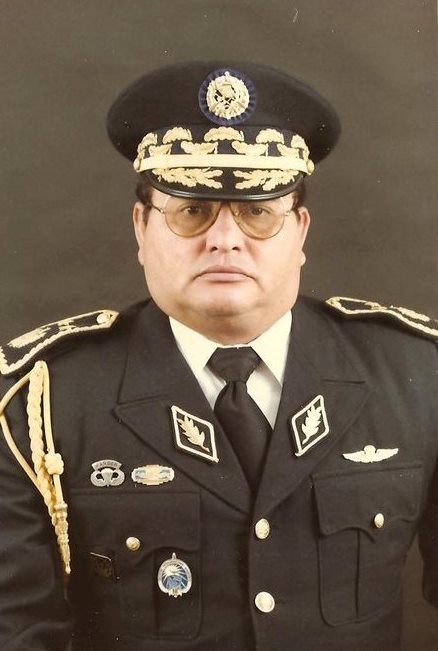
- Lobos Zamora in the 1980s

Deputy Head of State of Guatemala
- In office 8 August 1983 – 14 January 1986
- Head of State: Óscar Humberto Mejía Victores
- Preceded by: Óscar Mendoza Azurdia (as Vice President)
- Succeeded by: Roberto Carpio (as Vice President)

Personal details
- Born: 3 June 1936 Guatemala City, Guatemala
- Died: 18 April 1997 (aged 60) Guatemala City, Guatemala

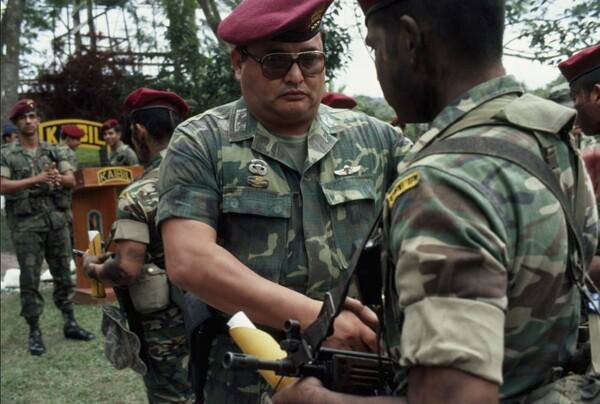
Rodolfo Lobos Zamora in the field

Rodolfo Lobos Zamora (3 June 1936 – 18 April 1997) was a Guatemalan general and diplomat. He rose to the position of Chief of Staff of the Guatemalan Army before being forced into retirement in 1985, after which he served as Assistant Chief of State and Guatemala's ambassador to Panama.

== Military career ==
Lobos Zamora began his military career in the 1950s, and was sent to study at the United States Army Infantry School, from which he graduated in 1959, and then the Escuela Militar in Colombia, from which he graduated in 1965. He later rose to the command of the Mariscal Zavala base in Guatemala City. After the coup d'état which followed the 1982 elections, he and fellow colonels César Augusto Cáceres Rojas and Héctor Gramajo Morales — two other Guatemalan officers who had studied counter-insurgency tactics at foreign military schools — created the National Plan of Security and Development.

In October 1983, Lobos Zamora was named Chief of Staff of the Guatemalan Army, succeeding Hector Mario Lopez Fuentes. Lobos Zamora had been expected to be promoted to Minister of Defence, but after Vinicio Cerezo emerged victorious in the 1985 elections, he forced Lobos Zamora to retire from the military, and named Jaime Hernández Méndez as Minister of Defence instead.

== Diplomatic career ==
In February 1984, Lobos Zamora was named to the newly created position of Assistant Chief of State under Óscar Humberto Mejía Victores. He flew to Taipei, Taiwan, that year as his country's official representative at the inauguration of Chiang Ching-kuo to his second term as president of the Republic of China (ROC), demonstrating the close ties between the two anti-communist governments. His opposition led to a delay of nearly five years in the ROC's plans to establish relations with Belize: in 1984, when then-ROC ambassador to Guatemala Gene Loh travelled to Belize to meet with William Quinto and Prime Minister George Price, Lobos Zamora made his displeasure known, and a CIA agent informed Loh that if the ROC went ahead with its plans, Guatemala might break off relations entirely.

In March 1986, Lobos Zamora was named Guatemala's ambassador to Panama by the new civilian government of Vinicio Cerezo. The Grupo de Apoyo Mutuo accused him of human rights abuses and attempted to bring him to trial, but his diplomatic appointment made him immune from prosecution. During the 1988 confrontation between Manuel Noriega and the United States, Cerezo frequently recalled Lobos Zamora to Guatemala to provide updates and discuss the situation; the Guatemalan government paid close attention to the situation and sought to act as a mediator between Panama and the United States.
