= Vinicio Cerezo =

President of Guatemala from 1986 to 1991

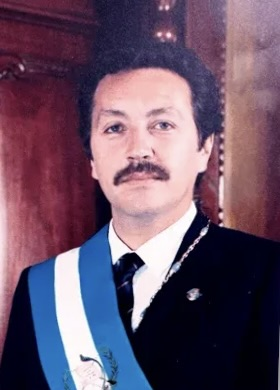
- Official portrait, 1986

40th President of Guatemala
- In office 14 January 1986 – 14 January 1991
- Vice President: Roberto Carpio Nicolle
- Preceded by: Óscar Humberto Mejía
- Succeeded by: Jorge Serrano Elías

General Secretary of Central American Integration System
- In office 29 June 2017 – 29 June 2021
- Preceded by: Victoria Marina Velásquez
- Succeeded by: Werner Vargas Torres

Personal details
- Born: 26 December 1942 (age 83) Guatemala City
- Party: Guatemalan Christian Democrats
- Spouse: Raquel Blandón (m. 1965; div. 2006)

Marco Vinicio Cerezo Arévalo (born 26 December 1942) is a Guatemalan politician who served as the 40th President of Guatemala from 1986 to 1991. He also served as the Secretary General of the Central American Integration System (SICA) from 2017 to 2021.

His tenure as President of Guatemala was characterized by political instability and political corruption. There were two failed coup attempts against Arévalo.

== Career ==
Cerezo was born in Guatemala City, the son of the Supreme Court judge Marco Vinicio Cerezo Sierra, and came from a well-known liberal family. In 1962, he was a member of the student body of the Universidad de San Carlos de Guatemala (USAC), which played an important part in the national protests against the government of Miguel Ydígoras. In 1964, he joined the Guatemalan Christian Democrats (DCG), a political party banned from standing in the 1966 elections. He graduated in judicial science from USAC in 1968, the same year the DCG was formally legalized, and was made its secretary in 1970. With a very tense political situaction, Cerezo was forced to hire permanent protection from that time. In February 1981, in the worst of 3 assassination attempts, his vehicle was attacked with hand grenades and machine gun fire in the center of the capital.

In 1974, the DCG formed part of the coalition that backed General Efraín Ríos Montt for president. Amidst allegations of fraud, Ríos Montt lost to Kjell Eugenio Laugerud. Cerezo was elected a deputy in the National Congress, where the DCG, with 14 seats, became the largest party within the opposition.

In 1978 General, Ricardo Peralta Méndez, the DCG candidate, came second to Fernando Romeo Lucas García. During Lucas García's tenure, 150 members of the DCG were murdered. The three surviving members of the Congress and the party were forced into hiding, not because of a ban but in fear for their lives. Yet, Cerezo appeared at the March 1982 elections to support the opposition candidate Alejandro Maldonado Aguirre, who lost out to the official candidate Ángel Aníbal Guevara. Suspecting fraud, Maldonado, Cerezo, and their followers launched a campaign denouncing the result. The result became academic when Efraín Ríos Montt took power in a coup, which the DCG and Cerezo initially supported. When it became clear that the repression in the countryside was becoming more indiscriminate and, perhaps more importantly, that Ríos Montt was fanatically preaching an evangelical, messianic, born-again type of Christianity, Cerezo withdrew his support for the regime and demanded new elections. In 1983, General Óscar Humberto Mejía took power in another coup, which Cerezo cautiously supported. The DCG gained 21.2% of the vote in the 1984 National Congress elections and was the largest party with 20 of the 88 seats. With this success behind them, the DCG decided to postulate Cerezo for the 1985 presidential election. He began to promote the idea of talking to the United Guatemalan National Revolutionaries (URNG), an umbrella group containing the main three guerrilla groups.

== Presidency (1986–1991) ==
In the first round of the 1985 presidential elections on 3 November, Cerezo came first with 38.6% of the popular vote. In the second round on 8 December, he defeated Jorge Carpio with 68.4% of the vote. The DCG gained 51 of the 100 seats in Congress and a majority in many municipalities nationwide. He was the first democratically elected president and civilian to take office since 1966. In his inauguration, which was met with great hopes amongst the population, he promised to ensure that what he called the dark forces of the right would not be able to break the public order or the state. He vowed to change Guatemala within his first 126 days. Some of his first actions as president were to force Army Chief of Staff and suspected human rights abuser Rodolfo Lobos Zamora to retire from the military and to name Jaime Hernández Méndez as Minister of Defence, in what was described as a "test of wills" with the Army.

The response was a new wave of terror, with many extrajudicial killings being committed by Guatemalan security forces. This battle against the forces of terror operating in the country was to be the dominant theme of his rule. According to NGO Americas Watch, in 1986, 100 people a month were dying in the conflict at that time. He declared Guatemala neutral in the civil wars that were occurring in neighboring El Salvador and Nicaragua. He was a great supporter of the idea of a Central American Parliament. There were two critical conferences on Central American integration in Esquipulas—the second of which, in August 1987, established the Procedure for a firm and lasting peace, the most crucial milestone in re-establishing peace in the region.

On 11 September 1987, he established the National Commission for Reconciliation (CNR), and on 7 October, negotiations between the URNG and the government began. When they failed two days later, with the government refusing to accept the URNG's terms, Cerezo asked the United States for more military aid to further the counter-insurgency efforts of the armed forces. On 28 October, Congress passed a general political amnesty. Amidst rumors of plots and possible assassination attempts against Cerezo, many considered him powerless and ineffective. After a farcical attempt by two colonels to take power on 11 May 1988, on 19 May, an Air Force unit made a series of demands on the government, including breaking ties with pro-USSR countries and stopping any contacts with the URNG, as well as more money for better equipment and the removal of many local politicians. Cerezo admitted that he had had to submit to some of the military's demands to avoid a coup taking place. In August, there was a three-week general strike in protest against the liberalization of petrol and other fuel sources.

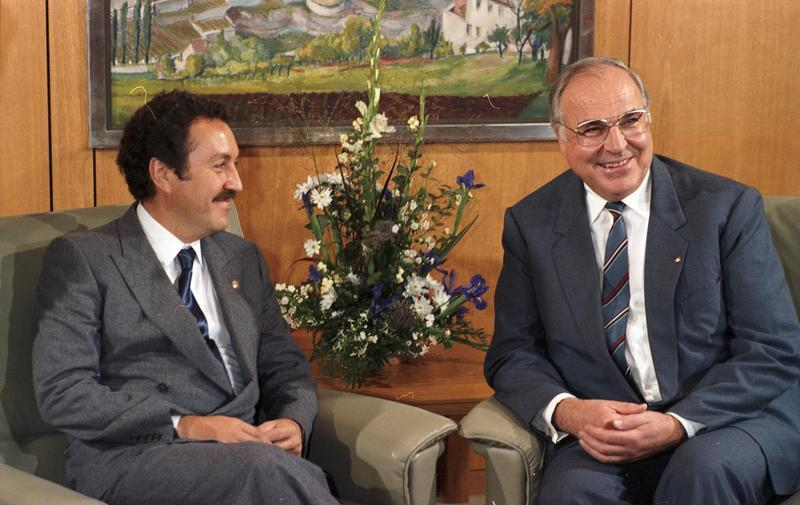
President Cerezo meeting Helmut Kohl in Bonn, 14 October 1986.

1989 saw a worsening of the political situation, with 1,600 assassinations and 800 kidnappings or disappearances in the first half of the year. These were attributed to the political violence and the covert war between suspected extrajudicial right-wing forces and the URNG. On 9 May, another attempted coup failed, and though the perpetrators were sentenced to long terms in jail that November, they were released on appeal the following January. On 1 August, DCG Secretary General Danilo Barillas was assassinated. However, on 25 August, Cerezo returned with a new promise to renovate the public administration by consolidating democracy within the 500 days he had left as president. Guatemala has remained a democracy ever since.

In May 1990, the Cerezo administration and the URNG signed an important agreement in Madrid that promised not to disturb the forthcoming elections. With this success behind him, Cerezo felt able to give a positive recapitulation of his presidency. He handed power over to his successor, Jorge Serrano, in the first democratic transition of power since 1951. The DCG performed poorly in the presidential elections, with its candidate, Alfonso Cabrera Hidalgo, not getting past the first round. Despite this, they still managed to win 27 seats in the National Congress.

That same year, as part of a thaw in Soviet–Guatemalan diplomatic relations, Cerezo invited the noted Russian linguist and epigrapher Yuri Knorozov to Guatemala to present him with a medal. Knorozov had been instrumental in the deciphering Maya hieroglyphics, and this was the first opportunity for the scholar to visit the lands and sites of the former Maya civilization.

Then, on 1 December, a troop of soldiers massacred 24 campesinos in Santiago Atitlán in the department of Sololá. In the resulting outcry, the US suspended military aid to Guatemala. Despite having supported the previous coups that led to human rights abuses in the countryside, President Cerezo claims to have stopped the massacre himself.

== Post-presidency ==
In 1991, Cerezo became a deputy in the Central American Parliament in its first five-year term. He was accused of hiding behind the immunity conferred here and in his role as an ex-president to avoid a variety of charges, including fraud in the buying of a Jordanian island, the covering up of the murder of Myrna Mack Chang, and the concession of a large piece of land to a conservation group owned by Cerezo's son Marco Vinicio Cerezo Blandón.

In the 1999 elections, the unique for which the DCG did not offer a presidential candidate, Cerezo won one of the two National Congress seats gained by his party. He was re-elected to Congress for the 2004-08 period in the November 2003 election, this time as the DCG's sole deputy.

In the 2007 general election, Cerezo lost his seat in Congress and his party gained no seats. His son, also named Vinicio Cerezo, ran for president but received less than 1% of the vote.

Vinicio Cerezo is currently building an NGO (nongovernmental organization) named Esquipulas after Esquipulas Procedure for a firm and lasting peace and a new Esquipulas conference called Esquipulas III (to follow the previous Esquipulas I and II) to further the integration of Central America, directed by Olinda Salguero. He also is a political consultant.

His appointment as Secretary-General of the Central America Integration System (SICA) was announced on 29 June 2017 during the 49th gathering in San Jose, Costa Rica. He was named Peace Ambassador by the Guatemala Government on 7 August 2017, on the anniversary of the Esquipulas II agreements.

== Honours ==
- Spain:
  - Collar of the Order of Isabella the Catholic - 1986
- Taiwan:
  - Grand Cordon of the Order of Brilliant Jade - 1989

Political offices
Preceded by Óscar Humberto Mejía	President of Guatemala; 1986–1991	Succeeded by Jorge Serrano
