= Ramiro Ponce Monroy =

Guatemalan politician (1923–2010)

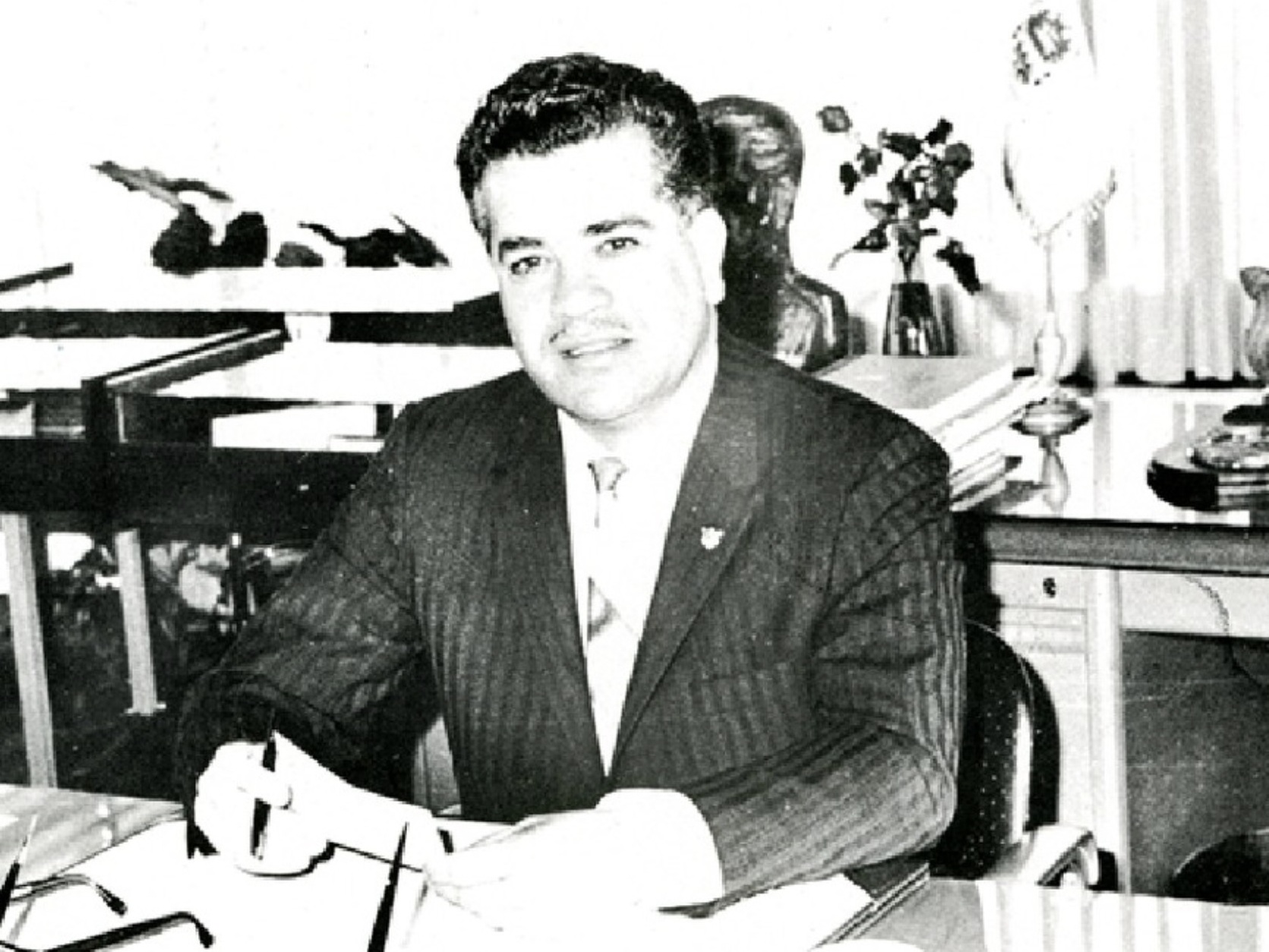

Vice President-elect of Guatemala
- In office March 13, 1982 – March 23, 1982
- Preceded by: Francisco Villagrán Kramer (in 1978)
- Succeeded by: Roberto Carpio (in 1985)

Mayor of Guatemala City
- In office June 15, 1966 – June 15, 1970
- Preceded by: Julio Maza Castellanos
- Succeeded by: Manuel Colom Argueta

Personal details
- Born: February 28, 1923 Chiquimula, Guatemala
- Died: December 25, 2010 (aged 87) Guatemala City, Guatemala

Ramiro Ponce Monroy (February 28, 1923 – December 25, 2010) was a Guatemalan politician who was vice presidential candidate of Ángel Aníbal Guevara in the 1982 presidential elections. He did not take office due to the military coup of Efraín Ríos Montt.

He served as mayor of Guatemala city from 1966 to 1970.

== Biography ==
He was born in Chiquimula in the east of Guatemala, in 1923. He was the son of Jesús Ponce Valdés and Amelia Monroy ande the oldest eight siblings.

=== Mayor of Guatemala ===
In 1966 he was elected as mayor of Guatemala City, during his administration the San Juan, Roosevelt and José Milla y Vidaurre roads were built. The name of "Jardin de la Concordia" is changed and it is reopened with the name of "Parque Enrique Gomez Carrillo", in honor of the so-called "Prince of the Chroniclers" placing for the occasion the bust sculpted by Rodolfo Galeotti Torres of the writer Enrique Gomez Carrillo. He also inaugurated the "Monument to the Mother" that was made by the Spanish sculptor José Nicolás Almansa, who gave her to the country as a sign of sympathy and love for the Guatemalan people and mother. The realization of the monument was made with funds from the municipality and was officially inaugurated on May 23 of that same year.

=== Minister of Economy ===
On May 2, 1977, he was appointed minister of Economy by the president Kjell Eugenio Laugerud García and was in office until July 1, 1978.

During that time, the production of a Guatemalan truck called "Chato 1300" was inaugurated, this happened together with President Laugerud García at the "Industrias Superior" plant in zone 13. The first car was given to the president.

=== Death ===
He death on December 25, 2010, at the age of 87, and was buried in the Las Flores Cemetery in Mixco city.
