= Héctor Mario López Fuentes =

Guatemalan general

Héctor Mario López Fuentes (7 May 1930 – 18 October 2015) was a Guatemalan general. He served as Army Chief of Staff until his replacement in 1983 by Rodolfo Lobos Zamora. In later life he held diplomatic and political roles. He was arrested in 2011 on war crimes charges but died of cancer before he could be brought to trial.

== Military, diplomatic and political career ==
López Fuentes was born on 7 May 1930. He attended the Escuela Politécnica and graduated in 1952. López Fuentes afterwards served as a supernumerary officer on the general staff for four years. From 1957 to 1961 he was an instructor at the Adolfo V. Hall Central Institute and from 1961 to 1962 served in the Presidential Honor Guard. He later served as an aide-de-camp at the Ministry of Defense and as a staff officer in Quetzaltenango. López Fuentes returned to the Honor Guard in 1966 and served as its deputy commander in 1970-71. He commanded a naval base on the Atlantic in 1971-72. During his career López Fuentes attended a number of military courses in the United States and was inducted into the Fort Leavenworth Allied Officers' Hall of Fame in 1973.

López Fuentes became Deputy Chief of the General Staff of National Defense in 1972 but held the role for only six months. He afterwards was a regional commander in Zacapa for six years. He became Deputy Chief of the Defense Staff in 1980. After the 1982 Guatemalan coup d'état by military leader Efraín Ríos Montt López Fuentes was appointed Chief of the Defense Staff. During this period his signature appears on documents relating to the mobilization of troops for Operation Sofia, against Mayan civilians as part of the Guatemalan Civil War.

López Fuentes helped lead the August 1983 coup that brought Óscar Humberto Mejía Víctores to power. He was dismissed from his role in October 1983 as he was perceived as a potential leadership threat. He served as ambassador to Italy from 1983 to 1987 and later was permanent delegate tot the UN Food and Agriculture Organization, the International Fund for Agricultural Development, the Group of Latin American and Caribbean States, the World Food Programme and the Group of 77.

López Fuentes was a candidate for the National Liberation Movement in the 1990 elections and was its presidential candidate in 1995. The party failed to win the minimum number of votes to remain registered as a political party. He afterwards disappeared from public life.

== War crimes arrest and death ==
In July 2011, López Fuentes was arrested on charges of genocide and crimes against humanity for his links to the killings of more than 300 Mayan civilians in the Ixil region during the administration of President Efrain Rios Montt. He was held at a barracks near Guatemala City for 16 days before being transferred to the Military Medical Centre for health reasons. He would spend the rest of his life in the medical center, suffering from cancer.

At the time, López Fuentes was suffering from terminal cancer and a hearing originally scheduled for October 2011 had to be delayed due to his condition. In May 2012, he was brought before Judge Miguel Ángel Gálvez of Tribunal B de Mayor Riesgo to face the charges. Gálvez rejected a motion by López' lawyer Moisés Galindo to close the tribunal on the grounds of López Fuentes' poor health. The retrial was scheduled for January 2016 but López Fuentes died on 18 October 2015, aged 85.
