= Rudy Ortiz =

Guatemalan military officer

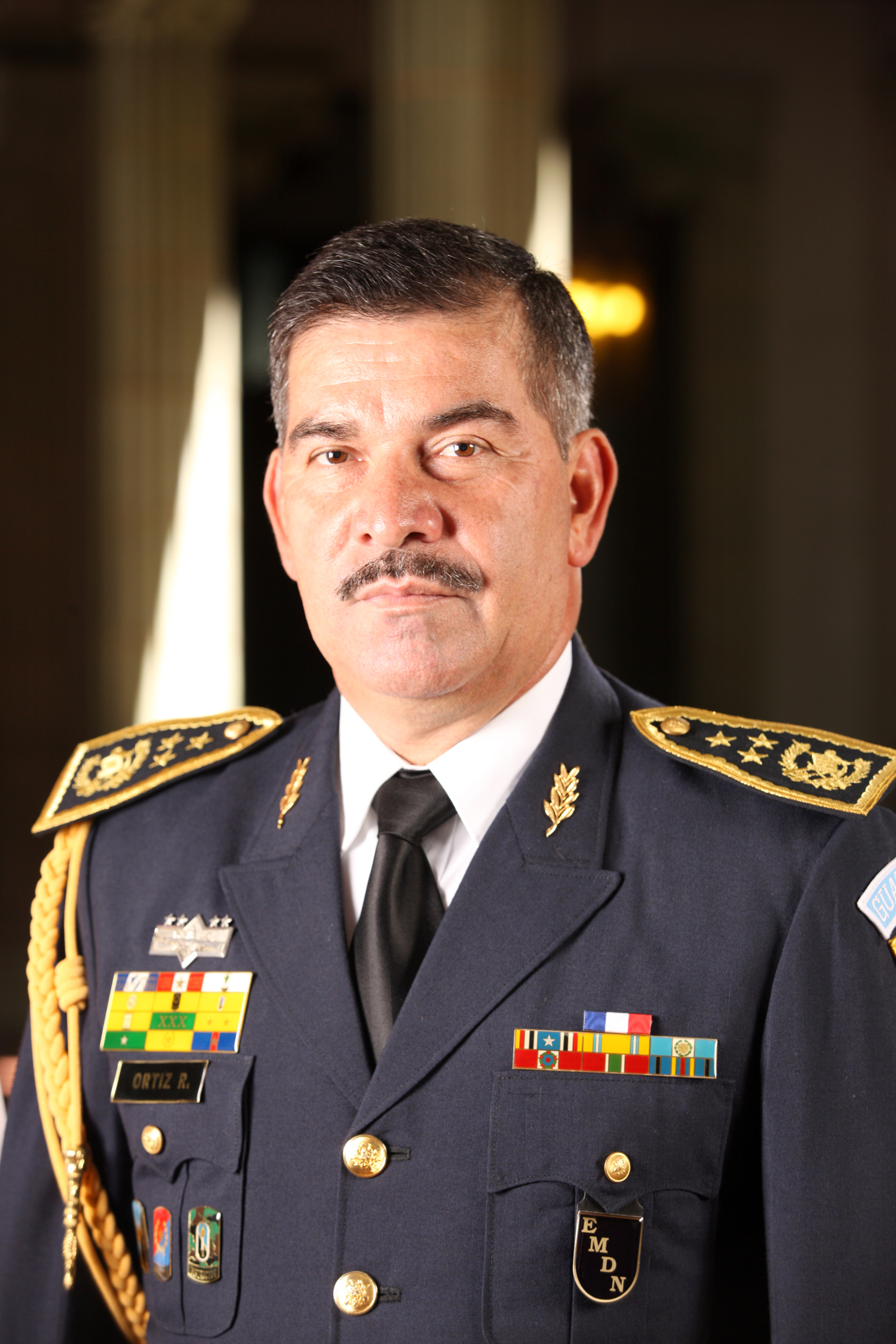
Official portrait, 2013

Rudy Israel Ortiz Ruiz (6 August 1963 – 20 August 2014) was a Guatemalan senior military officer who served as the Chief of the General Staff from 13 July 2013 until his death on 20 August 2014.

Ortiz enlisted in the Armed Forces in 1983 at the age of 20.

In late August 2014, Ortiz, along with four other senior military officers took off in a helicopter that changed its flight path during bad weather. The helicopter crashed in Huehuetenango, near the capital of Guatemala and with the border of Mexico. It is unclear if the helicopter crashed naturally or was shot down due to flying over Huehuetenango which has a strong drug cartel presence. Ortiz died at the age of 51, and the President of Guatemala gave out a statement praising all of the officers in the helicopter's dedication to the military. Ortiz was planning to retire from the Guatemalan Military in 2015. One of the victims in the helicopter crash was Brigade General Braulio René Mayen García, Commander of the 5th. Brigade of Infantry, at the moment of the accident.
