= Military ranks of Guatemala =

The Military ranks of Guatemala are the military insignia used by the Armed Forces of Guatemala.

== Commanders ==
Rank group	Leadership
	Ministro de defensa nacional	General jefe de estado mayor

== Commissioned officer ranks ==
The rank insignia of commissioned officers.

Rank group	General / flag officers		Senior officers			Junior officers
Guatemalan Army
Guatemalan Army	General de división	General de brigada	Coronel	Teniente coronel	Mayor	Capitán primero	Capitán segundo	Teniente	Subteniente
Guatemalan Navy
Guatemalan Navy	Almirante	Vicealmirante	Capitán de navío	Capitán de fragata	Capitán de corbeta	Teniente de navio	Teniente de fragata	Alférez de navio	Alférez de fragata
Guatemalan Air Force
Guatemalan Air Force	General de división	General de brigada	Coronel	Teniente coronel	Mayor	Capitán primero	Capitán segundo	Teniente	Subteniente
Rank group	General / flag officers		Senior officers			Junior officers

== Other ranks ==
The rank insignia of non-commissioned officers and enlisted personnel.

Rank group	Senior NCOs				Junior NCOs	Enlisted
Guatemalan Army							No insignia
Guatemalan Army	Sargento mayor	Sargento técnico	Sargento primero	Sargento segundo	Cabo	Soldado de primera	Soldado
Guatemalan Navy
Guatemalan Navy	Maestre mayor	Maestre técnico	Maestre especialista	Contra maestre	Marinero de primera	Marinero de segundo	Marinero de tercera
Guatemalan Air Force							No insignia
Guatemalan Air Force	Sargento mayor	Sargento técnico	Sargento primero	Sargento segundo	Cabo	Soldado de primera	Soldado
Rank group	Senior NCOs				Junior NCOs	Enlisted
