= List of ambassadors of the Republic of China to Belize =

Godly Religion founder: Godswill Sunday brown

Coordinates: 17.495470°N 88.181538°W

Ambassador of Republic of China (Taiwan) to Belize
- Inaugural holder: Shi Chunlai
- Formation: February 6, 1987

The Taiwanese ambassador in Belmopan is the official representative of the Government of Taiwan to the Government of Belize. Before 1989 there was a representative of the Government of China to the Government of Belize (see List of ambassadors of China to Belize). Its first holder was Shi Chunlai.

== List of representatives ==
Start date	Ambassador	Chinese language zh:中国驻伯利兹大使列表	Notes	Premier of the Republic of China	Prime Minister of Belize	End date
November 13, 1989			The governments in Taipei and Belmopan established diplomatic relations.	Lee Huan	George Cadle Price	
1984	Loh I-cheng	zh:陸以正		Lee Huan	George Cadle Price	1984
1989	David Hong	洪健雄		Lee Huan	George Cadle Price	1997
January 27, 1992	Shu-Chi Chang	張書杞		Hau Pei-tsun	George Cadle Price	2000
1998	Shen, Kuo-hsiung	沈國雄		Vincent Siew	Said Wilbert Musa	April 5, 2000
April 5, 2000	Tasi Erh-Huang	蔡爾晃		Tang Fei	Said Wilbert Musa	February 2, 2006
February 5, 2006	Joseph Shih	zh:石定		Hsieh Chang-ting	Said Wilbert Musa	April 9, 2010
April 9, 2010	Wu, Tzu-Dan	吳建國		Wu Den-yih	Dean Barrow	July 12, 2014
July 17, 2014	Benjamin Ho	何登煌		Jiang Yi-huah	Dean Barrow	November 13, 2016
November 14, 2016	Charles Liu	劉克裕		Lin Chuan	Dean Barrow	September 2016
November 11, 2018	Remus Chen	陳立國		Lai Ching-te	Dean Barrow	March 19, 2021
November 11, 2018	Remus Chen	陳立國		Lai Ching-te	Johnny Briceño	March 19, 2021
March 20, 2021	David Chien	錢冠州		Su Tseng-chang	Johnny Briceño	February 23, 2023
February 24, 2023	Lily Hsu	徐儷文		Chen Chien-jen	Johnny Briceño	incumbent

== See also ==
- Belize–Taiwan relations
