= Belize–Taiwan relations =

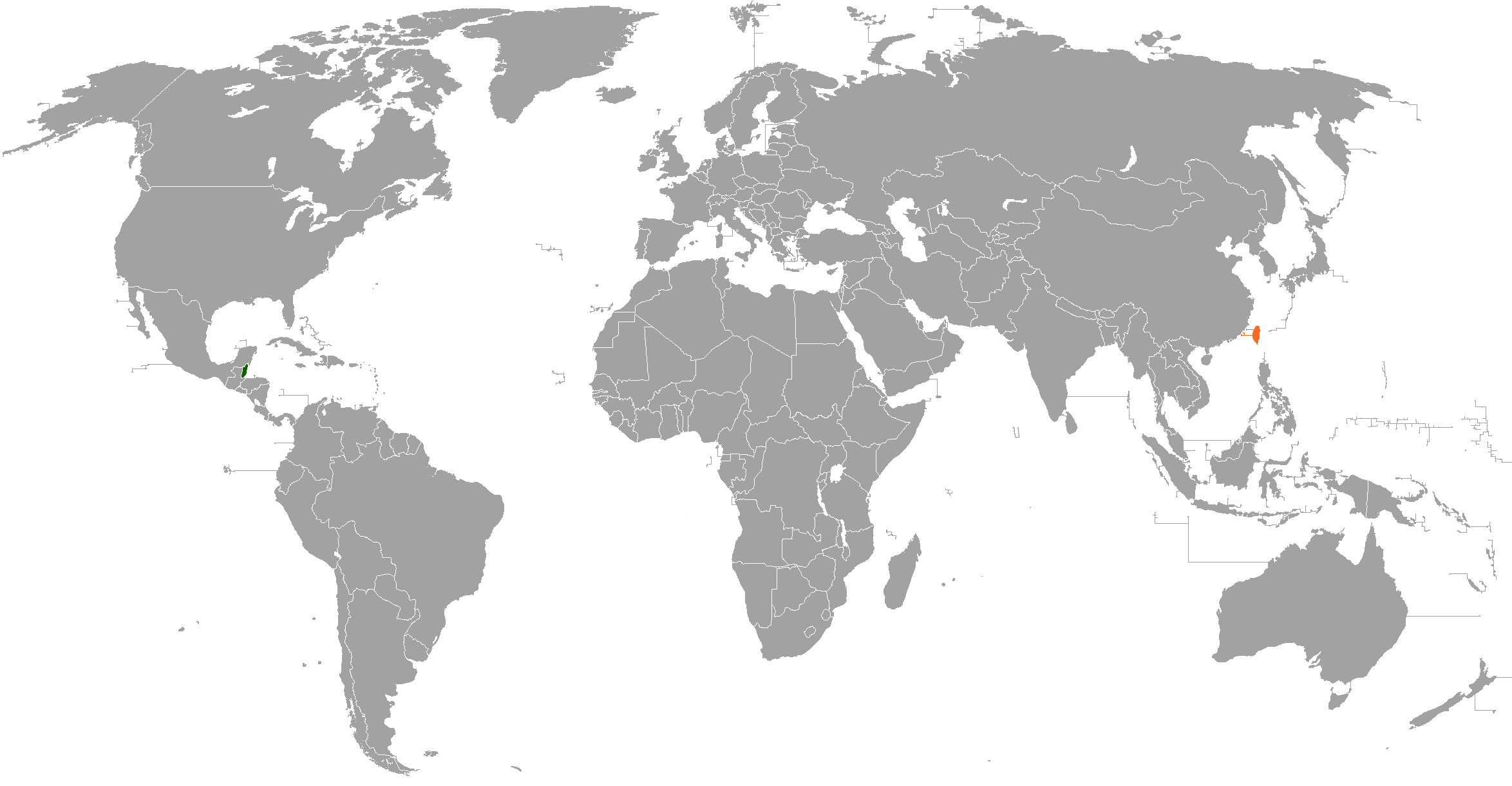

- Belize: Taiwan

Diplomatic mission
- Embassy of Belize to Taiwan: Embassy of Taiwan to Belize

Envoy
- Ambassador Candice Pitts: Ambassador Lily Li-Wen Hsu

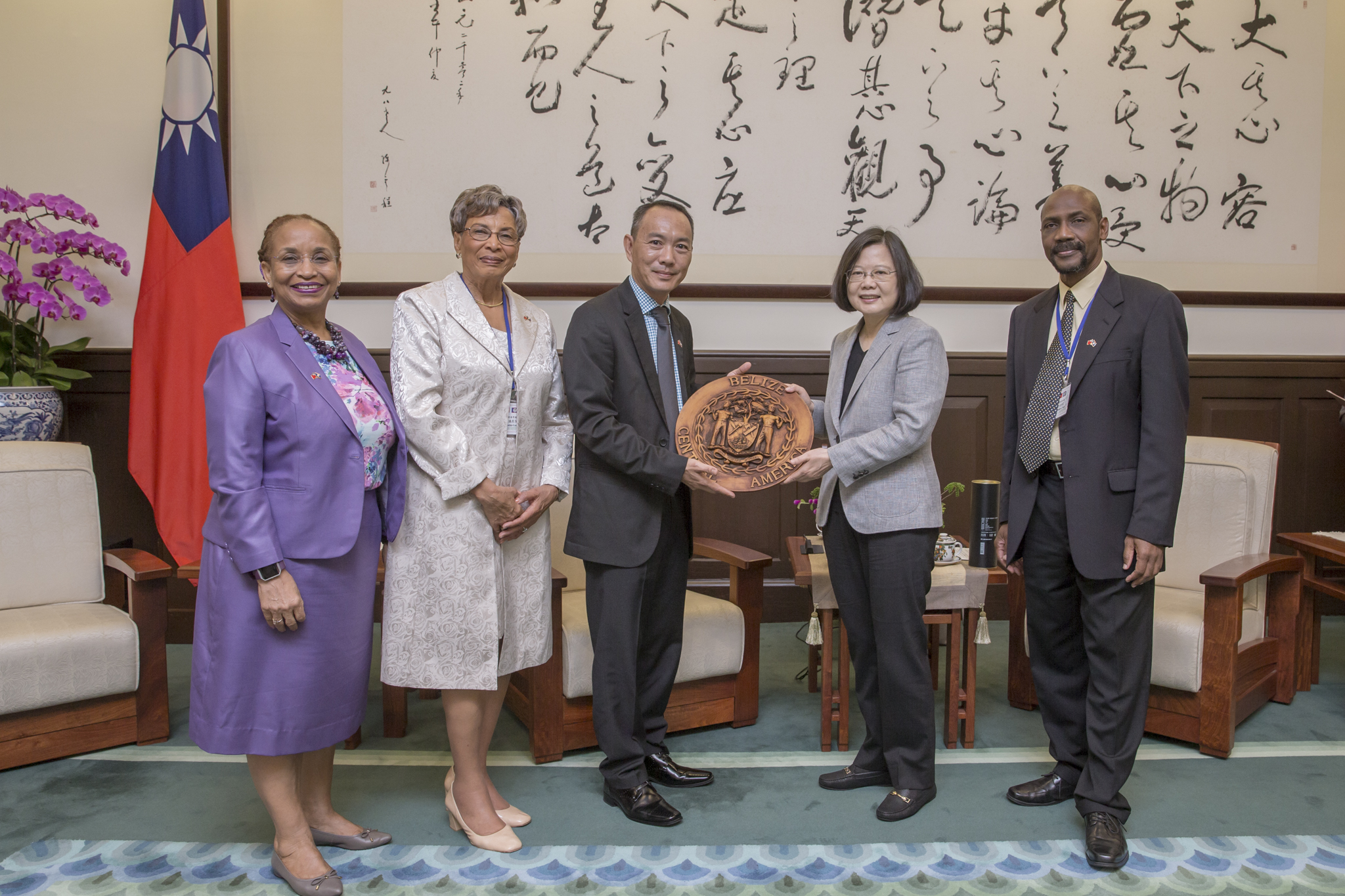
Belize Senate President Lee Mark Chang and Republic of China President Tsai Ing-wen.

Bilateral relations between Belize and Republic of China (Taiwan) have been maintained since 1989. Belize is one of the few countries that recognizes Taiwan as a country, and consequently lacks diplomatic ties with the People's Republic of China (PRC) on the mainland.

== History ==
Belize gained independence in 1981. William Quinto, a Belizean businessman of Chinese descent and a supporter of Belize's People's United Party, began lobbying then-Prime Minister George Price via his mutual acquaintance Said Musa for Belize to establish relations with Taiwan in the 1980s. Then-Taiwanese ambassador to Guatemala Gene Loh came to Belize in May 1984 and met with Quinto and Price to discuss the possibility of establishing relations, but Guatemalan leader Rodolfo Lobos Zamora objected, and after Manuel Esquivel of the Belizean opposition United Democratic Party took power in the election late that year, the plans were put aside. In the coming years, Quinto would put up the funds for Musa (by then Minister of Education), Minister of Foreign Affairs Harry Courtney, and Vice Minister Robert Leslie to go to Japan and Hong Kong in order to meet with Loh again.

It would not be until after the 1989 election when the PUP regained power that Belize and Taiwan established relations. Belize hoped to attract foreign capital and explore new market opportunities. At that point, Belize only had three overseas missions, in London, Washington DC, and at the United Nations in New York City; Musa, who by then had become Minister of Foreign Affairs, told Quinto that if he did not go to Taipei to fill the position of ambassador, there would be no one else to take the job, and thus he went. Belize also established diplomatic relations with the PRC between 1987 and 1989, but the PRC rescinded its diplomatic relations when it began its One China Policy. Quinto remained Belize's ambassador to Taiwan until 2008, when he retired. His subordinate, chargé d'affaires Efrain R. Novelo, was promoted to full ambassadorial rank to replace him.

Since opening diplomatic relations with Taiwan, Belize has received a large amount of economic aid and development assistance projects from Taiwan's International Cooperation and Development Fund. Taiwan owns 10% of Belize's external debt and has signed a 60-million-dollar cooperation agreement.

In 2021, Taiwan and Belize signed a mutual assistance treaty that would serve as a framework to legal cooperation between the two countries.

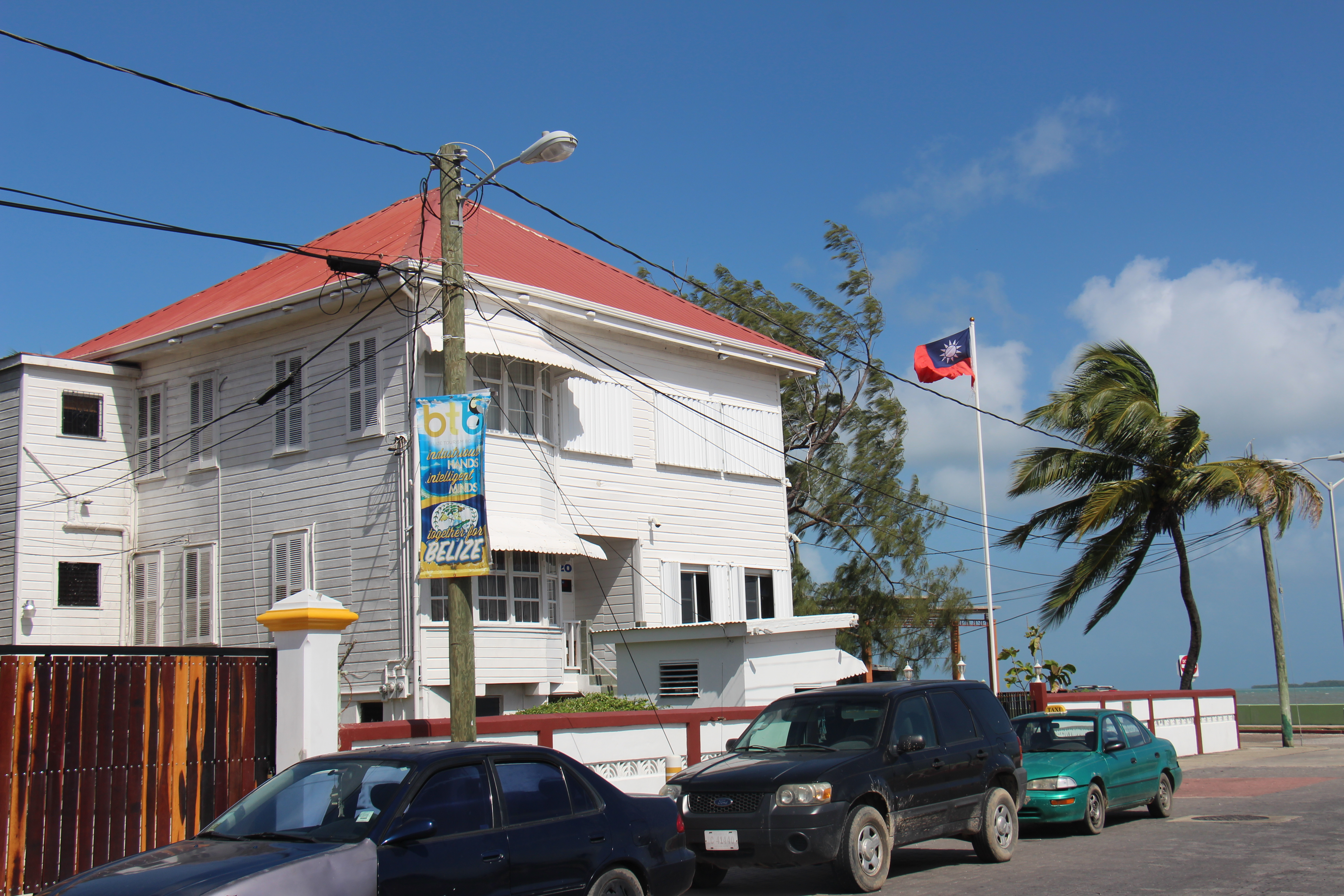
Embassy of Taiwan in Belize City

== Resident diplomatic missions ==
- Belize has an embassy in Taipei.
- Taiwan has an embassy in Belize City.

== See also ==
- Taiwan–Caribbean relations
- List of ambassadors of the Republic of China to Belize
