= H. K. Yang =

Taiwanese diplomat (1910–2000)

Yang Hsi-kun (Chinese: 楊西崑; pinyin: Yáng Xīkūn, 1910–2000), also spelled Yang Hsi-kung and better known as H. K. Yang, was a diplomat of the Republic of China on Taiwan.

== Biography ==
Yang, a native of Jiangsu in mainland China, attended Peking University in Beijing and Columbia University in New York City.

From 1969 to 1979, Yang served as vice foreign minister and then deputy foreign minister of the Republic of China, and was responsible for the establishment of the Department of African Affairs. After Taipei's expulsion from the United Nations in 1971, Yang proposed to then-president Chiang Kai-shek that his government should in response declare a "Chinese Republic of Taiwan" that was entirely separate from the mainland; the descriptor "Chinese" — in the original, "Zhōnghuá" (中華) and not "Zhōngguó" (中國)" — was intended solely as a cultural descriptor rather than a political one, analogous to the various "Arab Republics" of the Middle East and North Africa. In conversations with then U.S. Ambassador in Taipei Walter P. McConaughy, Yang stated that Chiang himself was "impressively open-minded and willing to listen" to the suggestion, but Chiang's wife Soong Mei-ling in contrast had extremely negative reactions; Yang speculated that her opinion was influenced by Kung Ling-kan (孔令侃), the son of H. H. Kung and Soong's elder sister Soong Ai-ling, and spoke derogatorily of the younger Kung as "waging a reactionary campaign" while enjoying "the security of his New York residence".

After the end of Yang's term as deputy foreign minister in 1979, he became Taipei's ambassador in Pretoria, South Africa; he served in that position until 1989, when he was succeeded by Gene Loh. That year, he received an honorary doctorate from the University of Pretoria. His work earned him the nickname "Mr. Africa" both from African leaders and from Taiwan's media.

== Quotes ==
- "South Africa and my country are joined in the fight against communism. We are in favour of free enterprise, democracy and freedom." —in 1986 remarks quoted by Business Day

== Notes ==
Diplomatic posts
Preceded by ?	Ambassador of the Republic of China to the Republic of South Africa; 1979–1989	Succeeded by Gene Loh
