= Chinese people in Belize =

Ethnic group

Ethnic Chinese in Belize
Total population
- 9,990 (2022 census)

Regions with significant populations
- Belize District

Languages
- English · Kriol · Chinese · Spanish

Religion
- Buddhism · Chinese folk religion (incld. Confucianism and Taoism) · Catholicism · Protestantism

Related ethnic groups
- Chinese Caribbeans

The Chinese community in Belize consists of descendants of Han Chinese immigrants who were brought to British Honduras as indentured labourers as well as recent immigrants from mainland China and Taiwan.

== History ==
=== Early history ===
The importation of Chinese workers to British Honduras was a response to economic shifts in the mid-19th century. As logwood and mahogany production declined, sugarcane plantations became of increasing importance. Recruitment of workers from China was facilitated by the colonial governor John Gardiner Austin, who had previously served as a labour broker in Xiamen, Fujian on China's southeast coast. 474 Chinese workers thus arrived in British Honduras in 1865. They were sent to the north of the colony, but were reassigned to central and southern areas beginning in 1866 due to the large numbers of deaths and abscondments. By 1869, only 211 remained accounted for; 108 had died, while another 155 had sought refuge with the native peoples at Chan Santa Cruz. Many of the deaths were due to suicide in response to horrifying working conditions.

More Chinese laborers migrated to Belize in the early 20th century. The second largest batch came just before the outbreak of World War II, when they traveled to the United States from where they gradually trickled southward by land to Mexico and Central America. The Chinese were originally brought to Belize as indentured servants and/or slaves.

=== Late 20th century ===
Belize's citizenship-by-investment programme, which began in 1986, was a popular option among Chinese migrants in the 1990s. In response to the demand, the price rose from US$25,000 to US$50,000 in 1997. Hong Kong migrants, who lacked real British citizenship but only had British National (Overseas) status, sought to obtain Belizean passports as an insurance policy in case conditions in their homeland went downhill after the 1997 resumption of sovereignty by China. Mainland Chinese migrants, for their part, sought to use Belize as a stepping stone to get around tough U.S. migration policy against them; however, the U.S. tightened up its visa requirements for Belizeans in response. Migrants from Taiwan also took advantage of this programme. Among migrants from Taiwan it was especially popular to bring aged relatives to settle in Belize.

Not all of the migrants returned to their homeland or went on to the U.S.; some settled in the Belize River on the tracts of land that the government granted them in exchange for their investments, bringing in workers to building houses and schools. In the mid-1990s there may have been as many as six or seven thousand Chinese people in Belize. However, when the government tightened its work permit policies, an exodus began—the migrants went to other Chinese communities in Costa Rica, Thailand and the Philippines where migration policies were more favourable. By 1998 the Chinese were estimated to have fallen to about 1.5% of the Belizean population or three thousand people. Corozal for example was reported to have had a peak Chinese population of 500, but then fell to just one-tenth that.

== Business and employment ==
In the 19th century, during the Caste War in neighbouring Yucatán, Mexico, Chinese and Lebanese shopkeepers began setting up businesses in Belize City. A hardware store run by a Chinese migrant named Augusto Quan was well known as the only supplier of certain tools, nails and buckets for a long time. Others established laundries, brothels, gambling houses, and restaurants. Today the Chinese community are active in the grocery, restaurant, fast food, and lottery trades.

== Demography ==
The 2000 census found 1,716 Chinese people (0.7% of the population) living in the country, and 1,607 people speaking Chinese as their first language. Chinese are an overwhelmingly urban population, with five-sixths living in cities, the highest proportion out of all tabulated ethnic groups. This is a slightly higher proportion than Garifuna people and Creoles, but contrasted sharply with East Indians, of whom roughly half live in rural areas. The majority live in Belize City (988 people) and Cayo District wherein lies the capital Belmopan (351 people). Compared to other ethnic groups their median level of education is higher, with 46% having completed secondary education, a proportion second only to Africans and Caucasians, similar to that of Spanish people, and more than double that of Creoles, Garifuna people, East Indians, and other ethnic groups; however, relatively few (12%) go on to tertiary education. Despite efforts to hire Chinese interpreters for the census, the Central Statistical Office indicated in an official report that many Chinese migrants, like other foreign-born persons, did not respond to the census and thus were undercounted. The language barrier may have been compounded by the fact that illegal immigrants' unwillingness to participate in the census for fear that the information they provided could be used for law enforcement; however this may have been ameliorated somewhat by an immigration amnesty in 1999.

The 2010 census did not break out Chinese separately, but recorded 2,823 "Asians" (a separate category from "East Indians").

== Culture ==
Unusual naming customs arose among Chinese people in Belize. Indentured migrants were assigned identifying numbers, which were sometimes used in place of names. Workers sometimes traded numbers or misused numbers of deceased fellows to obtain extra rations. After they had filled their indenture contracts, they had to register their own names. Some used approximations of their Chinese names, some took on English given names while keeping Chinese surnames, while others (especially those who had remigrated from Guatemala) had Spanish translations of their Chinese surnames.

The most important festival for the Chinese community is Lunar New Year, which falls on the first day of the first lunar month. Lion dances, accompanied by cymbals, drums, gongs, and firecrackers are a common sight during these festivities.

For a majority of the Chinese, religion is a mixture of all the various Chinese philosophies. The older generation, especially the women, continue to practice an abbreviated form of ancestor worship and Buddhism, while most of their children born in Belize have adopted Catholicism consequent upon their Catholic education.

== Organisations ==
Community organisations include the Belize Chinese Association, which conducts Chinese New Year gatherings. Its former president Lee Mark Chang has also been active in speaking out against crime committed against Chinese businesspeople, and responding to accusations that the businesspeople themselves bear responsibility for the crime because they do not provide employment opportunities to local people. In 2010, the BCA organised a nationwide shutdown of Chinese shops in response to the murder of 14-year-old Hellen Yu, a local-born girl of Chinese descent, during a robbery of her parents shop; BCA secretary Eric Chang expressed disappointment at other Belizeans' indifference to the murder. In 2011, the BCA and the Taiwanese Chamber of Commerce organised joint street protests in response to the murder of two Chinese women. New BCA president Edmund Quan was quoted as stating that his organisation would submit requests to the authorities for amendments of relevant criminal laws.

== Community relations ==
Racism in Belize is directed by Belizean Creole people against both the indigenous Maya people of Belize as well as recent migrants such as the Chinese. Along with mestizos, Chinese, as a visible minority, are highly vulnerable to being targeted for exclusion from society. Chinese themselves are often reluctant to integrate into local society, preferring to maintain their own institutions and social circles. The prevalence of robberies against Chinese shopkeepers has also contributed to poor relations between Chinese and Creoles; many of these robberies are believed to be committed by Creole gangs. Even the iron window bars which Chinese merchants use to protect their businesses from burglary are seen as a symbol of their desire to remain aloof from Belizean society. Resentment at the commercial success of Asians (both East Indians and Chinese) is also widespread, especially because they run family businesses which rarely offer employment opportunities to outsiders. Few learn to speak the Belizean Kriol language. Chinese people's extensive use of the economic citizenship programme has also proven to be controversial among local people.

== Notable people ==
- Lee Mark Chang, President pro tempore of the Senate of Belize
- William Quinto, the pioneer of Belize–Taiwan relations

== See also ==
- Chinese Caribbean
- Belize–Taiwan relations

== Bibliography ==
- Meagher, Arnold J. (2008), The coolie trade: the traffic in Chinese laborers to Latin America 1847-1874, Xlibris Corporation, ISBN 9781436309431
- Mwakikagile, Godfrey (2010), Belize and Its People: Life in a Multicultural Society, Continental Press, ISBN 9789987932214
- Robinson, St. John (2010), "The Chinese of Central America: Diverse Beginnings, Common Achievements", in Look Lai, Walton; Tan, Chee Beng (eds.), The Chinese in Latin America and the Caribbean, Brill, ISBN 9789004182134
- Sutherland, Anne (1998), The making of Belize: globalization in the margins, Greenwood Publishing Group, ISBN 9780897895798
- Population Census 2000: Major Findings (PDF), Central Statistical Office, 2007
- Main Results of 2010 Housing and Population Census (PDF), Central Statistics Office, 2010, archived from the original (PDF) on June 11, 2012
