= William Quinto =

Belizean diplomat

William Quinto MBE (born 1937) is a Belizean diplomat. From 1990 to 2008 he served as Belize's ambassador to the Republic of China, resident in Taipei, Taiwan; he uses the Chinese name Wu Yong-chuan (Chinese: 伍永泉).

== Career ==
Quinto, a businessman and a People's United Party supporter, by the early 1980s had long been acquainted with Said Musa, who was a legal consultant for his company. He began lobbying then-Prime Minister George Price for Belize to establish relations with Taiwan in those years. Then-ROC ambassador to Guatemala Gene Loh came to Belize in May 1984 and met with Quinto and Price to discuss the possibility of establishing relations, but Guatemalan leader Rodolfo Lobos Zamora objected, and after Manuel Esquivel of the opposing United Democratic Party of Belize took power in election late that year, the plans were put aside. In the coming years, Quinto would put up the funds for Musa (by then Minister of Education), Minister of Foreign Affairs Harry Courtney, and Vice Minister Robert Leslie to go to Japan and Hong Kong in order to meet with Loh again. However, it would not be until after the 1989 election when the PUP regained power that Belize and the ROC established relations. At that point, Belize only had three overseas missions, in London, Washington DC, and at the United Nations in New York City; Musa, who by then had become Minister of Foreign Affairs, told Quinto that if he did not go to Taipei to fill the position of ambassador, there would be no one else to take the job, and thus he went.

Soon after Quinto arrived in Taipei, UDP politician Dean Barrow began promoting Belize's citizenship by investment program, which led to some strain in relations when the ROC decided to impose visa requirements on Belizean passport holders in response. In 2001, Quinto he was part of a group of six Central American diplomats who complained to then-Mayor of Taipei Ma Ying-jeou about the difficulties of finding parking in the city and requested their diplomatic immunity to be extended to violations of parking laws. His tenure of seventeen years, six months in Taipei made him the "dean" of the diplomatic corps there. In 2008, at the age of 71 and with the fall from power of his ally Musa in the election that year, he decided it was time to retire and return to Belize. After his departure, his subordinate, chargé d'affaires Efrain R. Novelo, was promoted to full ambassadorial rank to replace him.

== Personal life ==
Quinto is of Chinese descent; his father migrated to Belize in the early 20th century, and got his start as an importer of dry goods before switching to the more profitable tobacco and alcohol, in which he made his fortune. Quinto was named a Member of the Most Excellent Order of the British Empire in December 1989. On the occasion of his departure from Taiwan in 2008, President Chen Shui-bian conferred upon him the Grand Cordon of the Order of Brilliant Star (大綬景星勳章, a civilian order of the Republic of China). Two of Quinto's sons, David and Jimmy, are businessmen in Belize City. Another son, William, studied at Dulles High School in Sugar Land, Texas, and lived in a two-story mansion with a wrap-around balcony and an indoor pool which his father owned there; one time while his father was away, he held a party there which ended up getting raided by police; the incident provoked local political attention because the son of ex-mayor Dean A. Hrbacek had attended.
