= 1982 Guatemalan general election =

- 7 March 1982
- Presidential election
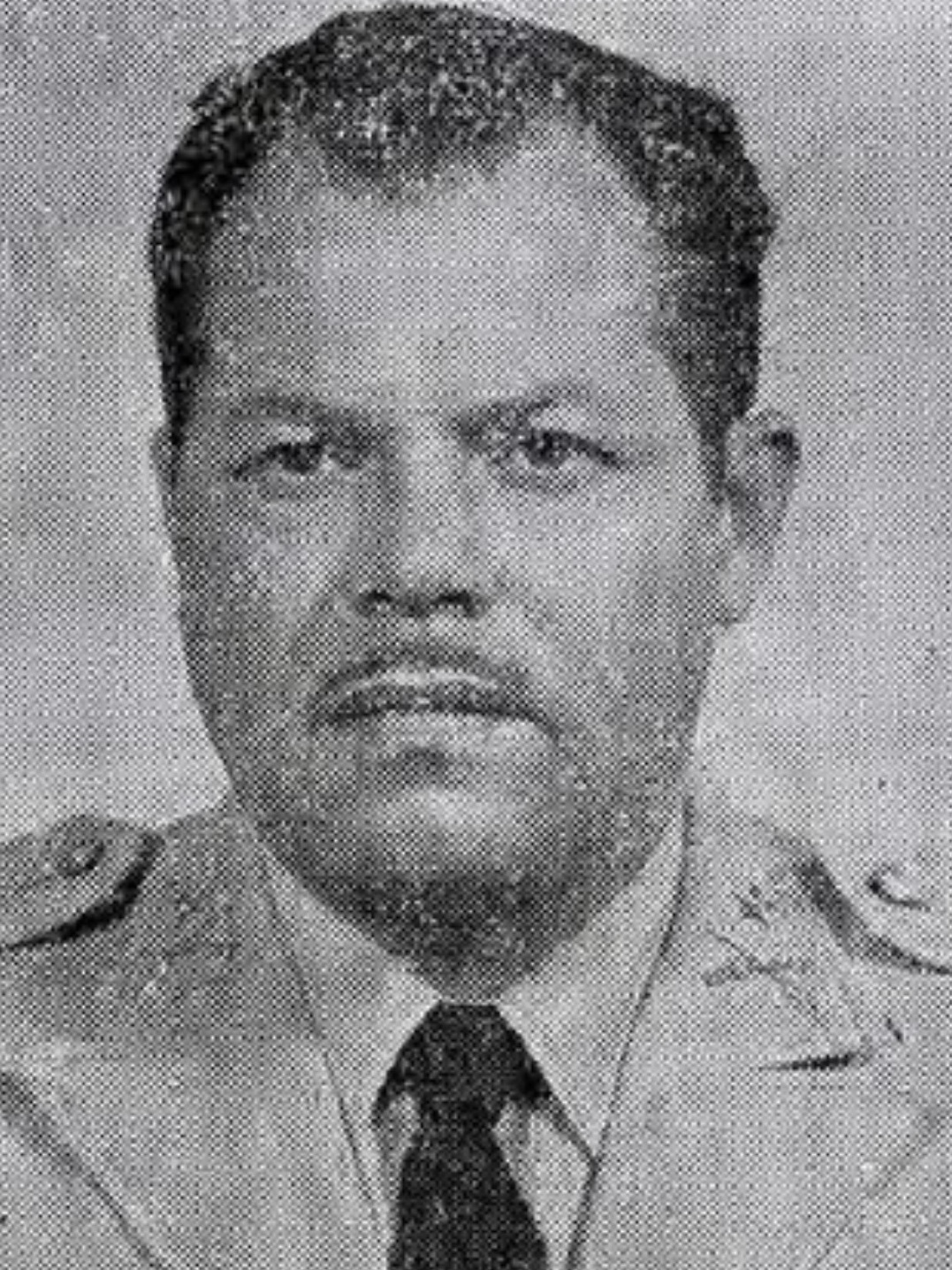

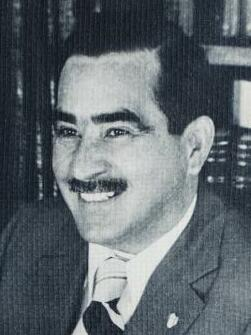
Nominee	Aníbal Guevara	Mario Sandoval
Party	FPD	MLN
Running mate	Ramiro Ponce	Leonel Sisniega
Electoral vote	34	0
Popular vote	379,051	275,487
Percentage	38.86%	28.24%
President before election
Romeo Lucas García
PID-PR-CAO
President after election
Results annulled
(Ángel Aníbal Guevara overthrown by military junta)

General elections were held in Guatemala on 7 March 1982. Ángel Aníbal Guevara, hand-picked successor of previous president Romeo Lucas García, was declared the winner of the presidential election and was scheduled to take office on 1 July. However, the elections were widely denounced as fraudulent by elements on both sides of the political spectrum and an army-led coup d'état on 23 March instead installed the three-man junta of General Efraín Ríos Montt, General Horacio Maldonado Schaad, and Colonel Francisco Luis Gordillo Martínez.

Voter turnout was 45.83% in the presidential election.

== Results ==
=== President ===
Ángel Aníbal Guevara was the candidate of the Popular Democratic Front, an alliance of the Institutional Democratic Party, the Revolutionary Party and the National Unity Front. Alejandro Maldonado Aguirre was the candidate of the National Opposition Union, an alliance of Guatemalan Christian Democracy and the National Renewal Party.

Candidate	Party	Votes	%
Ángel Aníbal Guevara	Popular Democratic Front	379,051	38.86
Mario Sandoval Alarcón	National Liberation Movement	275,487	28.24
Alejandro Maldonado Aguirre	National Opposition Union	221,810	22.74
Gustavo Anzueto Vielnam	Nationalist Authentic Centre	99,047	10.15
Total		975,395	100.00
Valid votes		975,395	90.37
Invalid/blank votes		103,997	9.63
Total votes		1,079,392	100.00
Registered voters/turnout		2,355,064	45.83
Source: Nohlen

=== Congress ===
Of the nine seats won by the National Opposition Union, seven were taken by Guatemalan Christian Democracy and two by the National Renewal Party.

Party	Seats	+/–
Popular Democratic Front	33	+2
National Liberation Movement	21	+1
National Opposition Union	9	+2
Nationalist Authentic Centre	3	New
Total	66	+5
Source: Nohlen

== Bibliography ==
- Villagrán Kramer, Francisco. Biografía política de Guatemala: años de guerra y años de paz. FLACSO-Guatemala, 2004.
- Political handbook of the world 1982. New York, 1983.
