= 1999 Guatemalan constitutional referendum =

A constitutional referendum was held in Guatemala on 16 May 1999. It featured four questions; one on defining the nation and social rights (including those of the indigenous population, workers, military service and an expansion of the social security system) one on reforming Congress, one on reforming the executive (including redefining the role of the military) and one on reforming the judiciary. All four were rejected by voters, although turnout was just 18.6%.

== Results ==
=== Definition of the nation and social rights ===
Choice	Votes	%
For	327,854	43.2
Against	366,591	48.3
Invalid/blank votes		-
Total	757,940	100
Source: Nohlen

=== Reform of Congress ===
Choice	Votes	%
For	284,423	42.0
Against	392,223	58.0
Invalid/blank votes		-
Total	757,940	100
Source: Nohlen

=== Reform of the Executive ===
Choice	Votes	%
For	294,849	42.9
Against	392,223	57.1
Invalid/blank votes		-
Total	757,940	100
Source: Nohlen

=== Reform of the Judiciary ===
Choice	Votes	%
For	315,565	45.8
Against	373,025	54.2
Invalid/blank votes		-
Total	757,940	100
Source: Nohlen
