= Chief of the General Staff (Guatemala) =

Highest ranking position in the Armed Forces of Guatemala

- Jefe del Estado Mayor
- Shoulder rank insignia for the Chief of the General Staff

- Incumbent; José Giovani Martínez Milián since 1 December 2025
- Reports to: Minister of National Defense
- Formation: 14 November 1890
- Deputy: Deputy Chief of the General Staff
- Website: Official website

The Chief of the General Staff (Spanish: Jefe del Estado Mayor) is the professional head of the Guatemalan Armed Forces. They are responsible for the administration and operational control of the military. It is the highest achievable commissioned officer rank that may be attained in the Guatemalan Armed Forces.

== List of officeholders ==
=== General Staff (14 November 1890–12 June 1930) ===
- ?

=== Army Staff (12 June 1930–5 September 1968) ===
- ?

=== General Staff of the Army (5 September 1968–23 March 1983) ===
No.	Portrait	Name (birth–death)	Term of office		
No.	Portrait	Name (birth–death)	Took office	Left office	Time in office
1		Brigadier general Kjell Eugenio Laugerud García (1930–2009)	July 1970	July 1972	2 years
2		Brigadier general Fausto David Rubio Coronado	July 1972	January 1973	6 months
3		Brigadier general Efraín Ríos Montt (1926–2018)	January 1973	April 1973	3 months
4		Brigadier general Fernando Romeo Lucas García (1924–2006)	July 1973	July 1976	3 years
5		Otto Guillermo Spliegler Noriega	July 1976	February 1977	7 months
6		Divisional general David Cancinos Barrios (1920–1979)	February 1977	11 June 1979	2 years, 4 months
7		Ángel Aníbal Guevara (born 1924)	June 1979	January 1980	7 months
8		Luís René Mendoza Palomo	January 1980	June 1981	1 year, 5 months
9		Manuel Benedicto Lucas García	15 August 1981	24 March 1982	6 months
10		Héctor Mario López Fuentes (1930–2015)	March 1982	October 1983	1 year, 6 months

=== National Defense Staff (23 March 1983–present) ===
Portrait	Name (birth–death)	Term of office			Defence branch	Ref.
Portrait	Name (birth–death)	Took office	Left office	Time in office	Defence branch	Ref.
	Divisional general Rodolfo Lobos Zamora	October 1983	September 1985	1 year, 11 months	Guatemalan Army	
	Brigadier general Héctor Gramajo (1940–2004)	January 1986	February 1987	1 year, 1 month	Guatemalan Army	
	Brigadier general Hellmuth René Casados Ramírez	14 January 2012	4 June 2013	1 year, 141 days	Guatemalan Army	
	Divisional general Manuel Augusto López Ambrocio	4 June 2013	16 July 2013	42 days	Guatemalan Army	
	Divisional general Rudy Ortiz (1963–2014)	16 July 2013	20 August 2014 †	1 year, 35 days	Guatemalan Air Force	
	Divisional general Carlos Eduardo Estrada Pérez (born 1936)	27 August 2014	31 July 2015	338 days	Guatemalan Army	
	Brigadier general Alfredo Sosa Díaz	31 July 2015	22 January 2016	175 days	Guatemalan Army	
	Divisional general Juan Manuel Pérez Ramírez	22 January 2016	1 August 2017	1 year, 191 days	Guatemalan Army	
	Divisional general Erick Cano Zamora	1 August 2017	6 March 2018	217 days	Guatemalan Army	
	Divisional general Julio César Paz Bone (born 1966)	6 March 2018	21 June 2019	1 year, 107 days	Guatemalan Air Force	
	Divisional general Albin Enrique Dubois	20 June 2019	19 December 2019	182 days	Guatemalan Army	
	Admiral; Erick Alejandro Sanchez	20 December 2019	14 January 2020	25 days	Guatemalan Navy	
	Brigadier general Hugo Roberto Urbina Marroquín	15 January 2020	18 December 2020	338 days	Guatemalan Army	
	Brigadier general Walfre Omar Carranza España	19 December 2020	31 May 2022	1 year, 163 days	Guatemalan Air Force	
	Brigadier general William Arnulfo López	19 December 2020	14 January 2024	1 year, 228 days	Guatemalan Army	
	Brigadier general Carlos Antonio Medina	18 January 2024	8 May 2024	111 days	Guatemalan Army	
	Brigadier general Hermelindo Choz Soc	8 May 2024	27 June 2025	1 year, 50 days	Guatemalan Army	
	Divisional general Erwin Rolando Gómez Barrera	27 June 2025	30 November 2025	156 days	Guatemalan Army	
	Divisional general José Giovani Martínez Milián	1 December 2025		280 days	Guatemalan Army	
