= Óscar Humberto Mejía Víctores =

Guatemalan military officer and politician

Brigadier General Óscar Humberto Mejía Víctores
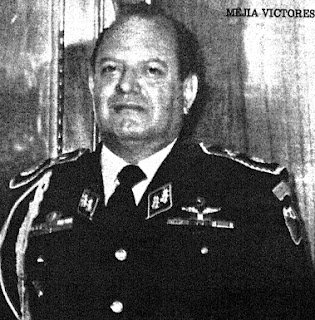
- Mejía Víctores in the 1980s

27th Head of State of Guatemala
- In office August 8, 1983 – January 14, 1986
- Deputy: Rodolfo Lobos Zamora
- Preceded by: Efraín Ríos Montt
- Succeeded by: Vinicio Cerezo

Personal details
- Born: December 9, 1930 Guatemala City
- Died: February 1, 2016 (aged 85) Guatemala City
- Spouse: Aura Rosario Rosal López

Óscar Humberto Mejía Víctores (December 9, 1930 – February 1, 2016) was a Guatemalan military officer and politician who served as the Head of Government from August 1983 to January 1986. A member of the military, he was head of state during the apex of repression and death squad activity in the Central American nation. When he was minister of defense, he rallied a coup against President Ríos Montt, which he justified by declaring that religious fanatics were abusing the government. He allowed for a return to democracy, with elections for a constituent assembly being held in 1984, followed by general elections in 1985.

== Presidency (1983–1986) ==
=== Return to democratic appearances ===
Ríos Montt was deposed on 8 August 1983 by his own Minister of Defense, General Mejía Víctores. Mejía Víctores became then de facto president and justified the coup by saying that "religious fanatics" were abusing their positions in the government and also because of "official corruption." Ríos Montt remained in politics, founding the Guatemalan Republican Front party in 1989. Elected to Congress he was elected President of Congress in 1995 and 2000. Due to international pressure, as well as pressure from other Latin American nations, General Mejía Víctores allowed a gradual return to democracy in Guatemala. On 1 July 1984, an election was held for representatives to a Constituent Assembly to draft a democratic constitution. On 30 May 1985, the Constituent Assembly finished drafting a new constitution, which took effect immediately. General elections were scheduled, and civilian candidate Vinicio Cerezo was elected president. Revival of democratic government did not end the "disappearances" and death squad killings, as extrajudicial state violence had become an integral part of the political culture.

=== Continuing terror ===
By the time Mejía Víctores assumed power, the counterinsurgency under Lucas García and Ríos Montt had largely succeeded in its objective of detaching the insurgency from its civilian support base. Additionally, Guatemalan military intelligence (G-2) had succeeded in infiltrating most of the political institutions. It eradicated opponents in the government through terror and selective assassinations. The counterinsurgency program had militarized Guatemalan society, creating a fearful atmosphere of terror that suppressed most public agitation and insurgency. The military had consolidated its power in virtually all sectors of society.

In 1983, indigenous activist Rigoberta Menchú published a memoir of her life during that period, I, Rigoberta Menchú, An Indian Woman in Guatemala, which gained worldwide attention. She is the daughter of one of the peasant leaders who died in the Spanish Embassy massacre on 31 January 1980. She was later awarded the 1992 Nobel Peace Prize—in the year of the Fifth Centennial celebration of America Discovery—for her work favoring broader social justice. (Note: "Stanford Magazine". Stanfordalumni.org. June 1999. Archived from the original on 5 July 2008. "When some autobiographical details in the book were challenged, the Nobel Committee stated that they did not consider this grounds for rescinding the award for her work") Her memoir drew international attention to Guatemala and the nature of its institutional terrorism.

After the August 1983 coup, both the U.S. intelligence community and human rights observers noted that while cases of human rights abuses in rural Guatemala were on the decline, death squad activity in the city was on the rise. Additionally, as the levels of wholesale extrajudicial killings and massacres decreased, the rates of abduction and forced disappearance increased. The situation in Guatemala City soon resembled the situation under Lucas García. In Mejía Víctores's first full month in power, the number of documented monthly kidnappings jumped from 12 in August to 56 in September. The victims included several U.S. Agency for International Development employees, officials from moderate and leftist political parties, and Catholic priests. In a report to the United Nations, Guatemala's Human Rights Commission reported 713 extrajudicial killings and 506 disappearances of Guatemalans in the period from January to September 1984. A secret United States Department of Defense report from March 1986 noted that from 8 August 1983 to 31 December 1985, there were a total of 2,883 recorded kidnappings (3.29 daily), and kidnappings averaged a total of 137 a month through 1984 (a total of approximately 1,644 cases). The report linked these violations to a systematic program of abduction and killing by the security forces under Mejía Víctores, noting, "while criminal activity accounts for a small percentage of the cases, and from time to time individuals ‘disappear’ to go elsewhere, the security forces and paramilitary groups are responsible for most kidnappings. Insurgent groups do not now normally use kidnapping as a political tactic."

Under Lucas García, part of the modus operandi of government repression during the Mejía government involved interrogating victims at military bases, police stations, or government safe houses. Information about alleged connections with insurgents was "extracted through torture." The security forces used the information to make joint military/police raids on suspected guerrilla safe-houses throughout Guatemala City. In the process, the government secretly captured hundreds of individuals who were never seen again or whose bodies were later found showing signs of torture and mutilation. Such activities were often carried out by specialized units of the National Police. Between 1984 and 1986, the secret police (G-2) maintained an operations center for the counterinsurgency programs in southwest Guatemala at the southern airbase at Retalhuleu. There, the G-2 operated a clandestine interrogation center for suspected insurgents and collaborators. Captured suspects were reportedly detained in water-filled pits along the perimeter of the base, which was covered with cages. To avoid drowning, prisoners were forced to hold onto the cages over the pits. The bodies of prisoners tortured to death and live prisoners marked for disappearance were thrown out of IAI-201 Aravas by the Guatemalan Air Force over the Pacific Ocean ("death flights").

Along with former Presidents José Efraín Ríos Montt and Fernando Romeo Lucas García, President Mejía was charged with murder, kidnapping and genocide in a Spanish court.

== Bibliography ==
- CIA (29 October 1983). GUATEMALA: Political Violence. George Washington University: CIA, top secret intelligence report.
- CIDH (1999). "Organizing and Repression in the University of San Carlos, Guatemala, 1944 to 1996: 1983–1989: The Illusion of Democracy". SHR, AAAS. Archived from the original on 6 May 2013.
- CIDH (1981). "Guatemala 1981, Chapter IX". CIDH.
- Defense Intelligence Agency (30 June 1983). Possible Coup in Guatemala (PDF). National Security Archive Electronic. Vol. Briefing Book No. 32. George Washington University: Defense Intelligence Agency, secret cable Section 3.
- Defense Intelligence Agency (11 April 1994). Suspected Presence of Clandestine Cemeteries on a Military Installation (PDF). George Washington University: Defense Intelligence Agency, secret message.
- Pike, John (n.d.). "Guatemala". Globalsecurity.org.
- US Department of State (23 October 1967). Guatemala: A Counter-Insurgency Running Wild? (PDF). National Security Archive Electronic. Vol. Briefing Book No. 32. George Washington University: National Security Archive. p. 1.
- US State Department (1967). "Guatemala". Assignment terror: The Army's Special Unit. National Security Archive Electronic. Vol. Briefing Book No. George Washington University: National Security Archive.
- US Department of State (28 March 1986). Guatemala's Disappeared: 1977-86. George Washington University: Department of State, secret report.

Political offices
Preceded by José Efraín Ríos Montt	President of Guatemala; 1983–1986	Succeeded by Vinicio Cerezo
