= 1982 Guatemalan coup d'état =

- Part of Guatemalan Civil War
Date	March 23, 1982
Location	Guatemala
Result	Coup successful: 1982 election results nullfied; Military junta assumes power

Belligerents
Government of Guatemala: Guatemalan military	Government of Guatemala

Commanders and leaders
Efraín Ríos Montt; Leonel Sisniega Otero	Fernando Romeo Lucas García; Ángel Aníbal Guevara

Strength
19 officers 2000 soldiers	Unknown

The 1982 Guatemalan coup d'état was a successful military overthrow in Guatemala by junior military officers, ousting the Romeo Lucas Garcia administration and installing a three-man military junta headed by General Efraín Ríos Montt. The general ruled for a brief but bloody 17 months before being overthrown by his defense minister General Oscar Mejia Victores in another coup.

== Coup attempt ==
Following the March 7 elections which were widely seen as rigged in favor of the government-backed candidate Ángel Aníbal Guevara, dissatisfied junior army and air force officers who wanted free elections and a civilian president began planning a coup to prevent Anibal's rise to power, who was scheduled to be inaugurated as president on July 1.

About 19 military officers, along with Leonel Sisniega Otero, the vice-presidential candidate for the National Liberation Movement (MLN) in the March elections, participated in the plotting of the coup attempt for eight days. During that period, they managed to gain the support of top air force officials and elite army brigades. On March 23, 1982, the coup was finally launched at around 4 am. The 2000-strong rebel force, who identified each other through specific uniform modifications, successfully surrounded the presidential palace and forced the resignation of President Romeo Lucas Garcia in a near-bloodless manner. He was taken to the international airport and left Guatemala shortly after. Meanwhile, just three hours after the start of the coup attempt, Sisniega Otero announced the coup on a seized radio station to the nation, declaring intentions for new elections to be held.

Following the successful coup attempt, General Efraín Ríos Montt was summoned to the National Palace, chosen to lead as he was once the Military Academy's dean and thus respected by many in the army. There, he was named head of a three-man military junta; the two other members of the junta were General Horacio Maldonado Shad and Colonel Francisco Gordillo. In the evening, General Ríos Montt made his first nationwide address, promising "peace, work, and security." for the nation. He further announced the dissolution of the congress and stated the junta will rule by decree. The coup plotters, who had expected a civilian-military junta and immediate elections, became disillusioned as their hopes were dashed. The general diminished the role of civilian participants after taking charge, including Lionel Sisniga, who was sidelined. This was in part because Sisniega's party the MLN "stole" General Ríos Montt's victory in the 1974 elections, which were perceived to be fraudulent.

== Post-coup ==
During Ríos Montt's reign between March 23, 1982, to August 8, 1983, Ríos Montt initiated a crackdown on the newly formed Guatemalan National Revolutionary Unity (URNG), an umbrella organization composed of Marxist guerilla groups. He launched extermination campaigns against both leftist rebels and indigenous people. Under his rule, the army and its paramilitary units systematically destroyed over 600 villages. Approximately 200,000 people died or disappeared, 1.5 million were displaced, and over 150,000 immigrated to Mexico. The Commission for Historical Clarification reported that 93% of the violence which occurred during this period were state sponsored while the guerillas were responsible for 3%. 83% of the victims were Mayan while 17% were Latino. This period is referred to as the "Silent Holocaust."

Unable to gain the support of key power holders in Guatemala, such as wealthy landowners, conservative politicians, and army officers, he was deposed on August 8, 1983, by defense minister General Meíja Víctores. Contributing factors to his downfall included his erratic behavior and religious zealotry, a declining economy, and a deteriorating human rights record.
