= 1983 Guatemalan coup d'état =

- Part of Guatemalan Civil War
Date	August 8, 1983
Location	Guatemala
Result	Successful coup

Belligerents
Guatemalan Armed Forces	Government of Guatemala

Commanders and leaders
Óscar Humberto Mejía Víctores	Efraín Ríos Montt

Casualties and losses
- 1 dead

The 1983 Guatemalan coup d'état was a palace revolt in Guatemala by the officer corps, led by then Defense Minister General Óscar Humberto Mejía Víctores, which successfully ousted General Ríos Montt. Mejía Víctores governed the country for three years until international pressure forced him to make democratic reforms. By 1986, power was relinquished to the democratically elected Vinicio Cerezo.

== Coup attempt ==
Due to his alienation of the ruling elite – wealthy landowners, army officers, and conservative politicians – through his erratic behavior and religious zeal to a fundamentalist Protestant sect in a predominantly Catholic country, Ríos Montt's downfall was largely anticipated. Other contributing factors included his refusal to schedule elections and his governance which led to human rights abuses and a declining economy.

Thus, amidst widespread discontent over his electoral programs, the officer corps led by Defense Minister General Óscar Humberto Mejía Víctores staged a palace coup against General Ríos Montt on August 8, 1983. The resulting clashes between government and rebel forces left at least one dead along with several wounded. Suspicions of foreign involvement were raised when it was revealed Mejía Víctores met with the Southern Command of the US military the day before the coup, leading to accusations the United States sponsored the military overthrow. In response, the State Department denied any and all involvement.

== Post-coup ==
Following the successful coup, General Ríos Montt was forced into retirement and General Mejía Víctores was sworn in as the new chief of state. The inauguration ceremony was attended by key military officials and former cabinet members of the deposed administration. Mejía Víctores, who had not assumed the title of President and continued on as Minister of Defense and Chief of State, pledged to call for elections, suspend the military tribunals, lift the state of alarm which had been in effect since June 29, 1983, and respect the judiciary and constitution. His promises however were seen as merely superficial gestures to placate international observers.

The coup was viewed by some as largely insignificant in terms of substantial change, representing merely another reshuffling between the military who had controlled Guatemala for decades. This was supported by the fact Mejía Víctores was part of the same military elite resistant to change, as evidenced by his hostility towards US officials regarding human rights violations.

Nevertheless, Mejía Víctores kept his promises and lifted the state of alarm, abolished the Courts of Special Jurisdiction, dissolved the Council of state, and ensured due process and judicial integrity by broadening individual guarantees. He also promulgated a new amnesty law for political crimes. However, the brutal tactics that characterized the previous regime persisted under his reign, with a reported 90–100 political killings per month in 1984.

Eventually, the government made democratic reforms to attract foreign aid, leading to elections being held in 1984 for the Constitutional Assembly, which was tasked with drafting a new constitution. The new drafted constitution was adopted the following year on May 31, 1985. General elections were held on November 3 which resulted in Vinicio Cerezo being victorious. On January 14, 1986, Cerezo was inaugurated as president.
