= Ángel Aníbal Guevara =

Former Guatemalan Army officer and politician

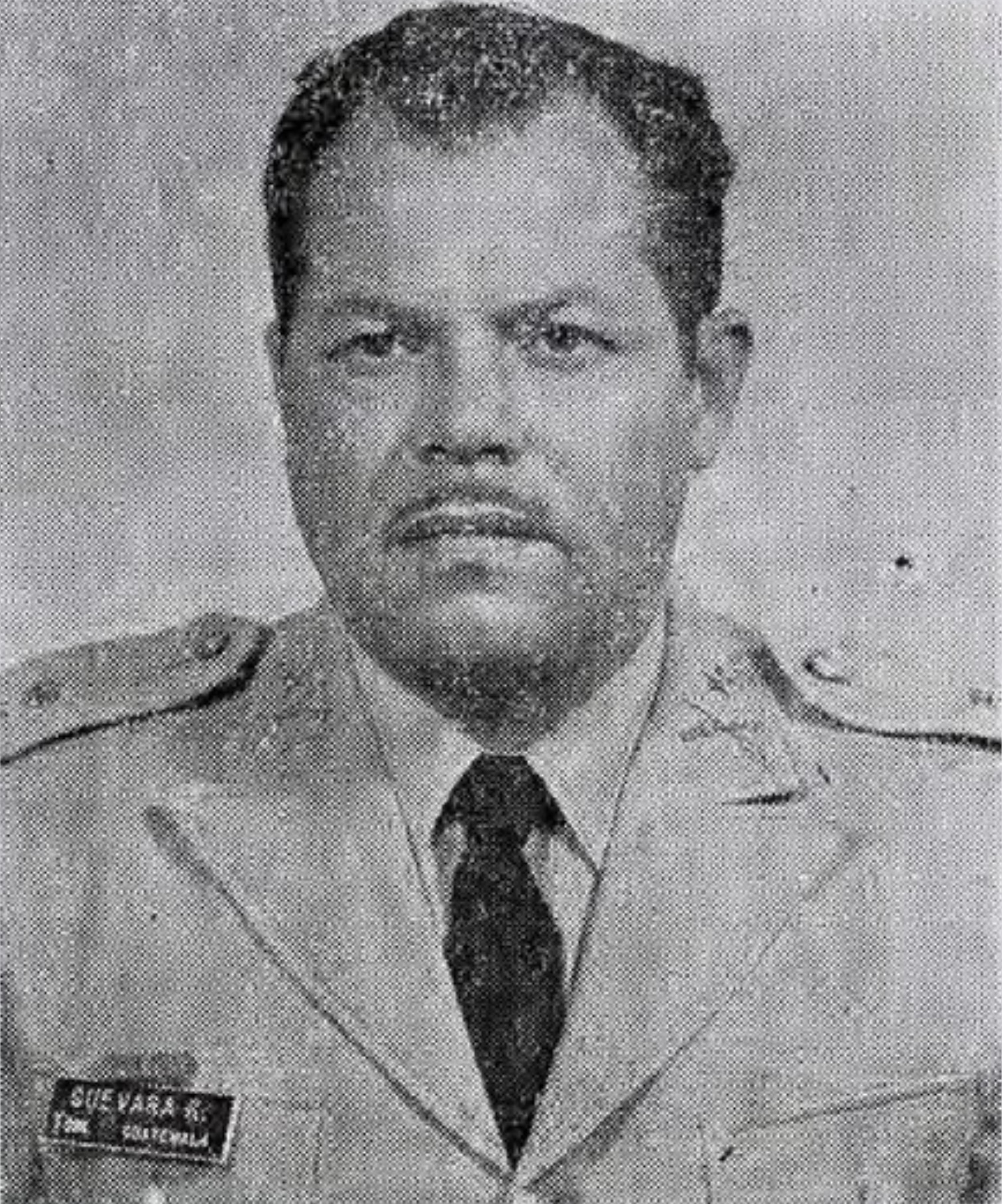
- Guevara in the 1960s

Minister of Defense
- In office 15 January 1980 – 9 August 1981
- President: Romeo Lucas García
- Preceded by: Otto Guillermo Spiegeler Noriega
- Succeeded by: Luís René Mendoza Palomo

Personal details
- Born: 2 October 1925 (age 100) La Democracia, Escuintla, Guatemala

Ángel Aníbal Guevara Rodríguez (/ɡəˈvɑːrə/; born 2 October 1925) is a former Guatemalan Army officer and politician.

Guevara was born in La Democracia, Escuintla. Having served as defense minister, Guevara was victorious in the 1982 presidential election to succeed outgoing President Fernando Romeo Lucas García, who had hand-picked him as his successor. However, the election was widely denounced as fraudulent by both left-wing and right-wing groups. A military-led coup d'état, two weeks after the election, prevented Guevara from assuming power and instead installed a three-man junta headed by Gen. Efraín Ríos Montt.

He ran again in 1995 but failed to gain much support.

Currently, he is on Interpol's Red Notice list, wanted by Belgium for murder and crimes against humanity.
