= Loh I-cheng =

Ambassador of Taiwan

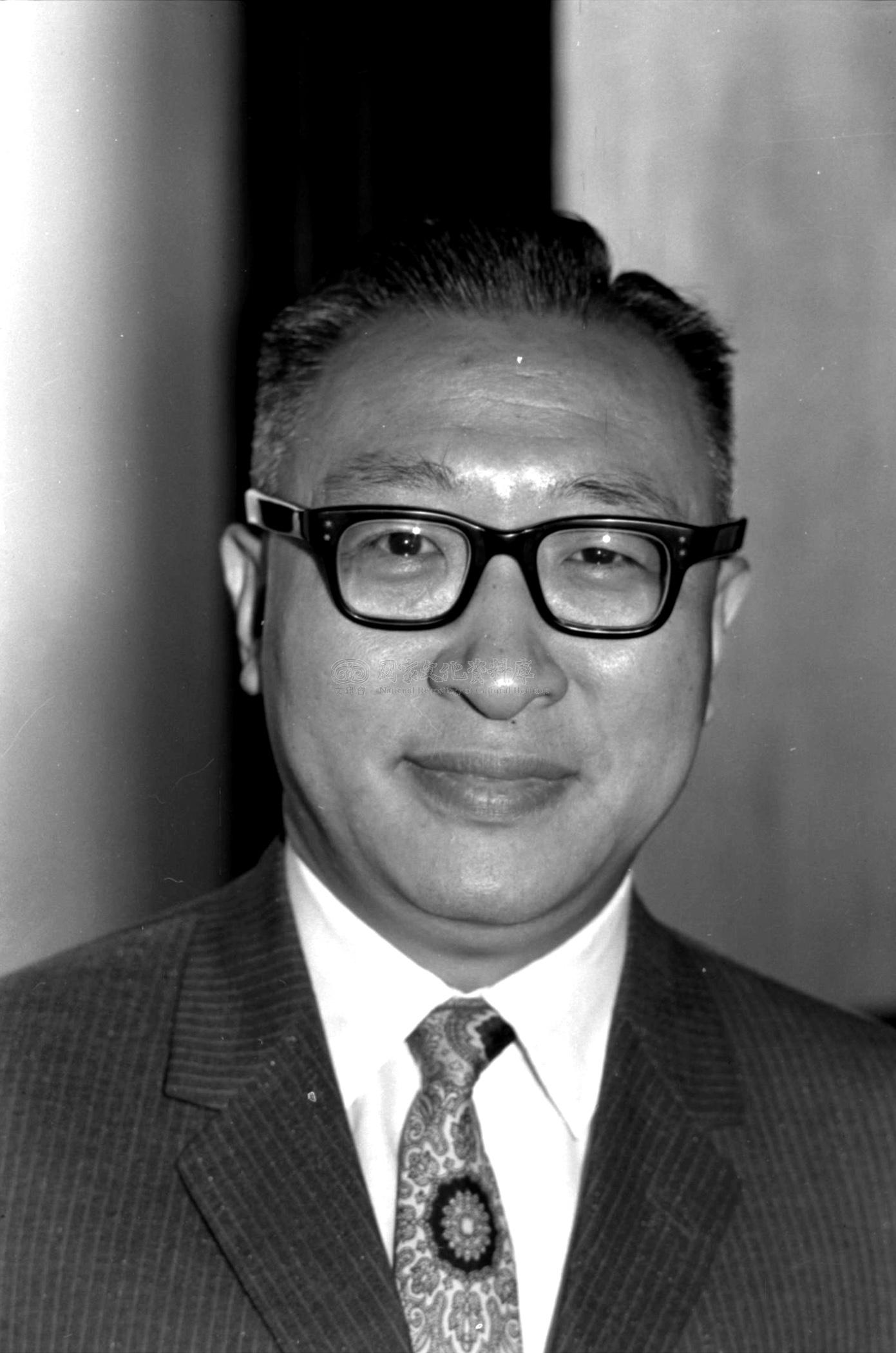
Loh in 1969

Gene Loh or Loh I-cheng (Chinese: 陸以正; pinyin: Lù Yǐzhèng, 1924 – 26 February 2016) was a diplomat of the Republic of China in Taiwan.

== Early life and education ==
Loh was born in 1924 in Nanchang, Jiangxi. His family settled in Taicang, Jiangsu. During the Second Sino-Japanese War, he served in Yunnan as a translator for American soldiers. After the war, he entered National Chengchi University (then located in Nanjing). Following his graduation, he went on to Columbia University for an M.A. in journalism.

== Career ==
Loh served the United States as an interpreter and interrogator during the Korean War, and was awarded a Medal of Freedom in 1954 by Dwight D. Eisenhower. In 1970, Loh began working in the Chinese Information Service in New York City. His service there came to an abrupt end in February 1979 during the Carter administration: he was expelled right before Deng Xiaoping's official visit.

In May 1984, while serving as ROC ambassador to Guatemala, Loh went to Belize and met with William Quinto and George Cadle Price to discuss the possibility of establishing relations between the ROC and Belize, but Guatemalan leader Rodolfo Lobos Zamora objected, and after Manuel Esquivel of the Belizean opposition United Democratic Party took power in the election late that year, the plans were put aside.

In 1990, Loh was appointed ambassador to South Africa. By 1996 he had become the dean of the diplomatic corps there. Later that year, Nelson Mandela announced that his government would establish relations with Beijing in 1997; a visit by Foreign Minister John Chiang to meet with Alfred Baphethuxolo Nzo and attempt to salvage the situation produced no results, and so Loh was recalled on 6 December 1996. Loh spent four more years as Taipei's ambassador-at-large before retiring in 2001.

== Later activities ==
In 2002, Loh published his 453-page memoirs, Valiant but Fruitless Endeavors: The Memoirs of Loh I-Cheng (微臣無力可回天——陸以正的外交生涯), based on diaries he had kept since 1979; the book's primary focus was on those major incidents of Taiwan's diplomatic history he had witnessed in his career, namely the expulsion of Taipei's representatives from the United Nations, and the loss of diplomatic recognition by the United States and then by South Africa. He was nearly an hour late to his own book launching.

Loh continued to write and comment about politics after the publication of his memoirs. In 2005, he started a donation movement to help local cable television station TVBS pay an NT$1 million fine assessed by the Government Information Office, which he described as politically motivated and a threat to the freedom of the press. In 2006, he urged the recall of then-President Chen Shui-bian, and if that failed, the overthrow of the cabinet of Su Tseng-chang. In 2008, he wrote an article in a Taiwan newspaper suggesting that President Ma Ying-jeou should bring the National Unification Council out of dormancy in line with the Guidelines for National Unification as a goodwill gesture, in response to Beijing's willingness to let Taiwan participate in the 2008 Summer Olympics under the name "Chinese Taipei" instead of "Taipei, China".

== Personal life ==
Loh was married to Jane Y. Loh, with whom he had three children: Willie, Phillip, and Suzette (born 1961). Suzette, a graduate of Phillips Exeter Academy and Barnard College, died of cancer in 2006.

In April 2010, Loh was struck by a taxi while crossing a road in the Eastern District of Taipei. This led to local controversy over the issue of pedestrian safety. Lo died in 2016 at the age of 92.

== Works ==
- Loh, I-Cheng (2000). "The Gordian Knot in Cross-Strait Relations: The Question of Taiwan's Participation in International Organizations". In Gong, Gerrit W (ed.). Taiwan Strait dilemmas: China–Taiwan–U.S. policies in the new century. Center for Strategic and International Studies. ISBN 9780892063635.

Diplomatic posts
Preceded by H. K. Yang	Ambassador of the Republic of China to the Republic of South Africa; 1990–1996	Succeeded by Position abolished
