= Armed Forces of Guatemala =

Combined military forces of Guatemala

- Fuerzas Armadas de Guatemala (Spanish)
- Coat of arms of Guatemala
- Current form: 30 June 1871
- Service branches: Army; Navy; Air Force

Leadership
- Commander-in-Chief: Bernardo Arévalo
- Minister of National Defence: Henry Sáenz Ramos
- Chief of the General Staff: José Giovani Martínez Milián

Personnel
- Military age: 18
- Active personnel: 18,050 (2024)
- Reserve personnel: 63,850 (2024)
- Deployed personnel: 186 (2024)

Expenditure
- Budget: USD$412 million (2023)

Related articles
- History: War of 1863; Barrios' War of Reunification; Totoposte Wars; Guatemalan Civil War; Operation Uphold Democracy; Gang war in Haiti
- Ranks: Military ranks of Guatemala

The Armed Forces of Guatemala (Spanish: Fuerzas Armadas de Guatemala) is the unified military organization of the Guatemala, consisting of three services: the Army, Navy, and Air Force. The Guatemalan Armed Forces are responsible for defending the sovereignty and territorial integrity of the country, and both internal and external security. The president of Guatemala is the commander-in-chief of the military, and formulates policy, training, and budget through the Minister of National Defense. The Chief of the General Staff is responsible for its operations.

The formal establishment of the organization occurred after the start of the liberal period in Guatemala on 30 June 1871, a date that is commemorated as Armed Forces Day. The Guatemalan military emerged as the dominant political force in the country after the 1954 coup d'état and instituted a military dictatorship until 1986. During the Guatemalan Civil War from 1960 to 1996, the military waged a counter-insurgency campaign against left-wing guerilla fighters that resulted in many atrocities against civilians, a genocide of the Maya population, and the deaths of 200,000 people.

Since the civil war, the military underwent reforms to strengthen civilian control and accountability, though it still has a high degree of autonomy. More recently, Guatemalan forces have taken part in United Nations peacekeeping missions and have assisted other government agencies in combating organized crime.

== History ==
=== Early development ===
When news of the independence of Mexico reached the local elite in Guatemala, independence from Spain was declared on 15 September 1821. Guatemalan conservatives ensured that the country was incorporated into the First Mexican Empire, but after its dissolution in 1823, Guatemala became part of the Federal Republic of Central America. The conflict between liberals and conservatives that followed was essentially a war between Guatemala and El Salvador, with Guatemalan conservatives wanting to disband the federation. The conservatives were defeated and Guatemala was led by a liberal government under Mariano Gálvez from 1831 to 1838, who introduced several measures that were unpopular among rural Guatemalans, including anticlerical policies towards the Catholic Church and quarantines during an outbreak of cholera. An uprising led by Rafael Carrera overthrew the liberal government and established conservative rule from 1839 to 1865. Carrera became the president of the State of Guatemala in 1844 and declared it an independent republic in 1847, leading a strongly conservative and Catholic government.

For the first fifty years of Guatemala's independence the armed forces consisted of ad hoc gangs recruited by local elites during their conflicts. The task of the armed forces was to back the political leader in office as long as that leader followed the rules set by the wealthy oligarchy. After Carrera's death in 1865, Vicente Cerna led a more moderate government, until he was overthrown in a rebellion backed by powerful coffee oligarchs from the western highlands that defeated his army. During the liberal period beginning from 30 June 1871, Guatemala's liberal governments made an effort to professionalize the military, and the officer corps in particular. The creation of the Escuela Politécnica military academy on 4 February 1873 by presidents Miguel García Granados and Justo Rufino Barrios was the first move towards a formal national army controlled by the Gautemalan state. Instruction there was provided by Spanish or French advisors, and its first director was an officer from the Spanish Army's infantry school in Toledo. A Colegio Militar had existed prior to 1873, but it was not comparable to the Escuela Politécnica that replaced it.

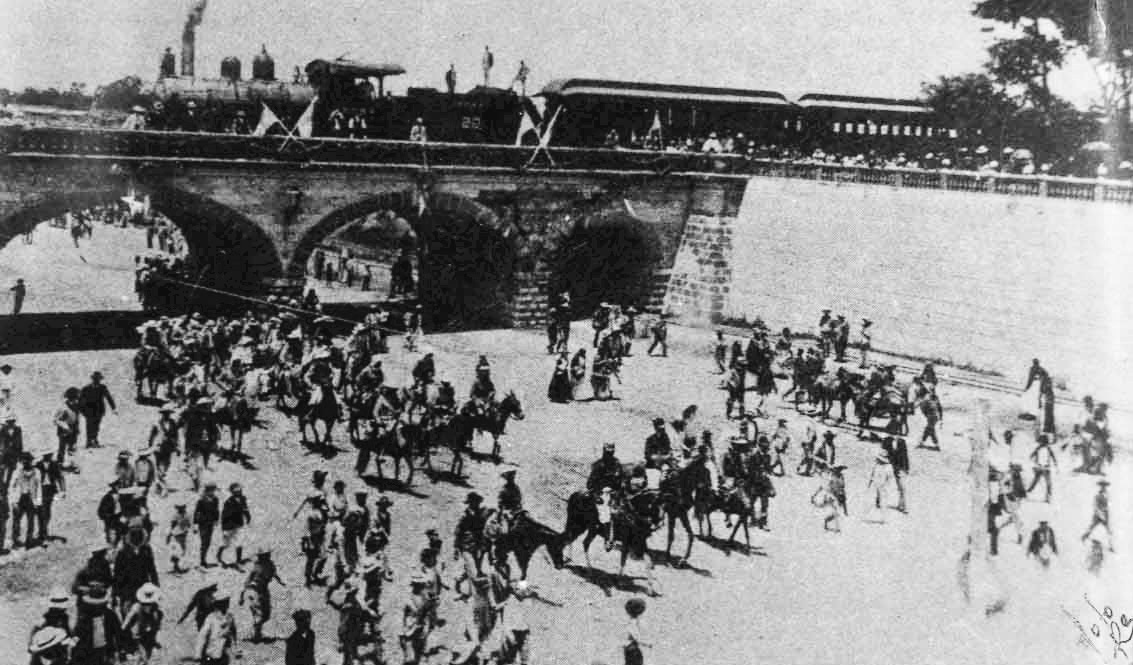
Guatemalan troops returning from the Totoposte War with El Salvador in 1906.

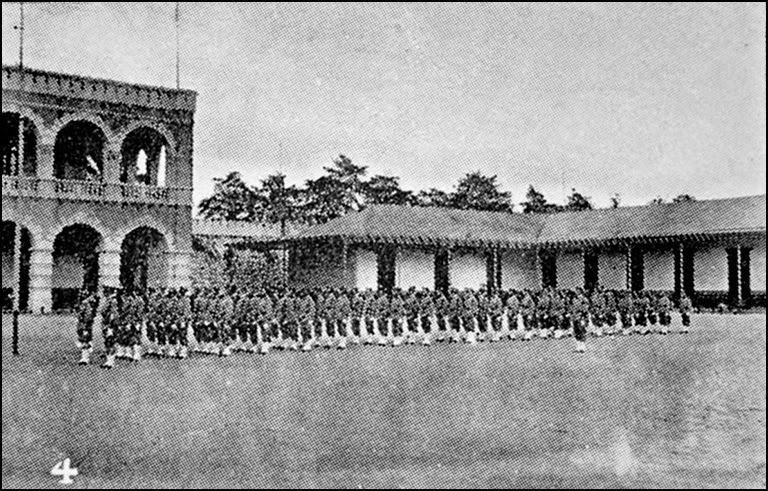
Guatemalan soldiers at the Escuela Politécnica in 1915.

The military started to become a vehicle for social mobility for the working and middle classes. However, little progress was made in the professionalization of the armed forces beyond the creation of a formal national army. An officer career was seen as a springboard to a more lucrative position, such as joining the landowner class. In 1891, Guatemala requested a military advisory mission to be sent from France, which was initially refused due to the poor economic conditions in the country. The mission arrived in 1898 and remained until the early 1930s. Its presence led to Guatemala increasingly buying military equipment from France instead of Germany, as had been the case previously, and during World War I the country asked France to modernize its army in preparation for a possible deployment to Europe.

Graduates of the Escuela Politécnica developed a high esprit de corps. Some of its nearly 700 graduates saw combat in border conflicts with Guatemala's neighbors before it was briefly closed in 1908. After the death of Justo Rufino Barrios in El Salvador during one of those wars, he was followed by a series of liberal leaders. The last of them, Manuel Estrada Cabrera, was in office from 1898 and 1920, and presided over the growing influence of the United Fruit Company, which began cultivating bananas and building infrastructure in Guatemala. Members of the Politécnica led a failed uprising against Cabrera's despotic rule in 1908, after which the school was temporarily closed, and was fully restored after his overthrow in 1920.

=== The military in politics ===
==== Jorge Ubico regime ====
The removal of Cabrera led to the rise of military governments during the 1920s, led by the generals José María Orellana and Lázaro Chacón. During their tenure the Guatemalan military was used by the coffee elite and the United Fruit Company to suppress growing opposition against them. The Great Depression had a major impact on Guatemala's single-crop export economy, and General Jorge Ubico assumed power in a 1931 election that was carefully managed by the military. He put the state at the service of the oligarchy and began suppressing labor unions and left-wing movements. Ubico also began militarizing the state, appointing generals as provincial governors and to other key positions overseeing infrastructure development. However, the military's senior ranks far exceeded the number of available positions for them, and during his early years Ubico reduced the number of promotions. This changed in 1937, when he started increasing promotions as a way of ensuring loyalty from the officer corps. The pre-1931 conditions were restored: an incompetent but politically influential officer caste leading poorly trained soldiers drafted from society's lowest caste.

Guatemala requested a military mission from the United States in late 1929, and it arrived in April 1930. The mission later operated within the context of the Good Neighbor policy towards Central America. Ubico asked the head of the mission, United States Army Major John A. Considine, to serve as the head of the military academy and instructed him to "make the Escuela Politécnica as near like West Point as possible". Considine, with the brevet rank of brigadier general in the Guatemalan Army, reformed the courses at the school and succeeded in improving the education there. Considine's biggest success was described as instilling Guatemalan officer cadets with American "West Point discipline". He served there until 1934, and at Ubico's request, American officers continued to be appointed as directors of the academy until 1945. Graduates were commissioned as a subteniente of the infantry, cavalry, or engineers, or a teniente of artillery. In 1941 the Escuela de Táctica Aplicada was founded and modeled on the Command and General Staff College at Fort Leavenworth, to train select officers on leadership matters. France maintained an advisory mission to the Guatemalan Air Force during the Ubico years, which had started during Cabrera's presidency, until 1941.

Ubico controlled the Ministry of War himself by giving orders through the minister. The military budget was increased and the army was well equipped by Central American standards. According to a U.S. military attaché in 1941, the armed forces were "organized as a large police force rather than a modern army. Its prime objective seems to be the preservation of internal peace and not to engage in any conflict with another military force equipped with modern arms and munitions."

Ubico also made an effort to improve the living conditions and training for the troops outside of the military academy, but according to American observers, only the cadets at the Escuela Politécnica received adequate training. In garrisons across Guatemala's departments, troops received training only in military parades, and "their principle purpose seems to be at the guard house where a prodigious number of them 'sit' all day long to be called to attention whenever an officer passes." In some parts of western Guatemala garrisons consisting of indigenous Maya peoples who did not speak Spanish were led by Spanish-speaking officers. While Ubico described military service as "a school of citizenship which returns the individual to everyday life a man and a patriot who is ready to practice self-denial," American observers noted that Guatemalan soldiers only served out of personal loyalty to their leaders, and not for the state or any abstract principles. The government also intended to use the military to integrate the Maya with the urbanized Ladino society. Guatemalan law mandated military service for men between the ages of 18 and 50 (one year in the infantry or two years in other branches), but wealthier families were able to pay to avoid conscription. In practice the lower ranks of soldiers consisted entirely of indigenous people.

About half of the officer corps were Politécnica graduates while the others, especially majors or below, were line officers who had been promoted from the ranks of indigenous Maya soldiers. Serving as a soldier and becoming a commissioned officer was a path to upward mobility for the indigenous population, while attending the Politécnica and becoming an officer served that purpose for the Ladino urban middle class. The oligarchy sometimes sent its sons to the Politécnica but they typically left the military right after graduation, which they could do because their family paid their tuition instead of the state. There was an increasing number of Ladino officers in the middle ranks, but Ubico kept filling the highest ranks with less qualified and more politically connected indigenous officers.

==== Military consolidation ====
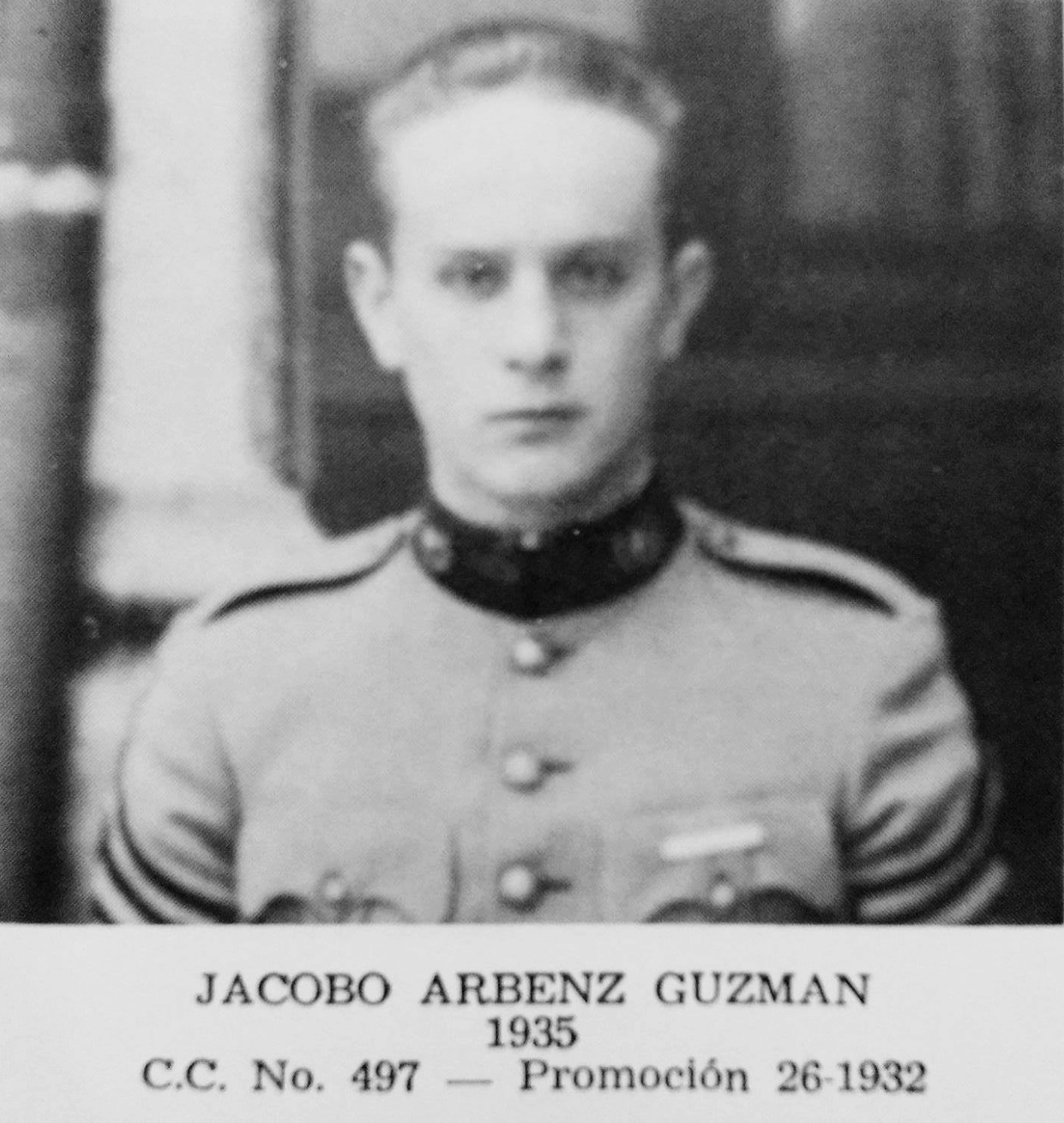
Jacobo Árbenz as a cadet at the Escuela Politécnica in 1932. He was one of the graduates involved in the Guatemalan Revolution and was president of Guatemala before the 1954 coup d'état.

In the early 1940s the military was led by "an octogenarian, illiterate Secretary of War and a preponderance of incompetents on its active list of 67 general officers". By 1944 the Guatemalan armed forces had 15,000 troops and 80 generals, even though there were only five to seven military commands. This caused resentment and tensions between the more professional and competent graduados who were kept at the lower-to-mid level ranks, and the generals who had been appointed from the oficiales de línea (line officers). Ubico banned political discussions in the military and relied on his ageing generals, not realizing that they had lost control of the growing divide within the officer corps until the Guatemalan Revolution. The rebellion reflected this divide and removed the "old guard". In October 1944 it was the Politécnica graduates that revolted against Federico Ponce Vaides, the provisional president that replaced Ubico, amidst a background of sweeping economic and social changes. The army officers, in an alliance with the middle class, removed the traditional elite and the old guard generals. The "October revolution" led to the emergence of the armed forces as the dominant political force in the country and, ultimately, to the institutionalized Guatemalan military dictatorship of 1954 to 1986.

The period from 1944 to 1954 saw the presidencies of the opposition leader and former exile Juan José Arévalo and his successor, Jacobo Árbenz, and is known as the "Ten Years of Spring" for their social welfare policies. Guatemalan society became more complex in the years leading up to and during World War II as the plantation economy declined and urban workers started making consistent demands on issues such as land reform, better pay, and increased political rights. Guatemalan politics from 1945 to 1960 became fragmented as the traditional elite lost control. In contrast, the Guatemalan armed forces became more consolidated than before. The army was more disciplined and cohesive than other professional institution in Guatemala, and it developed a sense of shared identity with the nation, guided by the professionalism and sense of national and personal honor among its officer corps. As civilian institutions fragmented the door to political power was opened to a disciplined military with a sense of purpose and an awareness of its own competence. This consolidation of the military took place under President Árbenz in particular.

The Arévalo and Árbenz administrations had placated the older line officers by appointing one of them, Francisco Javier Arana, to a powerful new position, the armed forces chief of staff, in 1945. However, Árbenz later began rapidly promoting younger officers into military and political positions, agitating the older line officers. The U.S.-backed 1954 coup d'état was the beginning of military dictatorship, even though there was much resentment in the armed forces for Colonel Carlos Castillo Armas having been "thrust" onto them by the United States. The coup followed a decision by Árbenz to seize uncultivated land and to reallocate it to the peasants, which affected the United Fruit Company. The company convinced the administration of U.S. President Dwight Eisenhower that Guatemala had been taken over by communism, and he used the Central Intelligence Agency for a covert operation to overthrow Árbenz by supporting an invasion of the country by anti-communist exiles under Armas and persuading the Guatemalan army to not resist.

The 1945 constitution established a Superior Council of National Defense (Consejo Superior de Defensa Nacional), separating the army command from the executive, and also a General Staff of the Armed Forces that was autonomous from and in effect above the law. The Consejo was led by the armed forces chief of staff, and included ten permanent members (the army and air force chiefs of staff, the seven military zone chiefs, and the defense minister), along with eleven officers elected by the officer corps every three years. As of 1954, the total strength of the Army was 6,000 personnel, organized into two infantry regiments and distributed among the capital and six military zones, while the total strength of the Air Force was 230 personnel and 39 aircraft. Armas dissolved both the Consejo and the Armed Forces General Staff in 1954, but the military kept its political role: the post-1954 Guatemalan army became strongly anti-communist and its autonomous status was solidified with the enactment of a new constitution and army law in 1956.

==== Guatemalan Civil War ====
Military cadets at the Escuela Politécnica that grew up in the social democratic experiment of the "Ten Years of Spring" became a vanguard for social justice and later some of the first guerrilla leaders. After the army high command forced Árbenz to resign under U.S. pressure in June 1954, Armas and his returning exiles were fired upon by some cadets, who surrendered after one day. This was followed by an unsuccessful coup attempt on 2 August 1954, and another two occurred over the next several years, leading up to coup of 13 November 1960 that began the Guatemalan Civil War. General Ydígoras Fuentes, who became president after the assassination of Armas in 1957, allowed the CIA to contract Guatemalan officers to train the anti-Fidel Casto Cuban exiles of Brigade 2506 in Guatemala. His government was also seen as corrupt, and the older officers refused to embrace the irregular warfare training that was taught to the younger ones by the United States starting from 1959. The coup was launched by about 120 leftist junior officers in the name of social justice, wealth redistribution, and opposition to foreign imperialism. Sixty officers, or 21% of the Guatemalan officer corps, were court-martialed after the coup attempt. Officers who escaped capture included lieutenants Luis Augusto Turcios Lima and Marco Antonio Yon Sosa, who had received jungle and mountain warfare training from the U.S. at the Panama Canal Zone and Fort Benning.

Yon Sosa announced the founding of the Revolutionary Movement 13th November (MR-13) in August 1961, which merged in December 1962 with the Rebel Armed Forces (FAR), the military wing of the Guatemalan Party of Labour (PGT). The former officers led the guerrilla movement, which at the time had up to 500 members, in the eastern departments of Izabal and Zacapa, where they had support among Ladino peasants. Fuentes began leading the army against the growing guerilla movement in eastern Guatemala. The armed forces in the early 1960s, below the military zone level, consisted of under-strength brigades and separate battalions, companies, scattered detachments, and light artillery batteries. Weapons came from multiple countries and logistical support was nonexistent. The chain of command was unclear. The U.S. Military Assistance Program to Guatemala provided new arms and equipment, and also founded the Central Maintenance Facility, the Central Recruit Training Center, the engineer battalion, and two rapid reaction airborne companies. The role of the general staff was defined. This gave the armed forces a more centralized structure over logistics, personnel, training, and planning.

In 1963 the military declared a state of siege in the country, suspended civil rights, and began expanding its control over the civilian government throughout the 1960s and 1970s, directing the entire state to focus on the counter-insurgency effort. After the ambush and killing of 18 soldiers in May 1965 and the election of Julio César Méndez Montenegro, the government launched a more intense counter-insurgency campaign in October 1966, and by the end of that year the guerrillas were nearly eliminated. Colonel Carlos Arana Osorio oversaw the campaign of 1966 to 1967, and it was assisted by the U.S. 8th Special Forces Group. A vast military intelligence network, sophisticated torture techniques, and death squads were developed by the military. It also became responsible for law enforcement and local administration. By the 1980s the aggressive counter-insurgency campaign in rural Guatemala had achieved many tactical successes and was the most efficient in Latin America. However, it was marked by massive human rights violations. Governments led by generals Kjell Eugenio Laugerud García and Romeo Lucas García from the 1970s into the early 1980s presided over hundreds of arbitrary executions, kidnappings, and forced disappearances every month. The campaign eviscerated political institutions and life in Guatemala, and the abuses also caused the number of insurgents to grow.

Military zone structure during the second half of the civil war, 1983–1996
National Defense General Staff

- ZM1 – General HQ Guatemala City
- ZM302 – Chimaltenango and Sacatepéquez
- ZM4 – Baja Verapaz
- ZM6 – Puerto Barrios
- ZM705 – Zacapa and El Progreso
- ZM8 – Chiquimula
- ZM9 – Jalapa
- ZM10 – Jutiapa
- ZM11 – Santa Rosa
- ZM12 – Escuintla
- ZM1316 – Retalhuleu and Suchitepéquez
- ZM14 – Sololá
- ZM1715 – Quetzaltenango and Totonicapan
- ZM18 – San Marcos
- ZM19 – Huehuetenango
- ZM20 – Quiché
- ZM21 – Alta Verapaz
- ZM22 – Playa Grande Ixcan Quiche
- ZM23 – Petén

At the start of the 1980s Guatemala was "on the verge of collapse," with a declining economy, high unemployment, widespread corruption, and a polarized society. The insurgency gained increasing support among the indigenous population in the central and western highlands and sympathy from the struggling urban working class. Guatemala also faced international isolation as the administration of U.S. President Jimmy Carter focused on the military's atrocious human rights record. Increasing casualties among soldiers, allegations of corruption and favoritism by President Lucas García, and a fraudulent election caused a crisis within the military that led to the March 1982 coup d'état. It involved junior officers, the extreme right, business interests, and the CIA, putting General Efraín Ríos Montt into power.

An official state of siege lasted from April 1982 to March 1983. The Guatemalan Armed Forces were increased in size from 27,000 to 36,000 active troops, and underwent a reorganization in May 1983. Nine military zones that existed previously were reorganized into nineteen zones, with new zones created in the areas with the most insurgent activity. The Army General Staff became the National Defense General Staff. For the campaigns starting from 1982, the General Staff directly oversaw the military zones on an hourly basis.

Military zones provided regional command and control during the counter-insurgency operations. Brigades existed alongside zones, and included three "strategic" brigades: the Mariscal Zavala Brigade, the Special Operations Brigade, and the Honor Guard Brigade. In addition to the formal structure, a second hierarchy emerged in areas of high guerrilla activity: task forces and areas of operation that answered directly to the General Staff instead of zone or brigade commanders. Each task force consisted of soldiers rotated from strategic units such as the Mariscal Zaval Brigade, the Honor Guard Brigade, the Air Force Tactical Group, the paratroopers of the airborne battalions, or the Kaibiles of the Special Operations Brigade. Also rotated through task forces were soldiers of regular Ground Forces battalions, members of the Navy or the Air Force, and reservists from all three services, who were called up in 1982.

They were augmented by various police forces, including the Mobile Military Police under the Ministry of Defense, and civilian militias known as Civil Defense Patrols. The Mobile Military Police surveilled the population during the war, along with the National Police, which was put under military control in 1982. The Civil Defense Patrols, formalized in 1983, and with a membership that may have been as high as 1.3 million, provided an intelligence network for the regular military and conducted operations in support of the counter-insurgency. Its members also committed human rights violations. Many joined the Civil Defense Patrols to avoid punishment by the military.

Starting from April 1982, the military launched a series of offensives against the insurgents based on its new "pacification and reconciliation" National Security Doctrine, with a focus on destroying the rebel strongholds among the Mayan population of the central highlands. These included several major campaigns: Plan Victory '82, Plan Strength '83, and Plan Stabilization '84. The course of the campaigns included ad hoc military trials against criminals and guerillas, scorched earth policies that destroyed over 400 villages, and an attempted restructuring of the economic, cultural and settlement patterns of the four million Mayans in the highlands to bring them under direct military rule. These campaigns resulted in many atrocities and the massacre of 75,000 people, mostly in the eight months from April to November 1982, and in the departments of Chimaltenango, Quiché, Huehuetenango, and Alta and Baja Verapaz. The National Security Doctrine was replaced by the National Stability Doctrine in 1986, but the same basic principles were followed, including controlling the civilian population. The Year-End Offensive '86 gathered the remaining population from guerilla-controlled areas, and was followed by Plan Unity '88 and Plan Advance '90, which focused on waging information warfare and preventing contact between the population and the insurgents.

The military allowed a civilian government to be formed in 1986, led by Vinicio Cerezo, to improve its international legitimacy while allowing it to continue the war. In the early 1990s, though the campaigns continued to achieve tactical successes against the rebels, the military began to lose political influence due to its atrocities receiving more scrutiny and economic changes taking place in the country. Its Comprehensive Peace Plan '90 recognized the main rebel group, the Guatemalan National Revolutionary Union (URNG), as a legitimate partner for peace talks. The officer corps began to split between those fighting the war and those waiting for peace talks. In the meantime, offensive operations resumed in 1992, and military doctrine continued to focus on counter-insurgency campaigns intended to restore internal stability. In 1993 an attempt by President Jorge Serrano Elías to take absolute power with the support of the armed forces high command faced intense opposition within Guatemala, including from moderate army officers. The conclusion of the peace process was the signing of the "Agreement on a Firm and Lasting Peace" on 29 December 1996.

Military human rights violations were not prosecuted until 2008, when the first cases from the civil war resulted in convictions. Between 2015 to 2019 at least 30 former military personnel were convicted for war crimes. Overall, the war resulted in the deaths of 200,000 people and the displacement of another 1.5 million. In 2013, retired general Efrían Ríos Montt became the first former head of state to be convicted of genocide in a national court, for his actions while commanding the military from 1982 to 1983.

=== Post-civil war development ===
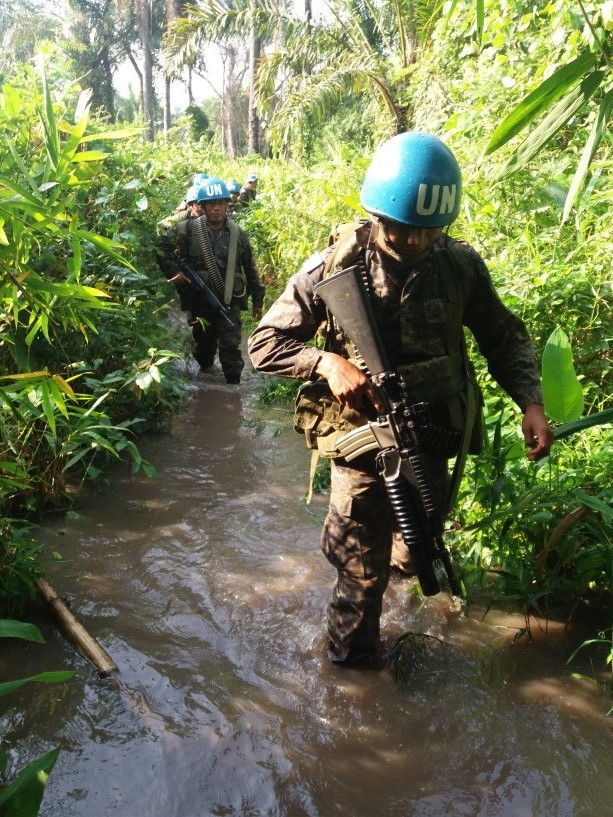
Guatemalan soldiers conducting reconnaissance to collect information on armed group activities in Dungu, Haut-Uélé Province, DR Congo, on 31 July 2017.

The peace accords included a number of measures intended to place the military under civilian control and to change its focus strictly to external defense. The military began working on a new official doctrine in March 1997 and published it in December 1999. It affirmed respect for the constitution, human rights, and the peace accords, and that its mission was the defense of the sovereignty and territorial integrity of Guatemala. However, the requirements of the peace agreement were not fully implemented. The constitution undermines civilian control by requiring the minister of defense to be an active officer, and by stating that internal security is one of the responsibilities of the army, without placing any limitations on that role. A constitutional amendment requiring the minister of defense to be a civilian was included in a package of 52 amendments based on the peace accords, and was rejected by Guatemalan voters in the May 1999 referendum.

Some structural changes were made in accordance with the military's primary role of external defense. The Mobile Military Police and the Civil Defense Patrols were disbanded; the military-controlled National Police and Treasury Police were replaced by a national civilian police, and the structure of nineteen military zones and three strategic brigades was reformed. Four zones that created a larger military presence in areas of high insurgent activity were dissolved: Zones 4 and 8 in April 1997, Zone 9 in June 1997, and Zone 14 in July 1997. The authorized strength of the armed forces was reduced from 46,900 at the end of the war to 31,423 as of 2000, with the demobilization of personnel and units, including 22 infantry battalions. In December 1999 the Guatemalan Army Doctrine established new military regions above zones as its major operational commands: eight regions for the land forces, three regions for the air force (centered on three air force bases), and two naval regions (one on each coast). The regions are bettered aligned for external defense, all of them having part of Guatemala's border or coastline, and facilitate a military response to natural disasters.

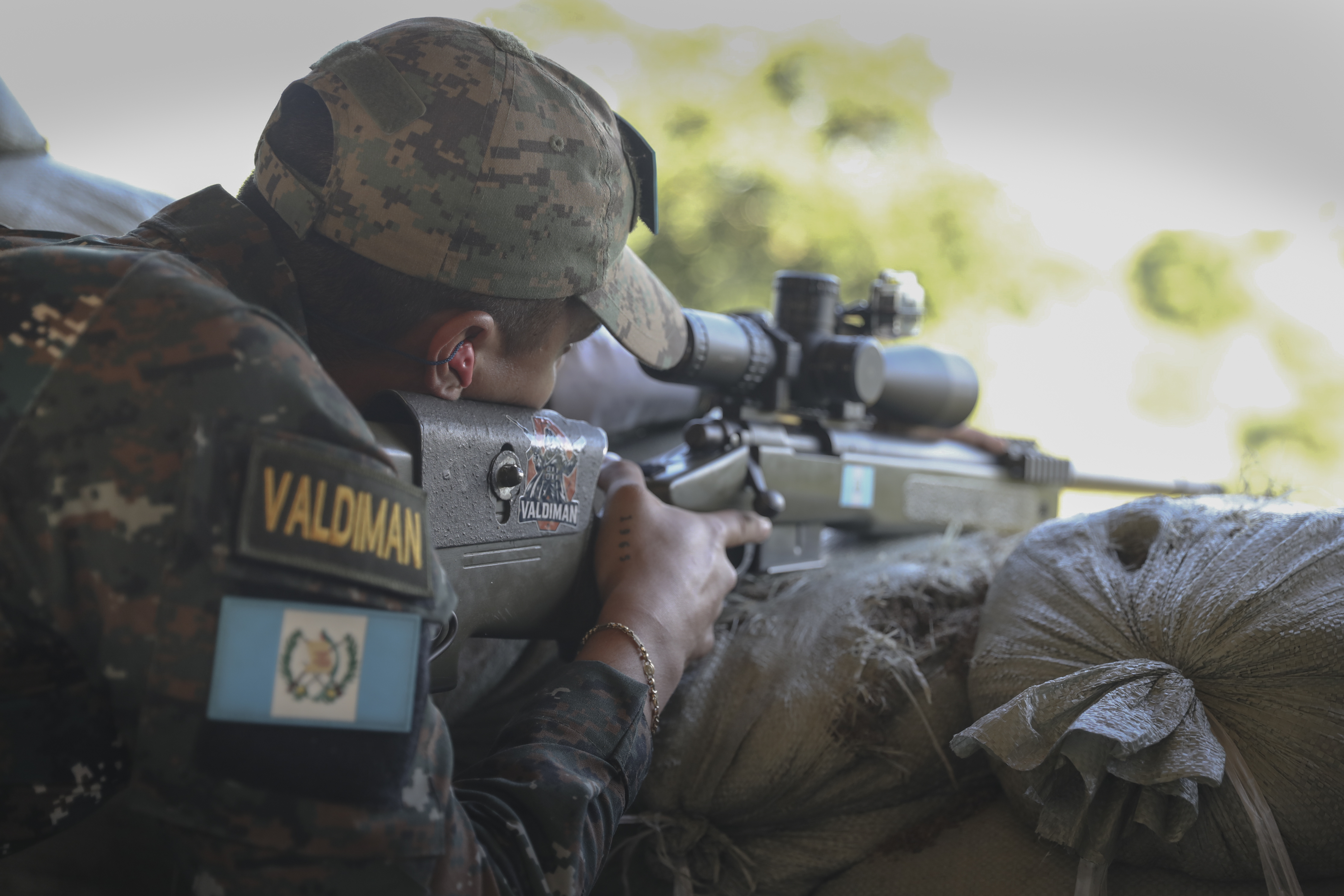
A Guatemalan special operations team member scans for targets during a sniper stage of Fuerzas Comando 2025 at Ilopango, El Salvador, on 22 August 2025.

Guatemalan troops took part in the U.S.-led Operation Uphold Democracy and the United Nations Mission in Haiti from 1994 to 1996. Guatemala experienced Central America's highest rise in organized crime starting from the 1990s, which reached the point of irregular warfare against government institutions. The factions involved included Mexican cartels like the Sinaloa and the Los Zetas, a network of corrupt local elites known as "hidden powers," and transnational local gangs such as MS-13, which took advantage of the post-civil war disarray to dramatically expand their activities. The military was put to use in anti-organized crime operations from the early 2000s, because the National Civil Police was severely outgunned and outmatched by gangs. These operations have included members of Kaibiles special forces. Guatemalan troops also served in MONUSCO during the Ituri conflict in the Democratic Republic of the Congo. Eight Guatemalan soldiers were killed in the Ituri District during an attempt to capture a leading member of the Lord's Resistance Army on 23 January 2006.

Although the administration of Alvaro Arzú made some progress towards increasing civilian control of the military from 1996 to 2000, his successor Alfonso Portillo, from 2000 to 2004, began undoing his work, and along with his ally and retired general Ríos Montt expanded its budget and mission. From 2004 President Óscar Berger reduced the size of the military further, to 15,000 personnel, and its budget. In 2010, the armed forces had 15,212 active and 63,863 reserve personnel. However, the Guatemalan military continues to have a high degree of autonomy from the political class. The president from 2012 to 2015, Otto Pérez Molina, was a retired general, and the following administrations of Jimmy Morales and Alejandro Giammattei also depended heavily on the military. In January 2025 Guatemalan soldiers were sent to Haiti for the Multination Security Support Mission.

== Structure ==
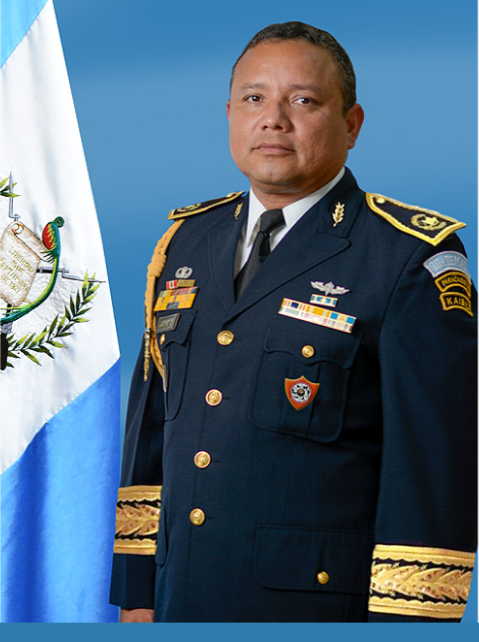
Henry Sáenz Ramos
Minister of National Defense

The Armed Forces of Guatemala are professional, apolitical, and non-deliberative; consist of ground, air, and naval forces; and are responsible for defending the sovereignty and independence of Guatemala. Their constitutional role includes both internal and external security. In addition to the constitution, the armed forces are governed by their Constituent Law and other regulations. The President of the Republic is the commander-in-chief of the armed forces and conveys orders through the Minister of National Defense, who is an army or air force general officer or colonel, or an equivalent rank in the navy. The defense minister is responsible for formulating policy and enforcing the legal requirements related to the mission of the armed forces.

Within the Ministry of National Defense, the National Defense General Staff (Estado General de la Defensa Nacional) oversees the military command structure. Led by the Chief of the General Staff and two deputies, it consists of five directorates: Personnel (D-1), Intelligence (D-2), Operations (D-3), Logistics (D-4), and Civil Affairs (D-5). There is also an inspector-general. The Chief of the National Defense General Staff is responsible to the Minister of National Defense for the command, organization, training, discipline, conduct, and tactical and strategic deployment of the armed forces. The president, the defense minister, and the chief of staff make up the High Command.

In the May 1983 reorganization of the military, the National Defense General Staff replaced the Army General Staff (Estado Mayor General del Ejército), which had consisted of sections G-1 through G-5, as well as the separate navy and air force staffs. The Guatemalan armed forces have a combined structure in which the army provides logistical support to the navy and air force.

=== Army ===
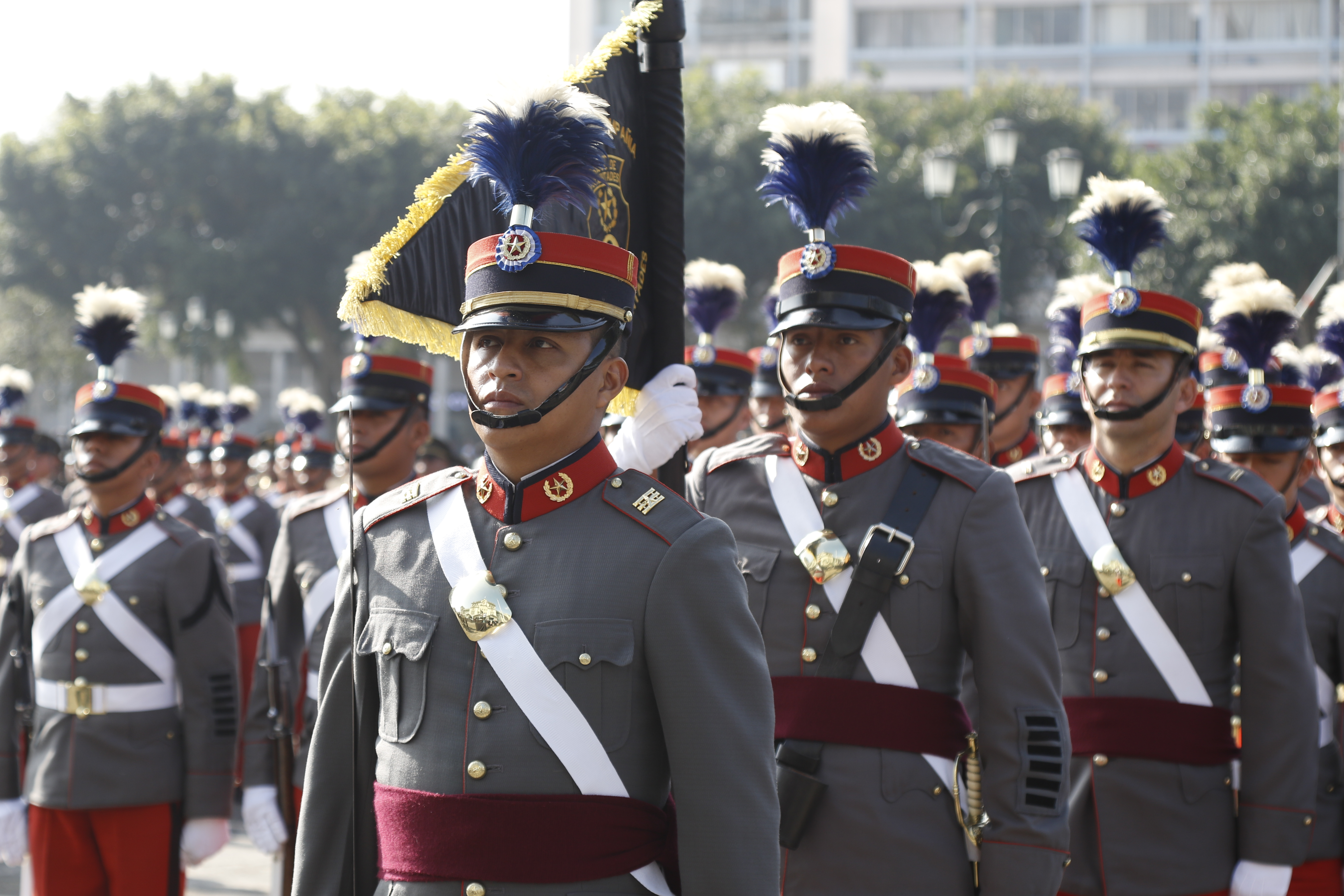
Soldiers of the Presidential Honor Guard, on 15 January 2024.

The Land Army of Guatemala (Ejército de Tierra de Guatemala) or Ground Forces (Fuerzas de Tierra del Ejército de Guatemala) has historically been the largest and most powerful branch, and the other services are integrated with it. Because of this, the term "army" is sometimes used interchangeably with "armed forces" to refer to the entire military. Ground Forces (Fuerzas de Tierra) is the specific term for the land branch. In 2024, the army had 15,550 active and 62,300 reserve personnel, and its maneuver units consisted of six infantry brigades, one mechanized brigade, one airborne brigade, three special forces brigades, two military police brigades, two engineer battalions, and a presidential guard battalion. There were also 19 reserve infantry battalions.

The structure of the army includes the following:

- 1st Infantry Brigade "General Luis García León"
- 2nd Infantry Brigade "Captain General Rafael Carrera"
- 3rd Infantry Brigade "General Manuel Aguilar Santamaría"
- 4th Infantry Brigade "General Justo Rufino Barrios"
- 5th Infantry Brigade "Mariscal Gregorio Solares"
- 6th Infantry Brigade "Colonel Antonio José de Isarri"
- Brigade "Mariscal Zavala"
- Parachute Brigade "General Felipe Cruz"
- Special Forces Brigade
- Jungle Operations Brigade
- Mountain Operations Brigade
- Military Police Brigade "Honor Guard"
- 2nd Military Police Brigade "Divisional General Héctor Alejandro Gramajo Morales"
- Field Artillery Brigade
- Army Engineer Corps "Lieutenant Colonel of Engineers Francisco Vela Arango"
- Communications and Information Command
- Central Regional Command
- Eastern Regional Command
- Presidential Guard

There are also 15 military zones.

=== Navy ===
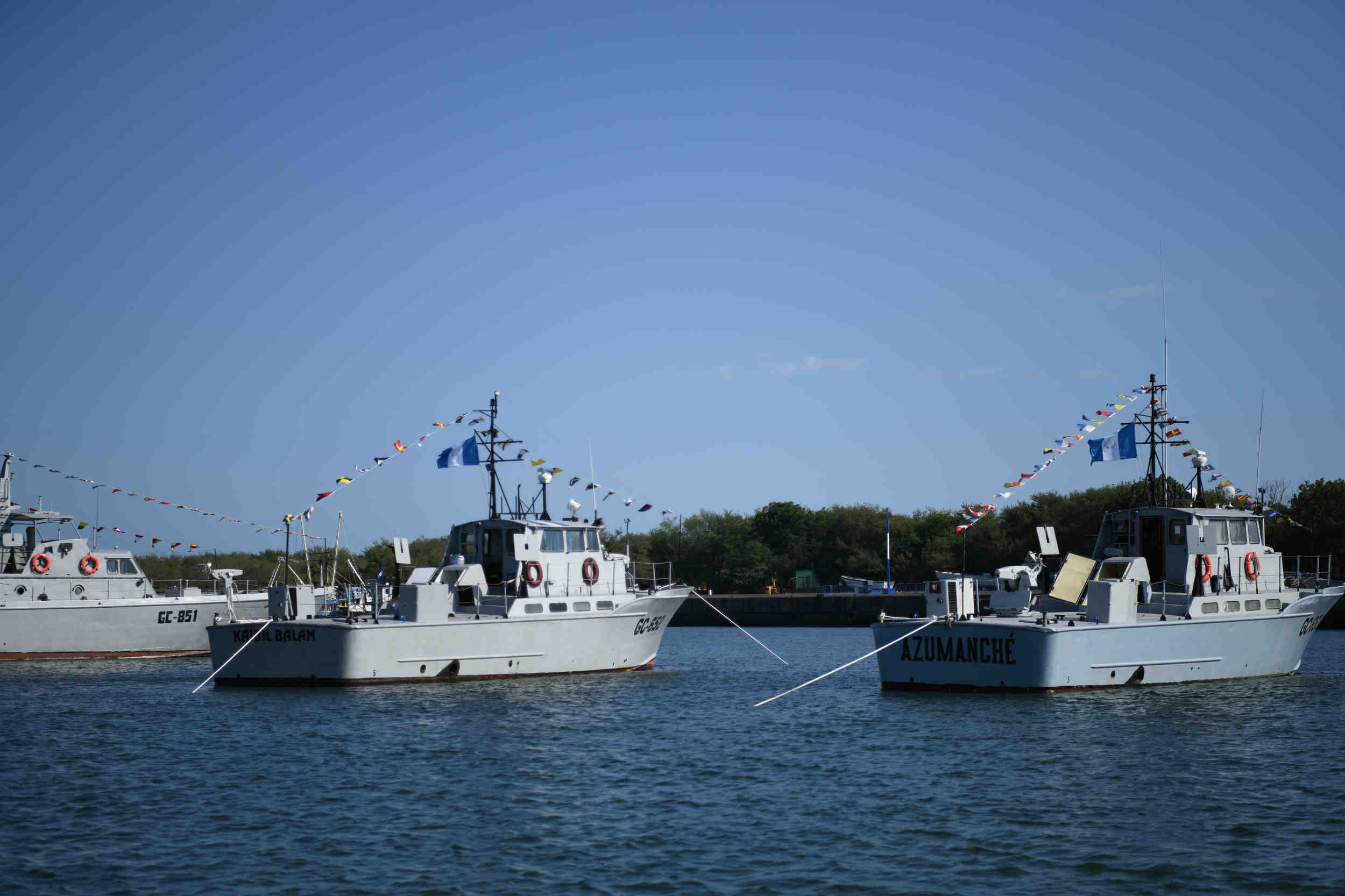
Ships of the Guatemalan navy on its 65th anniversary, 20 January 2024.

The Navy of Guatemala (Armada de Guatemala) or National Defense Navy (Marina de la Defensa Nacional) has two naval regions and bases, Atlántico and Pacifico, located at Santo Tomás de Castilla and Puerto Quetzal, respectively. In 2024, the Navy had 1,500 active and 650 reserve personnel, and its forces included one marine brigade and two reserve marine battalions. The fleet consists of ten patrol boats of various types, three amphibious landing craft, and three auxiliary ships.

=== Air Force ===
The Guatemalan Air Force (Fuerza Aérea Guatemalteca) consists of two air commands and three air bases, located at Guatemala City (La Aurora Air Base), Santa Elena Petén (Air Base North), and Retalhuleu (Air Base South). As of 2024, the Air Force had 1,000 active and 900 reserve personnel, and 25 aircraft, though it was estimated that less than half of them are serviceable. Its tactical organization included two transport squadrons, one training squadron, and one helicopter squadron. There was also a military hospital and an air force military police unit.

== Equipment ==
As of 2024 the inventory of the Guatemalan Armed Forces includes the following:

- 46 armored fighting vehicles, including M8 light tanks, M113 APCs, Commandos, and Armadillos
- 149 artillery pieces, including M-56 and M101 howitzers
- 32 anti-aircraft artillery pieces, including Zastava M55s

== Works cited ==
- Brands, Hal (2010). "Crime, Violence, and the Crisis in Guatemala: A Case Study in the Erosion of the State". Strategic Studies Institute, U.S. Army War College. JSTOR resresp11425.
- Fry, Michael F. (2018). Historical Dictionary of Guatemala. Lanham, Maryland: Rowman & Littlefield. ISBN 978-1-5381-1130-7.
- Grieb, Kenneth J. (1976). "The Guatemalan Military and the Revolution of 1944". The Americas. 32 (4): 524–43. JSTOR 979829.
- International Institute for Strategic Studies (2010). The Military Balance 2010. London: Routledge.
- International Institute for Strategic Studies (2024). The Military Balance 2024. London: Routledge. ISBN 978-1-032-78004-7.
- Jenkins, Brian; Sereseres, Caesar D. (1977). "U.S. Military Assistance and the Guatemalan Armed Forces". Armed Forces & Society. 3 (4): 575–94. JSTOR 45346036.
- Karlen, Stefan (1994). ""Make the Escuela Politécnica as near like West Point as Possible." Jorge Ubico and the Professionalization of the Guatemalan Military, 1931 - 1944". Ibero-Amerikanisches Archiv. 20 (1/2): 109–51. JSTOR 43392683.
- Martinez, Rafael; Nino, Oriana (2023). "Civil-Military Relations: Is the Guatemalan Military a Democratic Institution?". In Sanchez-Siboney, Omar (ed.). State–Society Relations in Guatemala: Theory and Practice. Lanham, Maryland: Rowman & Littlefield. ISBN 978-1-6669-1009-4.
- Patterson, Franklin (1988). "The Guatemalan Military And the Escuela Politécnica". Armed Forces & Society. 14 (3): 359–90. JSTOR 45305002.
- Ruhl, J. Mark (2005). "The Guatemalan Military since the Peace Accords: The Fate of Reform under Arzú and Portillo". Latin American Politics and Society. 47 (1): 55–85. JSTOR 4490389.
- Saenz, James E. (2001). "The Guatemalan Military: Transition from War to Peace" (PDF). Fort Leavenworth, Kansas: U.S. Army Command and General Staff College.
- Schirmer, Jennifer G. (1998). The Guatemalan Military Project: A Violence Called Democracy. Philadelphia, Pennsylvania: University of Pennsylvania Press. ISBN 0-8122-3325-5.
- "Constitution of Guatemala". Comparative Constitute Project. Translated by Valle Velasco, Luis Francisco. 2012.
