= Guatemalan Civil War =

1960–1996 conflict

- Part of the Central American crisis and Cold War
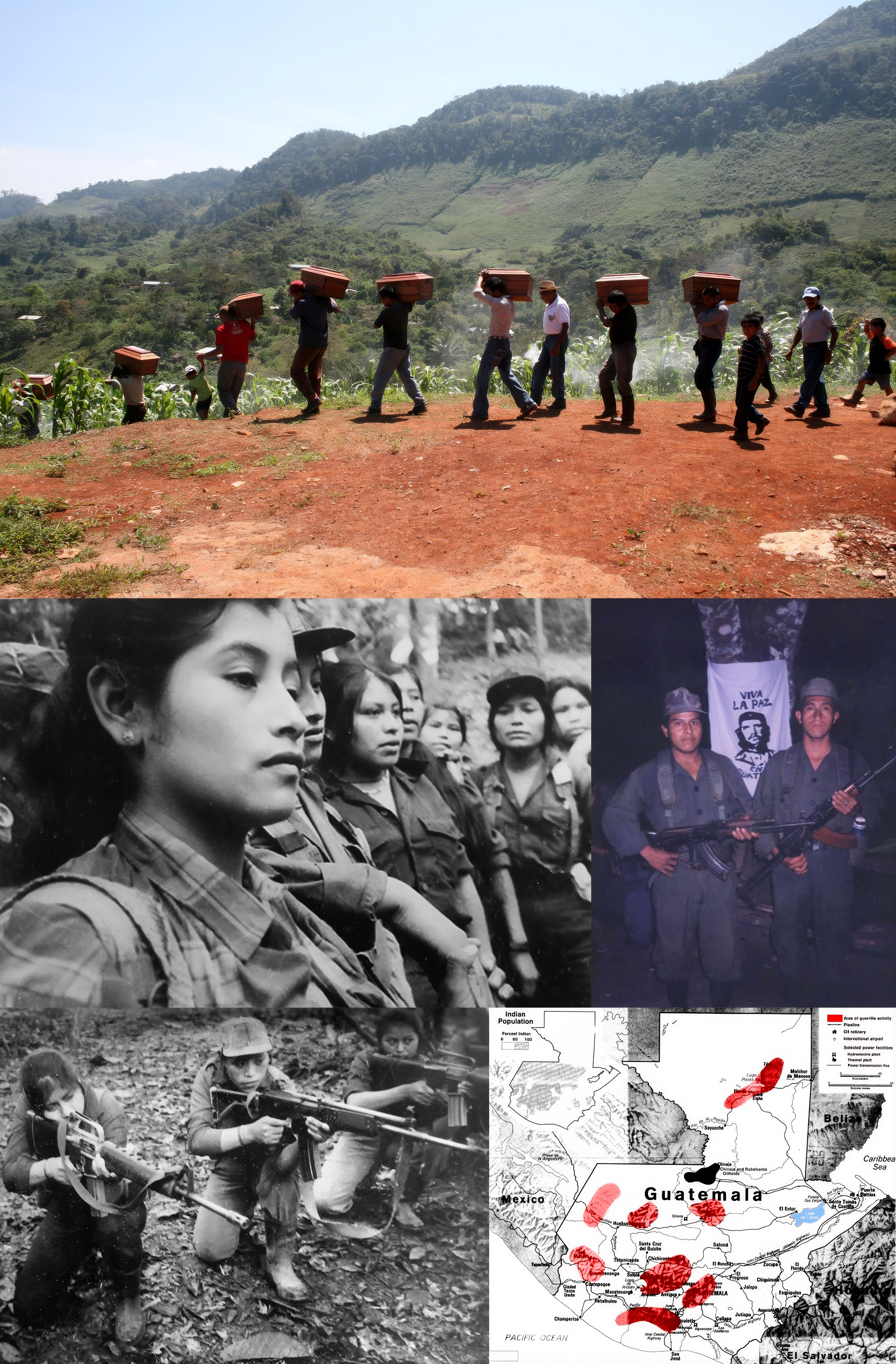
- From top to bottom and left to right: Families carrying their loved ones' remains in Alta Verapaz; People's Army of the Poor (EGP) guerrillas; ORPA soldiers holding AK-47s; EGP combatants defending a position; Map of hostile activity
Date	13 November 1960 – 29 December 1996 (36 years, 1 month, 2 weeks and 2 days)
Location	Guatemala
Result	Peace accord signed in 1996
Territorial changes	Creation and military control of the Franja Transversal del Norte

Belligerents
Government of Guatemala and Guatemalan military Government-led paramilitary organizations: Mano Blanca; Civil Defense Patrols; Supported by: United States (1962–1996); Argentina (1976–1983) Logistics: Israel; Taiwan; Chile (1973–1990); South Africa (until 1994)	URNG (from 1982); PGT (until 1998); MR-13 (1960–1971); FAR (1962–1971); EGP (1971–1996); ORPA (1979–1996) Supported by: Cuba; FMLN; Nicaragua (1979–1990)

Commanders and leaders
Miguel Ydígoras #; Enrique Peralta; Julio Méndez #; Carlos Arana; Kjell Laugerud; Romeo Lucas; Efraín Ríos Montt; Óscar Mejía; Vinicio Cerezo; Jorge Serrano; Ramiro de León; Álvaro Arzú	Rolando Morán; Rodrigo Asturias; Luis Turcios †; Marco Yon †; Bernardo Alvarado †; Ricardo Rosales

Strength
Military: 51,600 (1985); 45,000 (1994); Paramilitary: 300,000 (1982); 500,000 (1985); 32,000 (1986)	URNG: 6,000 (1982); 1,500–3,000 (1994)

Casualties and losses
- 40,000–200,000 dead and missing

The Guatemalan Civil War (Spanish: Guerra civil de Guatemala) was fought from 1960 to 1996 between the government of Guatemala and various leftist rebel groups. The Guatemalan government forces committed genocide against the Maya population of Guatemala during the civil war and there were widespread human rights violations against civilians. The context of the struggle was based on longstanding issues over land distribution. Wealthy Guatemalans, mainly of European descent, and foreign companies like the American United Fruit Company had control over much of the land leading to conflicts with the rural, disproportionately indigenous, peasants who worked the land.

Democratic elections in 1944 and 1951 which were during the Guatemalan Revolution had brought popular leftist governments to power, who sought to ameliorate working conditions and implement land distribution. A United States-backed coup d'état in 1954 installed the military regime of Carlos Castillo Armas to prevent reform. Armas was followed by a series of right-wing military dictators.

The Civil War began on 13 November 1960, when a group of left-wing junior military officers led a failed revolt against the government of General Ydígoras Fuentes. The officers who survived created a rebel movement known as MR-13. In 1970, Colonel Carlos Manuel Arana Osorio was the first of a series of military dictators who represented the Institutional Democratic Party or PID. The PID dominated Guatemalan politics for twelve years through electoral frauds favoring two of Colonel Arana's protégés (General Kjell Eugenio Laugerud García in 1974 and General Romeo Lucas Garcia in 1978). The PID lost its grip on Guatemalan politics when General Efraín Ríos Montt along with a group of junior army officers, seized power in a military coup on 23 March 1982. In the 1970s social discontent continued among the large populations of indigenous people and peasants. Many organized into insurgent groups and began to resist government forces.

During the 1980s, the Guatemalan military assumed close to absolute government power for five years; it successfully infiltrated and eliminated enemies in every socio-political institution of the nation including the political, social, and intellectual classes. In the final stage of the civil war, the military developed a parallel, semi-visible, and low profile but high-effect control of Guatemala's national life. It is estimated that 40,000 to 200,000 people were killed or "disappeared" forcefully during the conflict including 40,000 to 50,000 disappearances. Fighting took place between government forces and rebel groups, yet much of the violence was a very large coordinated campaign of one-sided violence by the Guatemalan state against the civilian population from the mid-1960s onward. The military intelligence services coordinated killings and "disappearances" of opponents of the state.

In rural areas, where the insurgency maintained its strongholds, the government repression led to large massacres of the peasantry and the destruction of villages, first in the departments of Izabal and Zacapa (1966–68) and in the predominantly Mayan western highlands from 1978 onward. The widespread killing of the Mayan people in the early 1980s is considered a genocide. Other victims of the repression included activists, suspected government opponents, returning refugees, critical academics, students, left-leaning politicians, trade unionists, religious workers, journalists, and street children. The "Comisión para el Esclarecimiento Histórico" estimated that government forces committed 93% of human right abuses in the conflict, with 3% committed by the guerrillas.

In 2009, Guatemalan courts sentenced former military commissioner Felipe Cusanero, the first person to be convicted of the crime of ordering forced disappearances. In 2013, the government conducted a trial of former president Efraín Ríos Montt on charges of genocide for the killing and disappearances of more than 1,700 indigenous Ixil Maya during his 1982–83 rule. The charges of genocide were based on the "Memoria del Silencio" report–prepared by the UN-appointed Commission for Historical Clarification. It was also the first time that the court recognized the rape and abuse which Mayan women suffered. Of the 1465 cases of rape that were reported, soldiers were responsible for 94.3 percent. The Commission concluded that the government could have committed genocide in Quiché between 1981 and 1983. Ríos Montt was the first former head of state to be tried for genocide by his own country's judicial system; he was found guilty and sentenced to 80 years in prison. A few days later, however, the sentence was reversed by the country's high court. They called for a renewed trial because of alleged judicial anomalies. The trial resumed on 23 July 2015, but the jury had not reached a verdict before Montt died in custody on 1 April 2018.

== Background ==
After the 1871 revolution, the Liberal government of Justo Rufino Barrios escalated coffee production in Guatemala, which required much land and many workers. Barrios established the Settler Rule Book, which forced the native population to work for low wages for the landowners, who were Criollos and later German settlers. Barrios also confiscated the common native land, which had been protected during the Spanish Colony and during the Conservative government of Rafael Carrera. He distributed it to his Liberal friends, who became major landowners.

In the 1890s, the United States began to implement the Monroe Doctrine, pushing out European colonial powers in Latin America. Its commercial interests established U.S. hegemony over resources and labor in the region. The dictators that ruled Guatemala during the late 19th and early 20th centuries were very accommodating to U.S. business and political interests, because they personally benefitted. Unlike in Haiti, Nicaragua, and Cuba, the U.S. did not have to use overt military force to maintain dominance in Guatemala. The Guatemalan military/police worked closely with the U.S. military and State Department to secure U.S. interests. The Guatemalan government exempted several U.S. corporations from paying taxes, especially the United Fruit Company. It also privatized and sold off publicly owned utilities giving away huge swaths of public land.

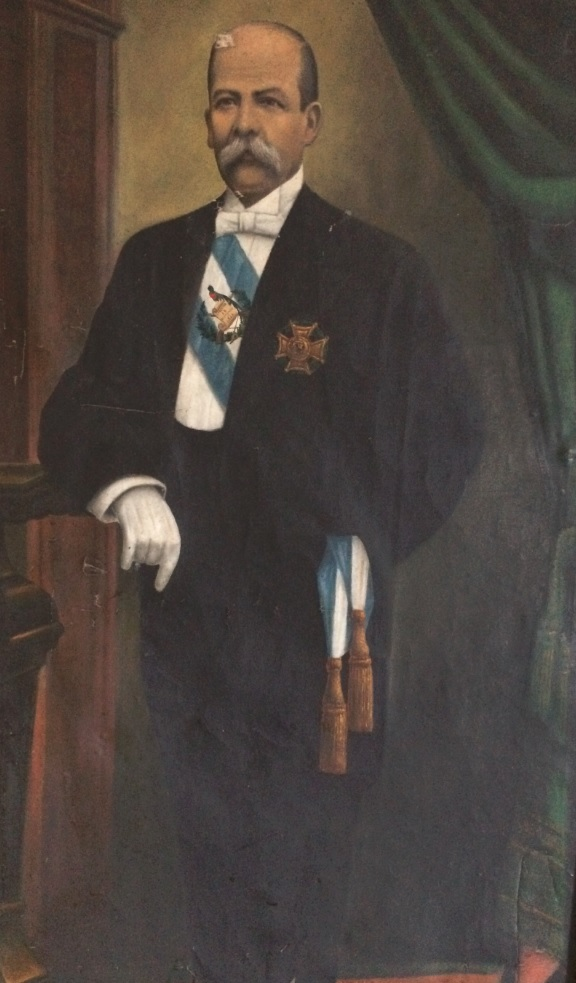
President Manuel Estrada Cabrera's official portrait from his last presidential term; during his government, the American United Fruit Company became a major economic and political force in Guatemala

=== Societal structure ===
In 1920, the prince Wilhelm of Sweden visited Guatemala and described Guatemalan society and Estrada Cabrera government in his book Between Two Continents, notes from a journey in Central America, 1920. He analyzed Guatemalan society at the time, pointing out that even though it called itself a "republic", Guatemala had three sharply defined classes:

- Criollos: A minority made up of descendants of the Spaniards who conquered Central America; by 1920, the Criollos made up much of the members of both political parties and the elite in the country. For centuries they had intermarried with indigenous peoples and other people of European ancestry. The great majority had some indigenous ancestry but largely identified with European culture. They led the country both politically and intellectually, partly because their education was far superior to that of most of the rest of the residents. Only criollos were admitted to the main political parties; their families largely controlled and for the most part owned the cultivated parts of the country.
- Ladinos: Descendants of peoples of mixed indigenous and European or criollo ancestry, so called because they spoke Spanish as a first language. They were typically middle class, but held almost no political power in 1920. They made up the bulk of artisans, storekeepers, tradesmen, and minor officials. In the eastern part of the country, they worked as agricultural laborers. They sometimes had African ancestry.
- Indigenous peoples: The majority of the population at the time was composed of native or indigenous Guatemalans, most of whom were Mayan peoples. Many had little to no formal education and were illiterate. Indigenous people served as soldiers for the Army and they were often raised to positions of considerable trust. They made up most of the agricultural workers.

The prince classified them into three categories:

- "Mozos colonos" (farmer-servants) settled on the plantations and were given a small piece of land to cultivate on their own account, in return for work in the plantations a certain number of months a year, similar to sharecroppers or tenant farmers in the US.
- "Mozos jornaleros" (day laborers) were contracted to work for certain periods of time. They were paid a daily wage. In theory, each "mozo" was free to dispose of his labor as he or she pleased, but they were bound to the property by economic ties. They could not leave until they had paid off their debt to the owner. They were often victimized by owners, who encouraged them to get into debt by granting credit or lending cash. The owners recorded the accounts and the mozos were usually illiterate and at a disadvantage. If the mozos ran away, the owner could have them pursued and imprisoned by the authorities. Associated costs would be added to the ever-increasing debt of the mozo. If one of them refused to work, he or she was put in prison on the spot. The wages were also extremely low. The work was done by contract, but since every "mozo" starts with a large debt, the usual advance on engagement, effectively they became servants indentured to the landowner.
- "Artesanos independientes" (independent tillers) lived in the most remote provinces. Often Mayan, they survived by growing maize, wheat, or beans. They tried to cultivate some of the excess to sell in the market areas of the towns. They often carried their goods on their back for up to 40 kilometres (25 mi) a day to reach such markets.

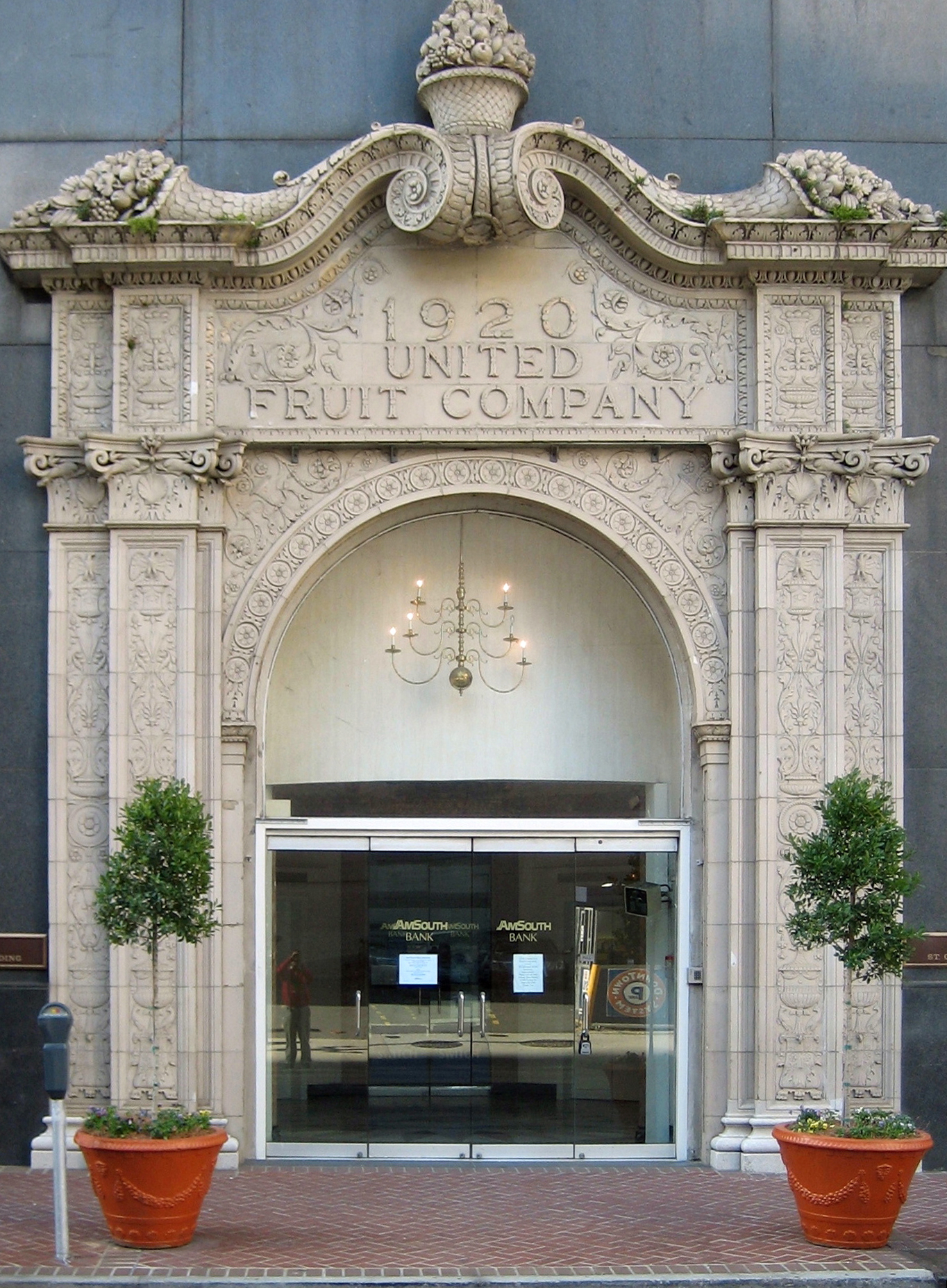
Entrance to the United Fruit Company headquarters. The multinational fruit company launched the coup over the distribution of vacant land.

=== Jorge Ubico regime ===
In 1931, the dictator General Jorge Ubico came to power, backed by the United States. While an efficient administrator, he initiated one of the most brutally repressive military regimes in Central American history. Just as Estrada Cabrera had done during his government, Ubico created a widespread network of spies and informants and had political opponents tortured and put to death. A wealthy aristocrat (with an estimated income of $215,000 per year in 1930s dollars) and a staunch anti-communist, he consistently sided with the United Fruit Company, Guatemalan landowners and urban elites in disputes with peasants. After the crash of the New York Stock Exchange in 1929, the peasant system established by Barrios in 1875 to jump start coffee production in the country faltered, and Ubico was forced to implement a system of debt slavery and forced labor to make sure that there was enough labor available for the coffee plantations and that the UFCO workers were readily available. Allegedly, he passed laws allowing landowners to execute workers as a "disciplinary" measure. He also identified as a fascist; he admired Mussolini, Franco, and Hitler, saying at one point: "I am like Hitler. I execute first and ask questions later." Ubico was disdainful of the indigenous population, calling them "animal-like", and stated that to become "civilized" they needed mandatory military training, comparing it to "domesticating donkeys". He gave away hundreds of thousands of hectares to the United Fruit Company, exempted them from taxes in Tiquisate, and allowed the U.S. military to establish bases in Guatemala. Ubico considered himself to be "another Napoleon". He dressed ostentatiously and surrounded himself with statues and paintings of the emperor, regularly commenting on the similarities between their appearances. He militarized numerous political and social institutions—including the post office, schools, and even symphony orchestras—and placed military officers in charge of many government posts. He frequently travelled around the country performing "inspections" in dress uniform, followed by a military escort, a mobile radio station, an official biographer, and cabinet members.

After 14 years, Ubico's repressive policies and arrogant demeanor finally led to pacific disobedience by urban middle-class intellectuals, professionals, and junior army officers in 1944. On 1 July 1944, Ubico resigned from office amidst a general strike and nationwide protests. He had planned to hand over power to the former director of policy, General Roderico Anzueto, whom he felt he could control. But his advisors noted that Anzueto's pro-Nazi sympathies had made him unpopular and that he would not be able to control the military. So Ubico instead chose to select a triumvirate of Major General Buenaventura Piñeda, Major General Eduardo Villagrán Ariza, and General Federico Ponce Vaides. The three generals promised to convene the national assembly to hold an election for a provisional president, but when the congress met on 3 July, soldiers held everyone at gunpoint and forced them to vote for General Ponce rather than the popular civilian candidate, Dr. Ramón Calderón. Ponce, who had previously retired from military service due to alcoholism, took orders from Ubico and kept many of the officials who had worked in the Ubico administration. The repressive policies of the Ubico administration were continued.

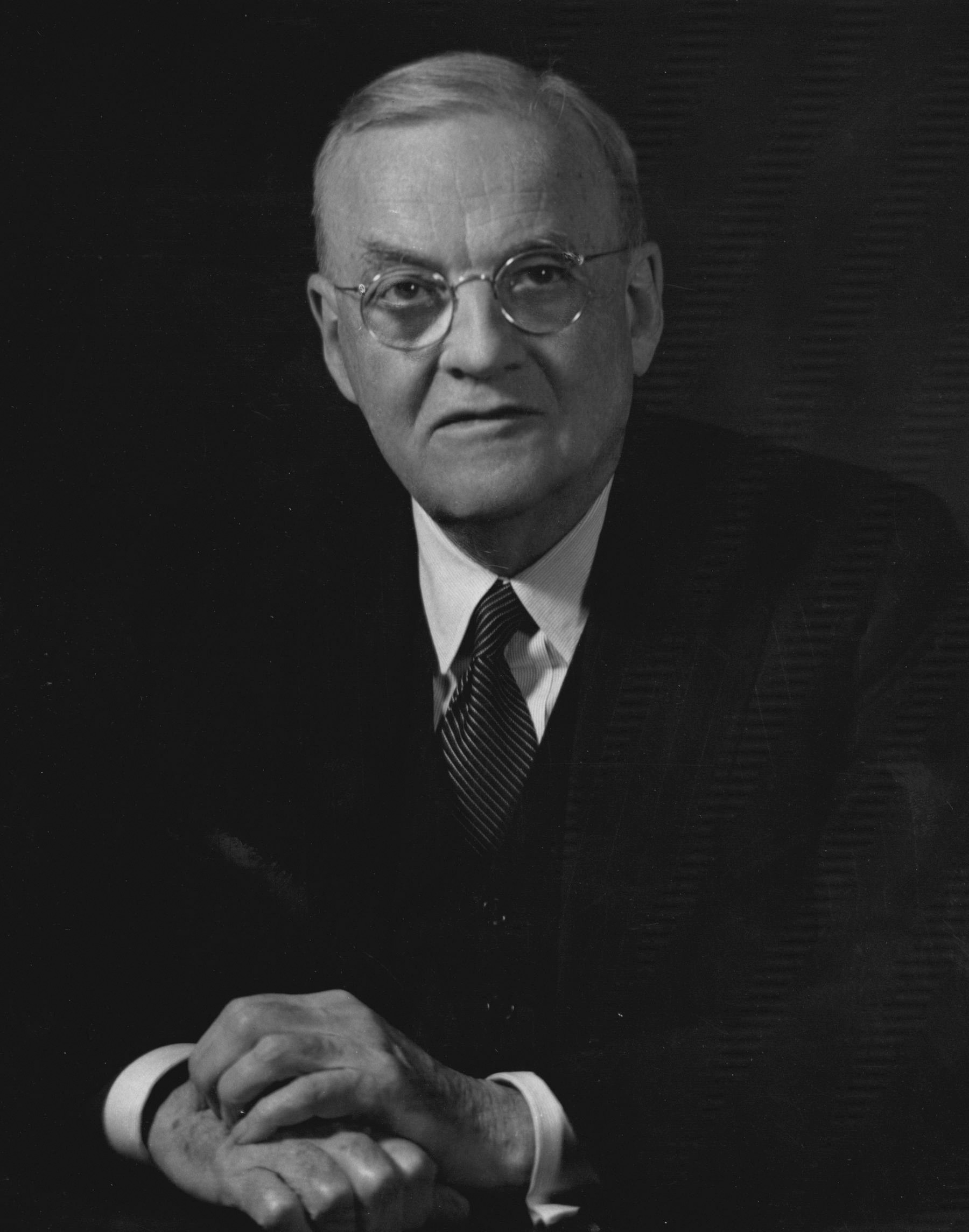
John Foster Dulles, Secretary of State of the Eisenhower administration and board member of the United Fruit Company.

Opposition groups began organizing again, this time joined by many prominent political and military leaders, who deemed the Ponce regime unconstitutional. Among the military officers in the opposition were Jacobo Árbenz and Major Francisco Javier Arana. Ubico had fired Árbenz from his teaching post at the Escuela Politécnica, and since then Árbenz had been living in El Salvador, organizing a band of revolutionary exiles. On 19 October 1944, a small group of soldiers and students led by Árbenz and Arana attacked the National Palace in what later became known as the "October Revolution". Ponce was defeated and driven into exile; Árbenz, Arana, and a lawyer named Jorge Toriello established a junta. They declared that democratic elections would be held before the end of the year.

The PGT, founded by José Manuel Fortuny in 1949, achieved great influence during the Árbenz government.

The winner of the 1944 elections was a teaching major named Juan José Arévalo, Ph.D., who had earned a scholarship in Argentina during the government of general Lázaro Chacón due to his superb professor skills. Arévalo remained in South America for a few years, working as a university professor in several countries. Back in Guatemala during the early years of the Jorge Ubico regime, his colleagues asked him to present a project to the president to create the Faculty of Humanism at the National University, to which Ubico was strongly opposed. Realizing the dictatorial nature of Ubico, Arévalo left Guatemala and went back to Argentina. He went back to Guatemala after the 1944 Revolution and ran under a coalition of leftist parties known as the Partido Acción Revolucionaria ("Revolutionary Action Party", PAR), and won 85 percent of the vote in elections that are widely considered to have been fair and open. Arévalo implemented social reforms, including minimum wage laws, increased educational funding, near-universal suffrage (excluding illiterate women), and labor reforms. But many of these changes only benefited the upper-middle classes and did little for the peasant agricultural laborers who made up the majority of the population. Although his reforms were relatively moderate, he was widely disliked by the United States government, portions of the Catholic Church, large landowners, employers such as the United Fruit Company, and Guatemalan military officers, who viewed his government as inefficient, corrupt, and heavily influenced by communists. At least 25 coup attempts took place during his presidency, mostly led by wealthy liberal military officers.

In 1944, the "October Revolutionaries" took control of the government. They instituted socialist economic reforms, benefiting and politically strengthening the civil and labor rights of the urban working class and the peasants. Elsewhere, a group of leftist students, professionals, and liberal-democratic government coalitions developed, led by Juan José Arévalo and Jacobo Árbenz Guzmán. Decree 900, passed in 1952, ordered the redistribution of fallow land on large estates, threatening the interests of the landowning elite and, mainly, the United Fruit Company.

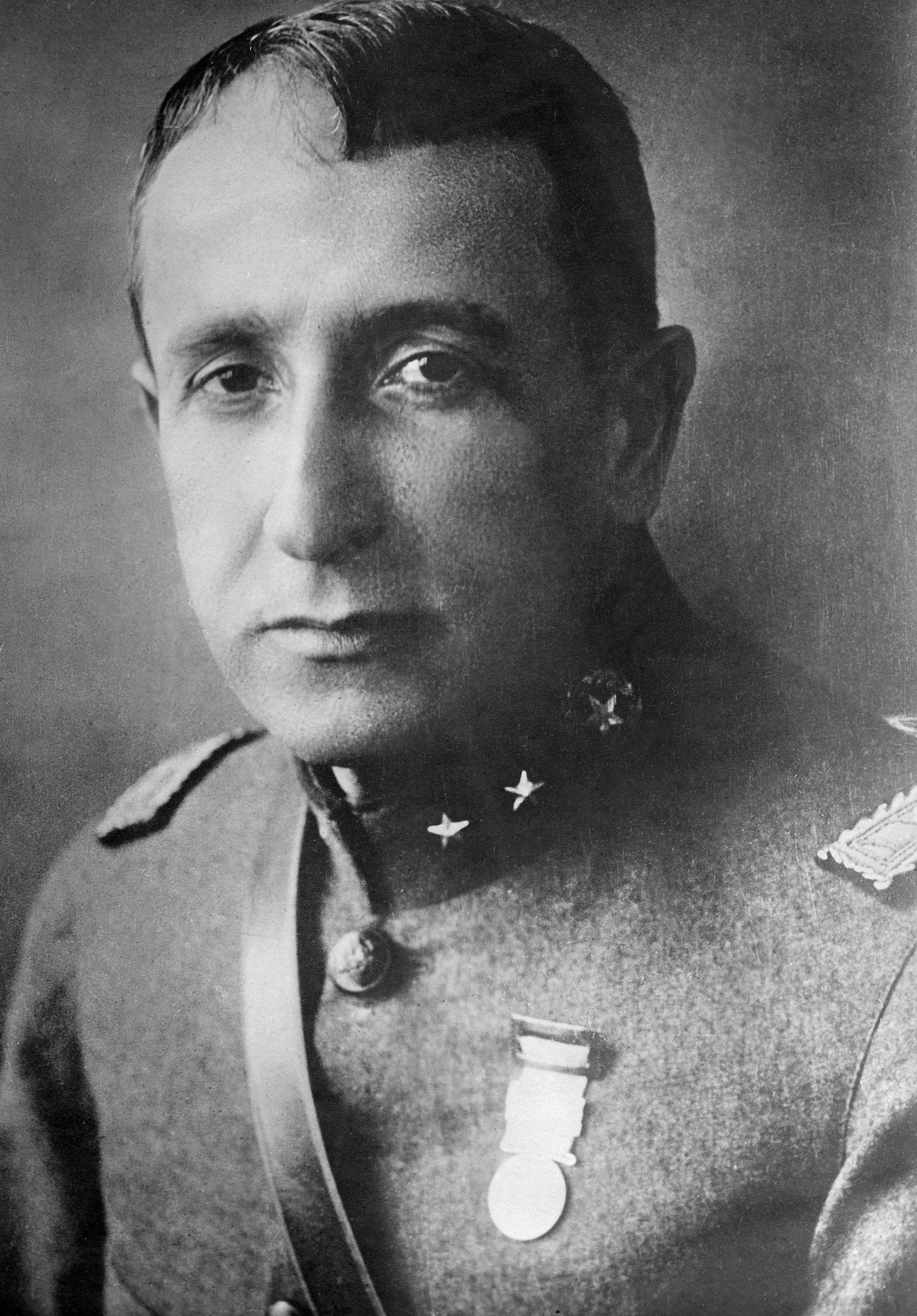
General Jorge Ubico Castañeda.

Given the strong ties of the UFCO with high Eisenhower administration officers such as the brothers John Foster Dulles and Allen Dulles, who were Secretary of State and Central Intelligence Agency (CIA) director, respectively, and were both in the company board, the U.S. government ordered the CIA to launch Operation PBFortune (1952–1954) and halt Guatemala's "communist revolt", as perceived by the United Fruit Company and the U.S. State Department. The CIA chose right-wing Guatemalan Army Colonel Carlos Castillo Armas to lead an "insurrection" in the 1954 Guatemalan coup d'état. Upon deposing the Árbenz Guzmán government, Castillo Armas began to dissolve a decade of social and economic reform and legislative progress, and banned labor unions and left-wing political parties, a disfranchisement of left-wing Guatemalans. He also returned all the confiscated land to the United Fruit and the elite landlords.

A series of military coups d'état followed, featuring fraudulent elections in which only military personnel were the winner candidates. Aggravating the general poverty and political repression motivating the civil war was the widespread socioeconomic discrimination and racism practiced against Guatemalan indigenous peoples, such as the Maya; many later fought in the civil war. Although the indigenous Guatemalans constitute more than half of the national populace, they were landless, having been dispossessed of their lands since the Justo Rufino Barrios times. The landlord upper classes of the oligarchy, generally descendants of Spanish and other Europe immigrants to Guatemala, although often with some mestizo ancestry as well, controlled most of the land after the Liberal Reform of 1871.

== Initial phase of the civil war: 1960s and early 1970s ==
On 13 November 1960, a group of left-wing junior military officers of the Escuela Politécnica national military academy led a failed revolt against the autocratic government (1958–63) of General Ydígoras Fuentes, who had usurped power in 1958, after the assassination of the incumbent Colonel Castillo Armas. The young officers' were outraged by the staggering corruption of the Ydígoras regime, the government's showing of favoritism in giving military promotions and other rewards to officers who supported Ydígoras, and what they perceived as incompetence in running the country. The immediate trigger for their revolt, however, was Ydígoras' decision to allow the U.S. to train an invasion force in Guatemala to prepare for the planned Bay of Pigs Invasion of Cuba without consulting the Guatemalan military and without sharing with the military the payoff he received in exchange from the U.S. government. The military was concerned about the infringement on the sovereignty of their country as unmarked U.S. warplanes piloted by US-based Cuban exiles flew in large numbers over their country and the U.S. established a secret airstrip and training camp at Retalhuleu to prepare for its invasion of Cuba. The rebellion was not ideological in its origins.

The CIA flew B-26 bombers disguised as Guatemalan military jets to bomb the rebel bases because the coup threatened U.S. plans for the invasion of Cuba as well as the Guatemalan regime it supported. The rebels fled to the hills of eastern Guatemala and neighboring Honduras and formed the kernel of what became known as MR-13 (Movimiento Revolucionario 13 Noviembre). The surviving officers fled into the hills of eastern Guatemala, and later established communication with the Cuban government of Fidel Castro. By 1962, those surviving officers had established an insurgent movement known as the MR-13, named after the date of the officers' revolt.

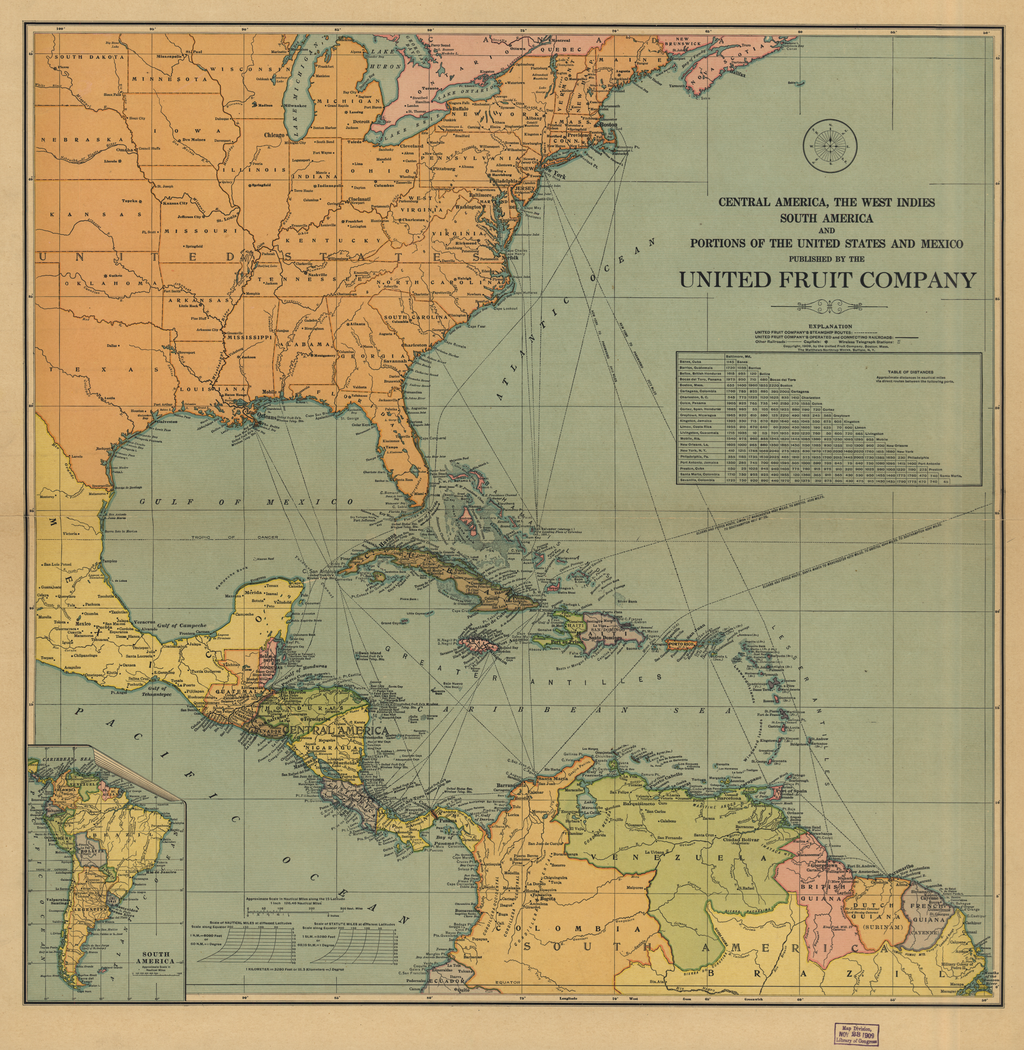
Map of the routes of the "White Fleet" of the United Fruit Company, which had the monopoly of transporting cargo and people to and from Puerto Barrios, after the generous concessions granted by Estrada Cabrera.

=== MR-13 attacks United Fruit Company office ===
They returned in early 1962, and on 6 February 1962 in Bananera they attacked the offices of the United Fruit Company (present-day Chiquita Brands), an American corporation that controlled vast territories in Guatemala as well as in other Central American countries. The attack sparked sympathetic strikes and university student walkouts throughout the country, to which the Ydígoras regime responded with a violent crackdown. This violent crackdown sparked the civil war.

Through the early phase of the conflict, the MR-13 was a principal component of the insurgent movement in Guatemala. The MR-13 later initiated contact with the outlawed PGT (Guatemalan Labour Party, composed and led by middle-class intellectuals and students) and a student organization called the Movimiento 12 de Abril (12 April Movement) and merged into a coalition guerrilla organization called the Rebel Armed Forces (FAR) in December 1962. Also affiliated with the FAR was the FGEI (Edgar Ibarra Guerrilla Front). The MR-13, PGT and the FGEI each operated in different parts of the country as three separate "frentes" (fronts); the MR-13 established itself in the mostly Ladino departments of Izabal and Zacapa, the FGEI established itself in Sierra de las Minas and the PGT operated as an urban guerrilla front. Each of these three "frentes" (comprising no more than 500 combatants) were led by former members of the 1960 army revolt, who had previously been trained in counterinsurgency warfare by the United States.

=== U.S. intelligence and counterinsurgency assistance to government ===
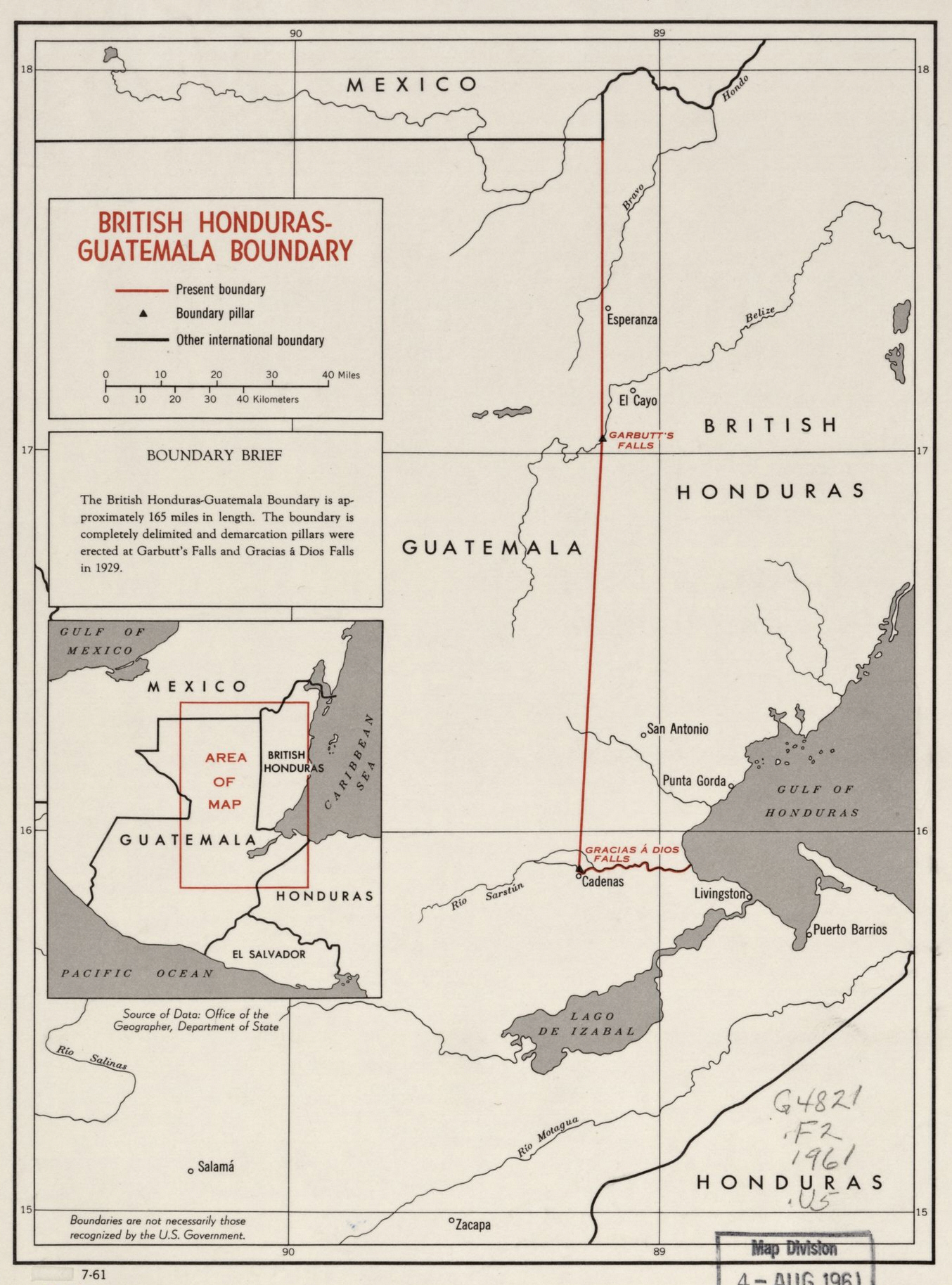
1961 CIA map of British Honduras-Guatemala border

In 1964 and 1965, the Guatemalan Armed Forces began engaging in counterinsurgency operations against the MR-13 in eastern Guatemala. In February and March 1964, the Guatemalan Air Force began a selective bombing campaign against MR-13 bases in Izabal, which was followed by a counterinsurgency sweep in the neighboring department of Zacapa under the code-name "Operation Falcon" in September and October of the following year.

It was at this phase in the conflict that the U.S. government sent Green Berets and CIA advisers to instruct the Guatemalan military in counterinsurgency (anti-guerrilla warfare). In addition, U.S. police and "Public Safety" advisers were sent to reorganize the Guatemalan police forces. In response to increased insurgent activity in the capital, a specialty squad of the National Police was organized in June 1965 called Comando Seis ('Commando Six') to deal with urban guerrilla assaults. 'Commando Six' received special training from the U.S. Public Safety Program and money and weapons from U.S. Public Safety Advisors.

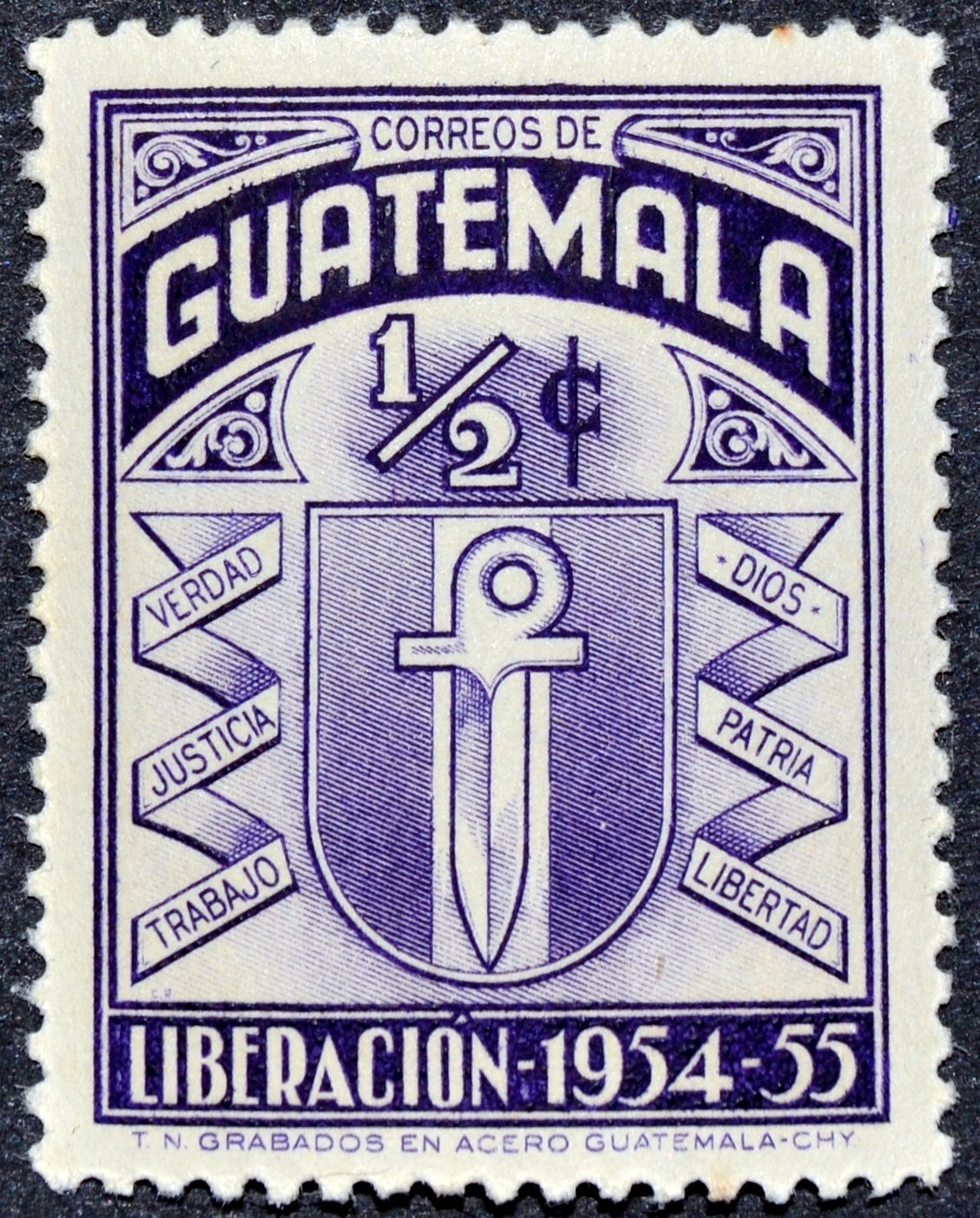
commemorating the 1954 invasion.

In November 1965, U.S. Public Safety Advisor John Longan arrived in Guatemala on temporary loan from his post in Venezuela to assist senior military and police officials in establishing an urban counterinsurgency program. With the assistance of Longan, the Guatemalan Military launched "Operation Limpieza" (Operation Cleanup) an urban counterinsurgency program under the command of Colonel Rafael Arriaga Bosque. This program coordinated the activities of all of the country's main security agencies (including the Army, the Judicial Police and the National Police) in both covert and overt anti-guerrilla operations. Under Arriaga's direction, the security forces began to abduct, torture and kill the PGT's key constituents.

With money and support from U.S. advisors, President Enrique Peralta Azurdia established a Presidential Intelligence Agency in the National Palace, under which a telecommunications database is known as the Regional Telecommunications Center or La Regional existed, linking the National Police, the Treasury Guard, the Judicial Police, the Presidential House and the Military Communications Center via a VHF-FM intracity frequency. La Regional also served as a depository for the names of suspected "subversives" and had its own intelligence and operational unit attached to it known as the Policía Regional. This network was built on the "Committees against Communism" created by the CIA after the coup in 1954.

=== Escalation of state terror ===
On 3 and 5 March 1966, the G-2 (military intelligence) and the Judicial Police raided three houses in Guatemala City, capturing twenty-eight trade unionists and members of the PGT. Those captured included most of the PGT's central committee and peasant federation leader Leonardo Castillo Flores. All subsequently "disappeared" while in the custody of the security force and became known in subsequent months by the Guatemalan press as "the 28". This incident was followed by a wave of unexplained "disappearances" and killings in Guatemala City and in the countryside which were reported by the Guatemala City press. When press censorship was lifted for a period, relatives of "the 28" and of others who had "disappeared" in the Zacapa-Izabal military zone went to the press or to the Association of University Students (AEU). Using its legal department, the AEU subsequently pressed for habeas corpus on behalf of the "disappeared" persons. The government denied any involvement in the killings and disappearances. On 16 July 1966, the AEU published a detailed report on abuses in the last months of the Peralta regime in which it named thirty-five individuals as involved in killings and disappearances, including military commissioners and members of the Ambulant Military Police (PMA) in coordination with the G-2. After the publication of this report, "death-squad" attacks on the AEU and on the University of San Carlos began to intensify. Many law students and members of the AEU were assassinated.

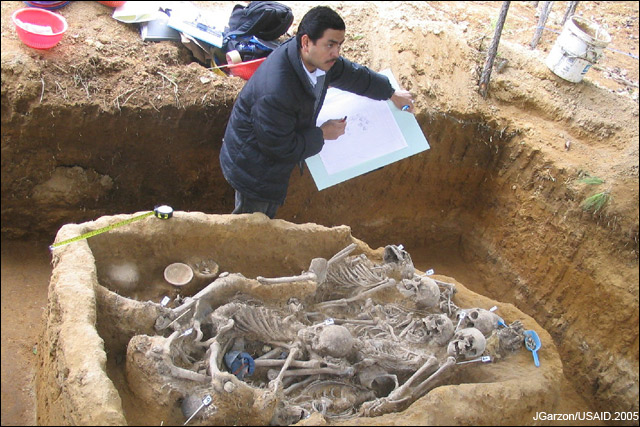
Exhumation of a mass grave in Compalapa, Chimaltenango (2005)

The use of such tactics increased dramatically after the inauguration of President Julio César Méndez Montenegro, who – in a bid to placate and secure the support of the military establishment – gave it carte blanche to engage in "any means necessary" to pacify the country. The military subsequently ran the counterinsurgency program autonomously from the Presidential House and appointed Vice-Defense Minister, Col. Manuel Francisco Sosa Avila as the main "counterinsurgency coordinator". In addition, the Army General Staff and the Ministry of Defense took control of the Presidential Intelligence Agency – which controlled the La Regional annex – and renamed it the Guatemalan National Security Service (Servicio de Seguridad Nacional de Guatemala – SSNG).

In the city and in the countryside, persons suspected of leftist sympathies began to disappear or turn up dead at an unprecedented rate. In the countryside most "disappearances" and killings were carried out by uniformed army patrols and by locally known PMA or military commissioners, while in the cities the abductions and "disappearances" were usually carried out by heavily armed men in plainclothes, operating out of the army and police installations. The army and police denied responsibility, pointing the finger at right-wing paramilitary death squads autonomous from the government.

One of the most notorious death squads operating during this period was the MANO, also known as the Mano Blanca ("White Hand"); initially formed by the MLN as a paramilitary front in June 1966 to prevent President Méndez Montenegro from taking office, the MANO was quickly taken over by the military and incorporated into the state's counter-terror apparatus. The MANO – while being the only death squad formed autonomously from the government – had a largely military membership, and received substantial funding from wealthy landowners. The MANO also received information from military intelligence through La Regional, with which it was linked to the Army General Staff and all of the main security forces.

The first leaflets by the MANO appeared on 3 June 1966 in Guatemala City, announcing the impending creation of the "White Hand" or "the hand that will eradicate National Renegades and traitors to the fatherland." In August 1966, MANO leaflets were distributed over Guatemala City by way of light aircraft openly landing in the Air Force section of La Aurora airbase. Their main message was that all patriotic citizen must fully support the army's counterinsurgency initiative and that the army was "the institution of the greatest importance at any latitude, representative of Authority, of Order, and of Respect" and that to "attack it, divide it, or to wish its destruction is indisputedly treason to the fatherland."

=== Counterinsurgency in Zacapa ===
With increased military aid from the United States, the 5,000-man Guatemalan Army mounted a larger pacification effort in the departments of Zacapa and Izabal in October 1966 dubbed "Operation Guatemala." Colonel Arana Osorio was appointed commander of the Zacapa-Izabal Military Zone and took charge of the counter-terror program with guidance and training from 1,000 U.S. Green Berets. Under Colonel Arana's jurisdiction, military strategists armed and fielded various paramilitary death squads to supplement regular army and police units in clandestine terror operations against the FAR's civilian support base. Personnel, weapons, funds and operational instructions were supplied to these organizations by the armed forces. The death squads operated with impunity – permitted by the government to kill any civilians deemed to be either insurgents or insurgent collaborators. The civilian membership of the army's paramilitary units consisted largely of right-wing fanatics with ties to the MLN, founded and led by Mario Sandoval Alarcón, a former participant in the 1954 coup. By 1967, the Guatemalan army claimed to have 1,800 civilian paramilitaries under its direct control.

Blacklists were compiled of suspected guerrilla's collaborators and those with communist leanings, as troops and paramilitaries moved through Zacapa systematically arresting suspected insurgents and collaborators; prisoners were either killed on the spot or "disappeared" after being taken to clandestine detention camps for interrogation. In villages which the Army suspected were pro-guerrilla, the Army rounded up all of the peasant leaders and publicly executed them, threatening to kill additional civilians if the villagers did not cooperate with the authorities. In a 1976 report, Amnesty International cited estimates that between 3,000 and 8,000 peasants were killed by the army and paramilitary organizations in Zacapa and Izabal between October 1966 and March 1968. Other estimates put the death toll at 15,000 in Zacapa during the Mendez period. As a result, Colonel Arana Osorio subsequently earned the nickname "The Butcher of Zacapa" for his brutality.

=== State of Siege ===
On 2 November 1966 a nationwide 'state of siege' was declared in Guatemala in which civil rights – including the right to habeas corpus – were suspended. The entire security apparatus – including local police and private security guards – was subsequently placed under then Minister of Defense, Col. Rafael Arriaga Bosque. Press censorship was imposed alongside these security measures, including measures designed to keep the Zacapa campaign entirely shrouded in secrecy. These controls ensured that the only reports made public on the counter-terror program in Zacapa were those handed out by the army's public relations office. Also on the day of the 'state of siege,' a directive was published banning publication of reports on arrests until authorization by military authorities.

At the time of the Zacapa campaign, the government launched a parallel counter-terror program in the cities. Part of this new initiative was the increased militarization of the police forces and the activation of several new counter-terror units of the army and the National Police for performing urban counter-terror functions, particularly extralegal activities against opponents of the state. The National Police were subsequently transformed into an adjunct of the military and became a frontline force in the government's urban pacification program against the left.

In January 1967, the Guatemalan Army formed the 'Special Commando Unit of the Guatemalan Army' – SCUGA – a thirty-five man commando unit composed of anti-communist army officers and right-wing civilians, which was placed under the command of Colonel Máximo Zepeda. The SCUGA – which the CIA referred to as a "government-sponsored terrorist organization...used primarily for assassinations and political abductions" – carried out abductions, bombings, street assassinations, torture, "disappearances" and summary executions of both real and suspected communists. The SCUGA also worked with the Mano Blanca for a period before inter-agency rivalry took over. In March 1967, after Vice-Defense Minister and counterinsurgency coordinator Col. Francisco Sosa Avila was named director-general of the National Police, a special counterinsurgency unit of the National Police known as the Fourth Corps was created to carry out extralegal operations alongside the SCUGA. The Fourth Corps was an illegal fifty-man assassination squad which operated in secrecy from other members of the National Police, taking orders from Col. Sosa and Col. Arriaga.

Operations carried out under by the SCUGA and the Fourth Corps were usually carried out under the guise of paramilitary fronts, such as RAYO, NOA, CADEG and others. By 1967, at least twenty such death squads operated in Guatemala City which posted blacklists of suspected "communists" who were then targeted for murder. These lists were often published with police mugshots and passport photographs which were only accessible to the Ministry of the Interior. In January 1968, a booklet containing 85 names was distributed throughout the country entitled People of Guatemala, Know the Traitors, the Guerrillas of the FAR. Many of those named in the booklet were killed or forced to flee. Death threats and warnings were sent to both individuals and organizations; for example, a CADEG leaflet addressed to the leadership of the labor federation FECETRAG read: "Your hour has come. Communists at the service of Fidel Castro, Russia, and Communist China. You have until the last day of March to leave the country." Victims of government repression in the capital included guerrilla sympathizers, labor union leaders, intellectuals, students, and other vaguely defined "enemies of the government." Some observers referred to the policy of the Guatemalan government as "White Terror" -a term previously used to describe similar periods of anti-communist mass killings in countries such as Taiwan and Spain.

By the end of 1967, the counterinsurgency program had resulted in the virtual defeat of the FAR insurgency in Zacapa and Izabal and the retreat of many of its members to Guatemala City. President Mendez Montenegro suggested in his annual message to congress in 1967 that the insurgents had been defeated. Despite the defeat of the insurgency, the government's killings continued. In December 1967, 26-year-old Rogelia Cruz Martinez, former "Miss Guatemala" of 1959, who was known for her left-wing sympathies, was picked up and found dead. Her body showed signs of torture, rape and mutilation. Amidst the outcry over the murder, the FAR opened fire on a carload of American military advisors on 16 January 1968. Colonel John D. Webber (chief of the U.S. military mission in Guatemala) and Naval Attache Lieutenant Commander Ernest A. Munro were killed instantly; two others were wounded. The FAR subsequently issued a statement claiming that the killings were a reprisal against the Americans for creating "genocidal forces" which had "resulted in the death of nearly 4,000 Guatemalans" during the previous two years.

=== The kidnapping of Archbishop Casariego ===
On 16 March 1968, kidnappers apprehended Roman Catholic Archbishop Mario Casariego y Acevedo within 100 yards of the National Palace in the presence of heavily armed troops and police. The kidnappers (possible members of the security forces on orders from the army high command) intended to stage a false flag incident by implicating guerrilla forces in the kidnapping; the Archbishop was well known for his extremely conservative views and it was considered that he might have organized a "self-kidnapping" to harm the reputation of the guerrillas. However, he refused to go along with the scheme and his kidnappers plan to "create a national crisis by appealing to the anti-communism of the Catholic population." The Archbishop was released unharmed after four days in captivity. In the aftermath of the incident, two civilians involved in the operation – Raul Estuardo Lorenzana and Ines Mufio Padilla – were arrested and taken away in a police patrol car. In transit, the car stopped and the police officers exited the vehicle as gunmen sprayed it with submachine gunfire. One press report said Lorenzana's body had 27 bullet wounds and Padilla's 22. The police escorts were unharmed in the assassination. Raul Lorenzana was a known "front man" for the MANO death squad and had operated out of the headquarters of the Guatemalan Army's Cuartel de Matamoros and a government safe house at La Aurora airbase. The army was not left unscathed by the scandal and its three primary leaders of the counterinsurgency program were replaced and sent abroad. Defense Minister Rafael Arriaga Bosque was sent to Miami, Florida to become Consul General; Vice-Defense Minister and Director-General of the National Police, Col. Francisco Sosa Avila was dispatched as a military attache to Spain and Col. Arana Osorio was sent as Ambassador to Nicaragua, which was under the rule of Anastasio Somoza Debayle at the time. Political murders by "death squads" declined in subsequent months and the "state of siege" was reduced to a "state of alarm" on 24 June 1968.

=== The assassinations of Ambassador John Gordon Mein and Count Karl Von Spreti ===
The lull in political violence in the aftermath of the "kidnapping" of Archbishop Casariego ended after several months. On 28 August 1968, U.S. Ambassador John Gordon Mein was assassinated by FAR rebels one block from the U.S. consulate on Avenida Reforma in Guatemala City. U.S. officials believed that FAR intended to kidnap him in order to negotiate an exchange, but instead, they shot him when he attempted to escape. Some sources suggested that the high command of the Guatemalan Army was involved in the assassination of Ambassador Mein. This was alleged years later to U.S. investigators by a reputed former bodyguard of Col. Arana Osorio named Jorge Zimeri Saffie, who had fled to the U.S. in 1976 and had been arrested on firearms charges in 1977. The Guatemalan police claimed to have "solved" the crime almost immediately, announcing that they had located a suspect on the same day. The suspect "Michele Firk, a French socialist who had rented the car used to kidnap Mein" shot herself as police came to interrogate her. In her notebook Michele had written:

It is hard to find the words to express the state of putrefaction that exists in Guatemala, and the permanent terror in which the inhabitants live. Everyday bodies are pulled out of the Motagua River, riddled with bullets and partially eaten by fish. Every day men are kidnapped right in the street by unidentified people in cars, armed to the teeth, with no intervention by the police patrols.

The assassination of Ambassador Mein led to public calls for tougher counterinsurgency measures by the military and an increase in U.S. security assistance. This was followed by a renewed wave of "death squad" killings of members of the opposition, under the guise of new Defense Minister Col. Rolando Chinchilla Aguilar and Army chief of staff Col. Doroteo Reyes, who were both subsequently promoted to the rank of "General" in September 1968.

On 31 March 1970 West German Ambassador Count Karl Von Spreti was kidnapped when his car was intercepted by armed men belonging to the FAR. The FAR subsequently put out a ransom note in which they demanded $700,000 ransom and the release of 17 political prisoners (which was eventually brought up to 25). The Mendez government refused to cooperate with the FAR, causing outrage among the diplomatic community and the German government. Ten days later on 9 April 1970, Von Sprite was found dead after an anonymous phone call was made disclosing the whereabouts of his remains.

=== Domination by military rulers ===
In July 1970, Colonel Carlos Arana Osorio assumed the presidency. Arana, backed by the army, represented an alliance of the MLN – the originators of the MANO death squad – and the Institutional Democratic Party (MLN-PID). Arana was the first of a string of military rulers allied with the Institutional Democratic Party who dominated Guatemalan politics in the 1970s and 1980s (his predecessor, Julio César Méndez, while dominated by the army, was a civilian). Colonel Arana, who had been in charge of the terror campaign in Zacapa, was an anti-communist hardliner who once stated, "If it is necessary to turn the country into a cemetery in order to pacify it, I will not hesitate to do so."

Despite minimal armed insurgent activity at the time, Arana announced another "state of siege" on 13 November 1970 and imposed a curfew from 9:00 PM to 5:00 AM, during which time all vehicle and pedestrian traffic — including ambulances, fire engines, nurses, and physicians—were forbidden throughout the national territory. The siege was accompanied by a series of house to house searches by the police, which reportedly led to 1,600 detentions in the capital in the first fifteen days of the "State of Siege." Arana also imposed dress codes, banning miniskirts for women and long hair for men. High government sources were cited at the time by foreign journalists as acknowledging 700 executions by security forces or paramilitary death squads in the first two months of the "State of Siege". This is corroborated by a January 1971 secret bulletin of the U.S. Defense Intelligence Agency detailing the elimination of hundreds of suspected "terrorists and bandits" in the Guatemalan countryside by the security forces.

While government repression continued in the countryside, the majority of victims of government repression under Arana were residents of the capital. "Special commandos" of the military and the Fourth Corps of the National Police acting "under government control but outside the judicial processes", abducted, tortured and killed thousands of leftists, students, labor union leaders and common criminals in Guatemala City. In November 1970, the 'Judicial Police' were formally disbanded and a new semi-autonomous intelligence agency of the National Police was activated known as the 'Detectives Corps' – with members operating in plainclothes – which eventually became notorious for repression. One method of torture commonly used by the National Police at the time consisted of placing a rubber "hood" filled with insecticide over the victim's head to the point of suffocation.

Some of the first victims of Arana's state of the siege were his critics in the press and in the university. In Guatemala City on 26 November 1970, security forces captured and disappeared journalists Enrique Salazar Solorzano and Luis Perez Diaz in an apparent reprisal for newspaper stories condemning the repression. On 27 November, National University law professor and government critic Julio Camey Herrera was found murdered. On the following day, radio station owner Humberto Gonzalez Juarez, his business associate Armando Bran Valle and a secretary disappeared, their bodies were subsequently found in a ravine. Later in 1975, a former member of the Detective Corps of the National Police – jailed for a non-political murder – took credit for the killing.

In October 1971, over 12,000 students at the University of San Carlos of Guatemala went on a general strike to protest the killing of students by the security forces; they called for an end to the "state of siege." On 27 November 1971, the Guatemalan military responded with an extensive raid on the main campus of the university, seeking cached weapons. It mobilized 800 army personnel, as well as tanks, helicopters and armored cars, for the raid. They conducted a room-to-room search of the entire campus but found no evidence or supplies.

A number of death squads – run by the police and intelligence services – emerged in the capital during this period. In one incident on 13 October 1972, ten people were knifed to death in the name of a death squad known as the "Avenging Vulture." Guatemalan government sources confirmed to the U.S. Department of State that the "Avenging Vulture" and other similar death squads operating during the time period were a "smokescreen" for extralegal tactics being employed by the National Police against non-political delinquents. Another infamous death squad active during this time was the 'Ojo por Ojo' (Eye for an Eye), described in a U.S. State Department intelligence cable as "a largely military membership with some civilian cooperation". The 'Ojo por Ojo' tortured, killed and mutilated scores of civilians linked to the PGT or suspected of collaborating with the FAR in the first half of the 1970s.

According to Amnesty International and domestic human rights organizations such as 'Committee of Relatives of Disappeared Persons', over 7,000 civilian opponents of the security forces were 'disappeared' or found dead in 1970 and 1971, followed by an additional 8,000 in 1972 and 1973. In the period between January and September 1973, the Guatemalan Human Rights Commission documented the deaths and forced disappearances of 1,314 individuals by death squads. The Guatemalan Human Rights Commission estimated 20,000 people killed or "disappeared" between 1970 and 1974.

Amnesty International mentioned Guatemala as one of several countries under a human rights state of emergency, while citing "the high incidence of disappearances of Guatemalan citizens" as a major and continuing problem in its 1972–1973 annual report. Overall, as many as 42,000 Guatemalan civilians were killed or "disappeared" between 1966 and 1973.

== Franja Transversal del Norte ==
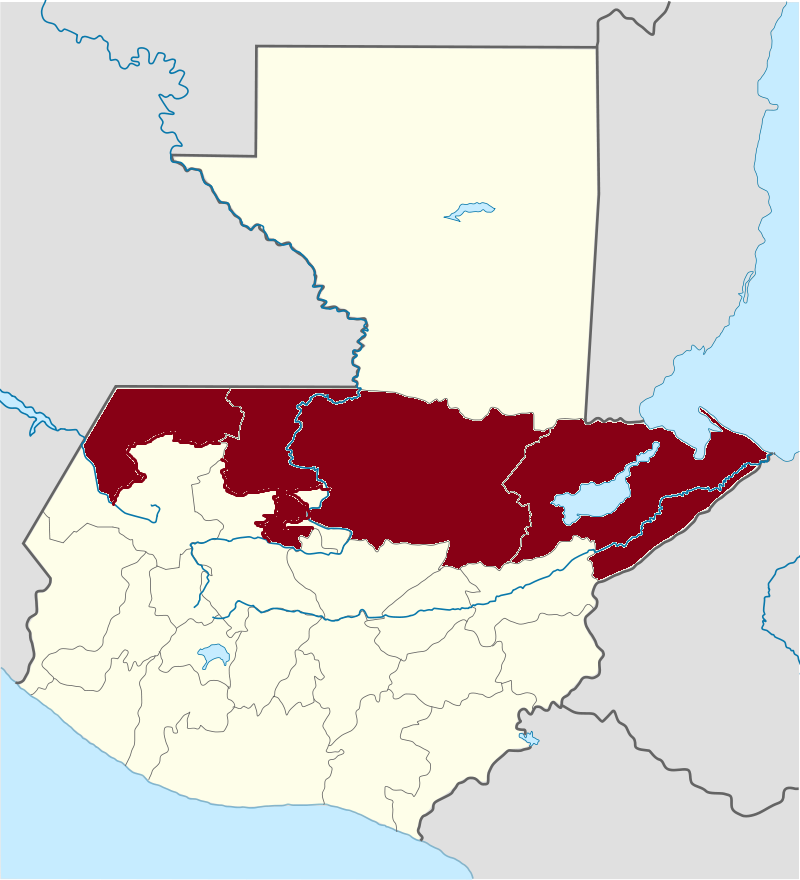
Location of the Franja Transversal del Norte (Northern Transversal Strip) in Guatemala.

The first settler project in the FTN was in Sebol-Chinajá in Alta Verapaz. Sebol, then regarded as a strategic point and route through Cancuén river, which communicated with Petén through the Usumacinta River on the border with Mexico and the only road that existed was a dirt one built by President Lázaro Chacón in 1928. In 1958, during the government of General Miguel Ydígoras Fuentes, the Inter-American Development Bank (IDB) financed infrastructure projects in Sebol. (Note: Sebol finally adopted the name "Fray Bartolomé de las Casas", municipality created in 1983 in Alta Verapaz.) In 1960, then Army captain Fernando Romeo Lucas García inherited Saquixquib and Punta de Boloncó farms in northeastern Sebol. In 1963 he bought the farm "San Fernando" El Palmar de Sejux and finally bought the "Sepur" farm near San Fernando. During those years, Lucas was in the Guatemalan legislature and lobbied in Congress to boost investment in that area of the country.

In those years, the importance of the region was in livestock, exploitation of precious export wood, and archaeological wealth. Timber contracts were granted to multinational companies such as Murphy Pacific Corporation from California, which invested US$30 million for the colonization of southern Petén and Alta Verapaz, and formed the North Impulsadora Company. Colonization of the area was made through a process by which inhospitable areas of the FTN were granted to native peasants.

In 1962, the DGAA became the National Institute of Agrarian Reform (INTA), by Decree 1551 which created the law of Agrarian Transformation. In 1964, INTA defined the geography of the FTN as the northern part of the departments of Huehuetenango, Quiché, Alta Verapaz and Izabal and that same year priests of the Maryknoll order and the Order of the Sacred Heart began the first process of colonization, along with INTA, carrying settlers from Huehuetenango to the Ixcán sector in Quiché.

It is of public interest and national emergency, the establishment of Agrarian Development Zones in the area included within the municipalities: San Ana Huista, San Antonio Huista, Nentón, Jacaltenango, San Mateo Ixtatán, and Santa Cruz Barillas in Huehuetenango; Chajul and San Miguel Uspantán in Quiché; Cobán, Chisec, San Pedro Carchá, Lanquín, Senahú, Cahabón and Chahal, in Alta Verapaz and the entire department of Izabal.

— Decreto 60–70, artítulo 1o.

The Northern Transversal Strip was officially created during the government of General Carlos Arana Osorio in 1970, by Legislative Decree 60–70, for agricultural development.

=== Guerrilla Army of the Poor ===
On 19 January 1972, members of a new Guatemalan guerrilla movement (made up of surviving former leaders of the FAR) entered Ixcán, from Mexico, and were accepted by many farmers; in 1973, after an exploratory foray into the municipal seat of Cotzal, the insurgent group decided to set up camp underground in the mountains of Xolchiché, municipality of Chajul.

In 1974 the insurgent guerrilla group held its first conference, where it defined its strategy of action for the coming months and called itself Guerrilla Army of the Poor (-Ejército Guerrillero de Los Pobres -EGP-). In 1975 the organization had spread around the area of the mountains of northern municipalities of Nebaj and Chajul. As part of its strategy, EGP decided to perpetrate notorious acts which also symbolized the establishment of a "social justice" against the inefficiency and ineffectiveness of the judicial and administrative State institutions. They also wanted that with these actions the indigenous rural population of the region identified with the insurgency, thus motivating them to join their ranks. As part of this plan it was agreed to do the so-called "executions"; in order to determine who would be subject to "execution", the EGP gathered complaints received from local communities. For example, they selected two victims: Guillermo Monzón, who was a military Commissioner in Ixcán and José Luis Arenas, the largest landowner in the area, and who had been reported to the EGP for allegedly having land conflicts with neighboring settlements and abusing their workers. (Note: José Luis Arenas, who at that time a journalist called "Ixcán Tiger" had been active in Guatemalan politics. He joined as Congress of Republic in the period of Jacobo Arbenz in the opposition; in 1952, he founded the Anti-communist Unification Party (AUP), which later became part of the liberationist movement; went into exile when the first armed clashes between the "Liberation Army" and the Guatemalan Army occurred, but returned with the victory of the National Liberation Movement and during the government of colonel Carlos Castillo Armas he held various public offices. During Carlos Arana Osorio presidency (1970–1974) was in charge of the Promotion and Development of Petén agency (FYDEP); later, he left politics for agriculture in his coffee and cardamom plantations in the Ixcán and the Ixil area, in Quiché.)

== Mass movement for social reforms: 1974–1976 ==
For several years after the "state of siege," the insurgency was largely inactive, having been defeated and demoralized on all fronts. Massive economic inequality persisted, compounded by external factors such the 1973 oil crisis, which led to rising food prices, fuel shortages, and decreased agricultural output due to the lack of imported goods and petrol-based fertilizers. A blatant electoral fraud during the 1974 presidential elections favored Arana's Defense Minister, General Kjell Eugenio Laugerud García, who was also a veteran of the 1966–68 Zacapa campaign. Laugerud, like his predecessor, represented the right-wing alliance between the MLN and the Institutional Democratic Party (MLN-PID), this time against a center-left alliance promoting the ticket of Christian Democrat General José Efraín Ríos Montt (later president from 1982 to 1983) and leftist economist Alberto Fuentes Mohr. Inflation, imbalance, public outrage at the electoral fraud, and discontent with human rights violations generated widespread protest and civil disobedience. A mass social movement emerged that persisted throughout much of the decade.

Coinciding with the election of Kjell Laugerud was the rise to prominence of labor organizations in rural Guatemala, such as the CUC. When the CUC (Committee for Peasant Unity) first began organizing in the countryside in the early 1970s more than 300,000 rural peasants left the Guatemalan altiplano every year to work on plantations on the Pacific coast to supplement their minuscule earnings. The CUC was the first Indian-led national labor organization and the first to unite Ladino workers and Indian farmers in a struggle for better working conditions. The growth of cooperatives could be attributed to the fact that the new military government – at least on the surface – appeared to support the establishment of cooperatives and unions to improve working conditions.

Unlike his predecessor, General Laugerud did not begin his term with the use of military repression to consolidate power and seemed to favor negotiation between unions and industries over than silencing the workers through violence. The public support given to cooperatives under General Laugerud prompted the U.S. Agency for International Development (AID) to grant Guatemala $4,500,000 to finance the purchase of fertilizers and other supplies, while the Inter-American Development Bank granted an additional $15,000,000 for "cooperative development" in early 1976.

On Saturday, 7 June 1975 landowner José Luis Arenas was assassinated on the premises of his farm "La Perla." In front of his office there were approximately two to three hundred peasant workers to receive payment. Hidden among the workers were four members of the EGP, who destroyed the communication radio of the farm and executed Arenas. Following the assassination, the guerrillas spoke in Ixil language to the farmers, informing them that they were members of the Guerrilla Army of the Poor and had killed the "Ixcán Tiger" due to his alleged multiple crimes against community members. The attackers then fled towards Chajul, while José Luis Arenas' son, who was in San Luis Ixcán at the time, took refuge in a nearby mountain and awaited the arrival of a plane to take him directly to Guatemala City to the presidential palace. There he immediately reported the matter to Minister of Defense, General Fernando Romeo Lucas García. Romeo Lucas replied, "You are mistaken, there are no guerrillas in the area".

Despite the Defense Minister's denial of the presence of guerrillas in Ixcán, the government responded to these new guerrilla actions by systematically eliminating many cooperative leaders in the Guatemalan highlands. While the new government appeared to support cooperative development on the surface, previous statements had been made by General Laugerud in which he had condemned cooperatives as a facade for Soviet Communism. Due to the fact that cooperatives had largely been drawn out into the open, it was relatively easy for the intelligence services to collate the names of cooperative members in order to designate targets for an extermination program, which seems to have begun shortly thereafter.

On 7 July 1975, one month to the date after the assassination of Arenas, a contingent of army paratroopers arrived in the marketplace of Ixcán Grande. There they seized 30 men who were members of the Xalbal cooperative and took them away in helicopters; all were subsequently "disappeared". The case of the thirty men seized on 7 July, as well as seven other cases of "disappearances" among the same cooperative were named in a sworn statement to General Kjell Laugerud in November 1975. The Ministry of the Interior responded by denying that the "disappeared" persons had been taken by the government. That same month, a disturbing mimeographed letter sent to Guatemala City cooperatives in the name of the MANO "death squad" was reported in the press:

We know of your PROCOMMUNIST attitude...We know by experience that all labor organizations and cooperatives always fall into the power of Communist Leaders infiltrated into them. We have the organization and the force to prevent this from happening again... There are THIRTY THOUSAND CLANDESTINE PEASANT GRAVES TO BEAR WITNESS....

A total of 60 cooperative leaders were murdered or "disappeared" in Ixcan between June and December 1975. An additional 163 cooperative and village leaders were assassinated by death squads between 1976 and 1978. Believing that the Catholic Church constituted a major part of the social base of the EGP, the regime also began singling out targets among the catechists. Between November 1976 and December 1977, death squads murdered 143 Catholic Action catechists of the 'Diocese of El Quiche.' Documented cases of killings and forced disappearances during this time represent a small fraction of the true number of killings by government forces, especially in the indigenous highlands, as many killings of persons went unreported.

On 4 February 1976, a devastating 7.5 M_{w} earthquake shook Guatemala. Over 23,000 Guatemalans perished in the disaster and close to a million were left without adequate housing. The earthquake had a political effect as well: the visible incapacity and corruption of the government to deal with the effects of the catastrophe led to a rise in independent organizing and left many survivors deeply critical of the government. The political system was ineffective to ensure the welfare of the populace. In the aftermath of the earthquake, more citizens wanted infrastructural reforms, and many saw it as the government's responsibility to invest in these improvements. In the poor barrios disproportionately affected by the quake, due to poor infrastructure, neighborhood groups helped to rescue victims or dig out the dead, distribute water, food and reconstruction materials, and prevent looting by criminals. The political pressures generated in the aftermath of the earthquake put greater pressure on the military government of Guatemala to induce reforms. The security forces subsequently took advantage of the disorder to engage in a wave of political assassinations in Guatemala City, of which 200 cases were documented by Amnesty International. A period of increased militarization began in the Indian highlands after the earthquake, accompanied by additional counterinsurgency operations.

At the same time, the Guatemalan government was becoming increasing isolated internationally. In 1977, the administration of US-president Jimmy Carter targeted Guatemala and several other Latin American regimes for a reduction in military assistance in pursuance with Section 502B of the Foreign Assistance Act, which stated that no assistance will be provided to a government "engages in a consistent pattern of gross violations of internationally recognized human rights."

== Transition between Laugerud and Lucas Garcia regimes ==
Due to his seniority in both the military and economic elites in Guatemala, as well as the fact that he spoke q'ekchi perfectly, one of the Guatemalan indigenous languages, Lucas García became the ideal candidate for the 1978 elections; and to further enhance his image, he was paired with the leftist doctor Francisco Villagrán Kramer as his running mate. Villagrán Kramer was a man of recognized democratic trajectory, having participated in the Revolution of 1944, and was linked to the interests of transnational corporations and elites, as he was one of the main advisers of agricultural, industrial and financial chambers of Guatemala. Despite the democratic facade, the electoral victory was not easy and the establishment had to impose Lucas García, causing further discredit the electoral system -which had already suffered a fraud when General Laugerud was imposed in the 1974 elections.

In 1976 student group called "FRENTE" emerged in the Universidad de San Carlos de Guatemala, which completely swept all student body positions that were up for election that year. FRENTE leaders were mostly members of the Patriotic Workers' Youth, the youth wing of the Guatemalan Labor Party -Partido Guatemalteco del Trabajo- (PGT), the Guatemalan communist party who had worked in the shadows since it was illegalized in 1954. Unlike other Marxist organizations in Guatemala at the time, PGT leaders trusted the mass movement to gain power through elections.

FRENTE used its power within the student associations to launch a political campaign for the 1978 university general elections, allied with leftist Faculty members grouped in "University Vanguard". The alliance was effective and Oliverio Castañeda de León was elected as President of the Student Body and Saúl Osorio Paz as President of the university; plus they had ties with the university workers union (STUSC) through their PGT connections. Osorio Paz gave space and support to the student movement and instead of having a conflictive relationship with students, different representations combined to build a higher education institution of higher social projection. In 1978 the University of San Carlos became one of the sectors with more political weight in Guatemala; that year the student movement, faculty and University Governing Board -Consejo Superior Universitario- united against the government and were in favor of opening spaces for the neediest sectors. In order to expand its university extension, the Student Body (AEU) rehabilitated the "Student House" in downtown Guatemala City; there, they welcomed and supported families of villagers and peasant already sensitized politically. They also organized groups of workers in the informal trade.

At the beginning of his tenure as president, Saúl Osorio founded the weekly Siete Días en la USAC (Seven Days in USAC), which besides reporting on the activities of the university, constantly denounced the violation of human rights, especially the repression against the popular movement. It also told what was happening with revolutionary movements in both Nicaragua and El Salvador. For a few months, the state university was a united and progressive institution, preparing to confront the State head on.

Now, FRENTE had to face the radical left, represented then by the Student Revolutionary Front "Robin García" (FERG), which emerged during the Labor Day march of 1 May 1978. FERG coordinated several student associations on different colleges within University of San Carlos and public secondary education institutions. This coordination between legal groups came from the Guerrilla Army of the Poor (EGP), a guerrilla group that had appeared in 1972 and had its headquarters in the oil rich region of northern Quiché department -i.e., the Ixil Triangle of Ixcán, Nebaj and Chajul in Franja Transversal del Norte. Although not strictly an armed group, FERG sought confrontation with government forces all the time, giving prominence to measures that could actually degenerate into mass violence and paramilitary activity. Its members were not interested in working within an institutional framework and never asked permission for their public demonstrations or actions.

== Lucas García presidency (1978–1982) ==
Romeo Lucas García escalated state terror under guise of repressing leftist rebels but in practice was used to murder civilians. This caused an uprising in the city.

=== Civil war in the city ===
In response to the increasing number of disappearances and killings, the insurgency began targeting members of the security forces, beginning with the assassination of Juan Antonio "El Chino" Lima López – a notorious torturer and second in command of the Commando Six unit of the National Police – on 15 January 1980. On the day of his death, Lima López was sporting a U.S. Army signet ring. The National Police said López, 32, had driven away from his house in downtown Guatemala City when gunmen in another vehicle pulled up next to him and opened fire with automatic rifles, killing him instantly. None of the insurgent groups operating in the Guatemala immediately took responsibility.

On 31 January 1980, a group of displaced K'iche' and Ixil peasant farmers occupied the Spanish Embassy in Guatemala City to protest the kidnapping and murder of peasants in Uspantán by elements of the Guatemalan Army. Guatemalan government officials, including the National Police Detective Corps Chief, branded them as guerilleros, collaborators, and subversives, warning people on radio and television not to be fooled by the campesinos' appearance. A special meeting was held in the National Palace by President Romeo Lucas, Col. Germán Chupina Barahona, and Minister of the Interior Donaldo Álvarez Ruiz. Despite pleas by Spanish Ambassador Máximo Cajal y López to negotiate, a decision was made among Gen. Lucas García's cabinet to forcibly expel the group occupying the embassy. Shortly before noon, about 300 heavily armed state agents cordoned off the area to vehicular traffic and cut the electricity, water and telephone lines. Under the orders from Lt. Colonel Pedro García Arredondo, the Commando Six unit of the National Police proceeded to occupy the first and third floors of the building over the shouts of Ambassador Cajal that they were violating international law in doing so. The peasants barricaded themselves, along with the captive embassy staff and the visiting Guatemalan officials, in the ambassador's office on the second floor. A fire ensued as "Commando Six" prevented those inside of the embassy from exiting the building. In all, 36 people were killed in the fire. The funeral of the victims (including the father of Rigoberta Menchú, Vicente Menchú) attracted hundreds of thousands of mourners, and a new guerrilla group was formed commemorating the date, the Frente patriotico 31 de enero (Patriotic Front of 31 January or FP-31). The incident has been called "the defining event" of the Guatemalan Civil War. The Guatemalan government issued a statement claiming that its forces had entered the embassy at the request of the Spanish Ambassador, and that the occupiers of the embassy, whom they referred to as "terrorists," had "sacrificed the hostages and immolated themselves afterward." Ambassador Cajal denied the claims of the Guatemalan government and Spain immediately terminated diplomatic relations with Guatemala, calling the action a violation of "the most elementary norms of international law." Relations between Spain and Guatemala were not normalized until 22 September 1984.

The climate of fear maintained by the Lucas government in Guatemala City persisted through 1980 and 1981. Political killings and disappearances of residents were common-place and ordinary residents lived in terror of the death squads. A coordinated campaign against trade unionists was undertaken by the National Police under Col. Germán Chupina, who had close ties with the American Chamber of Commerce and with numerous business leaders. The manager of the Coca-Cola franchise in Guatemala City, John C. Trotter from Texas, was apparently a personal friend of Col. Chupina. Trotter would allegedly contact Col. Chupina via telephone regarding the activities of the union at the plant, and many unionists subsequently disappeared or were found dead later. The insurgents had attempted unsuccessfully to assassinate Col. Chupina, as well as Interior Minister Donaldo Álvarez, in February and March 1980.

In one incident on 21 June 1980, 60 non-uniformed agents – likely from the Detectives Corps – seized and detained 27 members of the National Workers Union (CNT) during an attack on its headquarters, in which uniformed police blocked off the streets surrounding the building. The trade unionists were taken away in unmarked Toyota jeeps or forced into their own cars and taken away. All 27 members of the CNT seized on that day disappeared while in the custody of the police. Among those abducted were members of the union representing the workers of the Coca-Cola plant under John Trotter.

On 7 July 1980, Col. Miguel Ángel Natareno Salazar, head of the infamous Fourth Corps of the National Police, was assassinated along with his driver and two bodyguards while on his way to work. This was followed by the assassinations of three police agents, two special agents of the Army G-2 and a security guard of the Ministry of the Interior in the following week.

On 24 August 1980, plainclothes National Police and Army soldiers under the direction of Alfonso Ortiz, the Deputy Chief of the Detectives Corps, abducted 17 union leaders and a Catholic administrator from a seminar at the "Emaus Medio Monte" estate belonging to the diocese of Escuintla, on the southern coast of Guatemala. The detainees were taken to the garages of National Police in Zone 6 of Guatemala City where they were tortured under the direction of the former head of Commando Six, Col. Pedro García Arredondo, who had been promoted to Chief of the Detectives Corps. All 17 unionists subsequently disappeared after being tortured under Col. Arredondo.

Beheaded corpses hanging from their legs in between what is left from blown up cars, shapeless bodies among glass shards and tree branches all over the place is what a terrorist attack caused yesterday at 9:35 am. El Gráfico reporters were able to get to exact place where the bomb went off, only seconds after the horrific explosion, and found a truly infernal scene in the corner of the 6th avenue and 6th street -where the Presidential Office is located- which had turned into a huge oven -but the solid building where the president worked was safe-. The reporters witnessed the dramatic rescue of the wounded, some of them critical, like the man that completely lost a leg and had only stripes of skin instead.

— El Gráfico, 6 September 1980

On 5 September 1980 the Ejército Guerrillero de los Pobres (EGP) carried out a terrorist attack right in front of the Guatemalan National Palace, then the headquarters of the Guatemalan government. The intention was to prevent a huge demonstration that the government had prepared for Sunday, 7 September 1980. In the attack, six adults and a little boy died after two bombs inside a vehicle went off. There was an undetermined number of wounded and heavy material losses, not only from art pieces from the National Palace, but from all the surrounding buildings, particularly in the Lucky Building, which is right across the Presidential Office. (Note: Among the deceased was Domingo Sánchez, Secretary of Agriculture driver; Joaquín Díaz y Díaz, a car washer; and Amilcar de Paz, a security guard.)

As killings by government security forces and death squads increased, so did terrorist attacks against private financial, commercial and agricultural targets by the insurgents, who saw those institutions as "reactionaries" and "millionaire exploiters" that were collaborating with the genocidal government. The following is a non-exhaustive list of the terrorist attacks that occurred in Guatemala city and are presented in the UN Commission report:

Date	Perpetrator	Target	Result
15 September 1981	Rebel Army Forces	Corporación Financiera Nacional (CORFINA)	Car bomb damaged the building and neighbor Guatemalan and international financial institutions; there were more than Q300k in losses.
19 October 1981	EGP Urban guerrilla	Industrial Bank Financial Center	Building sabotage.
21 December 1981	EGP "Otto René Castillo" commando	Bombs against newly built structures: Chamber of Industry, Torre Panamericana (Bank of Coffee headquarters) and Industrial Bank Financial Center	Car bombs completely destroyed the buildings windows.
28 December 1981	EGP "Otto René Castillo" commando	Industrial Bank Financial Center	Car bomb against the building which virtually destroyed one of the bank towers. (Note: In a sign of defiance, the bank did not repair the windows immediately and continued operating as normally as it could.)

Despite advances by the insurgency, the insurgency made a series of fatal strategic errors. The successes made by the revolutionary forces in Nicaragua against the Somoza regime combined with the insurgency's own successes against the Lucas government led rebel leaders to falsely conclude that a military equilibrium was being reached in Guatemala, thus the insurgency underestimated the military strength of the government. The insurgency subsequently found itself overwhelmed on both urban and countryside fronts.

On the urban front, the armed forces began to utilize more sophisticated technology to combat the insurgency. With help of advisors from Israel, a computer system was installed in the annex of the EMP behind the presidential palace in 1980. This computer used a data analysis system used to monitor electrical and water usage as a means of pinpointing the coordinates of potential guerrilla safe-houses. In the July 1981, tanks and shock troops were mobilized for a massive series of raids to shut down the guerrilla bases operating in the city. Thirty ORPA safe-houses were raided in Guatemala City in the summer of 1981 according to G-2 sources. Large caches of small arms were located in these raids, including 17 American-made M-16s which had previously been issued to American units in Vietnam in the late 1960s and early 1970s

=== Insurgent mobilization in the countryside ===
The daily number of killings by official and unofficial security forces increased from an average of 20 to 30 in 1979 to a conservative estimate of 30 to 40 daily in 1980. Human rights sources estimated 5,000 Guatemalans were killed by the government for "political reasons" in 1980 alone, making Guatemala the worst human rights violator in the hemisphere after El Salvador. In a report titled Guatemala: A Government Program of Political Murder, Amnesty International stated, "Between January and November of 1980, some 3,000 people described by government representatives as "subversives" and "criminals" were either shot on the spot in political assassinations or seized and murdered later; at least 364 others seized in this period have not yet been accounted for."

With the mass movement being ravaged by covertly sanctioned terror in the cities and brutal army repression in the countryside, its constituents saw no other option than to take up arms against the regime, which led to the growth of the insurgent movement. At the same time the EGP was expanding its presence in the Highlands, a new insurgent movement called the ORPA (Revolutionary Organization of Armed People) made itself known. Composed of local youths and university intellectuals, the ORPA developed out of a movement called the Regional de Occidente, which split from the FAR-PGT in 1971. The ORPA's leader, Rodrigo Asturias (a former activist with the PGT and first-born son of Nobel Prize-winning author Miguel Ángel Asturias), formed the organization after returning from exile in Mexico. The ORPA established an operational base in the mountains and forests above the coffee plantations of southwestern Guatemala and in the Atitlán where it enjoyed considerable popular support. On 18 September 1979, the ORPA made its existence publicly known when it occupied the Mujulia coffee farm in the coffee-growing region of the Quetzaltenango Department to hold a political education meeting with the workers.

In 1979 the EGP controlled a large amount of territory in the Ixil Triangle and held many demonstrations in Nebaj, Chajul and Cotzal. That year, the owners of "La Perla" established links with the army and for the first time a military detachment was installed within the property; in this same building the first civil patrol of the area was established. The Army high command, meanwhile, was very pleased with the initial results of the operation and was convinced it had succeeded in destroying most of the social basis of EGP, which had to be expelled from the "Ixil Triangle". Army repression in the region became more intense and less selective than it had been under Laugerud García; the officers who executed the plan were instructed to destroy all towns suspected of cooperating with EGP and eliminate all sources of resistance. Army units operating in the "Ixil Triangle" belonged to the Mariscal Zavala Brigade, stationed in Guatemala City. Moreover, although the EGP did not intervene directly when the army attacked the civilian population – allegedly due to a lack of supplies and ammunition – it did support some survival strategies. It streamlined, for example, "survival plans" designed to give evacuation instructions in assumption that military incursions took place. Most of the population began to participate in the schemes finding that they represented their only alternative to military repression.

In December 1979, the Guatemalan Army staged a false flag incident in Chajul – ostensibly to justify repressive measures against the city. On 6 December 1979, the Guatemalan Army abducted nine peasants from Uspantán and transported them to Chajul in a helicopter. Two of the peasants captured by the army managed to escape, while those remaining were dressed in olive drab by the army. After being put in uniform, the peasants were equipped with shotguns and instructed by soldiers to march down a road outside of Chajul. The soldiers then opened fire on the peasants, killing all seven. The army announced that the campesinos were guerrillas, who had attempted to assault the detachment at Chajul. The bodies were later burned and buried. Within three weeks the army presence in Chajul grew and repression escalated.

The repression and excessive force used by the government against the opposition was such that it became source of contention within Lucas García's administration itself. This contention within the government caused Lucas García's Vice President Francisco Villagrán Kramer to resign from his position on 1 September 1980. In his resignation, Villagran cited his disapproval of the government's human rights record as one of the primary reasons for his resignation. He then went into voluntary exile in the United States, taking a position in the Legal Department of the Inter-American Development Bank.

In 1980, armed insurgents assassinated prominent Ixil landowner Enrique Brol, and president of the CACIF (Coordinating Committee of Agricultural, Commercial, Industrial, and Financial Associations) Alberto Habie. In October 1980, a tripartite alliance was formalized between the EGP, the FAR and the ORPA as a precondition for Cuban-backing.

In early 1981, the insurgency mounted the largest offensive in the country's history. This was followed by an additional offensive towards the end of the year, in which many civilians were forced to participate by the insurgents. Villagers worked with the insurgency to sabotage roads and army establishments, and destroy anything of strategic value to the armed forces. By 1981, an estimated 250,000 to 500,000 members of Guatemala's indigenous community actively supported the insurgency. Guatemalan Army Intelligence (G-2) estimated a minimum 360,000 indigenous supporters of the EGP alone.

=== List of massacres perpetrated by the EGP in FTN ===
According to a report by the rightist magazine "Crónica", there were 1258 guerrilla actions against civilians and infrastructure in Guatemala, including more than two hundred murders, sixty eight kidnappings, eleven bombs against embassies and three hundred twenty-nine attacks against civilians. Almost all guerrilla massacres occurred in 1982 when further militarization reigned and there was widespread presence of PAC in communities; many of them were victims of non-cooperation with the guerrillas and in some cases they came after a previous attack by the PAC. In the massacres perpetrated by the guerrillas, there is no use of informants, systematic concentration of the population, or separation of specific groups; also, there are no recounts of rape or repetitive slaughter. While some villages were razed, there was less of a tendency towards mass flight of the victims, even though it still occurred in some cases. The use of lists was also more frequent.

In a publication of the Army of Guatemala, sixty massacres perpetrated by the EGP were reported, arguing that they were mostly ignored by REHMI and the Historical Clarification Commission reports. It is also reported that in mid-1982, 32 members of "Star Guerrilla Front " were shot for not raising the EGP flag.

Quiché was the site of many massacres during the war

Massacres perpetrated by the EGP
#	Location	Department	Date	Description
1	Calapté, Uspantán	Quiché	17 February 1982	There were 42 fatal victims, who were murdered with machetes.
2	Salacuín	Alta Verapaz	May 1982	EGP entered the community and murdered 20 peasants.
3	El Conguito (settlement), Las Pacayas (village), San Cristóbal Verapaz	Alta Verapaz	1981	
4	Sanimtakaj (village), San Cristóbal Verapaz	Alta Verapaz	1980	
5	San Miguel Sechochoch (farm), Chisec	Alta Verapaz	March 1982	
6	Chacalté, Chajul	Quiché	June 1982	Attack against a "reactionary gang" (Note: Comisión para el Esclarecimiento Histórico: Caso No. 110 (1999). "Memoria del silencio" (PDF). Archived (PDF) from the original on 23 March 2017. "EGP classified the PAC according to the collaboration level they gave to the Army. The guerrilla differentiated patrols formed by people eager to help the Army -and called them "reactionary gangs"- from those "forced civilian patrols" that were forcibly participating.") from the PAC in Chacalté, that had just formed in March and was loyal to the Army after becoming disillusioned with guerrilla promises. Resulted in 55 dead civilians.
7	San Miguel Acatán (town), San Miguel Acatán	Huehuetenango	Unknown	
8	Santa Cruz del Quiche (city), Santa Cruz del Quiché	Quiché	July 1982	
9	Chuacaman (settlement), El Carmen Chitatul (village), Santa Cruz del Quiché	Quiché	December 1982	
10	La Estancia(village), Santa Cruz del Quiché	Quiché	August 1981	
11	Xesic (village), Santa Cruz del Quiché	Quiché	1981	
12	Patzité (town)	Quiché	September 1981	
13	Lancetillo (village), Uspantán	Quiché	September 1982	
14	La Taña (village), Uspantán	Quiché	March 1982	
15	Tzununul (village), Sacapulas	Quiché	February 1982	
16	Salinas Magdalena (village), Sacapulas	Quiché	August 1982	
17	Rosario Monte María (village), Chicamán	Quiché	October 1982	

=== 'Operation Ceniza' 1981 ===
Relying on continued material support from the United States and US-allied third parties, the armed forces under Army Chief of Staff, Benedicto Lucas García (the president's brother, known as "General Benny") initiated a strategy of "scorched earth" to "separate and isolate the insurgents from the civilian population", under the code-name "Operación Ceniza" ("Operation Ash"). In a strategy developed jointly by Benedicto Lucas García and Lieutenant Col. George Maynes (U.S. Defense Attache and Chief of the U.S. MilGroup in Guatemala), some 15,000 troops were deployed on a gradual sweep through the highlands.

By way of a policy of forced recruitment, Gen. Benedicto Lucas began organizing a "task-force" model for fighting the insurgency, by which strategic mobile forces of 3,000 to 5,000 troops were drawn from larger military brigades for search and destroy missions in the highlands. These operations led to massive civilian casualties, numbering in the tens of thousands. The use of genocidal scorched-earth tactics radicalized the population, creating antipathy towards the government and causing the ranks of the insurgents to swell to unprecedented levels.

Meanwhile, relations between the Guatemalan military establishment and the Lucas García regime worsened. Professionals within the Guatemalan military considered the Lucas approach counterproductive, on grounds that the Lucas government's strategy of military action and systematic terror overlooked the social and ideological causes of the insurgency while radicalizing the civilian population. Additionally, Lucas went against the military's interests by endorsing his defense minister, Ángel Aníbal Guevara, as a candidate in the March 1982 presidential elections.

== 1982 coup d'état and Ríos Montt regime ==
On 23 March 1982, junior officers under the command of General Efraín Ríos Montt staged a coup d'état and deposed General Romeo Lucas Garcia. The coup was not supported by any entities within the Lucas government aside from the junior officers involved in engineering the coup. At the time of the coup, the majority of Lucas Garcia's senior officers were reportedly unaware of any previous coup plotting on the part of the junior officers or any other entity. General Lucas was reportedly prepared to resist the coup, and could have easily opposed the coup with his own contingent of troops stationed at the presidential palace, but was coerced into surrendering by being shown his mother and sister held with rifles to their heads. After the overthrow of Lucas Garcia, the home of Lucas's Interior Minister Donaldo Álvarez Ruiz was raided, uncovering a printing press, clandestine jail cells and property taken from police torture victims, including fifty stolen vehicles and scores of gold graduation rings.

Within two months after seizing power, Ríos Montt worked to strengthen his personal power and began eliminating those officers which he believed to be involved in counter-coup plotting. One particularly cohesive group of officers opposed to Ríos was the Guatemalan Military Academy promotion class number 73. To intimidate these officers and stifle plans for a counter-coup, Ríos Montt ordered the arrest and investigation of three of its most prominent members: Captains Mario López Serrano, Roberto Enrique Letona Hora and Otto Pérez Molina. He threatened to expose evidence of their corruption if they continued to oppose him. On 9 July 1982, Ríos Montt forced two members of the junta to resign, leaving him in complete control of the government, as both the de facto head of the armed forces and Minister of Defense.

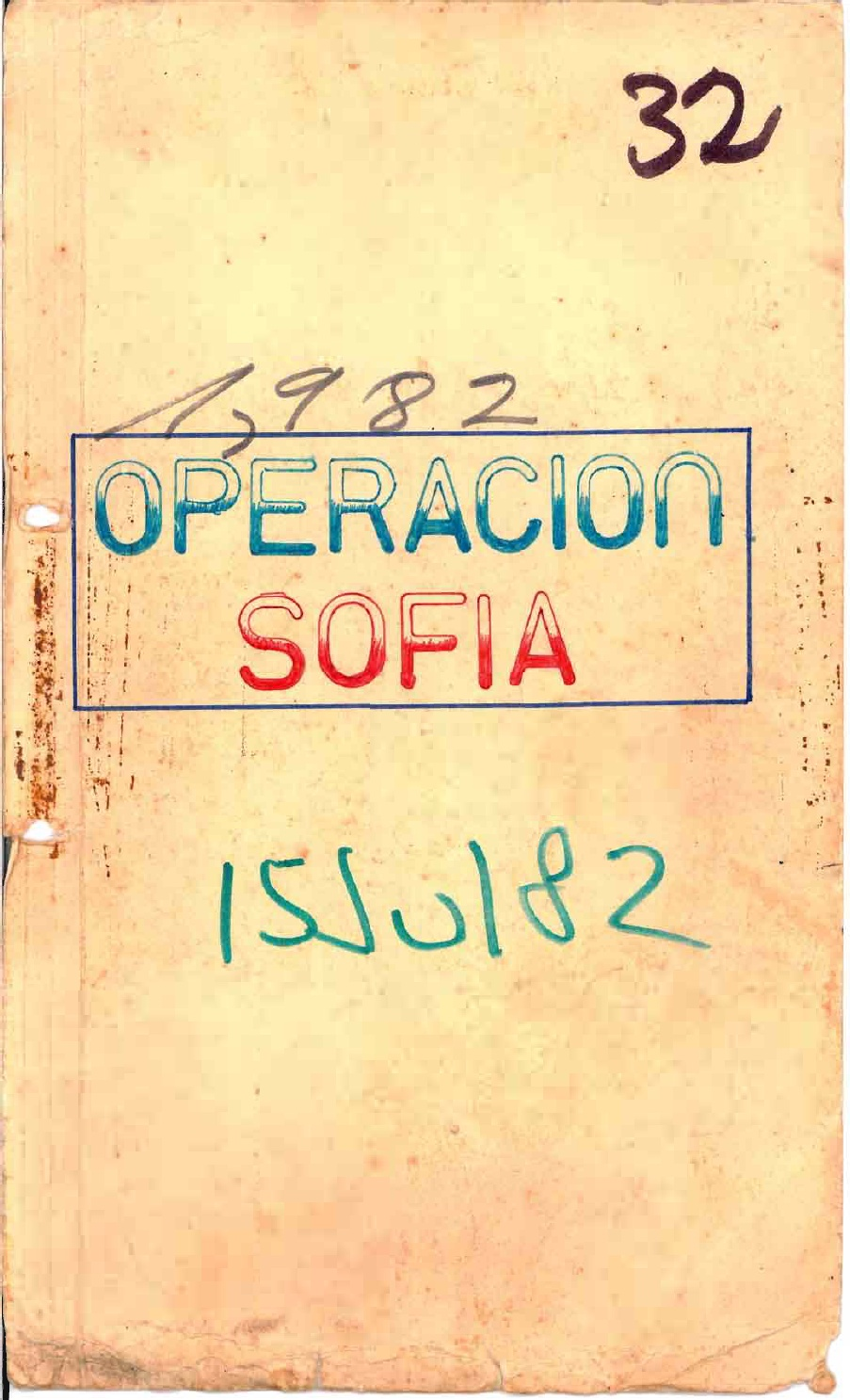
Operation Sofia: document issued by the Guatemalan army in 1982.

=== 'Victoria 82' and 'Operation Sofia' ===
The architects of the counterinsurgency program under Rios Montt were aware of the social problems generated by the counterinsurgency under Lucas Garcia; the most counterproductive was the widespread antipathy generated amongst towards the State through indiscriminate mass murder. A compromise was reached between the army's drive to eradicate the insurgency and the desire to "win the hearts and minds" of the civilian population and new counterinsurgency program known as "Victoria 82" was implemented on 6 June 1982. The authors of the plan emphasized that "The population's mentality is the principal objective". The program combined the brutal scorched-earth tactics developed and executed under Benedicto Lucas Garcia with social welfare programs and government assistance, both to incentivize civilian cooperation with the army and mitigate the negative effects of army massacres. Ríos Montt also expanded on the "civic action" strategy, which began under Benedicto Lucas. The civilian paramilitary bands fielded by Lucas were renamed "civilian self-defense patrols" (PACs), and the army began conscripting large portions of the rural civilian population into the militias. At the start of the Rios Montt period there were approximately 25,000 civilians in the PACs. In the subsequent eighteen months, this number grew to 700,000, due to a policy of forced conscription. Dissenters to the establishment of civil patrols in their villages were often marked for death or other violent reprisal by the army.

Despite the implementation of social welfare and civil action programs, "Victoria 82" still sought first and foremost to destroy the guerrilla forces and their base through operations of annihilation and the scorched earth tactics. As stated in the plan's "Purpose" (II/A/1-3), the army's job was to:

- Defend the population.
- Recover members of the Irregular Local Forces (Fuerzas Irregulares Locales-FIL) when possible while eliminating subversives who refuse to lay down their weapons.
- Annihilate the Clandestine Local Committees (Comités Clandestinos Locales-CCL) and the Permanent Military Units (Unidades Militares Permanentes-UMP) of the enemy.

Although the plan distinguished between the army's objectives regarding the FIL and the CCL, both groups were local unarmed campesinos living and working in the targeted areas of operation. The FIL were civilians whose routine labors continued – tending their crops in the field or their domestic responsibilities – while they contributed to self-defense actions to hinder the Army's activities. The CCL were local leaders, often communitarian authorities, who served as political representatives for the guerrilla. The death of these leaders was a priority for the Army because it signified the end of the political connection between the guerrilla units and their bases of social support.

=== Urban Reforms ===
While wholesale killings of indigenous peasants escalated to unprecedented levels in the countryside, "death squad" killings in the cities decreased. A U.S. defense attaché report informed Washington in April 1982 that "The army intended to act with two sets of rules, one to protect and respect the rights of average citizens who lived in secure areas (mostly in the cities) and had nothing to do with subversion. The second set of rules would be applied to the areas where subversion was prevalent. In these areas ('war zones') the rules of unconventional warfare would apply. Guerrillas would be destroyed by fire and their infrastructure eradicated by social welfare programs."

Pursuant with the army's new "set of rules", Rios Montt began to make changes in the intelligence apparatus and disbanded – or renamed – some of the security structures which had become infamous for repression in the capital under previous regimes. In March 1982, shortly after the coup, Rios Montt disbanded the 'Detectives Corps' of the National Police and replaced it with the 'Department of Technical Investigations' (DIT). Additionally, Col. Germán Chupina Barahona – who was responsible for much of the repression in the capital under Lucas – was forced to resign and Col. Hernán Ponce Nitsch, a former instructor at the U.S. Army School of the Americas, was appointed as director-general of the National Police. Col. Hector Ismael Montalván Batres was retained for a period as the chief of the EMP after the coup, due to his experience.

Since the insurgency operated in remote rural areas, the application of "unconventional warfare" became less prevalent in the capital. According to some observers, the decline in extralegal tactics by the National Police and intelligence services and the passing of press censorship laws offered the regime some degree of plausible deniability and fostered the misconception on the outside and among city dwellers that political repression was on a downward trend in Guatemala.

However, in February 1983, a then-confidential CIA cable noted a rise in "suspect right-wing violence" in the capital, with an increasing number of kidnappings (particularly of educators and students) and a concomitant increase in the number of corpses recovered from ditches and gullies, previously a characteristic of state-terror under the Lucas Garcia regime. The cable traced the wave of death squad repression to an October 1982 meeting by General Ríos Montt with the "Archivos" intelligence unit in which he gave agents full authorization to "apprehend, hold, interrogate and dispose of suspected guerrillas as they saw fit." This marked the beginning of a gradual return to the conditions which prevailed in Guatemala City under Rios Montt's predecessors.

== Mejía Víctores regime and democratic transition: 1983–1986 ==
Ríos Montt was deposed on 8 August 1983 by his own Minister of Defense, General Óscar Humberto Mejía Víctores. Mejía became de facto president and justified the coup, saying that "religious fanatics" were abusing their positions in the government and also because of "official corruption." Ríos Montt remained in politics, founding the Guatemalan Republican Front party in 1989. Elected to Congress, he was elected President of Congress in 1995 and 2000.

By the time Mejía Víctores assumed power, the counterinsurgency under Lucas Garcia and Ríos Montt had largely succeeded in its objective of detaching the insurgency from its civilian support base. Additionally, Guatemalan military intelligence (G-2) had succeeded in infiltrating most of the political institutions. It eradicated opponents in the government through terror and selective assassinations. The counterinsurgency program had militarized Guatemalan society, creating a fearful atmosphere of terror that suppressed most public agitation and insurgency. The military had consolidated its power in virtually all sectors of society.

In 1983, indigenous activist Rigoberta Menchú published a memoir of her life during that period, I, Rigoberta Menchú, An Indian Woman in Guatemala, which gained worldwide attention. She is the daughter of one of the peasant leaders that died in the Spanish Embassy massacre on 31 January 1980. She was later awarded the 1992 Nobel Peace Prize -on the year of the Fifth Centennial celebration of America Discovery- for her work in favor of broader social justice. Her memoir drew international attention to Guatemala and the nature of its institutional terrorism.

Due to international pressure, as well as pressure from other Latin American nations, General Mejía Victores allowed a gradual return to democracy in Guatemala. On 1 July 1984 an election was held for representatives to a Constituent Assembly to draft a democratic constitution. On 30 May 1985, the Constituent Assembly finished drafting a new constitution, which took effect immediately. General elections were scheduled, and civilian candidate Vinicio Cerezo was elected as president. The gradual revival of "democracy" did not end the "disappearances" and death squad killings, as extrajudicial state violence had become an integral part of the political culture.

=== The Mutual Support Group (GAM) ===
On 18 February 1984, student leader Edgar Fernando Garcia "disappeared" after being seized and dragged into a van on the outskirts of a market near his home in Guatemala City. Fernando Garcia was a trade unionist and member of the outlawed PGT who was studying engineering at the University of San Carlos. The kidnappers were uniformed policemen with the BROE and the Fourth Corps of the National Police who were conducting stop-and-search patrols in the area. Those identified in his kidnapping were policemen Ramírez Ríos, Lancerio Gómez, Hugo Rolando Gómez Osorio and Alfonso Guillermo de León Marroquín.

In the wake of García's kidnapping, his wife, Nineth Montenegro – now a member of Congress – launched the Mutual Support Group (Grupo de Apoyo Mutuo—GAM), a new human rights organization that pressed the government for information about missing relatives. Co-founded with other families of the disappeared, GAM took shape in June 1984, holding demonstrations, meeting with government officials and leading a domestic and international advocacy campaign over the years to find the truth behind the thousands of Guatemala's disappeared. The organization was quickly joined by hundreds of additional family members of victims of government-sponsored violence, including Mayan Indians affected by the Army's genocidal counterinsurgency sweeps in the late-1970s and early-1980s.

In November 1984, the GAM boldly organized a "symbolic journey" to the constituent assembly where they met with the assembly president to demand information on the whereabouts of their "disappeared" relatives. After several days, they were received by General Mejia personally. There they repeated their demands for the whereabouts of their missing. A second meeting on 30 November 1984 led to the formation of a government commission to investigate the reports of the GAM's charges. The following month, the GAM met with the commission. The subsequent inaction of the commission in the following months led to protest.

==== Repression against the GAM ====
The military government of General Mejia Victores evinced no real desire to make concessions with the GAM and treated the organization as a front for leftist subversion. This was especially true when the GAM's actions began to attract international attention to the human rights situation in the Republic. On 1 March 1985 the office of the Guatemalan Attorney General was occupied by 100 members of the GAM in protest over the lack of action by the government investigative commission. In the subsequent period the government began to issue warnings to the GAM regarding illegal public protests, starting with a warning from the Interior Minister Gustavo Adolfo Lopez Sandoval to the GAM to cease and desist any protests which blocked public traffic. Gen. Mejia subsequently stated in interviews that he believed the group was being manipulated by leftist forces.

On Easter "Holy Week" in March 1985, the government's liquidation units began targeting the GAM's leadership. On 30 March 1985, senior GAM member Héctor Gómez Calito was abducted. U.S. Embassy sources reported that Calito had been under surveillance by the Department of Technical Investigations (DIT) for some time. His body later appeared bearing signs of torture. Following his murder, GAM co-founder and widow of missing student leader Carlos Ernesto Cuevas Molina, Rosario Godoy de Cuevas, who had delivered the eulogy at Gómez Calito's funeral, was found dead at the bottom of a ditch three kilometres (2 mi) outside Guatemala City, along with her 2-year-old son and 21-year-old brother. All of the three victims bodies bore signs of extreme torture prior to death. Human rights monitors who had seen the bodies reported that Godoy's 2-year-old son's fingernails had been ripped out. While the government claimed their deaths was an accident, Embassy sources discounted the official version of the events, and claimed that Godoy was targeted and her death was a premeditated homicide.

== Transition to elections ==
In 1985 the United States encouraged civilian rule and elections in Guatemala. When these emerged, Washington proclaimed the birth of "democracy" in one of its client states. The elections themselves were internationally acclaimed procedurally fair but were also considered deficient in terms of instituting substantive democratic reforms:

The elections in Guatemala in 1985 and 1990 as well as those in El Salvador in 1982, 1984, 1988, 1989, and 1991 were held against a background of state-sponsored terror that had taken tens of thousands of lives and had disarticulated most mass-based civic and political organizations. Candidates perforce came mainly from center to far-right parties, and independent or critical media outlets were nonexistent. Repression confined most citizen participation in formal national politics to voting. Only a tiny minority of center and right-wing party activists engaged in campaigns, and repression kept turnout low.

Historian Susanne Jonas writes that "for the most part from 1986 through 1995, civilian presidents allowed the army to rule from behind the scenes." After an initial decline, death squad violence and other abuses by the army had actually increased significantly in the late 1980s.

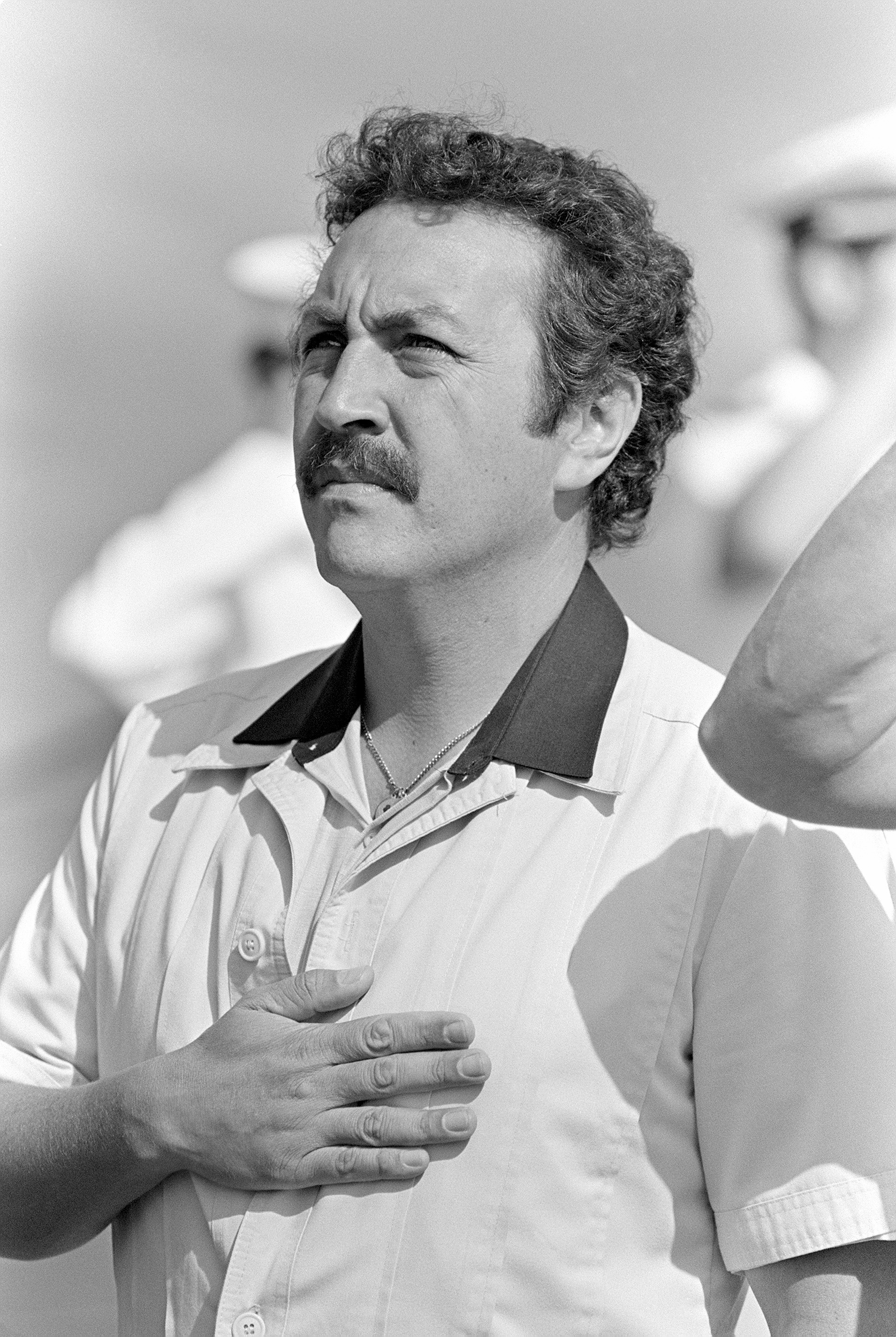
Vinicio Cerezo, President of Guatemala (1986-1991), was the promoter of the peace agreements in Central America; during his government the Esquipulas Agreement was signed.

=== Cerezo Administration ===
Vinicio Cerezo, a civilian politician and the presidential candidate of the Guatemalan Christian Democracy, won the first election held under the new constitution with almost 70 percent of the vote, and took office on 14 January 1986.

Upon its inauguration in January 1986, President Cerezo's civilian government announced that its top priorities would be to end the political violence and establish the rule of law. Reforms included new laws of habeas corpus and amparo (court-ordered protection), the creation of a legislative human rights committee, and the establishment in 1987 of the Office of Human Rights Ombudsman. The Supreme Court of Guatemala also embarked on a series of reforms to fight corruption and improve legal system efficiency.

With Cerezo's election, the military moved away from governing and returned to the more traditional role of providing internal security, specifically by fighting armed insurgents. The first two years of Cerezo's administration were characterized by a stable economy and a marked decrease in political violence. Dissatisfied military personnel made two coup attempts in May 1988 and May 1989, but military leadership supported the constitutional order. The government was heavily criticized for its unwillingness to investigate or prosecute cases of human rights violations.

The final two years of Cerezo's government also were marked by a failing economy, strikes, protest marches, and allegations of widespread corruption. The government's inability to deal with many of the nation's problems – such as infant mortality, illiteracy, deficient health and social services, and rising levels of violence – contributed to popular discontent.

Presidential and congressional elections were held on 11 November 1990. After the second-round ballot, Jorge Antonio Serrano Elías was inaugurated on 14 January 1991, thus completing the first transition from one democratically elected civilian government to another. Because his Movement of Solidarity Action (MAS) Party gained only 18 of 116 seats in Congress, Serrano entered into a tenuous alliance with the Christian Democrats and the National Union of the center (UCN).

The Serrano administration's record was mixed. It had some success in consolidating civilian control over the army, replacing a number of senior officers and persuading the military to participate in peace talks with the URNG. He took the politically unpopular step of recognizing the sovereignty of Belize, which until then had been officially, though fruitlessly, claimed by Guatemala. The Serrano government reversed the economic slide it inherited, reducing inflation and boosting real growth.

=== Serrano government dissolution and recovery ===
On 25 May 1993, Serrano illegally dissolved Congress and the Supreme Court and tried to restrict civil freedoms, allegedly to fight corruption. The autogolpe (or autocoup) failed due to unified, strong protests by most elements of Guatemalan society, international pressure, and the army's enforcement of the decisions of the Court of Constitutionality, which ruled against the attempted takeover. Serrano fled the country. An Intelligence Oversight Board report (secret at the time) states that the CIA helped in stopping this autocoup.

Pursuant to the 1985 constitution, the Guatemalan Congress on 5 June 1993 elected de León, the Human Rights Ombudsman, to complete Serrano's presidential term. He was not a member of any political party; lacking a political base but with strong popular support, he launched an ambitious anti-corruption campaign to "purify" Congress and the Supreme Court, demanding the resignations of all members of the two bodies. Shortly after he took office, his cousin, leader of the liberal party and two-time presidential candidate, was assassinated.

Despite considerable congressional resistance, presidential and popular pressure led to a November 1993 agreement brokered by the Catholic Church between the administration and Congress. This package of constitutional reforms was approved by popular referendum on 30 January 1995. In August 1994, a new Congress was elected to complete the unexpired term. Controlled by the anti-corruption parties: the populist Guatemalan Republican Front (FRG) headed by Ríos Montt, and the center-right National Advancement Party (PAN), the new Congress began to move away from the corruption that characterized its predecessors.

=== Renewed peace process (1994 to 1996) ===
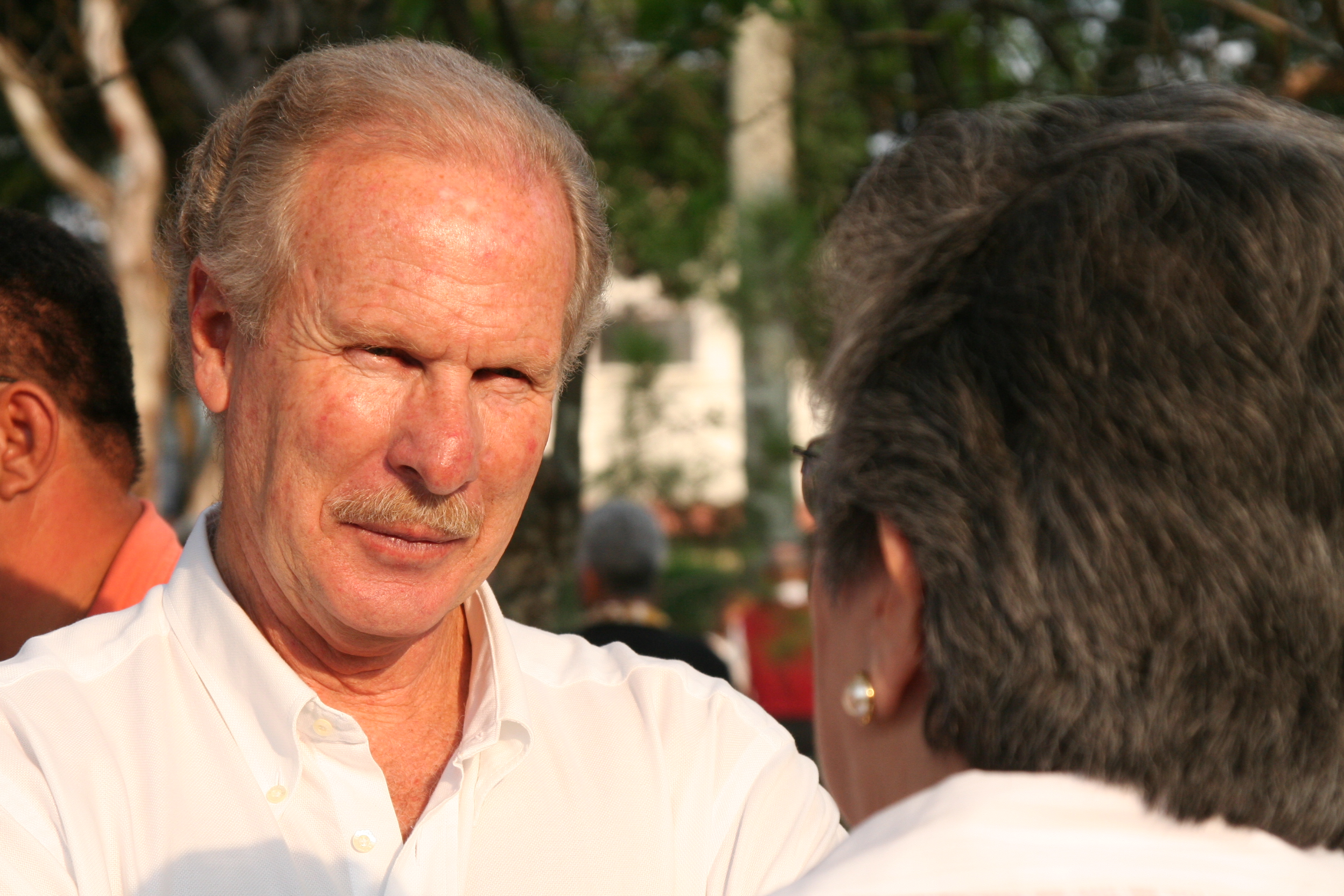
Álvaro Arzú, President of Guatemala (1996-2000), during his government the Peace Accords were finalized.

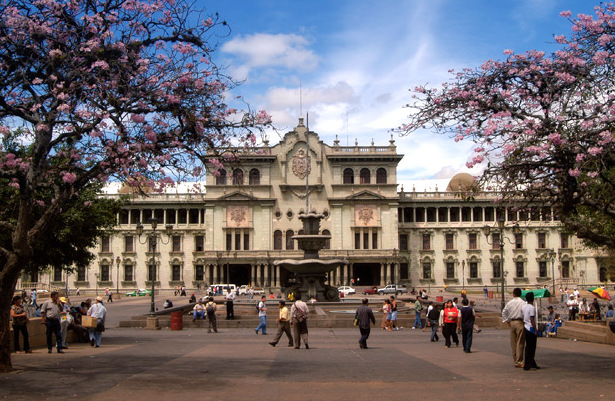
The Firm and Lasting Peace Agreement was signed at the National Palace of Culture on 29 December 1996..

Under de León, the peace process, now brokered by the United Nations, took on new life. The government and the URNG signed agreements on human rights (March 1994), resettlement of displaced persons (June 1994), historical clarification (June 1994), and indigenous rights (March 1995). They also made significant progress on a socio-economic and agrarian agreement.

National elections for president, Congress, and municipal offices were held in November 1995. With almost 20 parties competing in the first round, the presidential election came down to a 7 January 1996 run-off in which PAN candidate Álvaro Arzú Irigoyen defeated Alfonso Portillo Cabrera of the FRG by just over 2 percent of the vote. Arzú won because of his strength in Guatemala City, where he had previously served as mayor, and in the surrounding urban area. Portillo won all of the rural departments except Petén.

Under the Arzú administration, peace negotiations were concluded, and the government and the guerrilla umbrella organization URNG, which became a legal party, signed peace accords ending the 36-year internal conflict on 29 December 1996. The General Secretary of the URNG, Comandante Rolando Morán, and President Álvaro Arzú jointly received the UNESCO Peace Prize for their efforts to end the civil war and attaining the peace agreement. The United Nations Security Council adopted Resolution 1094 on 20 January 1997 deploying military observers to Guatemala to monitor the implementation of the peace agreements.

=== Casualties ===
By the end of the war, it is estimated that 140,000–200,000 people had been killed or had disappeared. (Note: The official 200,000 figure is not universally accepted; historian Carlos Sabina has argued for a much lower total of 37,000 civil war deaths, while a 2008 study in The BMJ gave an estimate of 20,000.) The overwhelming majority of those killed in human rights abuses were victims of official-sanctioned terror by government forces. The internal conflict is described in the report of the Archbishop's Office for Human Rights (ODHAG). ODHAG attributed almost 90.0 percent of the atrocities and over 400 massacres to the Guatemalan army (and paramilitary), and less than 5 percent of the atrocities to the guerrillas (including 16 massacres).

In a report in 1999, the UN-sponsored Historical Clarification Commission (CEH) stated that the state was responsible for 93 percent of the human rights violations committed during the war, the guerrillas for 3 percent. They peaked in 1982. 83 percent of the victims were Maya. Both sides used terror as a deliberate policy.

== Foreign support and involvement ==
=== United States involvement ===
Declassified CIA documents report that the U.S. Government organized, funded, and equipped the 1954 coup d'état, deposing the elected Guatemalan presidential government of Jacobo Árbenz Guzmán. Analysts Kate Doyle and Peter Kornbluh report that "after a small insurgency developed, in the wake of the coup, Guatemala's military leaders developed and refined, with U.S. assistance, a massive counter-insurgency campaign that left tens of thousands of massacred, maimed or missing [people]." Historian Stephen G. Rabe, reports that "in destroying the popularly elected government of Jacobo Arbenz Guzman (1950–1954), the United States initiated a nearly four-decade-long cycle of terror and repression." The coup d'état installed lead usurper Colonel Castillo Armas as head of government, and then he and "the United States began to militarize Guatemala almost immediately, financing and reorganizing the police and military."

==== US changes approach ====
The report by the Historical Clarification Commission (CEH) shows that the United States institutionalized its "National Security Doctrine" in nearly every country in Latin America. In Guatemala, this strategy was first implemented "as anti-reformist, then anti-democratic policies, culminating in criminal counterinsurgency." In 1962, the Kennedy administration shifted the mission of the armies in Latin America, including Guatemala, from "hemispheric defense" to "internal security". Charles Meachling Jr., who led U.S. counterinsurgency and internal defense planning from 1961 to 1966, explains the results of this new initiative as a shift from toleration of "the rapacity and cruelty of the Latin American military", to "direct complicity" in their crimes, to U.S. support for "the methods of Heinrich Himmler's extermination squads."

==== US training ====
Also in 1962, Guatemalan specialist Susanne Jonas has alleged that U.S. Special Forces set up a secret military training base. After a successful (U.S. backed) coup against president Miguel Ydígoras Fuentes in 1963, U.S. advisors began to work with Colonel Carlos Manuel Arana Osorio to defeat the guerrillas, borrowing "extensively from current counterinsurgency strategies and technology being employed in Vietnam." In subsequent years, Arana earned the nickname "Butcher of Zacapa". Amnesty International cited estimates that 3,000 to 8,000 peasants were killed by the army and paramilitary organizations in Zacapa and Izabal under Colonel Arana between October 1966 and March 1968. Other estimates are that 15,000 peasants were killed to eliminate 300 suspected rebels. After July 1966, when President Julio César Méndez Montenegro signed a pact permitting the army to pursue a more aggressive counterinsurgency program, there was an influx of American military and security advisors in Guatemala. Up to 1,000 U.S. Green Berets were estimated to be operating in Zacapa during the 1966–68 period, providing training and support for Guatemalan counterinsurgency operations. Jonas claims that the ratio of military advisers to local military officials in Guatemala was the highest of any Latin American country in the late 1960s and 70s, and moreover that "there is substantial evidence of the direct role of U.S. military advisers in the formation of death squads: U.S. Embassy personnel were allegedly involved in writing an August 1966 memorandum outlining the creation of paramilitary groups, and the U.S. military attaché during this period publicly claimed credit for instigating their formation as part of "counterterror" operations."

A retrospective analysis of U.S. government Biographic Register and Foreign Service Lists revealed that many of the same U.S. personnel operating in Guatemala during the 1960s and 70s also served in South Vietnam, particularly in Civil Operations and Revolutionary Development Support (CORDS).

==== Carter administration ====
In 1977, the Carter administration published a report citing the Guatemalan government as a "gross and consistent human rights violator" while noting that the situation was improving under the administration of president Kjell Eugenio Laugerud García. Angered by this report, the Laugerud government renounced all U.S. military assistance on 11 March 1977. Congress then reduced military aid to Guatemala for that year and prohibited military aid after 1978. Despite the prohibition, covert and overt U.S. support for the Guatemalan army continued as the administration continued to send equipment to Guatemala through the CIA or reclassified military items as non-military. In fiscal years 1978, 1979 and 1980 (the three years for which the Carter administration can be held responsible), the U.S. delivered approximately $8.5 million in direct military assistance to Guatemala, mostly Foreign Military Sales credits, as well as export licensing for commercial arms sales worth $1.8 million, a rate which differs very little from that of the Nixon-Ford Administrations. According to Elias Barahona, former Press Secretary for the Ministry of Home Affairs in Guatemala from 1976 to 1980, the United States also worked closely with the government of Gen. Romeo Lucas Garcia on the development of anti-guerrilla strategies through the "Programme for the Elimination of Communism". This was also confirmed by several other senior civil servants who worked under Lucas Garcia.

Additionally, the reaction of U.S. policymakers in multilateral lending institutions was at best ambiguous during the Carter administration and economic and financial aid continued to reach Guatemala. The U.S. only voted against 2 of 7 multilateral development bank loans for Guatemala between October 1979 and May 1980. In August 1980, it was reported that the U.S. had reversed its position entirely on multilateral development assistance to Guatemala. At that time, the U.S. refused to veto a $51 million loan from the IDB that was earmarked for government use in the turbulent Quiché area of northern Guatemala.

==== Reagan increases military assistance and cooperation ====
After the election of Ronald Reagan, the U.S. undertook more active measures to ensure close relations with the Guatemalan government. In April 1981, President Reagan's national security team agreed to supply military aid to the Guatemalan regime in order to exterminate leftist guerrillas and their "civilian support mechanisms," according to a document from the National Archives.

The U.S. provided military logistical support to the Guatemalan Army, which was reclassified as non-military "regional stability controls" to circumvent the Congressional Embargo. Such aid included a $3.2 million shipment of 150 jeeps and trucks and shipments of three Bell-212 and six Bell-412 helicopters – worth $10.5 million – which were reportedly indispensable to the Guatemalan Army's capacity to transport its troops into the highlands for counterinsurgency sweeps. Lieutenant Col. George Maynes – former U.S. Defense Attache and Chief of the U.S. MilGroup in Guatemala – also worked with Guatemalan Army Chief-of-Staff Benedicto Lucas Garcia in the planning and development of the counterinsurgency program which was implemented by the Lucas Garcia regime in the highlands in late-1981 and early 1982. Maynes had close relations with Gen. Benedicto Lucas, functioning as an advisor in counterinsurgency matters. In an interview with investigative journalist Allen Nairn, Lt. Col. Maynes stated that Benedicto Lucas consulted with him on a regular basis. USAID assisted the army's "model village" or resettlement camp programs there as well.

When Gen. Efrain Rios Montt seized power in 1982, the administration saw an opportunity to justify additional aid for Guatemala, including a $4 million shipment of helicopter spare parts. In October 1982, it was discovered that the U.S. Army Special Forces were instructing Guatemalan Army cadets in a wide range of counterinsurgency tactics at the Escuela Politecnica, the Guatemalan Army's main officer training school. Captain Jesse Garcia, a 32-year-old Green Beret interviewed by the New York Times during a training exercise in October 1982, described his work in Guatemala as "not much different" than that of U.S. advisors in El Salvador. The U.S. Special Forces had been operating in Guatemala since at least 1980 under the guise of the Personnel Exchange Program, and were officially classified as "English Instructors". The curriculum offered to Guatemalan cadets by the U.S. Special Forces during this period included training in surveillance, small arms, artillery, demolitions, ambushes, "helicopter assault tactics" and how to destroy towns. Another U.S. Green Beret interviewed by the New York Times – Major Larry Salmon – who had operated in Guatemala from 1980 to 1982, described how he had helped the Guatemalans plan their tactical training and had given course instructions to the Guatemalan Army Parachute Brigade. By 1983, it was also confirmed that Guatemalan military officers were once again being trained at the U.S. School of the Americas in Panama.

In early 1982, with authorization from the State Department and The Pentagon, ten American-made M41 Walker Bulldog light tanks were illegally delivered to Guatemala by ASCO – a Belgian company – at a cost of US$34 million. The 10 tanks were part of a U.S. government authorized shipment of 22 tanks from Belgium to the Dominican Republic. Only twelve of the tanks were unloaded and the remainder were shipped to the Guatemalan military in Puerto Barrios on the Caribbean coast.

==== Reagan administration dismisses reports of human rights abuses ====
Human Rights Watch in 1984 criticized U.S. President Ronald Reagan for his December 1982 visit to Ríos Montt in Honduras, where Reagan dismissed reports of human rights abuses by prominent human rights organizations while insisting that Ríos Montt was receiving a "bum rap". Human Rights Watch reported that soon after, the Reagan administration announced that it was dropping a five-year prohibition on arms sales and moreover had "approved a sale of $6.36 million worth of military spare parts," to Rios Montt and his forces. Human Rights Watch described the degree of U.S. responsibility thus:

In light of its long record of apologies for the government of Guatemala, and its failure to repudiate publicly those apologies even at a moment of disenchantment, we believe that the Reagan Administration shares in the responsibility for the gross abuses of human rights practiced by the government of Guatemala.

In January 1983, shortly after President Reagan's "bum rap" comment, Assistant Secretary of State for Human Rights Elliott Abrams went on television to defend the announced resumption of military aid: The army massacres and the ensuing refugee flows should be blamed "on the guerrillas who are fighting the government", he said. Massacres and refugees are "the price of stability." As opposition to U.S. policy grew, the London Economist, three months later observed, "What liberal Americans can reasonably expect is that a condition of military help to Guatemala should be an easing of the political persecution of the center – which played into the hands of the extreme left in the first place."

==== Support for Army Intelligence ====
The CEH's coordinator, Christian Tomuschat, stated that until the mid-1980s the United States government and U.S.-based multinationals exerted strong pressures "to maintain the country's archaic and unjust socioeconomic structures." In addition, he said, U.S. intelligence agencies, including the CIA, provided direct and indirect support to "some illegal state operations". In the 1980s and 1990s, the CIA employed Guatemalan intelligence officials as informants and supplied them with intelligence for their war efforts against guerrillas, farmers, peasants, and other opponents.

Among them, Colonel Julio Roberto Alpirez, base commander of the Military Intelligence Section (G-2). Alpirez discussed in an interview how the CIA helped advise and to run G-2. He claimed that U.S. agents trained G-2 men. Alpirez described attending CIA sessions at G-2 bases on "contra-subversion" tactics and "how to manage factors of power" to "fortify democracy." He said the CIA officials were on call to respond to G-2 questions, and that the G-2 often consulted the agency on how to deal with "political problems."

The agency also helped to provide "technical assistance" including communications equipment, computers and special firearms, as well as collaborative use of CIA-owned helicopters that were flown out of a piper hangar at La Aurora civilian airport and from a separate U.S. Air facility. The CIA also supplied the Guatemalan army and G-2 with "civil material assistance," which included medical supplies, Vietnam-era metal jeep parts, compasses, and walkie-talkies. When asked to summarize the CIA's relations with the Army Intelligence Directorate (D-2), one D-2 commander stated, "It's quite simple and I won't deny it: between the 1960s and 1990s, we had a structure from the CIA. The money, the resources, the training, and the relations were all from and through the CIA. This was the case because our intelligence, in the end, has had to serve the interests of the U.S."

An Intelligence Oversight Board report from 1996 writes that military aid was stopped during the Carter administration but later resumed under the Reagan Administration. "After a civilian government under President Cerezo was elected in 1985, overt non-lethal U.S. military aid to Guatemala resumed. In December 1990, however, largely as a result of the killing of U.S. citizen Michael DeVine by members of the Guatemalan army, the Bush administration suspended almost all overt military aid." "The funds the CIA provided to the Guatemalan liaison services were vital to the D-2 and Archivos." The CIA "continued this aid after the termination of overt military assistance in 1990." "Overall CIA funding levels to the Guatemalan services dropped consistently from about $3.5 million in FY 1989 to about 1 million in 1995." The report writes that "the CIA's liaison relationship with the Guatemalan services also benefited U.S. interests by enlisting the assistance of Guatemala's primary intelligence and security service – the army's directorate of intelligence (D-2) – in areas such as reversing the 'auto-coup of 1993'" "In the face of strong protests by Guatemalan citizens and the international community (including the United States) and – most importantly – in the face of the Guatemalan army's refusal to support him, President Serrano's Fujimori-style 'auto-coup' failed."

=== U.S. role in torture ===
It is unknown to what extent American military and intelligence personnel participated directly in torture and human rights abuses in Guatemala. Few citizens who were taken and tortured by the military and intelligence services survived and most were "disappeared". However, a handful of those who did survive torture in Guatemala over the years have recounted that American agents were present during torture sessions or interrogated them after they had already been tortured.

One man known as "David" was abducted by plainclothes soldiers in Guatemala City in 1969. He was stripped, beaten, burned with cigarettes and hooded with a bag full of insecticide before being fondled and threatened with rape. He was then subjected to repeated electric shocks on the sensitive parts of his body under the supervision of a "gringo" (a man speaking in an American accent) and told repeatedly to confess to being a guerrilla. After days of torture, his blindfold was removed and he was confronted by two Americans claiming to be from the Red Cross who told him that if he confessed to being a guerrilla, they would protect him from further torture. When "David" did not confess, they left and he never saw them again.

In another testimony, a fourteen-year-old boy known as "Miguel" was abducted in Guatemala City with two of his friends in 1982. Members of his family and several other friends were also seized by security forces. Over the course of two days, "Miguel" and his friends where beaten, denied food and suffocated with hoods. They also witnessed a dying man lying on the floor, bleeding through bandaged eyes. They were then taken one-by-one to the headquarters of the feared DIT (Department of Technical Investigations) where they were interviewed by an American. The American was described as a short-haired caucasian man in his forties, with a military build who was flanked with two Guatemalan guards. It was noted that the "gringo" seemed to be an experienced interrogator, who knew many details about him and his family. One of his surviving friends (also interrogated by the "gringo") noted how he bragged about his experiences in Vietnam and Africa. At one point he threatened to "burn Miguel's ass" with hot coals if he didn't cooperate. Two of his friends who were captured later "disappeared".

Another man "Juan" was a URNG guerrilla who was captured by the army in 1988 and turned over to the G-2 for interrogation. He was beaten with a bat, shocked on the testicles and underarms with electrodes and suffocated with a rubber hood full of insecticide (a very common torture technique in Guatemala). The army also seized his children from their church and threatened to drag them to death behind a car if he did not give better information. During one session, he was ushered into a room with two men, one of whom was notably taller than the other man and spoke in a heavy North American accent. The American promised Juan better treatment under the condition that he answer his questions, most of which pertained to the URNG's ties with Cuba and whether or not they had received training or medical treatment from the Cubans.

Perhaps the best known and most highly publicized case is that of Sister Dianna Ortiz, an American Roman Catholic nun who later founded a human rights advocacy group, the Torture Abolition and Survivors Support Coalition International (TASSC). In 1989, while working as a missionary in Guatemala, Ortiz was kidnapped, tortured, and gang raped by state security agents, receiving 111 second-degree cigarette burns. She identified the leader of the unit as a North American with the U.S. embassy and said that several members of the George H. W. Bush administration "slandered" her by denying her story. On a trip to Guatemala in 1999 after the publication of the Truth Commission report, U.S. President Bill Clinton issued an apology declaring that "support for military forces or intelligence units which engaged in violent and widespread repression of the kind described in the report was wrong."

=== Israeli support ===
During the Central American crisis, the Israeli government cooperated closely with the United States in providing supplementary military and intelligence support for US-backed regimes in the region. This was especially true in Guatemala after 1977, when U.S. support became subject to constraints stemming from the rising tensions between Guatemala and Belize and Congressional opposition to the Guatemalan government's human rights practices. While the CIA and the U.S. Green Berets continued to function covertly in Guatemala – providing training and counterinsurgency advice – a critical aspect of American support involved outsourcing operations to proxies such as Israel and Argentina. In a declassified National Security Council memo dated 1 August 1983, NSC aids Oliver North and Alfonso Sapia-Bosch reported to National Security Advisor William P. Clark that his deputy Robert McFarlane was planning to exploit Israeli intelligence networks to secretly arrange for the loan of 10 UH-1H "Huey" helicopters to Guatemala, which lacked the FMS (Foreign Military Sales) credits to obtain the helicopters. The memo reads, "With regard to the loan of ten helicopters, it is [our] understanding that Bud [Robert McFarlane] will take this up with the Israelis. There are expectations that they would be forthcoming."

By 1983, the New York Times reported that Israel was not only acting as a surrogate for the United States (in a similar fashion to its actions in Nicaragua), but also working to oppose the Soviet Union and grow the market for Israeli arms. The Stockholm International Peace Research Institute (SIPRI) calculates that 39 percent of Guatemala's weapons imports between 1975 and 1979 were from Israel. These shipments included IMI Galil automatic rifles, IMI Uzi submachine guns, FN MAG general purpose machine guns, IAI Arava STOL aircraft, RBY MK 1 armored cars, patrol boats, field kitchens, and large quantities of ammunition.

Numerous sources – including the Israeli press – estimated that up to 300 Israeli advisors were operating in Guatemala. The nature of Israel's advisory role in Guatemala included training in intelligence and surveillance and courses in urban counterinsurgency. With funding from USAID, Israeli specialists – acting as subcontractors for the United States – held torture workshops with the Contras in Guatemala, Nicaragua and Honduras. High-ranking officers from Guatemala also attended courses in interrogation in Tel-Aviv – also with funds from USAID.

Though primarily a proxy for the United States, impact of Israeli training and the role of Israeli advisors in prosecuting the war during this period was publicly emphasized numerous times by top-ranking Guatemalan military officials during the 1980s. In 1981, Guatemalan Army Chief-of-Staff Gen. Benedicto Lucas Garcia – the architect of the Guatemalan army's "scorched-earth" policy – proclaimed that the "Israeli soldier is the model for our soldiers". In a 1982 interview with ABC News, Gen. Efraín Ríos Montt attributed the success of his coup to the fact that his soldiers "were trained by Israelis". General Rodolfo Lobos Zamora, a leading military official during the conflict, mentioned the United States, Israel, and Argentina as countries that "spontaneously" offered military aid Guatemala. Despite some public praise for Israel, some Guatemalan officials were nonetheless critical of Israel's role. General Héctor Gramajo stated in an interview, "Maybe some Israeli's taught us intelligence but for reasons of business...The hawks (Israeli arms merchants) took advantage of us, selling us equipment at triple the price."

=== Argentine support ===
Military regimes in the South American Southern Cone provided material support and training to the Guatemalan government. Argentina in particular was a prominent source of both material aid and inspiration to the Guatemalan military. Many of the tactics used by the Guatemalan security forces were similar to those used by Argentina during the Dirty War. Argentina's involvement with the Guatemalan government fit within the broader context of Operation Charly, a covert operation (backed by the CIA) aimed at providing intelligence training and counterinsurgency assistance to the governments in El Salvador, Honduras and Guatemala as a supplement to U.S. operations in the region.

Argentine involvement in Guatemala is believed to have begun in 1980 and consisted of training in counterinsurgency methods, many of which were employed by the Videla regime during its own "dirty war" against leftist "subversives" and suspected guerrillas. Argentine military advisors sent to Guatemala (as well as El Salvador and Honduras) were veterans of the "dirty war" who were familiar with the techniques employed by the military and security forces and were experienced in the use of torture and political assassination. A squadron of the notorious Batallón de Inteligencia 601 (Argentina's elite special forces battalion) worked directly with the death squads. Through its connections in the Guatemalan security forces, the Argentines were involved with the 'Secret Anticommunist Army' (ESA) carried out thousands of assassinations of leftist political activists, students, unionists and others in Guatemala City during the Lucas Garcia regime as part of its "pacification campaign." Argentine military advisors also participated in the Guatemalan army's rural counteroffensive in 1981 during "Operation Ash 81". Argentina's collaboration with the governments in Central America came to an end during the Falklands War in 1982.

One Argentine intelligence officer who is known to have been active in Guatemala during this time is Alfredo Mario Mingolla, who participated in the 1980 'Cocaine Coup' in Bolivia which put General Luis García Meza in power. With the help of former SS officer and Nazi German war criminal Klaus Barbie and Argentine advisors such as Mingolla, the Bolivian regime violently repressed its opposition. Mingolla was also one of the Argentine advisors known to have been involved in training Battalion 3–16 in Honduras with the CIA, which was responsible for hundreds of disappearances. In Guatemala, Mingolla worked with the military intelligence services (G-2), which was responsible for coordinating many of the assassinations and disappearances in Guatemala.

In addition to training officers in Guatemala, Argentine advisors are alleged to have trained Guatemalan officers in Honduras. Argentine training of Guatemalans in Honduras has been attested to by a defector from Battalion 3–16, Jose Federico Valle, who described his training in intelligence in 1980. Valle was one of 120 trainees from several Central American countries who attended courses offered by American, Argentine, Chilean and Panamanian advisors. Valle claims that among these trainees were 60 to 70 officers from El Salvador and Guatemala. Guatemalans were also trained in Argentina as well. In October 1981, the Guatemalan government and the Argentine military junta formalized secret accords which augmented Argentine participation in government counterinsurgency operations. As part of the agreement, two hundred Guatemalan officers were dispatched to Buenos Aires to undergo advanced military intelligence training, which included instruction in interrogation.

Argentina also provided shipments of military hardware to the Guatemalan regime in the late-1970s and early-1980s, though the scale of these shipments is unknown. The government of Argentina is known to have supplied quantities of Israeli-made weapons and hardware to the Guatemalan military on several occasions.

=== South African support ===
During the 1980s, the Guatemalan intelligence services had covert ties with South Africa. It is known that South Africa provided the Guatemalan government with military advice and training in counterinsurgency tactics based on those the SADF and paramilitary forces (such as the Koevoet) employed in Namibia and elsewhere. Of particular interest to the G-2 was the experience that the South Africans had in fighting Cuban forces in Angola. This cooperation coincided with a time when South Africa enjoyed warm relations with the United States and Israel, both of which were key allies of the Guatemalan regime. At the time, the CIA was actively supporting the apartheid regime's efforts to undermine the MPLA government in Angola, mainly through its support of UNITA. Israel had also helped South Africa develop its own arms industry at a time when it was becoming increasingly internationally isolated.

While the full extent of this cooperation is unknown, it is reported that a number of Guatemalan officers traveled to South Africa and Namibia in early 1983 to study South African techniques being employed against the SWAPO independence movement. South Africa is also alleged to have offered to deploy counterinsurgency troops to Guatemala, though what was made of this offer by their Guatemalan counterparts is unknown. It was also reported in November of the following year, that high ranking South African Generals L.B. Erasmus and Alexander Potgeiter headed an SADF delegation to Guatemala which toured Guatemalan military bases and installations and held talks with high-ranking officials of the Mejia Victores government to discuss military aid.

== See also ==
- Salvadoran Civil War
- Saint Archbishop Oscar Romero
- Colombian Armed Conflict
- List of civil wars
- List of wars involving Guatemala
- MINUGUA: United Nations verification/peacekeeping mission in Guatemala, 1994–2004
- Guatemala National Police Archives
- Assassinated Catholic priests in Guatemala
- Blessed Rev. Fr. Stanley Rother
- Latin America–United States relations
- 2005 Guatemalan protests

=== Bibliography ===
- Amnesty International (1981). Guatemala: A Government Program of Political Murder. An Amnesty International Report Series. Amnesty International Publications. p. 32. ISBN 978-0-86210-026-1.
- Anderson, Thomas P. (1988). Politics in Central America: Guatemala, El Salvador, Honduras, and Nicaragua (revised ed.). Greenwood Publishing Group. p. 256. ISBN 978-0-275-92883-4.
- Arévalo Martínez, Rafael (1945). ¡Ecce Pericles! (in Spanish). Guatemala: Tipografía Nacional.
- Arias, Arturo (1990). "Changing Indian Identity: Guatemala's Violent Transition to Modernity". In Carol Smith (ed.). Guatemalan Indians and the State, 1540 to 1988. Austin: University of Texas Press.
- Ball, Patrick; Kobrak, Paul; Spirer, Herbert F. "State Violence in Guatemala, 1960–1996: A Quantitative Reflection". AAAS.org. Chapter 4. Archived from the original on 5 May 2013.
- Baily, John (1850). Central America; Describing Each of the States of Guatemala, Honduras, Salvador, Nicaragua, and Costa Rica. London: Trelawney Saunders. p. 87.
- Beckett, Ian; Pimlott, John (2011). Counter Insurgency: Lessons from history. Pen and Sword. p. 240. ISBN 978-1-84884-396-7.
- Benz, Stephen Connely (1996). Guatemalan Journey. University of Texas Press. ISBN 978-0-292-70840-2.
- Castellanos Cambranes, Julio (1992). Tendencias del desarrollo agrario, en 500 años de lucha por la tierra (in Spanish). Vol. 1. Guatemala: FLACSO.
- CDI (1 January 1998). "The World at War". The Defense Monitor.
- Centeno, Miguel (2007). Warfare in Latin America. International library of essays on military history. Vol. 2. Ashgate. ISBN 978-0-7546-2486-8.
- CIDH (1999). "Organizing and Repression in the University of San Carlos, Guatemala, 1944 to 1996: 1983–1989: The Illusion of Democracy". SHR, AAAS. Archived from the original on 6 May 2013.
- — (1981). "Guatemala 1981, Chapter IX". CIDH.
- Comisión para el Esclarecimiento Histórico (1999). Atentados contra sedes municipales. Vol. IV. Archived from the original on 22 May 2011.
- Corte Interamericana de Derechos Humanos (19 June 2014). "Scientific Responsibility, Human Rights & Law Program &#124". Shr.aaas.org.
- Corte internacional de La Haya (1955). "Nottebohm case (second phase). Judgement of April 6th, 1955" (PDF). I.C.J. Reports (in English and French): 4. Archived from the original (PDF) on 10 February 2012.
- Chapman, Peter (2007). Bananas: How the United Fruit Company Shaped the World. Canongate Books Ltd. ISBN 978-1-84195-881-1.
- Chomsky, Noam; Herman, Edward (2014). The Washington Connection and Third World Fascism: The Political Economy of Human Rights. Vol. I. Haymarket Books. p. 462. ISBN 978-1-60846-448-7.
- Collectif (2011). "Perenco: explotar petróleo cueste lo que cueste" (PDF). Une seule planète (in Spanish). Guatemala. Archived from the original (PDF) on 18 February 2015.
- "Caso ilustrativo No. 13". Guatemala: Memoria del Silencio (in Spanish). 1999. Archived from the original (online edition) on 6 May 2013.
- "Caso ilustrativo No. 44". Guatemala: Memoria del Silencio (in Spanish). 1999. Archived from the original (online edition) on 6 May 2013.
- "Caso ilustrativo No. 60". Guatemala: Memoria del Silencio (in Spanish). 1999. Archived from the original (online edition) on 6 May 2013.
- "Caso ilustrativo No. 61". Guatemala: Memoria del Silencio (in Spanish). 1999. Archived from the original (online edition) on 6 May 2013.
- "Caso ilustrativo No. 73". Guatemala: Memoria del Silencio (in Spanish). 1999. Archived from the original (online edition) on 6 May 2013.
- "Caso ilustrativo No. 77". Guatemala: Memoria del Silencio (in Spanish). 1999. Archived from the original (online edition) on 6 May 2013.
- "Caso ilustrativo No. 78". Guatemala: Memoria del Silencio (in Spanish). 1999. Archived from the original (online edition) on 6 May 2013.
- "Caso ilustrativo No. 92". Guatemala: Memoria del Silencio (in Spanish). 1999. Archived from the original (online edition) on 6 May 2013.
- "Caso ilustrativo No. 97". Guatemala: Memoria del Silencio (in Spanish). 1999. Archived from the original (online edition) on 6 May 2013.
- "Caso ilustrativo No. 107". Guatemala: Memoria del Silencio (in Spanish). 1999. Archived from the original (online edition) on 6 May 2013.
- "Caso ilustrativo No. 110". Guatemala: Memoria del Silencio (in Spanish). 1999. Archived from the original (online edition) on 6 May 2013.
- "Conclusions: The Tragedy of the Armed Confrontation" (online edition). Guatemala: Memoria del Silencio. Comisión para el Esclarecimiento Histórico: Conclusions. 1999.
- Compagnie Belge de Colonisation (1844). "Colonisation du district de Santo-Thomas de Guatemala par la Communauté de l'Union". Collection de Renseignements Publiés Ou Recueillis Par la Compagnie (in French).
- Cullather, Nicholas (23 May 1997). CIA and Assassinations: The Guatemala 1954 Documents. National Security Archive Electronic. Vol. Briefing Book No. 4. George Washington University: National Security Archive.
- Cullather, Nicholas (2006). Secret History: The CIA's Classified Account of its Operations in Guatemala 1952–54 (2nd ed.). Stanford University Press. ISBN 978-0-8047-5468-2.
- De los Ríos, Efraín (1946). Ombres contra Hombres (in Spanish). México: Fondo de la Cultura de la Universidad de México.
- Diario de Centro América (2 June 1978). "Entrevista a Walter Overdick, alcalde de Panzós". Diario de Centro América, Periódico Oficial de la República de Guatemala (in Spanish).
- Dosal, Paul (1995). Doing Business with the Dictators: A Political History of United Fruit in Guatemala, 1899–1944. Nueva York: Rowman and Littlefield.
- Dunkerley, James (1988). Title Power in the Isthmus: A Political History of Modern Central America. Verso. p. 691. ISBN 978-0-86091-912-4.
- Forster, Cindy (2001). The time of freedom: campesino workers in Guatemala's October Revolution. University of Pittsburgh Press. ISBN 978-0-8229-4162-0.
- El Periódico (31 January 2012). "Quema de embajada española". elPeriódico (in Spanish). Archived from the original on 30 October 2013.
- Esparza, Marcia; Huttenbach, Henry R.; Feierstein, Daniel (2009). State Violence and Genocide in Latin America: The Cold War Years. Routledge. ISBN 978-1-135-24495-8.
- Evans; Jacobson; Putnam (1993). Double-Edged Diplomacy: International Bargaining and Domestic Politics. p. 337.
- Figueroa, Luis (2011). "Bombazo en el Palacio Nacional". Luis Figueroa Carpe Diem | Periodismo de Reflexión, Por la Libertad y la Razón (in Spanish). Archived from the original on 26 June 2014.
- Fried, Jonathan L. (1983). Guatemala in rebellion: unfinished history. Grove Press.
- Garcia Ferreira, Roberto (2008). "The CIA and Jacobo Arbenz: The story of a disinformation campaign". Journal of Third World Studies. XXV (2): 59.
- * Gobernatura Departamental de Baja Verapaz (5 May 1978). Audiencia del 5 de mayo de 1978 (in Spanish). Cobán, Guatemala. "signatories: colonel Benigno Álvarez S., Alta Verapaz governor, and Flavio Monzón, Héctor Monzón, Raúl Aníbal Ayala, Joaquín González, Mario Cazs and José María Borges"
- Gleijeses, Piero (1992). Shattered hope: the Guatemalan revolution and the United States, 1944–1954. Princeton University Press. ISBN 978-0-691-02556-8.
- González Davison, Fernando (2008). La montaña infinita; Carrera, caudillo de Guatemala (in Spanish). Guatemala: Artemis y Edinter. ISBN 978-84-89452-81-7.
- Grandin, Greg; Klein, Naomi (2011). The Last Colonial Massacre: Latin America in the Cold War. Chicago, IL: University of Chicago Press. ISBN 978-0-226-30690-2.
- Harbury, Jennifer (2005). Truth, Torture, and the American Way: The History and Consequences of U.S. Involvement in Torture.
- Hey, Hilde (1995). Gross Human Rights Violations: A Search for Causes. A Study of Guatemala and Costa Rica. Martinus Nijhoff. ISBN 978-90-411-0146-4.
- Immerman, Richard H. (1983). The CIA in Guatemala: The Foreign Policy of Intervention. University of Texas Press. ISBN 978-0-292-71083-2.
- Informe REHMI (n.d.). "Recuperación de la Memoria Histórica: Tomo II. Los Mecanismos de la violencia". Derechos Humanos Website (in Spanish). Archived from the original on 15 June 2012.
- Jonas, Susanne (1991). The battle for Guatemala: rebels, death squads, and U.S. power (5th ed.). Westview Press. p. 22. ISBN 978-0-8133-0614-8.
- Justice Republic (11 May 2013). "Entrevista completa Ríos Montt: Yo controlo al ejército". YouTube (in Spanish). Archived from the original on 19 December 2021.
- Koeppel, Dan (2008). Banana: The Fate of the Fruit That Changed the World. New York: Hudson Street Press. p. 153. ISBN 978-1-101-21391-9.
- Krehm, William (1999). Democracies and Tyrannies of the Caribbean in the 1940s. COMER Publications. ISBN 978-1-896266-81-7.
- La otra memoria histórica (5 December 2011). "Guatemala, viudas y huérfanos que dejó el comunismo". La otra memoria histórica (in Spanish). Guatemala. Archived from the original on 7 December 2013.
- LaFeber, Walter (1993). Inevitable revolutions: the United States in Central America. W. W. Norton & Company. pp. 77–79. ISBN 978-0-393-30964-5.
- La Hora (2013). "Una crónica impactante en el aniversario de la quema de la Embajada de España tras 33 años de impunidad". Diario La Hora (in Spanish). Archived from the original on 7 December 2013.
- "Guatemala, viudas y huérfanos que dejó el comunismo". La otra memoria histórica (in Spanish). Guatemala. 5 December 2011. Archived from the original on 7 December 2013.
- Latin America Working Group (1991). Central American Update. Vol. 1–7.
- Levenson-Estrada, Deborah (Winter 2003). "The Life That Makes Us Die/The Death That Makes Us Live: Facing Terrorism in Guatemala City". Radical History Review. 2003 (85): 94–104. doi:10.1215/01636545-2003-85-94. S2CID 143353418.
- Levenson-Estrada, Deborah (1994). Trade Unionists Against Terror: Guatemala City, 1954-1985. UNC Press Books. ISBN 978-0-8078-4440-3.
- Longan, John. Memo of 1966 from Longan to Byron Engle, Director of OPS, re: consultation in Guatemala and plans. National Security Archive Electronic. Vol. Briefing Book No. 11. George Washington University: National Security Archive.
- Lopes, Paul D. (1985). The Agrarian Crises in Modern Guatemala. Madison, WI: University of Wisconsin.
- Loveman, Brian; Davies, Thomas M. (1997). The Politics of antipolitics: the military in Latin America (3rd, revised ed.). Rowman & Littlefield. ISBN 978-0-8420-2611-6.
- Martínez Peláez, Severo (1990). La Patria del Criollo (in Spanish). México: Ediciones En Marcha. p. 858.
- McClintock, Michael (1985). "State Terror and Popular Resistance in Guatemala". The American Connection. Vol. 2. London, UK: Zed. ISBN 978-0-86232-259-5.
- McCleary, Rachel (1999). Dictating Democracy: Guatemala and the End of Violent Revolution (Illustrated ed.). University Press of Florida. ISBN 978-0-8130-1726-6.
- McCreery, David (1994). Rural Guatemala, 1760–1940. Stanford University Press. ISBN 978-0-8047-2318-3.
- Menton, Seymour; Goodsell, James Nelson; Jonas, Susanne (1973). Report from Ad Hoc committee on Guatemala. Latin American Studies Association.
- Minority Rights Group International (1994). Minority Rights Group International Report. The Group. p. 1981. ISBN 978-1-897693-40-7.
- NACLA (1987). NACLA Report on The Americas. Vol. 21. North American Congress on Latin America.
- Paterson, Thomas G.; et al. (2009). American Foreign Relations: A History, Volume 2: Since 1895. Cengage Learning. ISBN 978-0-547-22569-2.
- PBS (30 December 1996). "Guatemala's future". PBS.org. Archived from the original on 26 August 2009.
- Pike, John (n.d.). "Guatemala". Globalsecurity.org.
- Platero Trabanino, Oscar German (2013). "La farsa del genocidio en Guatemala" (PDF). Fundación Contra el Terrorismo (in Spanish).
- Rabe, Stephen G. (1988). Eisenhower and Latin America: The Foreign Policy of Anticommunism. Chapel Hill: University of North Carolina Press. ISBN 978-0-8078-4204-1.
- Rakosy, Betsy (23 May 2002). "Victimization – the EXMIBAL Story". MAC: Mines and communities. Archived from the original on 6 October 2014.
- Ramcharan, B.G. (1985). The Right to Life in International Law. Hague Academy of International Law: Center for Studies and Research. ISBN 978-90-247-3074-2.
- Richards, Michael (1985). "Cosmopolitan world-view and counterinsurgency in Guatemala". Anthropological Quarterly. 58 (3): 94. doi:10.2307/3317916. JSTOR 3317916.
- Sabino, Carlos (2007). Guatemala, la historia silenciada (1944–1989). Tomo 1: Revolución y Liberación (in Spanish). Guatemala: Fondo Nacional para la Cultura Económica.
- Schirmer, Jennifer (1988). The Guatemalan Military Project: A Violence Called Democracy. Philadelphia, PA: University of Pennsylvania Press. ISBN 978-0-8122-3325-4.
- Schirmer, Jennifer G. (1998). The Guatemalan Military Project: A Violence Called Democracy. University of Pennsylvania Press. ISBN 978-0-8122-1730-8.
- Solano, Luis (2012). Contextualización histórica de la Franja Transversal del Norte (FTN) (PDF) (in Spanish). Centro de Estudios y Documentación de la Frontera Occidental de Guatemala, CEDFOG. Archived from the original (PDF) on 13 November 2014.
- Streeter, Stephen M. (2000). Managing the counterrevolution: the United States and Guatemala, 1954–1961. Ohio University Press. ISBN 978-0-89680-215-5.
- Striffler, Steve; Moberg, Mark (2003). Banana wars: power, production, and history in the Americas. Duke University Press. ISBN 978-0-8223-3196-4.
- The American Watch Committee (23 November 1982). Human Rights in Guatemala: no neutrals allowed; an American Watch Report (PDF). The American Watch Committee.
- The Council of Hemispheric Affairs (1981). Guatemala and El Salvador, Latin America's worst human rights violators in 1980 : Central America replaces Southern Cone as epicenter of the region's most repressive regimes: Argentina, Chile, Haiti, Uruguay, Bolivia, Paraguay and Guyana also denounced for excessive violations of human rights. Washington, D.C.: Council of Hemispheric Affairs.
- Torres Rivas, Edelberto (1980). "Guatemala: Crisis and Political Violence". NACLA Report on the Americas. Vol. 14–18. North American Congress on Latin America.
- Uekert, Brenda (1995). Rivers of Blood: A Comparative Study of Government Massacres. Greenwood Publishing Group. p. 240. ISBN 978-0-275-95165-8.
- "Guatemala, Government of Guatemala – civilians". Conflict Encyclopedia. Uppsala Conflict Data Program. Archived from the original on 5 March 2016.
- US Department of State (23 October 1967). Guatemala: A Counter-Insurgency Running Wild? (PDF). National Security Archive Electronic. Vol. Briefing Book No. 32. George Washington University: National Security Archive. p. 1.
- US State Department (1967). "Guatemala". Assignment terror: The Army's Special Unit. National Security Archive Electronic. Vol. Briefing Book No. George Washington University: National Security Archive.
- US Department of State (28 March 1986). Guatemala's Disappeared: 1977–86. George Washington University: Department of State, secret report.
- US State Department (4 February 1974). Subject: Internal Security: "Death Squad" Strikes (PDF). George Washington University: U.S. Department of State, Secret cable.
- Velásquez, S. (8 August 1997). "Crímenes de la Guerrilla" (PDF). Revista Crónica (in Spanish).
- Vice President's Task Force on Combating Terrorism (1989). Terrorist Group Profiles (Illustrated ed.). Washington, D.C.: DIANE. p. 86. ISBN 978-1-56806-864-0.
- Wilhelm of Sweden (1922). Between two continents, notes from a journey in Central America, 1920. London, UK: E. Nash and Grayson, Ltd. pp. 148–209.
- Wilkinson, Daniel (2002). Silence on the Mountain: Stories of Terror, Betrayal, and Forgetting in Guatemala. Houghton Mifflin. ISBN 978-0-618-22139-4.
