= List of wars involving Guatemala =

This is a list of wars involving the Republic of Guatemala.

== List ==
Conflict	Combatant 1	Combatant 2	Results
Guatemalan Invasions of Los Altos (1838-1840)	Guatemala	Los Altos	Victory: Los Altos is re-annexed to Guatemala
Caste War of Yucatán (1847–1933)	Mexico; Guatemala; Republic of Yucatán (1847–1848); British Honduras (from 1897)	Chan Santa Cruz; Supported by: United Kingdom: British Honduras (until 1897); Maya people	1847–1883: Mayan victory: State of Chan Santa Cruz established.; 1884–1915: Mexican victory: Mexico recaptures the Yucatan Peninsula.; Minor clashes until 1933.
Los Altan Revolts (1844, 1847-1849)	Guatemala	Los Altos	Victory: Revolts suppressed; Death of Agustín Guzmán
Battle of La Arada (1851)	Guatemala	El Salvador; Honduras; Guatemalan Liberals	Guatemalan victory
Filibuster War (1855–1857)	Allied Central American Army; Nicaragua; Costa Rica; El Salvador; Guatemala; Honduras; Legitimist Party	Filibusters; Walker's Nicaragua; Democratic Party	Central American alliance victory
War of 1863 (1863)	Guatemala; Salvadoran exiles; Supported by: Costa Rica; Nicaragua	El Salvador; Honduras	Guatemalan victory: Overthrow of Gerardo Barrios
Barrios' War of Reunification (1885)	Guatemala; Honduras	El Salvador; Mexico; Costa Rica; Nicaragua	Anti-Barrios victory: Failure to reunify Central America; Death of Justo Rufino Barrios
Totoposte Wars (1890-1906)	First Totoposte War; Guatemala; Salvadoran exiles; Second Totoposte War; Guatemala; Third Totoposte War; Guatemala	First Totoposte War; El Salvador; Second Totoposte War; El Salvador; Mexico; Guatemalan exiles; Third Totoposte War; El Salvador; Mexico; Guatemalan exiles	Status quo ante bellum
First Totoposte War (1890)	First Totoposte War; Guatemala; Salvadoran exiles	First Totoposte War; El Salvador	Status quo ante bellum
Second Totoposte War (1903)	Second Totoposte War; Guatemala	Second Totoposte War; El Salvador; Mexico; Guatemalan exiles	Status quo ante bellum
Third Totoposte War (1906)	Third Totoposte War; Guatemala	Third Totoposte War; El Salvador; Mexico; Guatemalan exiles	Status quo ante bellum
World War I (1918)	France; United Kingdom; Russia; United States; Italy; Japan; China; Canada; Australia; New Zealand; India; South Africa; Serbia; Montenegro; Romania; Belgium; Greece; Portugal; Brazil; Cuba; Panama; Guatemala; Nicaragua; Costa Rica; Honduras	Germany; Austria-Hungary; Ottoman Empire; Bulgaria	Victory: End of the German, Russian, Ottoman, and Austro-Hungarian empires; Formation of new countries in Europe and the Middle East; Transfer of German colonies and regions of the former Ottoman Empire to other powers; Establishment of the League of Nations
World War II (1941–1945)	United States; Soviet Union; United Kingdom; China; France; Poland; Canada; Australia; New Zealand; India; South Africa; Yugoslavia; Greece; Denmark; Norway; Netherlands; Belgium; Luxembourg; Czechoslovakia; Brazil; Mexico; Panama; Costa Rica; El Salvador; Guatemala; Honduras; Nicaragua; Dominican Republic; Cuba	Germany; Japan; Italy; Hungary; Romania; Bulgaria; Croatia; Slovakia; Finland; Thailand; Manchukuo; Mengjiang	Victory: Collapse of the Third Reich; Fall of Japanese and Italian Empires; Creation of the United Nations; Emergence of the United States and the Soviet Union as superpowers; Beginning of the Cold War
Mexico–Guatemala Conflict (1958–1959)	Guatemala	Mexico	Ceasefire: Relations between the two nations were frozen for several months
Guatemalan Civil War (1960–1996)	Government of Guatemala and Guatemalan military Government-led paramilitary organizations: Mano Blanca; Supported by: United States (1962–1996); Argentina (1976–1983) Logistics: Israel; Taiwan; Chile; South Africa	URNG (from 1982) PGT (until 1998); MR-13 (1960–1971); FAR (1960–1971); EGP (1971–1996); ORPA (1979–1996) Supported by: Cuba; FMLN; Nicaragua (1979–1990)	Peace accord signed in 1996: Guatemala border; Franja Transversal del Norte
