= VDG =

VDG may refer to:

- Viola da Gamba, a bowed and fretted string instrument that is played da gamba (i.e. "on the leg") also called a Viol
- Guatemalan Democratic Vanguard (Vanguardia Democrática Guatemalteca), a Guatemalan leftwing political group
- Giedo van der Garde, Dutch Formula One racing driver
- Van de Graaff generator, high voltage electrostatic generator developed by Robert J. Van de Graaff
- Video Display Generator, an integrated circuit found in computer video systems
- Several people with Dutch surnames including Van der Geest and Van de Graaf
- Veneral disease gonorrhea
