= Flag of Guatemala =

Republic of Guatemala
- Use: State and war flag, state and naval ensign
- Proportion: 5:8
- Adopted: 17 August 1871; 155 years ago
- Design: A vertical triband of Maya blue (hoist-side and fly-side) and white with the national emblem centered on the white band.
- Civil ensign
- Use: Civil flag and ensign
- Proportion: 5:8
- Adopted: 17 August 1871
- Design: A vertical triband of Maya blue (hoist-side and fly-side) and white.

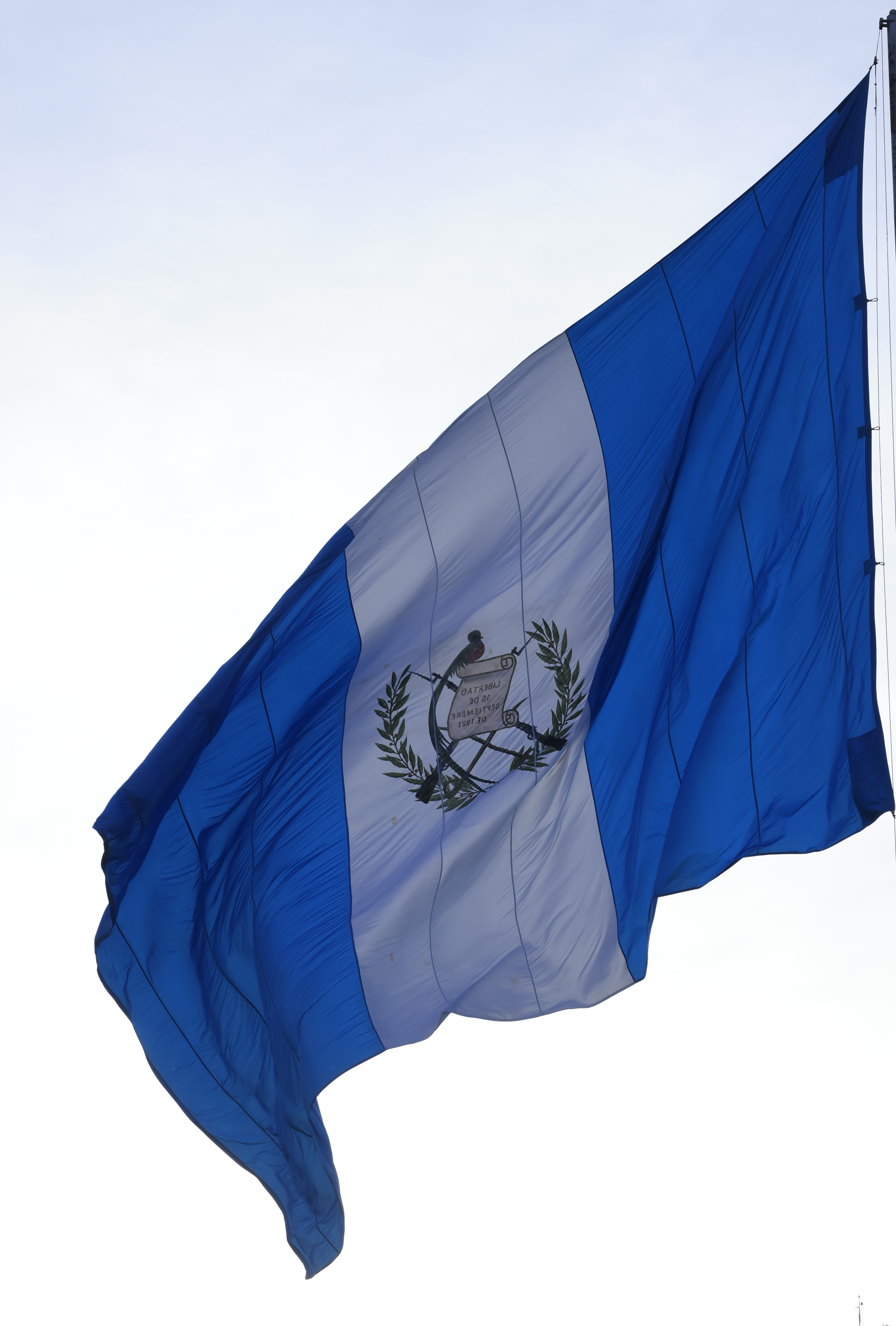
Flag of Guatemala flying on an outdoor flagpole

La Granadera
"La Granadera" is the official march of the national flag and the president of Guatemala

The flag of Guatemala, often referred to as the National Pavilion (Pabellón nacional) or the Blue-and-White (Azul y Blanco), features two colors: sky blue and white. According to decree, the two sky blue stripes represents strength, justice, truth and loyalty. The white color signifies purity, integrity, firmness and light. The blue and white colors, like those of several other countries in the region, are based on the flag of the former Federal Republic of Central America.

In the center of the flag is the Guatemalan coat of arms. It includes the resplendent quetzal, the national bird of Guatemala that symbolizes liberty; a parchment scroll bearing the date of Central America's independence from Spain, 15 September 1821; crossed Remington Rolling Block rifles, indicating Guatemala's willingness to defend itself by force if need be; a bay laurel crown, the symbol for victory; and crossed swords, representing honor. It is one of four national flags among UN member states that features a firearm, along with those of Mozambique, Haiti, and Bolivia.

It is one of five national flags that use the ratio 5:8, with the others being Argentina, Palau, Poland, and Sweden.

== History ==
The flag of the Federal Republic of Central America was used in Guatemala until 1851, when a pro-Spanish faction took over and added the Spanish colors of red and yellow to the flag. The original colors were restored on 17 August 1871, but as vertical (rather than horizontal) stripes in order to distinguish it from other flags and with a new coat of arms.

The resplendent quetzal previously appeared in the 1830s in the flag of Los Altos, the sixth state in the Federal Republic.

In 2008 a flag called the Bandera de Los Pueblos (Flag of indigenous peoples) was adopted by law and is shown together with the national flag of Guatemala in all events featuring the President of Guatemala since then. The flag is divided in four parts, red, yellow, white and black, each colour representing Xinca people, Garifuna people, Maya people, and Ladino people, respectively.

These colours are also part of the Qʼanil, a Maya symbol in which each color represents a point of the compass, an element of nature and a part of the human being. Qʼanil means "seed" in K'iche', and is also one of the 20 days of the Tzolk'in Maya calendar. Aimed at promoting "interculturality" in Guatemala, the Bandera de los Pueblos was received with disinterest by the leaders of the peoples, who do not seem to have been consulted.

=== Promoting the flag ===
Since 1961, 17 August has been commemorated as Flag Day.

== Colors ==
Color scheme	Maya blue	White
Pantone	297	Safe
RGB	73-151-208	255-255-255
CMYK	64.9-27.4-0-18.4	0-0-0-0-0
Web colors	4997D0	FFFFFF

== Ethnic group flags ==
Flag	Use
	Bandera de los Pueblos, flag attributed to indigenous peoples.
	Flag of the Maya people
	Flag of the Garifuna

== Government flags ==
Flag of the president of Guatemala

Flag of the vice president of Guatemala

Flag of the president of the Congress of Guatemala

Flag of the president of the Supreme Court of Justice Guatemala

== Military flags ==
Flag	Use
	Flag of the Minister of Defence
	Flag of the Chief of the General Staff

== Political flags ==
Flag	Use
	Flag of the National Liberation Movement
	Flag of the Guatemalan Party of Labour
	Flag of the Guatemalan National Revolutionary Unity

== Department flags ==
Flag	Department
	Alta Verapaz
	Baja Verapaz
	Chimaltenango
	Chiquimula
	El Progresso
	Escuintla
	Guatemala
	Huehuetenango
	Izabal
	Jalapa
	Jutiapa
	Petén
	Quetzaltenango
	Quiché
	Retalhuleu
	Sacatepéquez
	San Marcos
	Santa Rosa
	Sololá
	Suchitepéquez
	Totonicapán
	Zacapa

== Historical flags ==
The Guatemalan flag has changed throughout history, arriving to its current design in 1997.

Flag	Date	Use
	1524–1821	Flag of the Kingdom of Guatemala
	1821–1823	Flag of the First Mexican Empire
	1823–1824	Flag of the United Provinces of Central America
	1824–1838	Flag of the Federal Republic of Central America
	1825–1838	Flag of Guatemala within Central America
	1838–1843	Flag of Guatemala
	1838–1840; 1848–1849	Flag of the State of Los Altos
	1843–1851	Flag of Guatemala
	1851–1858	Flag of Guatemala
	1851–1858	State flag of Guatemala
	1858–1871	Flag of Guatemala
	1858–1871	State flag of Guatemala
	1871–1968	State flag used until 1968, similar to the modern flag but with minor differences and additions of blue and white ribbons; some variants contained red ribbons or multiple
	1871–1968	State flag of Guatemala (variant, used before c. 1920s)
	1968–1997	State flag of Guatemala
	1997–present	State flag of Guatemala
