= Marco Antonio Yon Sosa =

Guatemala revolutionary (1940–1970)

Marco Antonio Yon Sosa (7 September 1929 – May 18, 1970) was the leader of the Revolutionary Movement 13th November, a Guatemalan guerrilla organization. Yon Sosa broke with the Stalinist Rebel Armed Forces in December 1964 over the question of a ceasefire, which he opposed.

He was affiliated to the Fourth International (Posadist) from 1963 until 1966 when he was expelled from the International over accusing them of diverting funds which had been raised to support MR-13.

Yon was killed in a shootout with Mexican border police in 1970, in the Chiapas area near the Guatemalan border.

The circumstances of his death, however are disputed; Robert Lamberg notes in 1972 that Yon had been underground by that point for quite some time with the general circumstances making an armed confrontation with border forces unlikely. Gino Perente notes that Yon Sosa hadn't died in some act of revolutionary heroism at all, but in a drunken car accident in downtown Guatemala City.

Yon participated in the November 13, 1960, military uprising against president Miguel Ydígoras. Yon's father was a Chinese merchant, and under his wing, MR-13 took on a decidedly Maoist orientation. He received part of his military training from the School of the Americas.
