= Guatemalan Party of Labour – Communist Party =

Guatemalan Party of Labour – Communist Party Partido Guatemalteco del Trabajo – Partido Comunista
- Abbreviation: PGT-PC
- Founded: 1978
- Dissolved: 1983
- Split from: PGT
- Succeeded by: PGT-A
- Ideology: Communism; Marxism-Leninism
- Political position: Far-left

See Communist party (disambiguation) for other similarly named groups.

Guatemalan Party of Labour – Communist Party (in Spanish: Partido Guatemalteco del Trabajo – Partido Comunista) was an underground communist party in Guatemala. PGT-PC was formed in 1978 as a split from the Guatemalan Party of Labour (PGT).

The founders of PGT-PC belonged to two groupings within PGT. One section which participated in forming PGT-PC had only a brief period of membership in PGT. They had belonged to the Rebel Armed Forces (FAR), but had left FAR to join PGT. The other section was made up by members of the Military Commission of PGT (i.e. the armed branch of the party) in the Central Regional Committee and the Alamos Zonal Committee.

In the early 1980s PGT-PC expelled Carlos Quinteros (nom de guerre: Miguel). Quinteros had joined PGT-PC after having participated in the formation of the National Directing Nucleus of PGT (PGT-NDN). Quinteros was captured by state forces on October 9, 1983. Quinteros become a collaborator of the government armed forces. He provided information to the military about the whereabouts and identities of leaders and key cadres of PGT, PGT-NDN and PGT-PC. The arrests and killings that followed wiped out PGT-PC. Only a small section of the party remained active, regrouping itself as the Guatemalan Party of Labour – Alamos.
