= Los Altos, Province of Burgos =

Los Altos
- Municipality
- Flag Coat of arms
- Interactive map of Los Altos
- Country: Spain
- Autonomous community: Castile and León
- Province: Burgos
- Comarca: Las Merindades
- Seat: Dobro

Government
  - Mayor: Jesús Melero García (PP)

Area
  - Total: 22 km^{2} (8.5 sq mi)
  - Land: 22 km^{2} (8.5 sq mi)
  - Water: 0.00 km^{2} (0 sq mi)
- Elevation: 848 m (2,782 ft)

Population (2025-01-01)
  - Total: 177
- Time zone: UTC+1 (CET)
  - Summer (DST): UTC+2 (CEST)
- Postal code: 09559
- Website: http://www.losaltos.es/

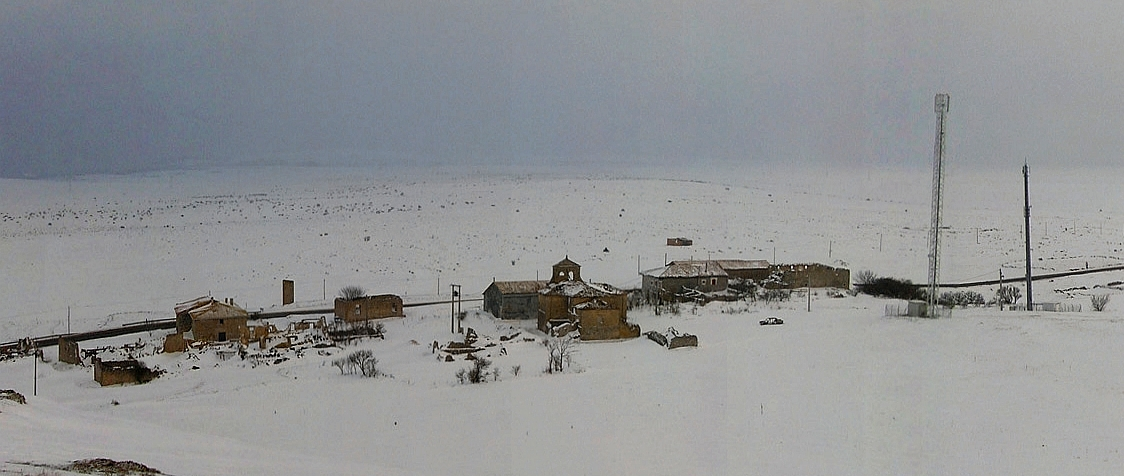
Los Altos, Province of Burgos

Los Altos is a Spanish municipality in the province of Burgos, part of the autonomous community of Castile and León.
