= Ricardo Rosales =

Ricardo Rosales may refer to:

- Ricardo Rosales (footballer) (born 1993), Argentine midfielder
- Ricardo Rosales (politician) (1934–2020), Guatemalan politician
