= Organization of People in Arms =

Guatemalan guerrilla organisation (1971-1996)

- Organización del Pueblo en Armas
- Leader: Rodrigo Asturias
- Dates active: 1971–1996
- Headquarters: Lake Atitlán; Guatemalan Highlands
- Ideology: Left-wing nationalism Anti-imperialism; Indigenismo
- Political position: Left-wing
- Part of: URNG
- Wars: Guatemalan Civil War

The Organization of People in Arms (Spanish: Organización del Pueblo en Armas, ORPA) was a Guatemalan guerrilla organization active in Guatemala during the Guatemalan Civil War. A split-off from the FAR of the 1960s, ORPA was critical of earlier guerrilla efforts in Guatemala, which they saw as a failure. ORPA focused its efforts primarily in the heavily populated highlands and southern coast, and commanded much support among the indigenous populations there.

== Formation ==
Following the 1954 Guatemalan coup d'état, Guatemala was in a state of crisis. The new government brought to power by the United States suspended constitutional guarantees, jailed thousands of political and labor leaders, and exiled hundreds of others. In the first two months of the Castillo Armas regime, as many as 8,000 peasants were murdered. This repression directly fed the guerrilla movement by cutting off all legal avenues in Guatemalan politics, making armed resistance the only real method of political expression in the minds of many Guatemalans.

Following the defeat of the FAR and the MR-13 in the late-1960s, the guerrilla leadership recognized and reflected upon the failures of the Guevarist foco strategy. One particularly important strategic failure realized by the guerrilla leadership was the inability of the guerrilla movement to incorporate the Indian population.

Out of the failures of the FAR came the FAR/Regional de Occidente – a split-off group. This group criticized the foco strategy of the FAR, claiming that it failed to address the Indian question. It would operate clandestinely from 1971, until emerging as the Organización del Pueblo en Armas (ORPA) in 1979.

== Activities ==
ORPA initially focused its operations on the Pacific Southern Coast, however, after 1971 it concentrated its forces in the heavily populated Indian highlands of Chimaltenango and Sololá. Because of ORPA's focus on the Indian population, by 1973 over 90 percent of members were of Indian descent. In the following years ORPA opened an urban front in Guatemala City, but the focus of its operations remained the central highlands.

By the early 1980s, it was clear that substantial numbers of Indian peasants throughout the highlands were supporting the guerrillas. Peasant support for the guerrillas in the area was such that ORPA could operate freely through the Chimaltenango and Solola highlands, and controlled the major resort area around Lake Atitlan. In January 1982, ORPA, along with the EGP, FAR, and PGT Núcleo joined together in the Unidad Revolucionaria Nacional Guatemalteca (URNG).

However, this increase in strength would be short-lived. In March 1982, after increasing discontent in the Guatemalan Armed Forces regarding the perceived corruption and incompetence of the military command, a group of junior officers launched a coup d'etat, overthrowing the administration of Fernando Romeo Lucas García. A new military junta was installed, with General Efraín Ríos Montt as President. The Ríos Montt administration carried out a brutal counterinsurgency campaign against the guerrillas and their alleged supporters, killing thousands of civilians in the process.

Although the new counterinsurgency campaign weakened the strength and resolve of the guerrilla forces, it did not eliminate them. By the mid-1980s, the guerrilla forces had reorganized, with ORPA playing a larger role in the URNG alliance than before.
