= National Directive Nucleus of the Guatemalan Party of Labour =

National Directive Nucleus of the Guatemalan Party of Labour Núcleo de Dirección Nacional del Partido Guatemalteco del Trabajo
- Abbreviation: PGT-NDN
- Leader: José Alberto Cardoza
- Founded: 1978
- Split from: PGT
- Ideology: Communism; Marxism-Leninism; Revolutionary socialism
- Political position: Far-left
- National affiliation: URNG

National Directive Nucleus of the Guatemalan Party of Labour (in Spanish: Núcleo de Dirección Nacional del Partido Guatemalteco del Trabajo, PGT-NDN) was a splinter group of the Guatemalan Party of Labour (PGT). PGT-NDN was formed in 1978, following an internal rift within PGT. An attack of the Military Commission of PGT against a police convoy provoked the split, in which 25 police officers were killed. The central leadership of the party had denied involvement in the attack. A minority accused the leadership of being ambiguous towards the armed struggle against the regime.

After a brief period the minority left PGT to form PGT-NDN. PGT-NDN won over the South-East Regional Committee, a part of the Southern Regional Committee and a part of the Álamos Zonal Committee (Chimaltenango) of PGT. Its leader was José Alberto Cardoza (nom de guerre: Mario Sánchez), who had been a PGT Central Committee member up to the split.

PGT-NDN had a programme of 'Revolutionary People's War'. PGT-NDN initiated a cooperation with EGP and FAR in 1979. In 1982 PGT-NDN, EGP, ORPA and FAR formed URNG as a coordinating body.

After the 1983 capture of Carlos Quinteros ('Miguel'), who had been a leading figure in both PGT-NDN and PGT-PC, PGT-NDN was almost wiped out as Quinteros provided the state forces with vast information on their leaders and members. The party remained limited to Cardoza and his closest associates.

In 1987, URNG substituted PGT-NDN for PGT in its leadership. However, the relations between PGT and PGT-NDN improved, and the two parties were able to hold a joint celebration of the 38th anniversary of the foundation of the party.

During the 1990s, PGT-NDN continued to exist but had very limited activity. Cardoza died in 2003. It is not known whether the party still exists.
