= Guatemalan Revolutionary Workers Party =

Guatemalan Revolutionary Workers Party Partido Revolucionario Obrero Guatemalteco
- Abbreviation: PROG
- Leader: Víctor Manuel Gutiérrez
- Founded: 1950
- Split from: PCG
- Merged into: PGT
- Ideology: Communism; Marxism-Leninism
- Political position: Far-left

Guatemalan Revolutionary Workers Party (in Spanish: Partido Revolucionario Obrero Guatemalteco) was a communist party in Guatemala. PROG was founded in 1950, following a split from the Communist Party of Guatemala (PCG). PROG made its first public appearance on July 1. PROG was led by Víctor Manuel Gutiérrez. The split in PCG had been provoked by discussions on the socio-economic composition of the Central Committee.

Gutiérrez, returning from a stay in Eastern Europe, declared the dissolution of PROG on February 2, 1952. The Central Committee of PROG declared that the party members were free to choose their future political course, but recommended them to join PCG. Gutiérrez joined PCG, and was elected Central Committee member of PCG.
