= Víctor Manuel Gutiérrez =

Guatemalan trade unionist (1922–1966)

Víctor Manuel Gutiérrez Garbín (10 January 1922 – 6 March 1966) was a Guatemalan labour leader. Gutiérrez, a school teacher by profession, was head of the Confederación General de Trabajadores de Guatemala (CGTG). Born in Santa Rosa, Guatemala, Gutiérrez was a devout Catholic in his youth, and he was known as a quiet, self-spoken man. He has been referred to as the most important labour leader in Guatemala from 1944 to 1954.

Gutiérrez was a member of the Communist Party of Guatemala (PCG). In 1950 he split from PCG on issues relating to the social composition of the Central Committee of the party, and he founded the Guatemalan Revolutionary Workers Party (PROG). In the fall of 1951 he travelled to Berlin for the World Federation of Trade Unions General Council Meeting and later to Moscow. On returning to Guatemala, Gutiérrez dissolved PROG on February 2, 1952, and rejoined PCG. The 2nd congress of PCG (which then changed name to Guatemalan Party of Labour, PGT), held the same year, elected Gutiérrez to the party Central Committee.

Gutiérrez remained a CC member of PGT until his death. On 3 March 1966, he was, along with other PGT leaders, arrested in a joint military and police operation designed with the aid of U.S. intelligence agents. He was tortured to death on March 6 and his corpse interred secretly in the countryside.
