= Ricardo Rosales (politician) =

Guatemalan politician (1934–2020)

Ricardo Rosales Román
- Born: February 14, 1934; Guatemala City, Guatemala
- Died: 2 January 2020 (aged 85); Guatemala City, Guatemala
- Education: Universidad de San Carlos de Guatemala
- Occupation: Newspaper columnist
- Known for: Leader of Guatemalan Party of Labour. Former Congressman
- Spouse: Ana María Arroyo Quan
- Children: Pedro, Espartaco

Ricardo Rosales Román (February 14, 1934 – January 2, 2020) was the head of the Guatemalan Party of Labour (PGT) beginning in 1974 through 1998. His nom de guerre was Carlos González. Rosales joined the leadership of the URNG in 1986. The PGT disbanded in 1998 after the conclusion of the country's civil war.

Rosales was born in Guatemala City. He was elected to several leadership posts of student organizations while studying at the Universidad de San Carlos de Guatemala in the late 1950s and early 1960s. He joined the PGT in September 1963.

He is a signatory of the 1996 Peace Accords.

He was elected as a member of the Congress of Guatemala on the URNG ticket from 2000 to 2004. As of 2009, he was a columnist for the Guatemalan daily newspaper La Hora.

He died in Guatemala City on January 2, 2020.

== See also ==
- History of Guatemala
- Guatemalan Civil War
