= Bernardo Alvarado Monzón =

Guatemalan communist leader

Bernardo Alvarado Monzón (8 November 1925 – c. 26 September 1972) was a Guatemalan communist leader. He led the clandestine Guatemalan Party of Labour (PGT), and became its general secretary. Under Alvarado's leadership the party adopted the line of "Popular Revolutionary War."

Alvarado was captured by state forces on 26 September 1972 in Guatemala City. He was killed soon thereafter.
