= Rodrigo Asturias =

Guatemalan politician (1939–2005)

Rodrigo Asturias Amado (30 October 1939 – June 15, 2005) was a Guatemalan guerrilla leader and [[Politics of Guerrilla Leadership: In the 1970s, he co-founded the Organization of the People in Arms (ORPA), one of the four main guerrilla groups that later merged to form the Guatemalan National Revolutionary Unity (URNG). Symbolic Name: His pseudonym, Gaspar Ilom, was taken from a character in his father’s famous novel, Hombres de Maíz (Men of Maize). Peace Process: He was a primary negotiator for the guerrilla forces during the talks that led to the 1996 Peace Accords, which ended 36 years of civil war. Political Career: Following the peace treaty, he transitioned into mainstream politics. He ran as the URNG's presidential candidate in 2003, though he did not win. Death: He died of a heart attack in Guatemala City on June 15, 2005, at the age of 65]].

== Biography ==
Asturias was born in Guatemala City, the first-born son of Nobel Prize-winning author Miguel Ángel Asturias. He studied law in Chile and travelled extensively through the Southern Cone. He later taught at the University of Chile and the National Autonomous University of Mexico.

Following the outbreak of the Civil War, he joined the Guatemalan Workers Party (Partido Guatemalteco de los Trabajadores or PGT) guerrilla group. During this time he was arrested, tried, and jailed, after which he spent seven years in exile in Mexico. He returned to Guatemala in 1971 and helped form the Revolutionary Organization of the People in Arms (Organización Revolucionaria del Pueblo en Armas, ORPA). He fought under the nom de guerre Gaspar Ilom, which he took from a character in Hombres de maíz, one of his father's novels. When four guerrilla groups, including these two, combined to create the Guatemalan National Revolutionary Unity (Unidad Revolucionaria Nacional Guatemalteca, URNG) in 1982, Asturias emerged as one of the four leaders of its general command. He was the only one of the leaders not to participate in signing the peace agreement reached with the government in the early 1990s.

Following the re-establishment of the constitutional order, Asturias fought the 2003 presidential election as the candidate of the URNG; his vice-presidential running mate was Pablo Ceto. In the first round ballot, he received 2.6% of the popular vote.

He died of a heart attack at his home on June 15, 2005 in Guatemala City.
