= Guatemalan Party of Labour – Alamos =

Political organization in Guatemala

Guatemalan Party of Labour – Alamos Partido Guatemalteco del Trabajo – Alamos
- Abbreviation: PGT-A
- Founded: 1983
- Preceded by: PGT-PC
- Ideology: Communism; Marxism-Leninism
- Religion: Far-left

The Guatemalan Party of Labour – Alamos (in Spanish: Partido Guatemalteco del Trabajo – Alamos) was an underground communist party in Guatemala. PGT-Alamos was formed as a regroupment of the few elements in the Alamos region of the erstwhile Guatemalan Party of Labour - Communist Party (PGT-PC) that survived the 1983 purges against the organisation.

In 1984 PGT-Alamos was joined by 8 guerrilla fighters from FAR (who had previously tried to join ORPA).

PGT-Alamos continued to exist until the late 1980s.
