= Huberto Alvarado Arellano =

Guatemalan poet and communist leader

Huberto Alvarado Arellano (1927–1974) was a Guatemalan poet, essayist, and communist political figure. He was born in 1927 and died in 1974 at the hands of paramilitary death squads. His interest in politics stemmed from his experiences in the Guatemalan Revolution of 1944-1945, which were marked by his immersion in leftist politics. He was soon named Secretary General of the Guatemalan Alliance of Democratic Youth.

At the same time, Alvarado engaged in notable cultural and literary production, mainly through the Saker-ti ("Dawn" in Kaqchikel) group, of which he had been a founder. Saker-Tí was a collective of young writers committed to democratic values and to revaluing Guatemala's native cultural legacy. The group wound up joining the Communist Party en masse and in 1949 Alvarado the group was appointed to the Central Committee of the party and later to its Political Commission.

On 17 June 1954, the democratically elected government of reformist Jacobo Arbenz was overthrown in a CIA engineered coup d'état that ended the Guatemalan Revolution. It was carried out by reactionary expatriates who entered Guatemala from Honduran territory, with US support and coordination. After the fall of the democratic government, one of the first measures passed by the new regime was the banning of the Party of Labor. Alvarado was then forced into exile, first in Ecuador and later in Mexico.

Alvarado soon returned to Guatemala and managed to live relatively quietly until he was again persecuted and jailed. An international campaign secured his release and subsequent return to exile in Mexico.

Alvarado–who was at this time serving as Secretary General of the Guatemalan Party of Labour (as the Communist Party had been renamed in 1952), after its previous Secretary General had been captured and executed at the orders of Pres. Carlos Arana–returned to his homeland in 1974. He would not live out the year.

On 20 December 1974, Huberto Alvarado was wounded and captured by government forces. The next day, his tortured and mutilated body was dumped on the outskirts of Guatemala City.
