= Carlos Quinteros =

Guatemalan politician

Carlos Quinteros (nom de guerre: Miguel) was a Guatemalan communist. Quinteros was a member of the Guatemalan Party of Labour (PGT). When PGT split in 1978, he became a leading figure in the more militant PGT-NDN breakaway group. However, he soon left PGT-NDN and joined Guatemalan Party of Labour - Communist Party (PGT-PC). Soon, however, he was expelled from PGT-PC.

In 1983, Quinteros was captured by the state forces. He soon turned into a collaborator and started providing information about his former comrades in PGT, PGT-NDN, and PGT-PC. In total, around 70 people were captured and killed. In some cases, Quinteros himself took part in the executions. PGT-PC was essentially wiped out in this process, and PGT-NDN was reduced to the party leader and closest associates in exile.

Quinteros was eventually killed by his former comrades.

This events are told in the book El Filo (1993).
