= Luis Augusto Turcios Lima =

Guatemalan army officer and leader of the Rebel Armed Forces

Luis Augusto Turcios Lima (23 November 1941 – 2 October 1966) was a Guatemalan army officer and leader of the Rebel Armed Forces (Fuerzas Armadas Rebeldes, or FAR).

Turcios Lima entered military service at age 15, graduating as second lieutenant. He then received commando training at Fort Benning, Georgia USA. On his return to Guatemala he undertook military service in Petén, and later participated in the 13 November 1960 military uprising against President Miguel Ydígoras.

He was killed in 1966 when a bomb exploded inside his car.

Eduardo Galeano writes about the mythic aspect attributed to Turcios Lima in his 1967 Guatemala: Occupied Country: "The previous leader of the Rebel Armed Forces, Luis Augusto Turcios, was also a legendary figure for the peasants, who attributed supernatural virtues to him. He was a hot-blooded young officer who learned the technique of the guerrilla from the Yanquis themselves--in a course at Fort Benning, Columbus, Ga. [i.e. School of the Americas], on how to combat it. Dictator Peralta Azurdia put a price on his head and he put one on dictator Peralta Azurdia's. After he took to the hills in 1960, he mocked death a thousand times. Absurdly, death won because his car caught fire on the highway."
