= Revolutionary Movement 13th November =

Guatemalan revolutionary organisation (1960–1963)

- Movimiento Revolucionario 13 Noviembre
- Founders: Luis Augusto Turcios Lima; Marco Antonio Yon Sosa; Luis Trejo Esquivel; Alejandro de León
- Leaders: Luis Augusto Turcios Lima; Marco Antonio Yon Sosa; Luis Trejo Esquivel
- Founded: 1960
- Dates active: 1960/1962-1973
- Merged into: FAR
- Ideology: Socialism; Left-wing nationalism
- Political position: Left-wing
- Wars: Guatemalan Civil War

Revolutionary Movement 13th November (in Spanish: Movimiento Revolucionario 13 Noviembre) was a leftist movement in Guatemala. MR-13 was founded in 1960 by a group of dissident officers. It grew partly out of the popular protests against the government of President Miguel Ydígoras Fuentes following his election in 1958. It was led by Luis Augusto Turcios Lima, Marco Antonio Yon Sosa and Luis Trejo Esquivel. Alejandro de León, co-founder of the group, was captured and shot by the judicial police in 1961. In 1963, MR-13 joined the Rebel Armed Forces (FAR).

MR-13 nominally continued to exist until 1973, after it was severely hampered in the 1966-67 counterinsurgency by the Guatemalan government.

== Origins ==
On 13 November 1960, a group of 120 young military officers joined by approximately 3000 enlisted soldiers seized the Zacapa military base and most of the Eastern Military Zone of the country and demanded the resignation of President Ydígoras. The rebels' discontent was fueled by the staggering corruption of the Ydígoras regime, the government's showing of favoritism in military promotions and in providing other rewards to officers who supported Ydígoras, and what they perceived as incompetence in running the country.

The proximate trigger for the November 13 revolt, however, was Ydígoras' decision to allow the United States to bring soldiers into Guatemala to train for the Bay of Pigs Invasion of Cuba. Ydígoras had not consulted the Guatemalan military about this arrangement, and he did not share with the military the payoff he received in exchange from the U.S. government. The military just watched while unmarked U.S. warplanes piloted by U.S.-based Cuban exiles flew in large numbers over their country. The November 13 revolt was not ideological in its origins. The rebel officers were concerned about loss of national sovereignty as the U.S. established a secret air strip and training camp at Retalhuleu to prepare for the invasion of Cuba.

== Defeat and exile ==
The U.S. Central Intelligence Agency (CIA) flew B-26 bombers disguised as Guatemalan military jets to bomb the rebel bases because the coup threatened the Guatemalan regime that the U.S. supported, as well as the CIA's plans for the invasion of Cuba. The November 13 revolt was essentially defeated after only three days. The rebels fled to neighboring Honduras and formed the kernel of what became known as MR-13.

== Return and civil war ==
In early 1962, the rebels returned to Guatemala. On 6 February in Bananera, they attacked the offices of the United Fruit Company (present day Chiquita Brands), an American corporation that controlled vast territories in Guatemala as well as in other Central American countries. The attack sparked sympathetic strikes and university student walkouts throughout the country, to which the Ydígoras regime responded with a violent crackdown. This crackdown sparked the Guatemalan Civil War.

The MR-13 later initiated contact with the outlawed PGT (Guatemalan Labour Party; composed and led by middle-class intellectuals and students) and a student organization called the Movimiento 12 de Abril (April 12 Movement) and together with these groups merged into a coalition guerilla organization called the Rebel Armed Forces (FAR) in December 1962. Also affiliated with the FAR was the FGEI (Edgar Ibarra Guerrilla Front) led by Luis Augusto Turcios Lima. The MR-13, PGT and the FGEI each operated in different parts of the country as three separate "frentes" (fronts). The MR-13 established itself in the mostly ladino departments of Izabal and Zacapa; the FGEI established itself in Sierra de las Minas; and the PGT operated as an urban guerrilla front. The three "frentes" (each comprising no more than 500 combatants) were led by former members of the 1960 army revolt, who had previously been trained in counterinsurgency warfare by the United States.

The U.S. government supported the Guatemalan junta in the Guatemalan Civil War against MR-13 and other rebel factions as well as the civilians who supported them. A 1968 CIA report stated: "With some assistance from Cuba, the small band, under the leadership of Marco Antonio Yon Sosa, engaged in sporadic terrorist acts, including harassment of communications lines, buses, and railroad tracks, pillaging of military supply points and plantations for money and arms, assassination of army collaborators, and attacks on commercial and official installations." An estimated 200,000 civilians were killed or "disappeared" during the civil war, most at the hands of the military, police and intelligence services of the Guatemalan regime. Victims of the repression included the Maya indigenous people, activists, suspected government opponents, returning refugees, critical academics, students, left-leaning politicians, trade unionists, religious workers, journalists, and street children on a scale that has been termed the Guatemalan genocide. The "Comisión para el Esclarecimiento Histórico" has estimated that 93% of violence in the conflict was committed by government forces and 3% by the guerrillas.
