= Luis Batres Juarros =

Guatemalan politician (1802–1862)

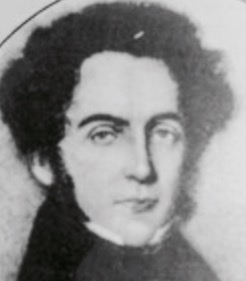

Guatemala City Mayor
- In office 1845–1846
- President: Rafael Carrera

Counsellor of State Republic of Guatemala
- In office 1847–1860
- President: Rafael Carrera

Personal details
- Born: 7 May 1802 Nueva Guatemala de la Asunción
- Died: 17 June 1862 (aged 60)
- Party: Conservative
- Spouse: Adelaida García Granados y Zavala (Note: Sister of both Miguel García Granados and María Josefa García Granados. Aunt of María García Granados y Saborío.)
- Children: María Gertrudis, Mercedes, Trinidad and Luis González de Batres y García Granados
- Education: Pontifical University of San Carlos Borromeo
- Occupation: politician

Luis Batres Juarros or Luis Batres y Juarros (New Guatemala de la Asunción 7 May 1802 – 17 June 1862) was an influential conservative Guatemalan politician during the regime of General Rafael Carrera. Member of the Aycinena clan, was in charge of writing most of the legislation that was enacted during this period. The liberal historians portray him as a villain in a despotic and tyrannical government headed by illiterate Raca Carraca - Rafael Carrera - who was taking each and every one of Batres recommendations since he was considered infallible; However, research conducted between 1980 and 2010 has shown a more objective biography of both Batres and Rafael Carrera and show that it was in fact Carrera who had the reins of the Conservative government.

== Biography ==
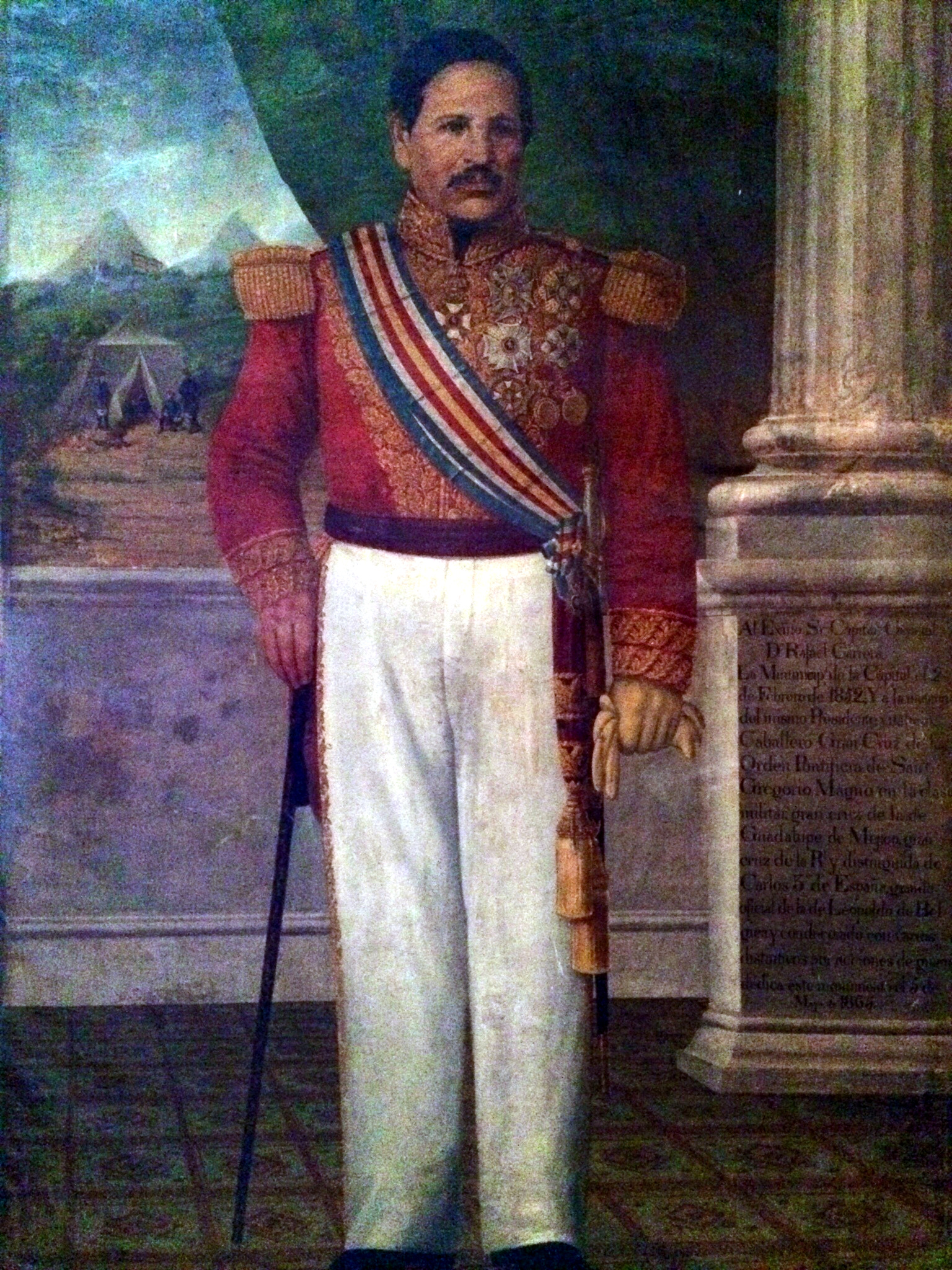
Captain General Rafael Carrera, president for life of Guatemala.

Batres Juarros was the son of José María González de Batres y Muñoz and María de las Mercedes Juarros Lacunza. He attended the Pontifical University of San Carlos Borromeo from which he graduated in 1823. He participated in the war against Francisco Morazán and his liberal forces under the command of the Governor of Guatemala, Mariano de Aycinena y Piñol with whom he was related. After Aycinena's defeat, he was banished by Morazan with another one hundred families belonging to the Aycinena clan, going into exile to Panama and then to the United States. He returned to Guatemala in 1839 when rebel general Rafael Carrera began to assert his authority in the state and managed to become one of his top aides and government ministers He even got his wife, Adelaida García Granados, to become a confidant and mentor to Carrera's wife, Petrona Alvarez

=== State of Los Altos ===
After the violent and bloody reinstatement of the State of Los Altos by Carrera in April 1840, Batres Juarros -then secretary general of the Guatemalan government of recently reinstated Mariano Rivera Paz- obtained from the vicar Larrazabal authorization to dismantle the regionalist Church. Acting priests of Quetzaltenango -capital of the would-be-state of Los Altos, priest Urban Ugarte and his coadjutor, priest José Maria Aguilar, were removed from their parish and likewise the priests of the parishes of San Martin Jilotepeque and San Lucas Tolimán. Larrazabal ordered the priests Fernando Antonio Dávila, Mariano Navarrete and Jose Ignacio Iturrioz to cover the parishes of Quetzaltenango, San Martin Jilotepeque and San Lucas Toliman, respectively.

== Bibliography ==
- Chandler, David L (1978). "The house of Aycinena". Revista de la Universidad de Costa Rica (in Spanish). San José, Costa Rica.
- González Davison, Fernando (2008). La montaña infinita;Carrera, caudillo de Guatemala (in Spanish). Guatemala: Artemis y Edinter. ISBN 978-84-89452-81-7.
- Hernández de León, Federico (1959). "El capítulo de las efemérides". Diario La Hora (in Spanish). Guatemala.
- Hernández de León, Federico (1930). El libro de las efemérides (in Spanish). Vol. Tomo III. Guatemala: Tipografía Sánchez y de Guise.
- López Vallecillos, Italo (1966). Gerardo Barrios y su tiempo (in Spanish). San Salvador, El Salvador: Dirección Nacional de Publicaciones del Ministerio de Educación.
- Martínez Peláez, Severo (1988). Racismo y Análisis Histórico de la Definición del Indio Guatemalteco (in Spanish). Guatemala: Editorial Universitaria.
- Martínez Peláez, Severo (1990). La patria del criollo; ensayo de interpretación de la realidad colonial guatemalteca (in Spanish). México: Ediciones en Marcha.
- Milla y Vidaurre, José (1980). Cuadros de Costumbres (in Spanish). Guatemala: Escolar Piedra Santa.
- Montúfar, Lorenzo; Salazar, Ramón A. (1892). El centenario del general Francisco Morazán (in Spanish). Guatemala: Tipografía Nacional.
- Rosa, Ramón (1974). Historia del Benemérito Gral. Don Francisco Morazán, ex Presidente de la República de Centroamérica (in Spanish). Honduras: Ministerio de Educación Pública, Ediciones Técnicas.
- Stephens, John Lloyd; Catherwood, Frederick (1854). Incidents of travel in Central America, Chiapas, and Yucatan. London, England: Arthur Hall, Virtue and Co.
- Taracena, Arturo (1999). Invención criolla, sueño ladino, pesadilla indigena, Los Altos de Guatemala: de región a Estado, 1740-1871 (in Spanish). Guatemala: CIRMA. Archived from the original on 2016-01-09.
- Weaver, Frederic S. (March 1999). "Reform and (Counter) Revolution in Post-Independence Guatemala: Liberalism, Conservatism, and Postmodern Controversies". Latin American Perspectives. 26 (2): 129–158. doi:10.1177/0094582X9902600207. S2CID 143757705.
- Woodward, Ralph Lee Jr. (2002). "Rafael Carrera y la creación de la República de Guatemala, 1821–1871". Serie monográfica (in Spanish) (12). CIRMA y Plumsock Mesoamerican Studies. ISBN 0-910443-19-X. Archived from the original on 2019-03-01.
- Woodward, Ralph Lee Jr. (1993). Rafael Carrera and the Emergence of the Republic of Guatemala, 1821-1871 (Online edition). Athens, Georgia EE.UU.: University of Georgia Press. ISBN 978-0-8203-4360-0.
