= Guatemalan Democratic Vanguard =

Leftist group in Guatemala that existed from 1947 to 1949

Guatemalan Democratic Vanguard Vanguardia Democrática Guatemalteca
- Abbreviation: VDG
- Leader: José Manuel Fortuny
- Founded: 28 September 1947
- Split from: PAR
- Merged into: PGT
- Ideology: Marxism
- National affiliation: PAR (until 1949)

Guatemalan Democratic Vanguard (Spanish: Vanguardia Democrática Guatemalteca) was a left-wing group in Guatemala. The VDG was founded on 28 September 1947 by a faction of the Revolutionary Action Party (PAR). The leader of the VDG was José Manuel Fortuny. The group had Marxist inspiration, and operated a semi-clandestine fashion. It supported urban and rural labour movements.

In 1949, the VDG broke with the PAR and constituted the Communist Party of Guatemala (PCG).
