= Van der Geest =

Van der Geest is a Dutch surname. Notable people with the surname include:

- Cornelis van der Geest (1577–1638), Flemish businessman
- Dennis van der Geest (born 1975), Dutch judoka
- Elco van der Geest (born 1979), Dutch-born Belgian judoka
- Jack van der Geest (1923–2009), Dutch concentration camp survivor
- Frank van der Geest (born 1973), Dutch association football and beach soccer goalkeeper
- Simon van der Geest (born 1978), Dutch writer and poet
