= Los Altos (state) =

State in Central America (1838–40, 1848–49)

State of Los Altos Estado de Los Altos (Spanish)
- 1838–1840; 1848–1849
- Flag Coat of arms
- Motto: "Dios, Unión, Libertad" (Spanish); English: "God, Union, Liberty"
- Anthem: "La Granadera"
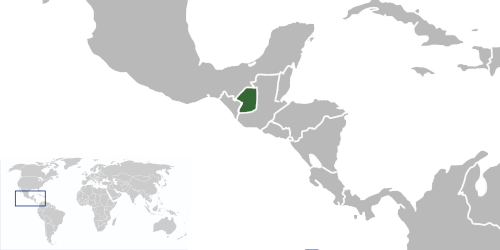
- Location of Los Altos
- Status: State of the Federal Republic of Central America (1838–40); Unrecognized breakaway state (1848–49)
- Capital: Quetzaltenango
- Common languages: Spanish
  - 1838–1840: Marcelo Molina
  - 1848: Fernando Antonio Dávila; José Velazco; Rafael de la Torre
- History
  - Independence from Guatemala: 2 February 1838
  - Renewed recognition of Central American Congress: 5 June 1838
  - Forcible reincorporation into Guatemala: January 1840
  - Renewed declaration of independence: 26 August 1848
  - Reincorporation into Guatemala: 8 May 1849

Area
  - Total: 23,800 km^{2} (9,200 sq mi)

Population
  - 1836 estimate: 200,000
- Currency: Central American Republic real
Preceded by	Succeeded by
Federal Republic of Central America	Guatemala; Centralist Republic of Mexico
- Today part of: Quetzaltenango; San Marcos; Huehuetenango; Totonicapán; Quiché; Sololá; Retalhuléu; Suchitepéquez; Soconusco (Mexico)

The State of Los Altos (Spanish: Estado de Los Altos), commonly known as Los Altos, was the 6th state of the Federal Republic of Central America from 1838 to 1840 and a short-lived independent republic from 1848 to 1849. Its capital was Quetzaltenango. Los Altos occupied eight departments in the west of present-day Guatemala as well as the Soconusco region in the Mexican state of Chiapas.

The state originated from the political differences and tensions between Guatemala City on one side, and Quetzaltenango and other parts of western Central America on the other. Debate about separation from Guatemala dated from shortly after Central American independence from Spain in 1821. Such a separate state was provided for by the Federal constitutional assembly of November 1824, but there was sizable opposition to the separation in Guatemala City.

As the liberal Federation crumbled into civil war due to the influence of the Guatemalan conservatives and the regular clergy, who had been expelled from Central America after Francisco Morazán's bloody invasion of Guatemala in 1829, Los Altos declared itself an independent republic.

The independence of Los Altos from Guatemala was officially proclaimed on 2 February 1838. The Federal government recognized Los Altos as the sixth state of the union and seated the representatives of Los Altos in the Federal Congress on 5 June of that year. The flag of Los Altos was a modification of that of the Central American Union, with a central seal showing a volcano in the background with a quetzal (a local bird symbolizing liberty) in front. This was the first Central American flag to use the quetzal as a symbol; since 1871, it has been on the present flag of Guatemala.

== Administrative divisions ==
Los Altos consisted of three administrative regions:

- Totonicapán (the modern Guatemalan departments of Totonicapán, Huehuetenango)
- Quetzaltenango (the modern departments of Quetzaltenango and San Marcos)
- Suchitepéquez-Sololá (the modern departments of Retalhuleu, Suchitepéquez, Sololá, and Quiché)

== First period of separation ==
=== First invasion of Rafael Carrera ===
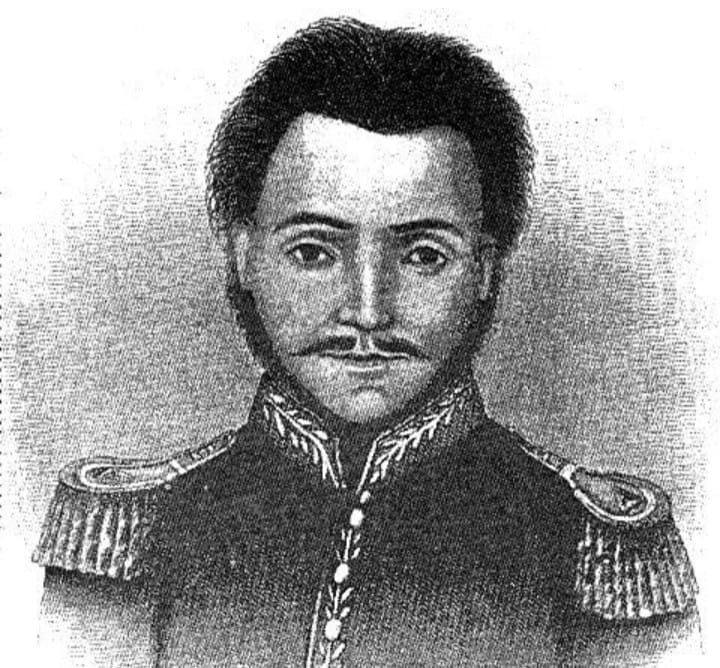
General Agustín Guzmán

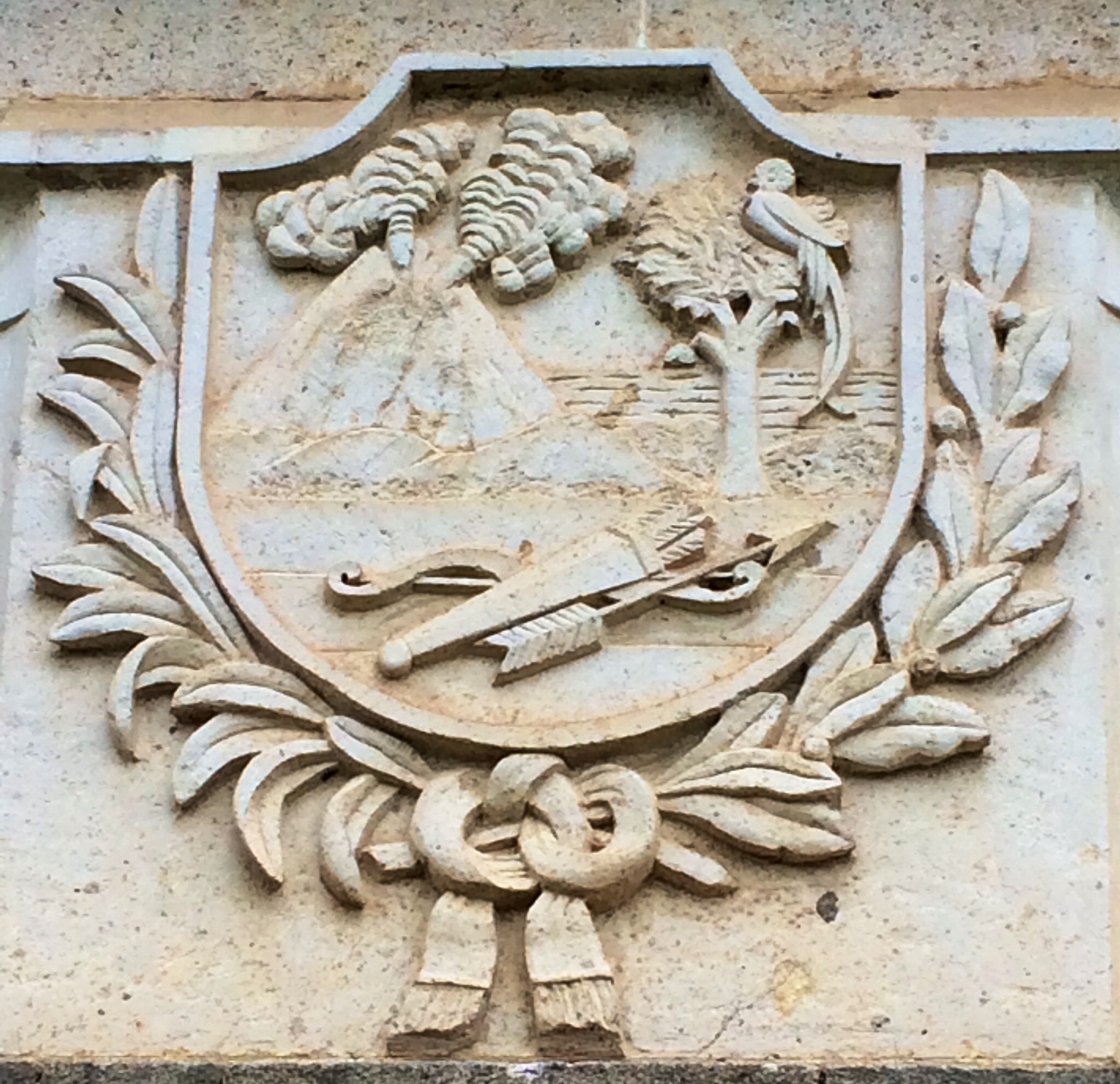
The Coat of Arms of Los Altos, carved in stone on the grave of heroes in the Cemetery of Quetzaltenango.

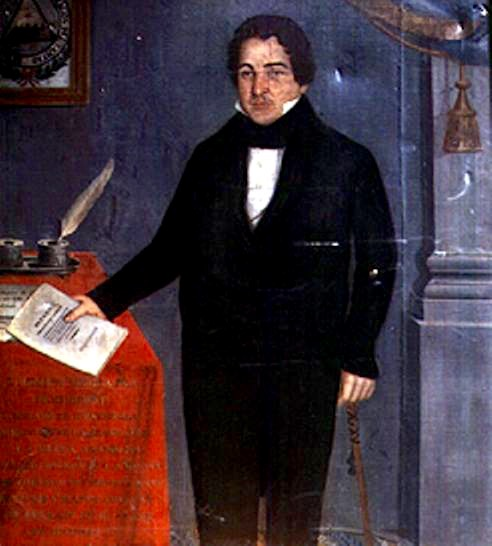
Mariano Rivera Paz. Conservative Chief of State of Guatemala during the time Los Altos was established and then recovered for Guatemala by Rafael Carrera.

On April 2, 1838, in the city of Quetzaltenango, a secessionist group founded the independent State of Los Altos, which sought independence from Guatemala. The most important members of the Liberal Party of Guatemala and liberal enemies of the conservative regime moved to Los Altos, rather than needing to emigrate to El Salvador to live in a pro-liberal state.

The liberals in Los Altos began a harsh criticism of the Conservative government of Rivera Paz; they even had their own newspaper – El Popular, which contributed to the harsh criticism.

However, Los Altos was the most productive region with most economic activity of the former State of Guatemala; without Los Altos, conservatives lost many benefits that held the hegemony of the State of Guatemala in Central America.

The government of Guatemala tried to reach a peaceful solution, but "altenses", (Note: Altenses is how people from Quetzaltenango are known in Guatemala.) protected by the recognition by the Congress of the Central American Federation, did not accept this. Guatemala's government then resorted to force, sending the commanding general of the army, Rafael Carrera, to subdue Los Altos.

Carrera defeated General Agustín Guzmán when the former Mexican officer tried to ambush him and then went on to Quetzaltenango, where he imposed a harsh and hostile conservative regime for liberals. Calling all council members, he told them flatly that he was behaving kindly to them because it was the first time they had challenged him, but sternly warned them that there would be no mercy if there were to be a second time. General Guzmán and the head of state of Los Altos, Marcelo Molina, were sent to the capital of Guatemala, where they were displayed as trophies of war during a triumphant parade on February 17, 1840. Guzmán was shackled, wounds still bleeding, and riding a mule.

=== Second invasion of Rafael Carrera ===
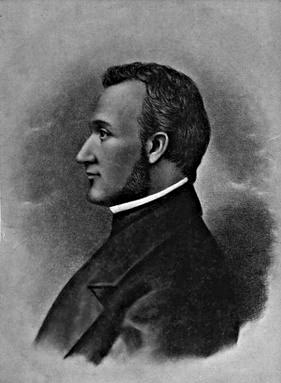
General Francisco Morazán tried to invade Guatemala for the second time in 1840 after having invaded in 1829 and expelled members of the Aycinena clan and regular orders. In 1840 he was defeated by Carrera overwhelmingly, marking the end of his career in Central America

On March 18, 1840, liberal caudillo Francisco Morazán invaded Guatemala with 1500 soldiers to avenge the insult done in Los Altos and fearing that such action would end liberal efforts to hold together the Central American Federation. Guatemala had a cordon of guards from the border with El Salvador; without telegraph service, men ran carrying last minute messages. With the information from these messengers, Carrera hatched a plan of defense leaving his brother Sotero with troops who presented a slight resistance in the city.

Carrera pretended to flee and led the ragtag army to the heights of Aceituno as only had about four men and the same number of loads rifle, plus two old cannons. The city was at the mercy of the army of Morazán, with bells of their twenty churches ringing for divine assistance. Once Morazán reached the capital, he took it easily and freed Guzman, who immediately left for Quetzaltenango to give the news that Carrera was defeated.

Carrera then took advantage of what his enemies believed and applied a strategy of concentrating fire on the Central Park of the city. His surprise attack tactics caused heavy casualties to the army of Morazán and forced the survivors to fight for their lives. (Note: The famous Guatemalan poet José Batres Montúfar participated in these battles) In combat, Morazán's soldiers lost the initiative and their numerical superiority. Furthermore, unaware of their surroundings in the city, Morazan's troops had to fight, carry their dead and care for their wounded while still tired by the long march from El Salvador to Guatemala.

Carrera, by then an experienced military man (Note: Carrera even had suffered two previous defeats at the hands of Morazán.) was able to stand up and defeat Morazán thoroughly. The disaster for the liberal general was complete: aided by Angel Molina (Note: Angel Molina was the son of Guatemalan Liberal leader Pedro Molina Mazariegos.) who knew the streets of the city, he had to flee with his favorite men, disguised and shouting "Long live Carrera!" through the ravine of El Incienso to El Salvador, to save his life.

In his absence Morazán had been relieved as head of state of that country, and he had to embark for exile in Peru. In Guatemala, survivors from his troops were shot without mercy, as Carrera pursued Morazan, whom he failed to catch. This lance definitely sealed the status of General Carrera and marked the decline of Morazán, and forced the conservative Clan Aycinena criollos to negotiate with Carrera and his revolutionary peasant supporters.

Agustin Guzmán, freed by Morazán when the latter had seemingly defeated Carrera in Guatemala City, had gone back to Quetzaltenango with the good news. The city's liberal criollo leaders rapidly reinstated the Los Altos State and celebrated Morazán's victory. However, as soon as Carrera and the newly reinstated Mariano Rivera Paz heard the news, Carrera went back to Quetzaltenango with his volunteer army to regain control of the rebel liberal state once and for all.

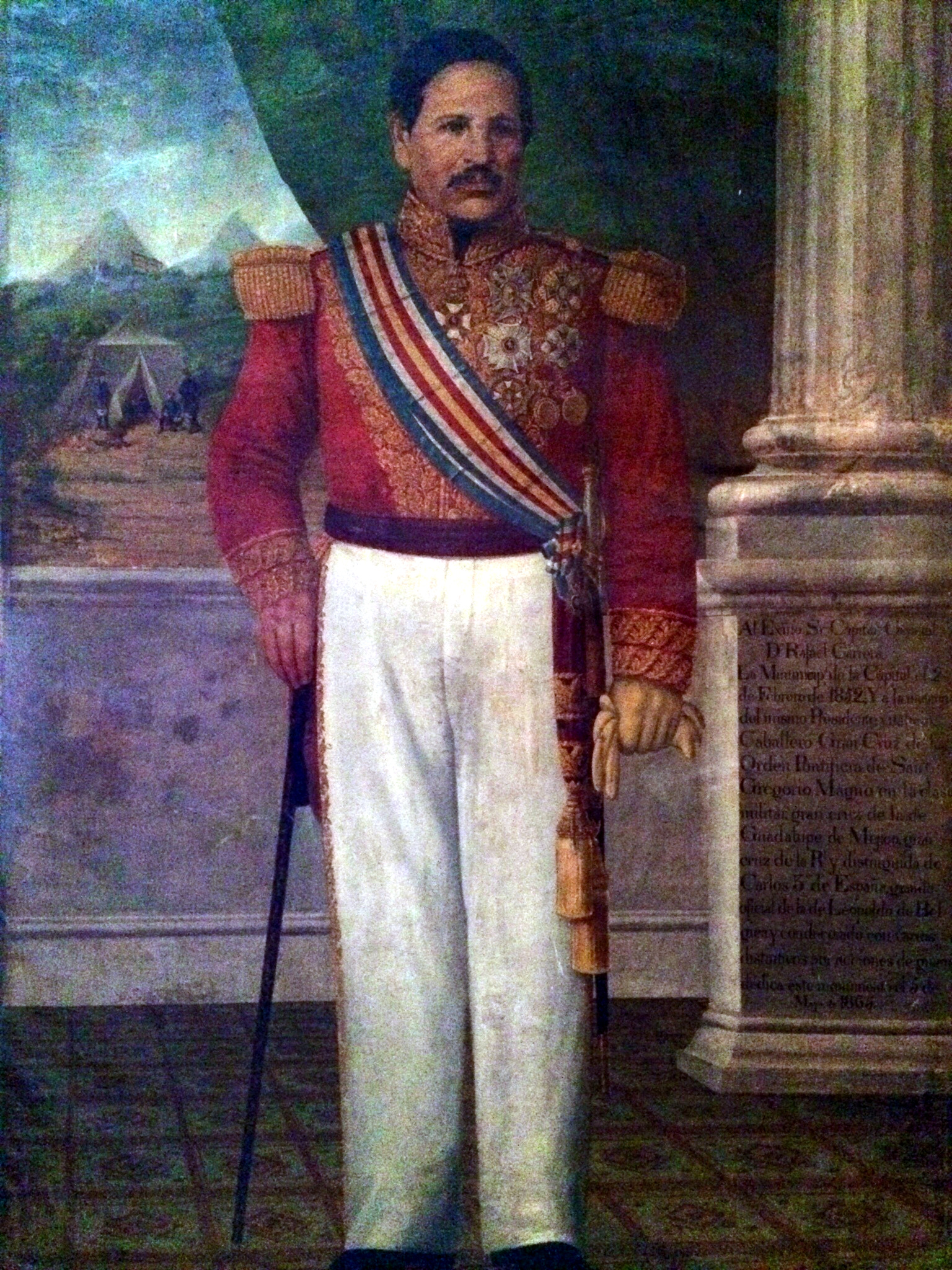
Captain General Rafael Carrera after being appointed President for Life of the Republic of Guatemala in 1854.

On 2 April 1840, after entering the city, Carrera told the citizens that he had already warned them after he defeated them earlier that year. Then he ordered most of the liberal city hall officials from Los Altos shot. Carrera, then forcibly annexed Quetzaltenango and much of Los Altos back into conservative Guatemala.

After the violent and bloody reinstatement of the State of Los Altos by Carrera in April 1840, Luis Batres Juarros — conservative member of the Aycinena Clan, then secretary general of the Guatemalan government of recently reinstated Mariano Rivera Paz — obtained from the vicar Larrazabal authorization to dismantle the regionalist Church.

Active priests of Quetzaltenango — capital of the would-be-state of Los Altos — Urban Ugarte and José Maria Aguilar, were removed from their parish and likewise the priests of the parishes of San Martin Jilotepeque and San Lucas Tolimán. Larrazabal ordered the priests Fernando Antonio Dávila, Mariano Navarrete and Jose Ignacio Iturrioz to cover the parishes of Quetzaltenango, San Martin Jilotepeque and San Lucas Toliman, respectively.

The defeat of the liberal criollos in Quetzaltenango reinforced Carrera allies' status within the native population of the area, whom he respected and protected as the leader of the peasant revolution.

Taking advantage of the chaos and unsettled situation, the Soconusco region was annexed by Mexico.

In 1844, 1848, and 1849, unsuccessful revolts against the dictatorship of Rafael Carrera briefly reproclaimed the independence of Los Altos.

== Second period of separation ==
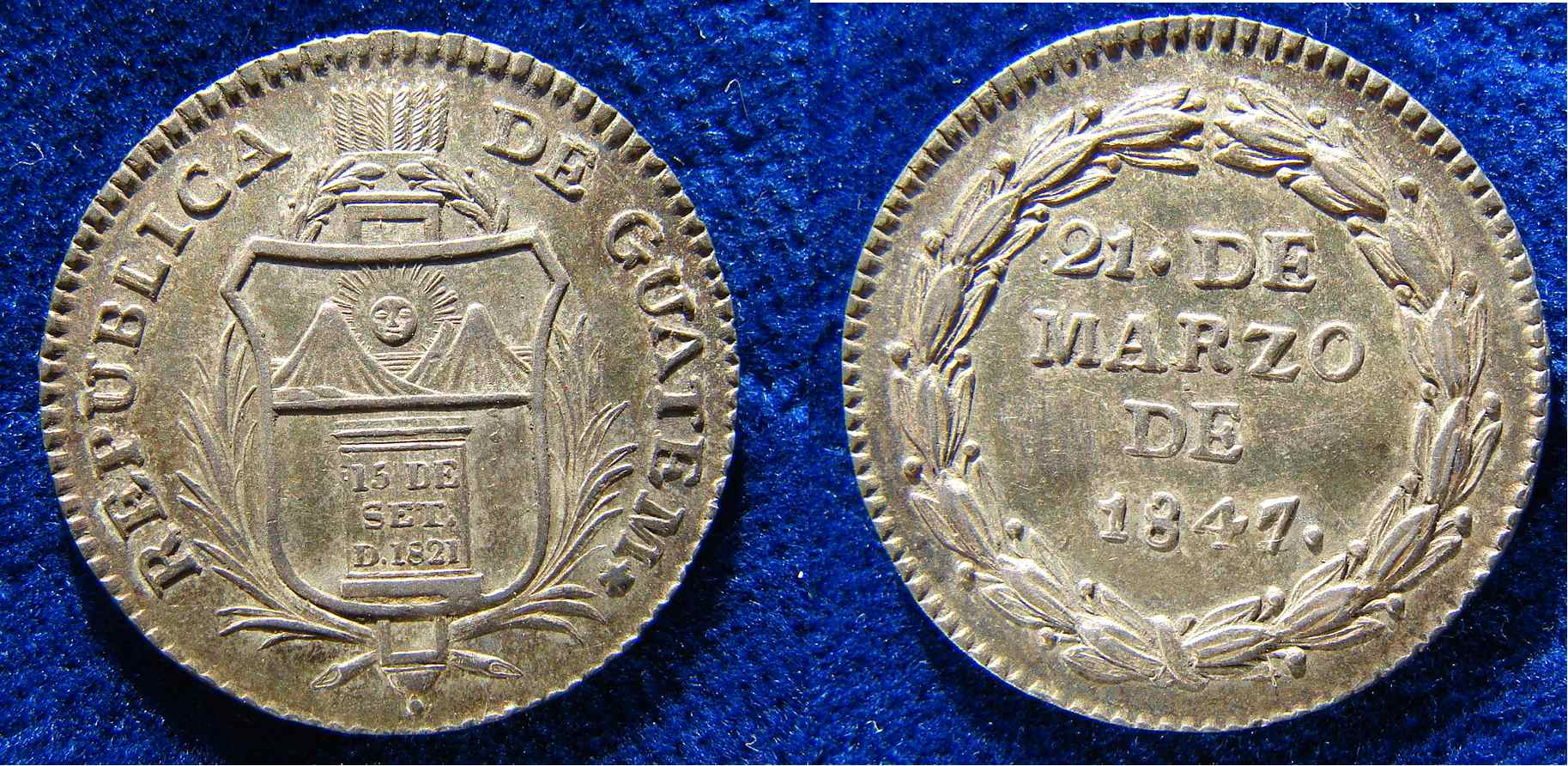
Proclamation Coin 1847 of the independent Republic of Guatemala

Guatemala became a sovereign and independent republic on 21 March 1847. By 1848, the situation in Guatemala was chaotic: Serapio Cruz was attacking Quiché region, inciting revolts against the government; there were riots in the eastern part of the country; liberals and conservatives were in constant conflict. The liberals were able to force Carrera to resign on 17 August 1848 and into exile.

On Carrera's absence, the Quetzaltenango capitulars – led by general Agustín Guzmán, who occupied the city after Corregidor General Mariano Paredes was called to Guatemala City to take over the presidential office – declared that Los Altos was an independent state once again on 26 August 1848. The new state had the support of the government of El Salvador led by President Doroteo Vasconcelos and the rebel guerrilla army of Vicente and Cruz who were declared enemies of general Carrera. On 5 September, the criollos altenses chose a formal government led by Fernando Antonio Martínez.

The existence of Los Altos lasted until 8 May 1849; when Guzmán went to meet with representatives of President Paredes in Antigua Guatemala, Carrera took the opportunity to take Quetzaltenango and remained in the plaza. By then, Carrera already had the military support of the Corregidor of Suchitepéquez, José Víctor Zavala, whom the Paredes government had appointed to arrest Carrera; however, instead of arresting Carrera, Zavala placed himself at Carrera's command.

Paredes heard the news, and the indigenous groups' massive support for Carrera. After discussion with liberals and conservatives, Paredes decided to revoke the death penalty on Carrera on the advice of the conservative Luis Batres Juarros, who made him see that fighting Carrera would open a front in the west of the country. Moreover, Paredes appointed Carrera as the Commander General of Arms, with authorization to pacify of the rebels in the east of the country, and to direct military operations in the manner he deemed appropriate. Faced with this decree, the main liberal leaders fled to El Salvador, where President Vasconcelos gave them asylum. (Note: Among the liberals who fled were José Francisco Barrundia and Lorenzo Montúfar. Pedro Molina remained in Guatemala, too old to undertake such a journey.)

To avoid capture, Guzmán left Guatemala with his commanders and officers on 1 June 1849, while the rest of his troops were left to their fate. He finally fled to El Salvador on 10 June, received by Vasconcelos. After a while, Guzmán issued a note to the rest of the liberal leaders in Central America, in which he attacked the immorality and viciousness of the savage Carrera. According to Guzman, Carrera had not governed Guatemala properly in the last nine years. In his note, Guzman said that he had gone to El Salvador to retire from public life, but that he could not remain impassive in the face of the events occurring in Guatemala. With the help of El Salvador, Honduras, Nicaragua, and the "reborn Los Altos", he was going to fight against Carrera's return. He practically assured that he was Morazán's successor, trying to get rid of Carrera, but his note did not gather any support. Finally, Carrera triumphantly entered Guatemala City on 8 August 1849.

In October 1849, Guzmán entered Guatemalan territory one last time with his new ally, Agustín Reyes. They were chased by Carrera and his forces on the eastern part of the country, but played their strategy well and were able to go directly to Guatemala City, leaving the Guatemalan Army still looking for them in the East. Guatemala City had a small garrison of 100 men, in charge of colonel Ignacio Garcia Granados, who learned about the rebel attack when two spies arrived telling him that the enemy was already in Chinautla, only 3 leagues away from the city. Guzmán and Reyes entered the city after defeating Garcia Granados in El Cerro del Carmen and went directly to Carrera's house where Guzmán threw torches knowing that Carrera's family was inside; (Note: Petrona and her children were able to escape unharmed and were taken in by the archbishop.) after that, they went to the Government Palace in Plaza de Armas, but there they were attacked by heavy artillery and Guzmán was badly injured. He died that night, at the outskirt of Guatemala city while his forces were fleeing.

== See also ==
- History of Guatemala
- Luis Batres Juarros
- Rafael Carrera

== Bibliography ==
- González Davison, Fernando (2008). La montaña infinita; Carrera, caudillo de Guatemala (in Spanish). Guatemala: Artemis y Edinter. ISBN 978-84-89452-81-7.
- Hall, C.; Brignoli, H.P.; Cotter, J.V. (2003). Historical Atlas of Central America. Oklahoma: University of Oklahoma Press.
- Hernández de León, Federico (1959). "El capítulo de las efemérides: José Milla y Rafael Carrera". Diario La Hora (in Spanish). Guatemala.
- Hernández de León, Federico (1930). El libro de las efemérides (in Spanish). Vol. Tomo III. Guatemala: Tipografía Sánchez y de Guise.
- Montúfar, Lorenzo; Montúfar, Rafael (1898). Memorias autobiográficas de Lorenzo Montúfar. Guatemala.
- Marroquín Rojas, Clemente (1971). Francisco Morazán y Rafael Carrera (in Spanish). Guatemala: Piedrasanta.
- Miceli, Keith (1974). "Rafael Carrera: Defender and Promoter of Peasant Interests in Guatemala, 1837–1848". The Americas. 31 (1). Academy of American Franciscan History: 72–95. doi:10.1017/S000316150008843X. JSTOR 980382. S2CID 197669388.
- Taracena, Arturo (1999). Invención criolla, sueño ladino, pesadilla indigena, Los Altos de Guatemala: de región a Estado, 1740-1871 (in Spanish). Guatemala: CIRMA. Archived from the original on 2016-01-09.
- Woodward, Ralph (1993). Rafael Carrera and the emergence of the Republic of Guatemala, 1821-1871. University of Georgia Press.
