= Flag of Los Altos =

Los Altos
- Use: National flag and ensign
- Proportion: 3:5
- Adopted: 1838
- Relinquished: 1849

The flag of Los Altos was a modification of the flag of the Federal Republic of Central America, with a central seal showing a volcano (possibly Santa Maria or Almolonga) in the background with a quetzal (a local bird symbolizing liberty) in front. Los Altos ("The Highlands" in the Spanish language) was a state in the Federal Republic of Central America in the 1830s. Its capital was Quetzaltenango and it occupied the west of present-day Guatemala and parts of the Mexican state of Chiapas. This was the first Central American flag to use the quetzal as a symbol; since 1871, it has been on the present flag of Guatemala.

== See also ==
- Flag of Lethbridge
- Flag of Pocatello, Idaho
- Flag of Yugoslavia
