= Guatemalan National Revolutionary Unity =

Guatemalan National Revolutionary Unity Unidad Revolucionaria Nacional Guatemalteca
- Abbreviation: URNG-MAIZ
- General Secretary: Carlos Barrios
- Founded: 8 February 1982
- Legalised: 18 December 1998
- Merger of: EGP; FAR; ORPA; PGT; PGT-NDN
- Headquarters: Guatemala City
- Membership (2024): ▲25,633
- Ideology: Socialism; Left-wing nationalism; Indigenismo; Christian socialism; Socialism of the 21st century; Anti-capitalism; Historical: Chavismo; Marxism–Leninism
- Political position: Far-left
- Regional affiliation: São Paulo Forum
- Colors: Red, Green, Yellow (logo); Blue, White (flag)
- Congress: 0 / 160

Party flag

The Guatemalan National Revolutionary Unity (Spanish: Unidad Revolucionaria Nacional Guatemalteca, URNG-MAIZ or most commonly URNG) is a Guatemalan political party that started as a guerrilla movement in 1982. The party laid down its arms in 1996 and became a legal political party in 1998, after the peace process which ended the Guatemalan Civil War.

== History ==
=== Background ===
==== PBSUCCESS and early insurgency ====
Since the CIA-backed coup in 1954, opposition groups were continuously forming in an attempt to fight against the repression that the military and wealthy landowners in Guatemala had created. The ensuing military dictatorship of Carlos Castillo Armas immediately on 28 June 1954 banned the Guatemalan Party of Labour (PGT) and shortly later other labor unions and left-wing parties with suspected communist sympathies via Decree 4880. After the assassination of Castillo Armas by a left-wing member of the presidential guard, Miguel Ydígoras Fuentes prevailed in the ensuing power struggle. The continued repression, coupled with an ever closer alignment of the Guatemalan government with the United States government, as well as rampant corruption and favoritism led to a rebellion by a group of dissident officers, which later named themselves Revolutionary Movement 13th November (MR-13), in reference to the incident. The failed coup d'état on 13 November 1960 usually marks the beginning of the Guatemalan Civil War, a bloody affair that lasted 36 years and claimed the lives of an estimated 200,000 people. With United States military assistance, the guerrilla were uprooted from eastern Guatemala and had to flee to neighboring Honduras. Remnants of the MR-13 returned in 1962 and established the first guerrilla group, the Rebel Armed Forces (FAR). After barely any preparation the FAR launched its first attacks against remote military installations and properties of the United Fruit Company on 6 February 1962. The failure of the Bay of Pigs Invasion in April 1961 and his purported erratic behavior convinced part of the military and the United States to rid themselves of Ydígoras Fuentes, which finally succeeded after several attempts in March 1963. This putsch, led by his Minister of Defense Alfredo Enrique Peralta Azurdia, denoted the beginning of Guatemala's first authentic military regime. In 1966, the law professor Julio César Méndez Montenegro was elected to the presidency, but was only allowed to take up the position under the condition, that he would not interfere in matters of internal security or the military. The year also saw the creation of Mano Blanca, a right-wing paramilitary group associated with the MLN, founded to prohibit Méndez Montenegro from taking office and to counter left-wing activism. The subsequent "white terror" coupled with the Zacapa program, severely crippled the guerrilla force based in eastern Guatemala, which in turn tried to avoid detection by hiding in cities. The FAR responded by resorting to various assassinations and abductions during the late 1960s to early 1970s, like those of John Gordon Mein and Karl von Spreti. The tense security situation led both right-wing military factions, namely the MLN and PID to unify for the elections in 1970, to counter the reforms initiated under Méndez Montenegro, which the army perceived as infringing on their autonomy. The incoming government of Carlos Manuel Arana Osorio initiated another counterinsurgency to stifle the FAR and began to entrench the military in the Guatemalan economy, chiefly by establishing the Army Bank, which handed out loans to the officer corps.

==== FAR splinters and government pressure ====
As a consequence of the repression, a large contingent of the FAR came to the conclusion that they needed to change their strategy. Instead of continuing with the foco strategy of confronting the army in the countryside, which inflicted heavy losses on them, they saw the need to expand their social base to indigenous communities and middle class intellectuals and professionals. This perception gave rise to the Organization of People in Arms (ORPA) and Guerrilla Army of the Poor (EGP) in the early 1970s. The former was formed in 1971 as the Organización Regional de Occidente, as a branch of the FAR in western Guatemala, before splitting outright in mid 1972. The split was effectuated by their differences regarding organizational and ideological questions, particularly the role of ethnicity in the economic exclusion of indigenous people. The group underwent a gestation period of 8 years, operating clandestinely, mainly recruiting soldiers and accruing arms, before committing their first operation in September 1979. The group would soon grow famous for acts of armed propaganda in this mold, wherein they disarmed the local police and military forces and read out revolutionary statements, while handing out propaganda leaflets. Similarly the Guerrilla Army of the Poor was established in 1972, as a splinter of the FAR, caused by ideological and tactical differences akin to ORPA, in that they saw the greatest revolutionary potential in indigenous people. This group was heavily influenced by liberation theology and build a large indigenous and Ladino following in El Quiché. In the midst of this situation the MLN-PID alliance broke down and the protégé of Arana Osorio, Fernando Romeo Lucas García of the PID was elected to the presidency. Lucas García tried to solidify his hold on power by integrating the Mano Blanca into the regular military, while establishing the Ejercito Secreto Anti-Comunista, a paramilitary group beholden to himself. This group committed various human rights abuses, among them torture, public threats to prominent political adversaries and massacres, like the infamous Panzós massacre. In response to these massacres, sections of the FAR and a PGT splinter group also rejoined the armed struggle by the late 1970s, creating a volatile atmosphere in Guatemala.

==== Guerrilla offensive and pre-unification measures ====
The repression of the late 1970s failed to quell the rebellion and likely had the unintentional consequence of growing the ranks of the guerrilla factions between 1980 and 1981, who by that time were in charge of 9 departments in Guatemala. Another pivotal incident was the Spanish Embassy Fire in January 1980, in which the Guatemalan military firebombed the embassy to evict a protest group of indigenous peasant farmers and student activist inside the embassy, which also backfired at the military, leading to even more momentum for the guerrilla mobilization effort. By early 1981, the guerrilla forces were so strong that they mounted a major offensive on government forces, leaving rural areas in the West and South firmly in their hands and enabling them to mount occasional assaults in the capital. The military responded with a widespread counter-insurgency campaign, linked with a divide and conquer strategy, by organizing the recruitment of indigenous people into, so-called "self-defense patrols" (Patrullas de Autodefensa Civil (PAC)), to control their communities. The increasing oppression brought the divided groups back together, which had in 1978 already established a Tripartite cooperation agreement between EGP, FAR and PGT-ND. Geopolitical circumstances at the end of 1980 led the Cuban and Nicaraguan government, which supported the guerrilla, to ultimately press for a more thorough merger.

=== Formation ===
In the backdrop of these civil war circumstances the URNG formed as a leftist umbrella organization consisting of four groups: the Guerrilla Army of the Poor (EGP), the Revolutionary Organization of People in Arms (ORPA), the Rebel Armed Forces (FAR) and the National Directing Nucleus of PGT (PGT-NDN) on 8 February 1982. The unification process was mediated by the Cuban government, who only wanted to support a unitary and forceful insurgency. In consequence, the group became the public face of the long-running insurgency against the Guatemalan government throughout the Guatemalan Civil War.

Later on, the URNG led the leftist opposition in peace negotiations with the conservative Guatemalan government. These negotiations began in 1986 and brought the end of the civil war when negotiations finished in December 1996, by signing the Firm and Lasting Agreement. The conclusion of the peace talks led the URNG to pursue the registration as a legal party inside the Guatemalan political system in June 1997. The group was formally registered as a political party in December 1998.

=== Civil war era ===
==== Military regimes and suppression of the guerrilla ====
In March 1982, only one month after their formation, the URNG experienced an attack ordered by then president, retired General Efraín Ríos Montt. Backed by the CIA, Ríos Montt led a "scorched-earth" counter-insurgency campaign against the URNG and its supporters until he was toppled the following year. During his rule, Rios Montt tried to eradicate the insurgency by banning the activities of political parties and committing various massacres against the population in the Guatemalan highlands, thereby removing the recruitment pool of the URNG. He and his associates ascribed critique on their measures to an "international communist conspiracy" of which Amnesty International and the Catholic Church were also a part of. Ríos Montt's eventual downfall from power followed a similar path as his ascension, with a coup by his Minister of Defence Óscar Humberto Mejía Víctores in August 1983. His overthrow ended the bloodiest episode of the civil war and the Guatemalan genocide, in which approximately 150,000 civilians were killed between mid 1981 and 1983 and which led to widespread displacement of another 1.5 million people. The Victoria 82 campaign, as it was called by Ríos Montt, proved to be highly successful against the guerrilla though, which had to retreat to remote rural zones, while its leadership fled to Mexico City. It also hampered the merging process of the divergent groups considerably, as streamlined and unified logistics could only be arranged by 1986. Additionally devastating for the guerrilla was the renewed support from the USA to the Guatemalan military upon the Reagan administration taking office in January 1981.

The militant PGT splinter groups saw their base wiped-out, following the capture and coerced conversion of Carlos Quinteros, an important commander in their ranks. The political wing of the PGT also faced a major crisis, after unsuccessfully trying to reorganize itself in its former northern strongholds of Alta Verapaz, as this plan was thwarted by the military. The social disarticulation and continuous assassinations of its members eventually led to its exhaustion by 1986, which prompted them to mend their relationship with the URNG. These events led the URNG to eventually substitute the PGT-NDN for the PGT in its leadership by 1987.

The URNG employed ambushes and raids on government security forces as their main tactic, and also performed bombings and assassinations. They attacked the military, government officials, as well as foreign diplomats and foreign businesses. The government responded with undercover death-squads, supported by the police and military, who undertook the mission to take down prominent leftists.

==== Return to civilian rule ====
After the election of Vinicio Cerezo in 1985, the truncated civil society in Guatemala revitalized to some degree, which convinced a significant part of mid-level cadres to abandon armed struggle, subsequently reducing the organisations leverage during the peace negotiations. Already during his election campaign, Vinicio Cerezo emphasized national unity, which he combined with critique of the armies conduct and expressed willingness to negotiate with the URNG. Still his presidency achieved very little to rein in on political violence and he made only token efforts to prosecute human rights abuses committed by the army. According to the FAR commander Pablo Monsanto, the guerilla entered the first negotiations with the Cerezo administration to reorganize and rearm itself and only later reached a point, where a political solution to the conflict seemed beneficial and unavoidable. By the time a civilian government returned to office in 1986, the URNG recognized that coming to power through armed struggle was out of the question, and they took initiatives to negotiate a political solution.

According to a report in NACLA's Report on the Americas (May/June 1997),

The government and army maintained that since they had "defeated" the URNG, they had no need to negotiate until the guerrillas had laid down their arms. The subsequent settlements ending the wars in Nicaragua and El Salvador stiffened the elites' resolve "never" to permit such an outcome in Guatemala.

The URNG functioned as an umbrella organization to represent the leftist beliefs amongst the Guatemalan people, particularly the Guatemalan poor. Although they were involved in attacks, their primary function was at the negotiation table with the Guatemalan government.

=== Peace process ===
From 1986 to 1996, the army and government were drawn into a peace process moderated and verified by the United Nations and including other international actors as key players. During the negotiations both sides made major concessions. The UN mediated Oslo Agreement provided an arrangement for direct negotiation between the belligerent groups. This open negotiation led to the signing of the "Agreement on Procedures in Search of Peace by Political Means" in Mexico in 1991. The United Nations presided over these changes meant to create a long-lasting peace. Obligations were imposed on the government, including significant constitutional reforms, which were internationally binding and would be verified by the UN. After 9 years of negotiations in 1995, the leadership of the URNG came to a preliminary agreement with the government to sign a peace deal in 1996.

=== Peace accord and legal opposition party ===
On 29 December 1996, a peace agreement was signed by the government and the URNG in the presence of UN Secretary-General Boutros Boutros-Ghali, officially ending the 36-year civil war. The signing ceremony was held in front of the National Palace of Culture on the Plaza de la Constición in the presence of about 50,000 people. Among a cheerful crowd, a flame of peace was lit by the signatories inmidst the place to symbolize the end of armed conflict. The Secretary-General of the URNG, Comandante Rolando Morán and president Álvaro Arzú jointly received the UNESCO Peace Prize for their efforts to end the civil war and attain the peace agreement.

The UNRG has since apologized for the atrocities that occurred during the Guatemalan Civil War, asking forgiveness from all victims, families and other who experienced any kind of excesses. This apology came two days after President Clinton admitted the role of the United States in a "dark and painful period" during the civil war in Guatemala. After Rolando Moran died in September 1998, Pablo Monsanto (nom de guerre Jorge Soto) was elected to succeed him as Secretary General of the party. In May 1999, as a provision of the peace agreement, a constitutional referendum was held to amend the constitution. The URNG was part of the Front for Yes, advocating for an affirmative vote during the election campaign. All 4 provisions failed to win a majority, albeit amid a low voter turnout of 18.5%.

The party made its national electoral debut during the elections in 1999, joining forces with 2 minor left-wing parties, the Authentic Integral Development and Unidad de la Izquierda Democrática to contest the elections as the New Nation Alliance. The alliance, which was finalized on 12 February 1999, nominated the moderate Álvaro Colom, who in 2011 eventually was successful in seeking the presidential office inside the National Unity of Hope, as their presidential candidate. He came in third with about 12.4% of the vote. The alliance also achieved the third place in the legislative election with 11% of the national vote, thereby electing 9 Congress members. The party drew significant support from part of their former strongholds and majority indigenous departments Huehuetenango, Quetzaltenango and El Quiché, where in each the alliance was able to win an electoral district seat.

In August 2001, with the support of Rodrigo Asturias (nom de guerre Gaspar Ilom)), Alba Estela Maldonado Guevara (nom de guerre Capitán Lola) was elected to replace Soto as Secretary General and subsequently developed a cosier relationship with the ruling FRG, which was founded by its former archenemy Rios Montt. The new party line was met with significant opposition from within the party, leading first to the resignation of Arnoldo Noriega, a former leader inside the EGP and critique from Soto, who rejected cooperation with the FRG. Later in May 2002, Soto also left the party to found the New Nation Alternative, taking fewer than 200 members with him.

In the legislative election, held on 9 November 2003, the severely fractured party saw their vote share decrease to 4.2% of the popular vote, returning 2 out of 158 seats to Congress. Elected were Maldonado Guevara via the party list and Viktor Manuel Sales for a seat in the Huehuetenango delegation. In the presidential election held the same day, its candidate Rodrigo Asturias won 2.6% of the popular vote.

After the elections party leaders cited, among other factors, their lack of knowledge about the political system and electoral campaigning as reasons for their limited electoral success. After Rodrigo Asturias died in June 2005, Héctor Nuila was selected to succeed him as Secretary General. In the preparation phase for the next election, Movimiento Amplio de Izquierdas (MAIZ) was founded as a leftist platform, representing various leftist organizations.

At the 2007 elections the party captured 2 seats, one in Huehuetenango and one via the national list, with 3.7% of the nationwide vote in the congressional elections. In the presidential election of the same day, its candidate Miguel Ángel Sandoval won 2.1% of the popular vote.

For the elections in 2011 the party entered into a political alliance with Winaq, MNR, the URNG splinter ANN and 60 civil society groups to form the Broad Front of the Left. Broadly seen as a positive development inside the left, the coalition only yielded limited electoral success, returning only two seats, one each for San Marcos and Huehuetenango, to the legislature with approximately 3.3% in the congressional elections and 3.2% for the presidential candidate and Winaq founder Rigoberta Menchú.

At the national party convention in March 2013, a new executive committee was elected, including Ángel Sánchez as the successor of Héctor Nuila as new General Secretary.

The coalition was maintained for the 2015 elections and was able to increase their vote share to almost 4.4%, but the party only maintained their single legislator in Congress via winning a congressional district. In the presidential elections the Broad Front of the Left unified behind the presidential candidacy of Miguel Ángel Sandoval, who received about 2.1% of the vote.

In January 2019, the possibility of a united list with the successor party of the ANN, Convergence was explored. In May 2019, in the run-up to the next elections, the party was one of 5 left leaning parties that declined to participate in a conference hosted by the Asociación la Familia Importa for a conservative pact concerning the "defense of family and life".

The coalition split up ahead of the elections in 2019, but the party was nonetheless able to reach 2.8% among the national electorate and even increased their number of elected deputies to 3. Before the start of the election campaign, the party committee held talks with Thelma Aldana, founder of Semilla, to discuss the possible support of her candidacy, but as she was barred from participating in the election by the Constitutional Court due to questionable accusations of corruption, the party ultimately nominated Pablo Ceto and Blanca Estela Colop. Ceto, who had already been a vice presidential candidate for the party in 2003, campaigned on a reinvigorated peace process as well as the eradication of poverty and roughly maintained their last result with 2.2% of the vote.

The party by and large opposed the government of Alejandro Giammattei after the election and particularly opposed the dismissal of Juan Francisco Sandoval as head prosecutor of the Special Prosecutor's Office against Impunity in July 2021. In January 2022, Miguel Ángel Sandoval, the former presidential candidate for the party or alliance in 2007 and 2015, wrote an open letter to party leadership of his own party, the Movement for the Liberation of Peoples, Semilla and Winaq, calling for a fresh political and electoral alliance. He cited the Historic Pact for Colombia and the Brazil of Hope coalitions as successful role models for cross ideological alliances. On 29 January 2023, URNG and Winaq made their renewed alliance public and announced their plans to nominate Amílcar Pop and Mónica Enríquez as their presidential ticket for the upcoming elections. Moreover, the parties aimed to cooperate with Semilla to win the mayorship of Guatemala City, which ultimately came to fruition when the coalition nominated Juan Francisco Solórzano Foppa, the former director of the Superintendency of the Tax Administration (SAT), for the position.

== Support base ==
During the civil war the group received support from Guatemala's rural poor as well as from urban intellectuals. The URNG enjoyed high support among indigenous communities, which was reflected in the fact that 82% of its demobilized armed combatants and 50% of its political activists came from an indigenous background. After the conclusion of peace negotiations, the URNG was only partially able to maintain this constituency, as other sections organized inside the Democratic Front New Guatemala.

The party was closely affiliated with the farmers' association Committee for Peasant Unity (CUC) since the civil war era. The union was officially founded on 15 April 1978 to organize peasant farmers and improve their economic conditions. Some of its members later rose to prominent roles inside the URNG, like Secretary General Gregorio Chay and Pablo Ceto, the presidential candidate for the party in 2019.

In contrast to many other parties in Guatemala, the party has a widespread and permanent organizational structure in place.

== Party platform and ideology ==
A study from FLASCO Guatemala, released in 2006, analysing the coherence of the party ideology between secretaries general, rank-and-file members and party statutes in Guatemala, uncovered that only the URNG showed internal congruence.

=== Foreign policy ===
The URNG maintains an amicable relationship with the Cuban government and has condemned the economic, financial and political blockade of Cuba, exerted by the United States.

=== Environmental policy ===
The party is generally opposed to large mining projects, citing the adverse effects these have on rural communities and the local environment, while profits are usually siphoned off to multinational companies.

=== Domestic policy ===
==== CICIG ====
The party supported the implementation of a UN sponsored Commission for the Investigation of Illegal Groups and Clandestine Security Organizations in Guatemala (CICIACS) reached in an agreement between the Minister of Foreign Affairs and the Human Rights Ombudsman in March 2003, but heavily criticized the Berger administration for its approach towards its translation into law, which it viewed as weak and inadequate and inhibited by delay tactics.

In December 2006, a new agreement between the UN and the government led to the creation of the International Commission against Impunity in Guatemala (CICIG), which finally began to operate in September 2007, after being greenlit by the Constitutional Court and Congress in May and August 2007, respectively.

==== Judicial appointment process ====
In May 2009, the party supported a bill presented by Nineth Montenegro and the civil society group Pro Justicia, that would regulate the selection process of magistrates. According to proponents of the law, the appointment process should be held in public to prohibit nepotism and ensure transparency.

==== Non-governmental organizations ====
In February 2019, the party voiced its opposition to initiative 5257, a bill concerning the regulation of non-governmental organizations, that would grant the president the power to prohibit NGO's from operating in the country.

==== Peace treaty implementation ====
Party members have on multiple occasions complained that key aspects of the Firm and Lasting Accord have not been enacted in the aftermath of its signing. A study by the Kroc Institute for International Peace Studies at the University of Notre Dame found that 10 years after the peace treaty coming into force, still less than 70% of the peace treaty provisions had been implemented.

The party strongly objected to restitution payments to Ex-PAC fighters that were recruited to fight them during the civil war and dissolved during the peace negotiations in 1996.

==== Press freedom ====
In March 2023, the party condemned the intention of the government and judiciary to prosecute independent media outlets, particularly El Periódico and its journalists, which the party views as efforts to punish them for its investigations into the government.

=== Security and military policy ===
The party is opposed to the deployment of military police units to support the civil police in combating crime. In early 2000, the alliance heavily criticized a bill passed by Congress, extending the operational area of the military police force, calling it a direct violation of the peace treaty that explicitly reserves matters of internal security to the civil police force.

In April 2004, the party received the proposed cuts to the military budget by the Berger administration as a positive signal for the demilitarisation of the public sphere.

==== Nuevos Horizontes ====
In late 2006, the URNG opposed the approval of the US-military mission Nuevos Horizontes by Congress, entailing the stationing of US troops in San Marcos from January to August 2007. The party later in January 2010, also voiced their opposition to the reopening of military barracks in San Marcos, which would cost the state at least Q100m. Miguel Ángel Sandoval argued that this would just be another step to increase the militarisation of the department, arguing instead for an increased presence of civil police forces and an end to the impunity experienced by criminals.

=== Economic policy ===
==== CAFTA ====
Stating that they are not principally opposed to open markets, the party nonetheless opposed the ratification of CAFTA in early 2005, because it favoured genetically modified agricultural products, that are cheaper than home-grown cereals, thereby depriving small farmers of their livelihood.

==== Mesoamerica Project ====
In connection to the hydro power development plans linked to the Mesoamerica Project, formerly known as the Plan Puebla Panamá, the URNG demanded that the local population has to be involved in the planning process of these projects. Marcos Ramírez, the mayor of Playa Grande also stated that these projects should be built and maintained by the local and national governments instead of relinquishing control thereof to multinational corporations.

== Electoral history ==
=== Presidential elections ===
Election	Candidates		First round		Second round		Status
Election	President	Vice President	Votes	%	Votes	%	Status
1999 (Note: Joint ticket of the New Nation Alliance.)	Álvaro Colom	Vitalino Similox Salazar	270,891	12.36 (#3)	—N/a	—N/a	Lost ✗
2003	Rodrigo Asturias	Pablo Ceto	69,297	2.58 (#6)	—N/a	—N/a	Lost ✗
2007	Miguel Ángel Sandoval	Walda Barrios Ruiz	70,208	2.14 (#10)	—N/a	—N/a	Lost ✗
2011 (Note: Joint ticket of the Broad Front of the Left.)	Rigoberta Menchú	Aníbal García	145,080	3.26 (#6)	—N/a	—N/a	Lost ✗
2015 (Note: Joint ticket with Winaq.)	Miguel Ángel Sandoval	Mario Ellintong	101,347	2.11 (#11)	—N/a	—N/a	Lost ✗
2019	Pablo Ceto	Blanca Estela Colop	94,531	2.16 (#12)	—N/a	—N/a	Lost ✗
2023	Amílcar Pop	Mónica Enríquez	87,676	2.09 (#10)	—N/a	—N/a	Lost ✗

=== Legislative elections ===
Election	Votes	%	Seats	+/–	Status
1999 (Note: Run as part of the New Nation Alliance.)	233,870	11.04 (#3)	9 / 113	New	Opposition
2003	107,276	4.20 (#7)	2 / 158	▼7	Opposition
2007	112,249	2.78 (#10)	2 / 158	0	Opposition
2011 (Note: Run as part of the Broad Front of the Left.)	143,238	3.27 (#7)	2 / 158	0	Opposition
2015 (Note: Run in coalition with Winaq.)	198,715	4.36 (#9)	1 / 158	▼1	Opposition
2019	112,037	2.78 (#16)	3 / 160	▲2	Opposition
2023	133,694	3.21 (#9)	0 / 160	▼3 (Note: Although the Winaq-URNG coalition won one seat, it belongs to the Winaq party, leaving the URNG for the first time without representation in Congress.)	Extra-parliamentary

== See also ==
- History of Guatemala
- Guatemalan Civil War
- Guatemalan genocide
