= Guatemalan Party of Labour =

Former political party in Guatemala

Guatemalan Labour Party Partido Guatemalteco del Trabajo
- Leader: Ricardo Rosales
- Founder: José Manuel Fortuny
- Founded: 1949
- Dissolved: 1998
- Preceded by: Democratic Vanguard faction of the Revolutionary Action Party
- Succeeded by: Guatemalan National Revolutionary Unity
- Military wing: Rebel Armed Forces (1960–1968)
- Ideology: Communism; Marxism–Leninism
- National affiliation: Guatemalan National Revolutionary Unity

Party flag

The Guatemalan Labour Party (Partido Guatemalteco del Trabajo) was a Marxist-Leninist party in Guatemala. It existed from 1949 to 1998. It gained prominence during the government of Jacobo Arbenz. It was one of the main forces of opposition to the various regimes that followed Arbenz's overthrow, and later became a constituent of the URNG guerrilla coalition during the later phase of the country's Civil War.

== First Congress ==
The party, then under the name Communist Party of Guatemala (Partido Comunista de Guatemala) held its constituent first congress on 28 September 1949. It was founded by the Guatemalan Democratic Vanguard, which had functioned as a fraction within the ruling Revolutionary Action Party for two years. José Manuel Fortuny had been the leader of VDG, and now became general secretary of PCG. At the time of the congress of the party, its membership stood at 43.

An earlier Communist Party of Guatemala had been founded in 1922, but was suppressed in 1932.

In June 1950 PCG started publishing a weekly newspaper, Octubre, which was distributed amongst workers, peasants and intellectuals throughout the country.

In the summer of 1950 a section of the party, led by trade union leader Víctor Manuel Gutiérrez, broke away and formed a separate party, the Guatemalan Revolutionary Workers Party (PROG). PROG made its first public appearance on 1 July. The split had been provoked by differences of opinions concerning the social composition of the Central Committee of the party.

== Second Congress ==
On 2 February 1952 PROG was dissolved and its members returned to PCG. The 2nd congress of PCG, held the same year, elected Gutiérrez as a Central Committee member. The congress also decided to adopt the name PGT, a move which was intended to facilitate legalization of the party. A 1945 legislation banned "international organizations" from working in Guatemala, a legislation used to maintain the illegality of any communist organization. By changing the name to PGT the party wanted to state that it was an independent and national party. At the same time, communists came to use the similar names abroad. One prominent example is the Swiss Party of Labour.

However, Although communism had not been officially legalized until the inauguration of reformist president Jacobo Arbenz, the party had participated in political activities more or less openly; some avowed communists were employed in high-level positions in the civil service and educational bureaucracy. The PGT program tended to emphasize participation in the trade unions and direct action rather than electoral politics, though at one point there were four PGT members in the 58-seat parliament in the period of 1953-1954. The four PGT MPs were José Alberto Cardoza, Victor Manuel Gutiérrez, Carlos Manuel Pellecer and Antonio Ardón.

The PGT was generally supportive of the reform efforts launched by Juan José Arévalo and Arbenz after the overthrow of right-wing military dictator Gen. Jorge Ubico in 1944. Because of this, the governments and press in Western countries (especially the United States) attempted to gather support for an economic or military intervention to halt the 'Communist threat'. A CIA intelligence estimate in 1952 reported that the PGT had a membership of about five hundred and an undetermined number of sympathizers. Later estimates raised the membership total to 3,000, including a group of five hundred described as 'hard-core'. The PGT publication Octubre had a circulation of about 3,000 in 1952. American intelligence briefings and post reports conceded that the PGT did not have sufficient popular backing or resources to foment a coup or revolution.

On 2 August 1953 Octubre was substituted by Tribuna Popular as the party organ.

The land reform initiatives implemented by the Arbenz government attracted more foreign attention to Guatemala's political scene. About 100,000 landless peasants were to benefit from the expropriation of unused arable land from landed interests (such as the U.S.-based United Fruit Company). The plan was never fully executed, as the Arbenz government fell in a U.S.-sponsored coup d'état on 29 June 1954; the government offered no significant resistance. The first decree issued by the new military régime banned the PGT. Following the ban a section of the party, including Fortuny, went into exile in Mexico where they continued to operate politically. Inside Guatemala, PGT was largely marginalized.

== Third Congress ==
In the underground, PGT was radicalized. The 3rd party congress proclaimed the importance of "all forms of struggle", meaning that armed struggle was justified against the regime. This marked a shift of policy, as the party until then had worked under the banner of "democratic restoration". In April 1961 the party had adopted a document titled "General Tactics, development and forms of struggle of the Guatemalan revolution", which mentioned armed struggle as one of different kind of struggle to be utilized.

The party rallied survivors of the failed 13 November 1960 military insurrection and student radicals into forming a guerilla movement, the Rebel Armed Forces (Fuerzas Armadas Rebeldes, FAR) in 1962. FAR initiated attacks against the government military, the beginning of a four decade long civil war.

Meanwhile, the relation of the party towards the armed struggle was not uncomplicated. In theory the armed forces of FAR stood under the political control of PGT. In practice, that was not always the case. FAR developed its own political leadership and started criticizing the PGT leadership for indifference towards the armed struggle. Within the party Ricardo Ramírez led the radical section.

PGT suffered a setback in early March 1966, as raids were conducted against the party leadership. Thirty-three left-wing leaders 'disappeared', including Víctor Manuel Gutiérrez and Leonardo Castillo Flores. CIA documents, declassified in 1998, confirmed that they had been executed by the state forces.

In the mid 1960s the U.S. State Department estimated the party membership to be approximately 1300.

The 1966 presidential elections highlighted differences within the party. After much discussions the party decided to support the candidature of Julio César Méndez, claiming that he represented progressive and democratic sectors. At the same time the party maintained its support to the ongoing armed struggle. After Méndez had been elected he continued the anti-communist path of his predecessors, leading to accusations within PGT that the party leadership had adopted an incorrect line ahead of the elections. Some analysts claim that the killings of leaders of the older and more moderate generation within PGT, like Gutiérrez and Castillo, effectively closed the openings towards a peaceful settlement of the emerging civil war and emboldened the younger generation to take the more radical path.

In 1968 FAR broke its bond with PGT, reconstituting itself as the Revolutionary Armed Forces (Fuerzas Armadas Revolucionarias, FAR II). FAR was able to win over a large section of the youths and students from PGT, resulting in a severe setback for the party amongst those sections.

Whereas the main difference between the PGT leadership and the young radicals of FAR concern the line towards the armed struggle, there were also other issues of diverging views. A crucial issue was to consider the poverty of the majority of Guatemalans only as an issue of class, or whether the indigenous populations were subjected to racist oppression. PGT maintained an orthodox marxist understanding, that the poverty of the indigenous peoples were an issue of class and that the solution to their problems was to be handled within the framework of class struggle. The emerging guevarist leftist groups, however, developed an understanding that the indigenous peoples suffered from forms of oppression that could not only be explained as issues of class. These differences would remain during years to come, and has resurfaced even after the consolidation of URNG as a unified political party.

== Fourth Congress ==
PGT held its fourth congress on 20–22 December 1969. The congress, held in complete clandestinity, adopted the policy of 'Revolutionary People's War'. At this time its base of operations was concentrated to Guatemala City and the southern coast of the country. The party carried out some armed attacks. The party had a brief rapprochement with FAR, that broke down due to political differences.

The party suffered heavily from government repression. On 26 September 1972 state forces captured Bernardo Alvarado, PGT general secretary, Mario Silva Jonama, Central Committee Secretary of PGT, Carlos René Valle y Valle, Carlos Alvarado Jerez, Hugo Barrios Klee and Miguel Angel Hernández, PGT Central Committee members, Fantina Rodríguez, party member, and the domestic worker Natividad Franco Santos, in a raid in Guatemala City. The following day the president Carlos Arana ordered their execution and that the bodies of the executed be dumped into the sea.

On 21 December 1974 the body of the party general secretary, Huberto Alvarado Arellano, was found. He had been subjected to torture and killed. In total, during the period of 1972–1983, two PGT general secretaries and nineteen Central Committee members were 'disappeared' and killed.

In spite of the harsh repression, PGT was able to consolidate its political strength. By the midst of the 1970s, it had reactivated its Northern, Central, Western and Eastern Regional Committees. After Alvarado's death, Ricardo Rosales (whose nom de guerre in PGT was Carlos González) was appointed interim general secretary. He was given the task to organize a 5th party congress. Moreover, the party reactivated the dormant Military Commission of the Central Committee. The party gained political presence in the trade union movement through the Federación Autónoma Sindical de Guatemala (FASGUA) and JPT was one of the forces working with the Association of University Students (AEU).

== Fragmentation ==
However, PGT failed to maintain its unity for long. On 29 May 1978 a massacre occurred in Panzós. Following the massacre massive protests erupted in Guatemala City. These happenings contributed to another wave of radicalization amongst the left-wing in Guatemala, which would divide PGT.

On 11 June the Military Commission ('Comil') of PGT carried out a bomb attack in retaliation of the Panzós massacre against the Mobile Police in the northern region, in which 25 policemen were killed. However, the Political Commission of the Central Committee of the party denied PGT involvement in the attack. The line of the party leadership was that actions like that were bound to produce a government response of increasing state repression.

Now some sections of PGT claimed that the party had an ambiguous relation to the ongoing armed struggle. The dissidents rallied around a Núcleo de Dirección y Conducción de la lucha interna, in which Central Committee and Comil members participated. Soon the party was split in two. The dissident faction broke away forming the National Directing Nucleus of PGT (Nucleo de Dirección Nacional del PGT). PGT-NDN was more militant and initiated coordination with FAR and EGP. The remaining group which was led by Ricardo Rosales, which was sometimes referred to as PGT-Central Committee, maintained its role as the official Guatemalan party in the world communist movement.

PGT-NDN won over the South-East Regional Committee, a part of the Southern Regional Committee and a part of the Alamos Zonal Committee (Chimaltenango). Its leader was José Alberto Cardoza (nom de guerre: Mario Sánchez), who had been a PGT Central Committee member up to the split. PGT-CC maintained its hold over the Central, Northern, Western Regional Committees and a section of the Southern Regional Committee.

Soon another section of the party, constituted by a group who had recently joined PGT after leaving FAR and members of Comil from the Central Region and the Alamos Zonal Committee, broke away from PGT to form the Guatemalan Party of Labour - Communist Party (PGT-PC).

When the PGT-NDN and the leftist guerrillas (FAR, EGP, ORPA) joined forces and formed the URNG as a political and military coordination, PGT-CC stayed out of it.

At an expanded meeting of members of the Central Committee, Political Commission and representatives from the Regional Committees and the military structures 5–7 January another mutiny against Rosales' leadership took place. The dissidents formed a parallel party called Guatemalan Party of Labour - 6 January (PGT-6 de Enero).

In 1987 the URNG substituted PGT-NDN for PGT-CC in its leadership. By this time PGT-NDN had been severely marginalized. Since the 1983 capture of Carlos Quinteros ('Miguel'), who had been a leading figure in both PGT-NDN and PGT-PC, these groups were almost wiped out as Quinteros provided the state forces with vast information on their leaders and members.

Thus, following the entry of PGT-CC into URNG, the party worked closely with the other revolutionary movements within the framework of URNG during the final phases of the civil war. Also relations between PGT-CC and PGT-NDN improved, and the two parties were able to hold a joint celebration of the 38th anniversary of the foundation of the party.

== Peace accord and merger into the URNG ==
On 29 December 1996 a peace agreement was signed between the government of Álvaro Arzú and the URNG. When the URNG transformed from a coalition of different groups to a unified political party in 1998, the four constituents merged into it. EGP and FAR were the first to dissolve their organizations, then PGT-CC and ORPA. The Provisional Leading Junta of URNG included Ricardo Rosales from PGT as its secretary.

In October 2005 a group, claiming to represent former members of PGT, PGT-NDN, EGP, FAR and JPT, founded a party with the name PGT.
