= Rebel Armed Forces =

Guatemalan guerrilla organisation (1961-1996)

- Fuerzas Armadas Rebeldes
- Leader: Luis Augusto Turcios Lima (Until 1966)
- Dates active: 1960–1971
- Active regions: Guatemala
- Ideology: Communism; Marxism-Leninism; Factions: Trotskyism
- Political position: Far-left
- Size: unknown
- Part of: URNG
- Wars: Guatemalan Civil War

The Rebel Armed Forces (Spanish: Fuerzas Armadas Rebeldes, FAR) was a Guatemalan guerrilla organization established in 1961 and lasting until the peace agreements in 1996.

In the late 1960s, the Guatemalan government began a United States-backed counter-insurgency campaign that killed between 2,800 and 8,000 FAR supporters in eastern Guatemala. The survivors of this campaign, which devastated the FAR, regrouped in Mexico City in the 1970s, and founded the Guerrilla Army of the Poor (EGP), which succeeded in mobilizing tremendous popular support over the next few years.

FAR is most significantly known for having killed the U.S. ambassador to Guatemala, John Gordon Mein, in 1968. Also killed that year were two U.S. military advisers, Colonel John Webber and Ernest Munro, although they might have been killed at the command of PGT leader Leonardo Castillo Johnson.

In 1970, the group briefly kidnapped Guatemala's foreign minister Alberto Fuentes Mohr, but freed him in exchange for the release of a student leader. Karl von Spreti, West German ambassador to Guatemala, was kidnapped and murdered by the FAR as well in that year. Further actions that year included the kidnapping of U.S. labor attaché Sean Holly, he was freed for the release of FAR prisoners.

== Notes and references ==
Sources

- McAllister, Carlota (2010). "A Headlong Rush into the Future". In Grandin, Greg; Joseph, Gilbert (eds.). A Century of Revolution. Durham, NC: Duke University Press. pp. 276–309.

== See also ==
- Revolutionary Movement 13th November
