= Torture in the United States =

There are cases, both documented and alleged, that involve the usage of torture by members of the United States government, military, law enforcement agencies, intelligence agencies, healthcare services, and other public organizations both in and out of the country.

Torture is illegal in the United States. The United States came under scrutiny for controversial practices, both from foreign and domestic sources, following the Military Commissions Act of 2006.

After the U.S. dismissed United Nations concerns about torture in 2006, one UK judge observed 'America's idea of what is torture ... does not appear to coincide with that of most civilized nations'.

While the term "torture" has a variety of definitions and cultural contexts, this article addresses only those practices qualifying as torture under the definition of that term articulated in the codified law (primarily statutory) and case law of the United States. (Note: See article on precising definition.)

The Human Rights Measurement Initiative gives the U.S. a score of 2.7 out of 10 for the right to freedom from torture and ill-treatment.

== Legislation, regulation, and treaties regarding torture ==
There is no federal criminal statute against torture specifically within the U.S.^{:paragraph 13} There is a federal criminal statute against committing torture outside the U.S. However, according to the Committee Against Torture, "despite the occurrence of cases of extraterritorial torture of detainees, no prosecutions have been initiated under the extraterritorial criminal torture statute"^{:paragraph 13} There is a federal criminal statute against assault and battery within the U.S., and torture would fall under this, but torture is more than mere assault and battery. There is also a federal law defining torture. There are state laws outlawing torture. Torture is also a violation of international law per the United Nations Convention Against Torture (UNCAT). It is a "crime against humanity", and this has "universal jurisdiction". However, outside of the "universal jurisdiction" potential avenue for prosecution (i.e. some other country prosecutes acts of torture committed by the U.S. Government), there is no practical method of enforcement for torture committed by the U.S. as a violation of international law. This is because the U.S. is a signatory of the Rome Statute and is not party to the International Criminal Court. The UN Security Council (UNSC) can recommend cases to the ICC, but the U.S. can, as one of the five permanent members of the UNSC, veto the recommendation.

=== Prohibition under domestic law ===
==== Bill of Rights ====
Torture as a punishment falls under the cruel and unusual punishment clause of the Eighth Amendment to the United States Constitution. The text of the Amendment states that:

Excessive bail shall not be required, nor excessive fines imposed, nor cruel and unusual punishments inflicted.

The U.S. Supreme Court has held since at least the 1890s that punishments which involved torture are forbidden under the Eighth Amendment.

==== 18 U.S.C. § 2340 (the "Torture Act") ====
An act of torture committed outside the United States by a U.S. national or a non-U.S. national who is present in the United States is punishable under 18 U.S.C. § 2340. The definition of torture used is as follows:

As used in this chapter—

(1) "torture" means an act committed by a person acting under the color of law specifically intended to inflict severe physical or mental pain or suffering (other than pain or suffering incidental to lawful sanctions) upon another person within his custody or physical control;
(2) "severe mental pain or suffering" means the prolonged mental harm caused by or resulting from—

(A) the intentional infliction or threatened infliction of severe physical pain or suffering;
(B) the administration or application, or threatened administration or application, of mind-altering substances or other procedures calculated to disrupt profoundly the senses or the personality;
(C) the threat of imminent death; or
(D) the threat that another person will imminently be subjected to death, severe physical pain or suffering, or the administration or application of mind-altering substances or other procedures calculated to disrupt profoundly the senses or personality; and

(3) "United States" means the several states of the United States, the District of Columbia, and the commonwealths, territories, and possessions of the United States.

==== Military Commissions Act of 2006 ====
In October 2006, the United States enacted the Military Commissions Act of 2006, authorizing the President to conduct military tribunals of enemy combatants and to hold them indefinitely without judicial review under the terms of habeas corpus. Testimony coerced through humiliating or degrading treatment would be admissible in the tribunals. Amnesty International and others have criticized the Act for approving a system that uses torture, destroying the mechanisms for judicial review created by Hamdan v. Rumsfeld, and creating a parallel legal system below international standards. Part of the act was an amendment that retroactively rewrote the War Crimes Act, effectively making policymakers (i.e., politicians and military leaders), and those applying policy (i.e., Central Intelligence Agency interrogators and U.S. soldiers), no longer subject to legal prosecution under U.S. law for what, before the amendment, was defined as a war crime, such as torture. Because of that, critics describe the MCA as an amnesty law for crimes committed during the war on terror.

==== U.S. Army Field Manuals ====
In late 2006, the military issued updated U.S. Army Field Manuals on intelligence collection (FM 2-22.3. Human Intelligence Collector Operations, September 2006) and counterinsurgency (FM 3-24. Counterinsurgency, December 2006). Both manuals reiterated that "no person in the custody or under the control of DOD, regardless of nationality or physical location, shall be subject to torture or cruel, inhuman, or degrading treatment or punishment, in accordance with and as defined in U.S. law." Specific techniques prohibited in the intelligence collection manual include:

- Forcing the detainee to be naked, perform sexual acts, or pose in a sexual manner;
- Hooding, that is, placing hoods or sacks over the head of a detainee; using duct tape over the eyes;
- Applying beatings, electric shock, burns, or other forms of physical pain;
- Waterboarding;
- Using military working dogs;
- Inducing hypothermia or heat injury;
- Conducting mock executions;
- Depriving the detainee of necessary food, water, sleep, or medical care.

=== Prohibition under international law ===
Torture in all forms is banned by the 1948 Universal Declaration of Human Rights (UDHR), which the United States participated in drafting. The United States is a party to the following international treaties that prohibits torture, such as the 1949 Geneva Conventions (signed 1949; ratified 1955), the American Convention on Human Rights (signed 1977), the International Covenant on Civil and Political Rights (signed 1977; ratified 1992), and the United Nations Convention against Torture and Other Cruel, Inhuman or Degrading Treatment or Punishment (signed 1988; ratified 1994). It has neither signed nor ratified the Inter-American Convention to Prevent and Punish Torture. International law defines torture during an armed conflict as a war crime. It also mandates that any person involved in ordering, allowing, and even insufficiently preventing and prosecuting war crimes is criminally liable under the command responsibility doctrine.

== Historical practices of torture ==
=== Slavery ===
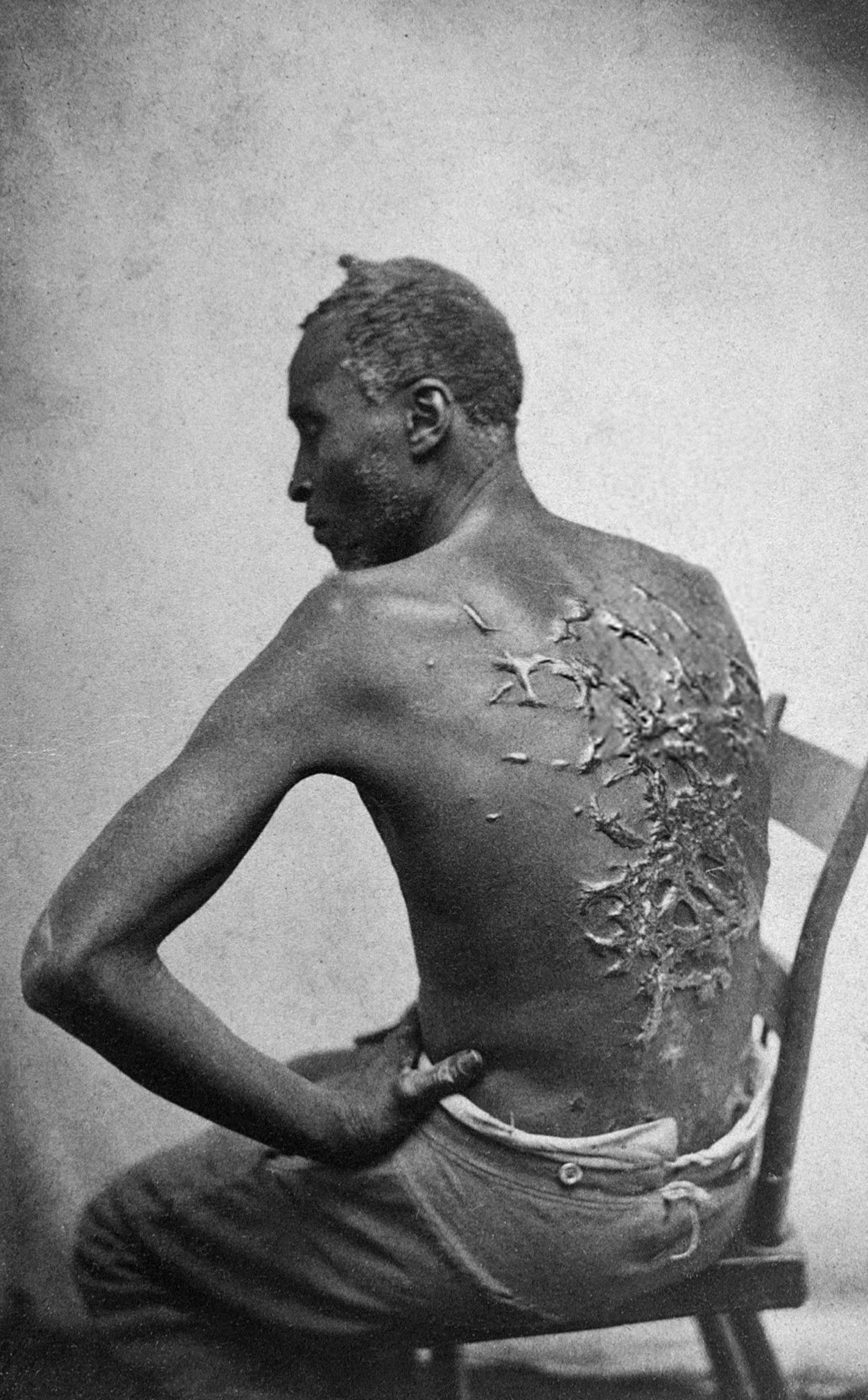
Peter, a slave from Louisiana, photographed 1863, was whipped by his overseer.

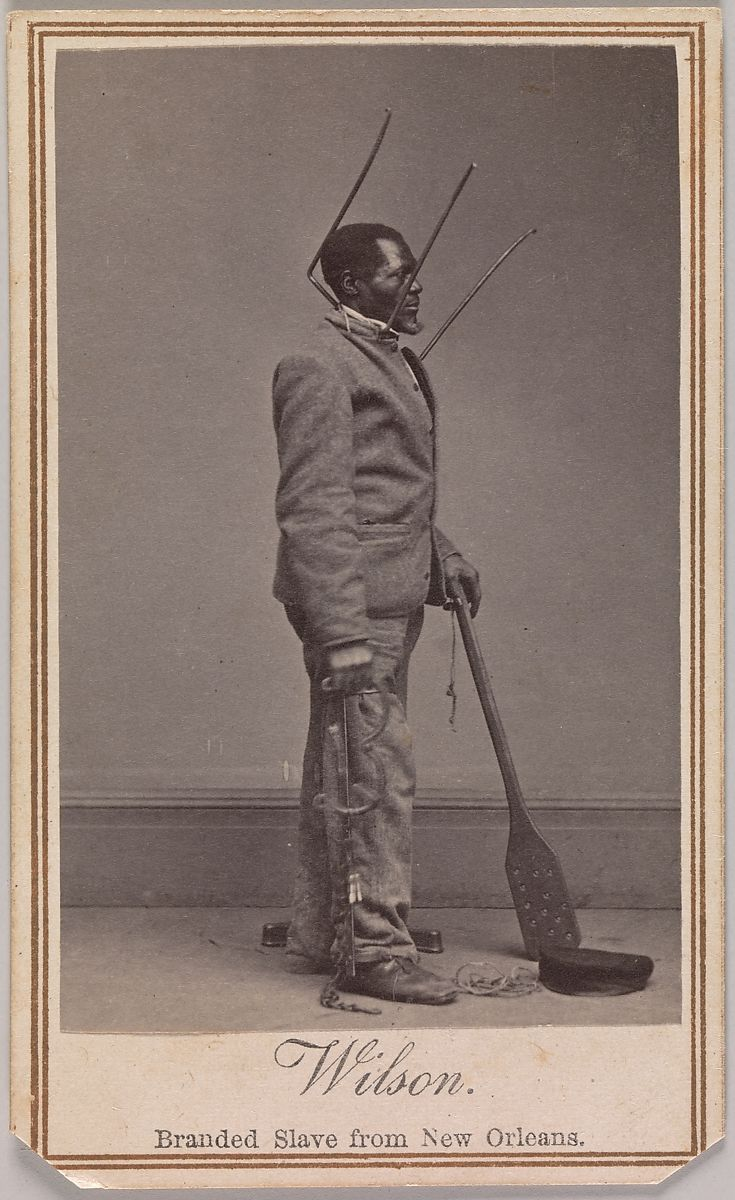
Wilson Chinn, a branded slave from Louisiana, photographed with instruments of torture used to punish slaves

People living as slaves were regulated both in their service and when walking in public by legally authorized violence. On large plantations, slave overseers were authorized to whip and brutalize noncompliant slaves. Slave codes authorized, indemnified or even required the use of violence and were long criticized by abolitionists for their brutality. Slaves as well as free Blacks were regulated by the Black Codes, and had their movements regulated by patrollers and slave catchers, conscripted from the white population, who were allowed to use summary punishment against escapees, which included maiming or killing them.

=== Lynching ===
Lynching was a public act of murder, torture, and mutilation carried out by crowds, primarily against African Americans. A form of mob violence and social control, usually involving (but by no means restricted to) the illegal hanging and burning of suspected criminals, lynch law cast its pall over the Southern United States from the mid-19th to the mid-20th centuries. Victims were usually black men, often accused of acting uppity (being insolent) towards, assaulting, having sex with, or raping white people.

The documented murders of 4,743 people who were lynched in the United States between 1882 and 1968 were not often publicized. It is likely that many more unrecorded lynchings occurred during and after this period which influenced The Great Migration of 6.5 million African Americans away from southern states. A 1970s lynching site found in Noxubee County, Mississippi, a location central to regional mob violence, belies the continuation of lynching as a torture method.

Most lynchings were inspired by unsolved crime, racism, and innuendo. Three-and-a-half thousand of its victims were African Americans. Lynchings took place in every state except four, but were concentrated in the Cotton Belt. Forms of violence and torture also included genital mutilation, strangulation, maiming and the severing of limbs. Both police and lawmakers, and later federal agents, were frequently complicit in lynching while affiliated with Ku Klux Klan groups, releasing prisoners to lynch crowds and/or refusing to prosecute the participants in a public act of murder. Despite numerous attempts to do so, federal anti-lynching legislation was consistently defeated. In 2022, lynching became recognized as a federal hate crime in the United States.

=== "Third degree" ===
The use of "third degree interrogation" techniques in order to compel confession, ranging from "psychological duress such as prolonged confinement to extreme violence and torture", was widespread and considered acceptable in early American policing. In 1910 the direct application of physical violence in order to force a confession became a media issue and some courts began to deny obviously compelled confessions. In response to this, "covert third degree torture" became popular, since it left no signs of physical abuse. The publication of the Wickersham Commission's "Report on Lawlessness in Law Enforcement" in 1931 highlighted the widespread use of covert third degree torture by the police to force confessions, and led to a subsequent decline in its use over the 1930s and 1940s.

=== World War II ===
During World War II, the U.S. military interrogated high-level Nazis at a secret camp, "P. O. Box 1142," outside Washington, D.C. The interrogators did not use physical torture, but did use psychological tricks, like threatening to turn the prisoner over to the Soviets.

Some captured German U-boat crewmen were subjected to "shock interrogation" techniques, including exhausting physical exercise and beatings, after their capture during Operation Teardrop.

After the war, in 1948, the United States Air Force invited German Luftwaffe interrogator Hanns Scharff to brief them on his interrogation techniques, which did not use physical means to obtain information.

=== Torture abroad during the Cold War ===
American officials were involved in counter-insurgency programs in which they encouraged their allies, such as the ARVN to use torture, and actively participated in it, during the 1960s to the 1980s. From 1967 to at least 1972, the Central Intelligence Agency coordinated the Phoenix Program, which targeted the infrastructure of the Communist National Front for the Liberation of South Vietnam ("Viet Cong"). The program killed 26,000 Viet Cong and captured over 60,000. Critics of the program assert that many of those identified by the program as Viet Cong members were actually civilians, who when captured suffered torture by the South Vietnamese Army, under CIA supervision.

American trainers and intelligence coordination officials supported the internal security apparatus of the regimes of South America's southern cone as those regimes carried out kidnappings, "disappearances", torture and assassinations during the 1970s and 1980s as part of Operation Condor. Similar support was provided to right-wing governments of Central America, particularly in the 1980s. Numerous participants in these abuses were trained by the U.S. Army School of the Americas. Americans were present as supervisors in the Mariona Prison in San Salvador, El Salvador, well known for a wide variety of forms of torture. One author, Jennifer Harbury, focussing on Central America, concluded that "A review of the materials leads relentlessly to just one conclusion: that the CIA and related U.S. intelligence agencies have since their inception engaged in the widespread practice of torture, either directly or through well-paid proxies."

In 2014, a report by Brazil's National Truth Commission asserted that the United States government was involved in teaching torture techniques to the Brazilian military government of 1964–85.

=== Torture by countries with U.S. training – post-World War II to 1975 ===
"Torture countries" with U.S. training according to Amnesty International
Torture country	U.S.-trained military/police	U.S. military aid (1946–1975) – $US(1979)
Greece	14,144	2,794,900,000
Portugal	2,997	361,900,000
Spain	9,872	920,200,000
Turkey	18,900	4,576,400,00
Indonesia	4,757	218,200,000
Philippines	15,245	805,800,000
South Korea	32,479	6,542,300,000
South Vietnam	35,788	16,490,500,000
Iran	10,807	1,412,500,000
Saudi Arabia	1,380	295,900,000
Morocco	2,209	138,700,000
Tunisia	636	62,400,000
Venezuela	5,341	142,200,000
Uruguay	2,537	85,900,000
Paraguay	1,435	26,400,000
Peru	6,734	193,500,000
Nicaragua	4,897	25,500,000
Mexico	738	14,300,000
Haiti	567	4,200,000
Guatemala	3,030	39,300,000
Dominican Republic	3,705	38,200,000
Colombia	6,200	154,800,00
Chile	6,328	216,900,000
Brazil	8,448	603,100,00
Bolivia	3,956	56,600,000
Argentina	3,676	230,300,000

Source: Chomsky, Noam, Herman, Edward S. The Washington Connection and Third World Fascism, Spokesman (1979), ISBN 0-89608-090-0, pg 361.

==== U.S. intelligence training manuals ====
The Torture Manuals was a nickname for seven training manuals that had excerpts declassified to the public on September 20, 1996, by the Pentagon.

One was the 1963 CIA document, KUBARK Counterintelligence Interrogation, which describes interrogation techniques, including, among other things, "coercive counterintelligence interrogation of resistant sources." The CIA techniques involved were used in the CIA's Phoenix Program in South Vietnam. Eventually the CIA's psychological methods were spread worldwide through the U.S. Agency for International Development's Public Safety program and U.S. Army Mobile Training Teams.

Other manuals were prepared by the U.S. military and used between 1987 and 1991 for intelligence training courses at the U.S. Army School of the Americas (SOA). The manuals were also distributed by Special Forces Mobile Training teams to military personnel and intelligence schools in Colombia, Ecuador, El Salvador, Guatemala, and Peru.

The manuals advise that torture techniques can backfire and that the threat of pain is often more effective than pain itself. The manuals describe coercive techniques to be used "to induce psychological regression in the subject by bringing a superior outside force to bear on his will to resist." These techniques include prolonged constraint, prolonged exertion, extremes of heat, cold, or moisture, deprivation of food or sleep, disrupting routines, solitary confinement, threats of pain, deprivation of sensory stimuli, hypnosis, and use of drugs or placebos.

In a July 2002 memo sent to the Pentagon's chief lawyer by the military's Joint Personnel Recovery Agency, or JPRA, the military agency that provided advice on harsh interrogation techniques for use against terrorism suspects, not only referred to the application of extreme duress as "torture" but warned that it would produce "unreliable information".

== Domestic torture in modern times ==
=== Domestic police and prisons ===
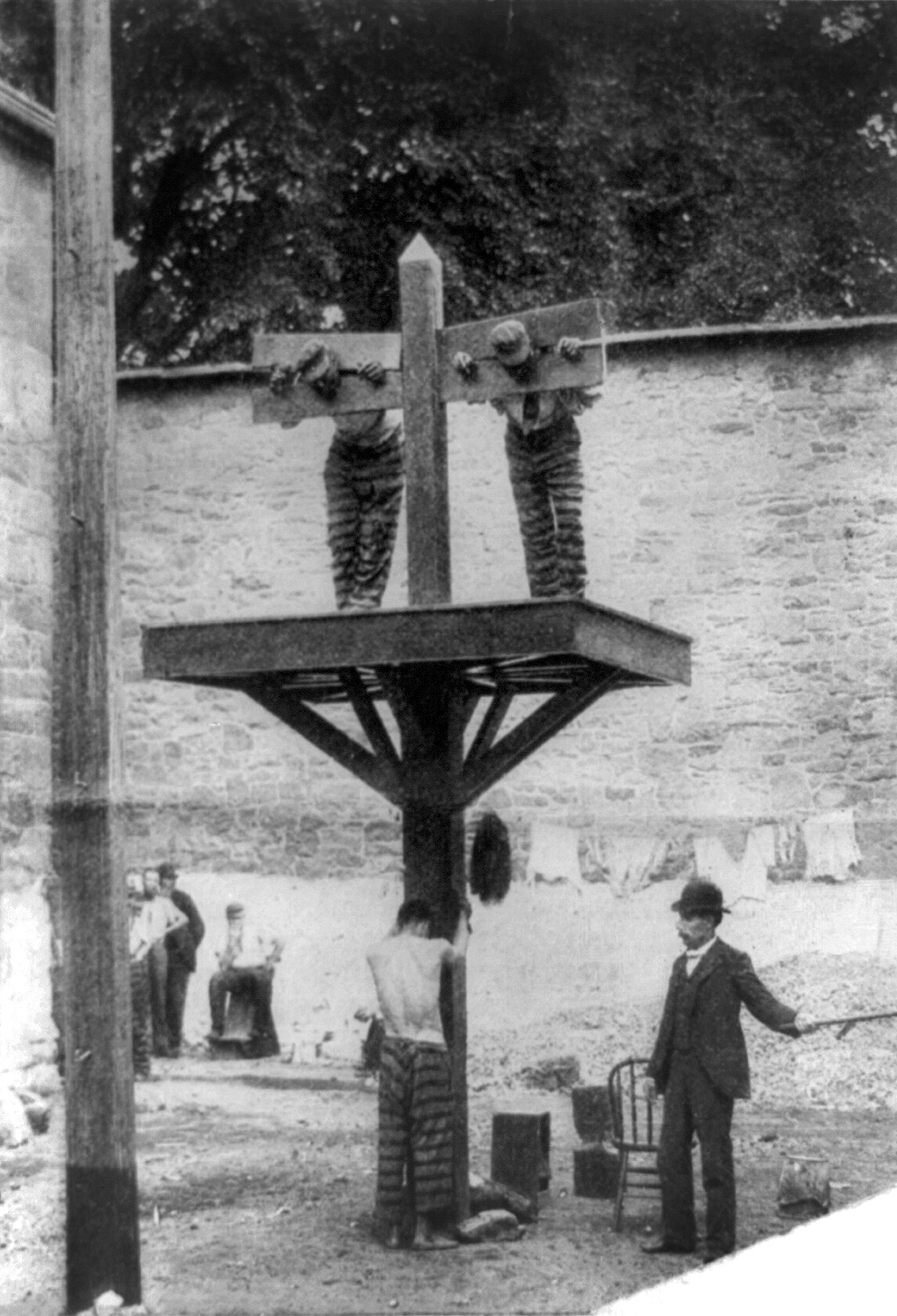
Prisoners at a whipping post in a Delaware prison, c. 1907

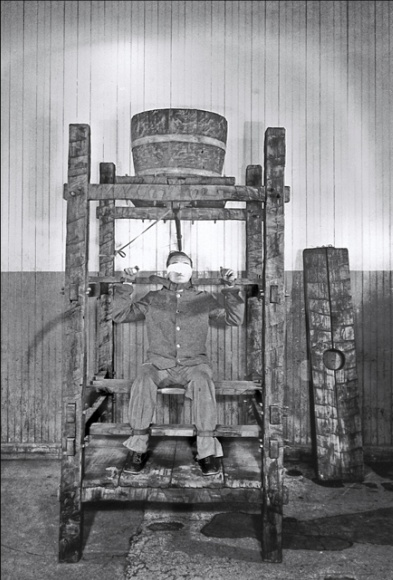
Water torture in Sing Sing, New York, 1890

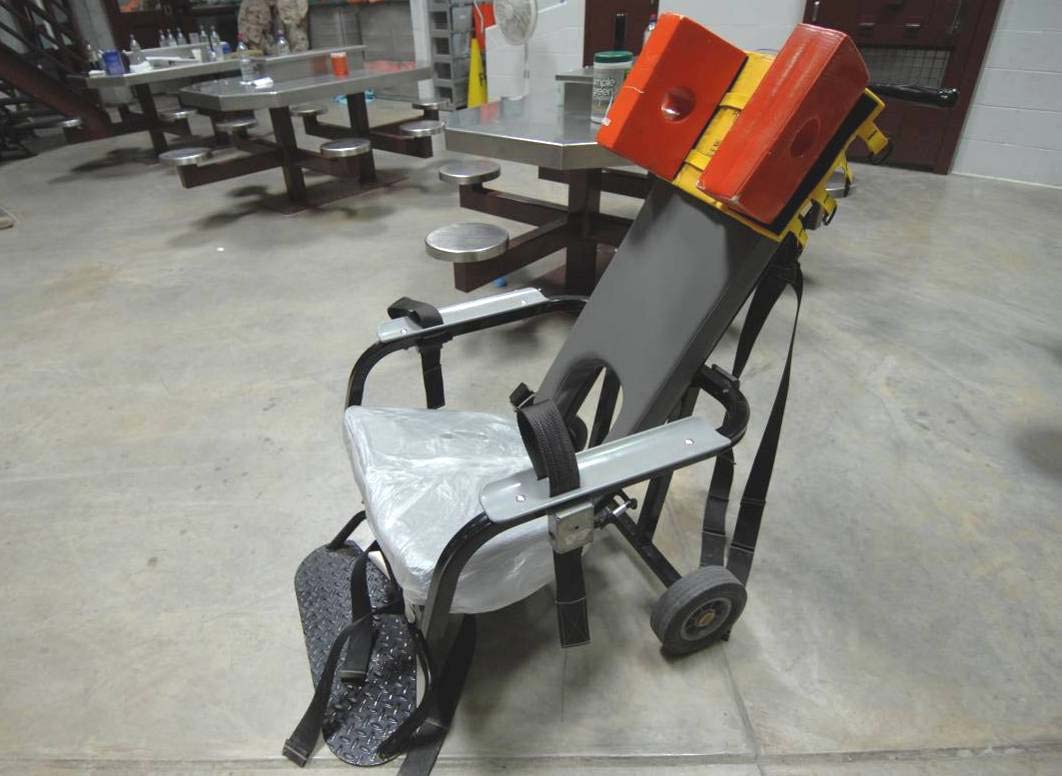
Human rights critics have called the use of restraint chairs at Guantanamo Bay for force-feeding a form of torture.

==== Police brutality ====
In more modern policing, police brutality has involved torture. Police officials have generally described these cases as aberrations or the actions of criminals in police uniform, as New York City Police Commissioner Howard Safir described the attack on Abner Louima. Police brutality critics, such as law professor Susan Bandes, have argued that such a view is erroneous and that it "allows police brutality to flourish in a number of ways, including making it easier to discount individual stories of police brutality, and weakening the case for any kind of systemic reform."

In 1936, the Supreme Court recognized in Brown v. Mississippi that confessions extracted through police violence are inadmissible as evidence.

In the 1970s and 1980s the Chicago Police Department's Area 2 unit under Commander Jon Burge repeatedly used electroshock, near-suffocation by plastic bags and excessive beating on suspects. The City of Chicago's Office of Professional Standards (OPS) concluded that the physical abuse was systematic and, "The type of abuse described was not limited to the usual beating, but went into such esoteric areas as psychological techniques and planned torture."

In 1997, Abner Louima was sodomized with a plunger by New York City police. The officer was convicted and sentenced to 30 years in prison.

In May 2006 in Geneva, Switzerland the United Nations Committee against Torture released a report, which took note of the "limited investigation and lack of prosecution" in connection to accusations of torture in Areas 2 and 3 of the Chicago Police Department and called on American authorities to "promptly, thoroughly and impartially" investigate the accusations, and provide the committee with more information.

In 1983 Texas sheriff James Parker and three of his deputies were convicted for conspiring to use waterboarding to force confessions. The complaint said they "subject prisoners to a suffocating water torture ordeal in order to coerce confessions. This generally included the placement of a towel over the nose and mouth of the prisoner and the pouring of water in the towel until the prisoner began to move, jerk, or otherwise indicate that he was suffocating and/or drowning." The sheriff was sentenced to ten years in prison, and the deputies to four years.

In September 1997, two former officers from the Adelanto Police Department, San Bernardino County, California, were jailed for two years on federal charges, after pleading guilty to beating a suspect during questioning and forcing another man to lick blood off the floor in 1994.

According to the Innocence Project, about 25 percent of wrongfully convicted innocent people were coerced into making false confessions or false incriminating statements. Most of the victims were threatened by the terror of harsher sentences if they remained non-compliant.

==== Prisoner abuse ====
In 2005, a Channel 4 documentary "Torture: America's Brutal Prisons" showed video of naked prisoners being beaten, bitten by dogs, forced to crawl like worms, kicked in the groin, stunned with Taser guns and electric cattle prods. The guards also had them fight in a deadly duel: the refusal to duel would result in the death of prisoner, shot by the guards. The same fate would be reserved to the loser of duel, only for the guards' fun. A prisoner executed in 2004, Dominique Green, told that two of his row mates were beaten up; the guards then flooded the room, destroying every object owned by one of them: his letters, photos, legal documents, the book he was writing, his typewriter. The date of his execution, en other, was fixed for the following day. Other police officers hit a man, Nanon Williams, macing him in eyes: the subsequent beat-up resulted, for him, in a partial loss of sight. In one case a prisoner is strapped to a restraint chair and left for sixteen hours; two hours after being unshackled he dies from a blood clot. In another, mentally ill prisoner Charles Agster is suffocated to death. Another prisoner is found with a broken neck, broken toes and internal injuries following an argument with guards; after one month in a coma he dies from septicaemia. Fire extinguisher sized canisters of pepper spray are used to cover prisoners with chemicals, and they are then left, resulting in second degree burns. Photos are shown of Frank Valdes, a convicted killer on death row, who was beaten to death after writing to local Florida newspapers with allegations of prison officer corruption and brutality. Many of the segments in the documentary were several years old, e.g. from 1996, and were originally released to lawyers seeking justice for the victims of the offenses shown. Several lawsuits was filed against the prison which resulted in the inmates favor. Other prison officers involved in the incidents were suspended from duty or discharged from their employment.

A 2010 memoir by Wilbert Rideau, an inmate at Angola Prison from 1961 through 2001, states that "slavery was commonplace in Angola with perhaps a quarter of the population in bondage" throughout the 1960s and early 1970s. The New York Times states that weak inmates served as slaves who were raped, gang-raped, and traded and sold like cattle. Rideau stated that "The slave's only way out was to commit suicide, escape or kill his master." Herman Wallace and Albert Woodfox, members of the Angola 3, arrived at Angola in the late 1960s and became active members of the prison's chapter of the Black Panther Party, where they organized petitions and hunger strikes to protest conditions at the prison and helped new inmates protect themselves from rape and enslavement. C. Murray Henderson, one of the wardens brought in to clean up the prison, states in one of his memoirs that the systemic sexual slavery was sanctioned and facilitated by the prison guards.

From the year 2000 onwards, the Supermax facility at the Maine State Prison was the scene of video-taped forcible extractions that Lance Tapley in the Portland Phoenix wrote "look[ed] like torture." Additionally, audio recordings were made of the torture of Lester Siler in Campbell County, Tennessee. Officers involved in the incident were convicted in court and sentenced to 2 to 5 years in prison.

=== Border Patrol and immigration detention ===
The U.S. Border Patrol interdicts people crossing the border and maintains checkpoints and carries out raids in border regions. Human Rights Watch has documented severe human rights abuses by the Border Patrol, "including unjustified killing, torture, and rape, and routine beatings, rough physical treatment, and racially motivated verbal abuse."

Detained immigrants, including refugees seeking asylum, at the Esmor Inc. facility in Elizabeth, New Jersey, rebelled after practices of verbal and physical abuse, humiliation and corporal punishment. After the uprising, two dozen of them were beaten, stripped, forced to crawl through a gauntlet of officers, and made to chant, "America is number one."

A report by the Justice Department Office of the Inspector General on the experience of 762 post-9/11 detainees found confirmed the physical and verbal abuse of detainees. On arrival at the Metropolitan Detention Center in Brooklyn, New York, the detainees were slammed face first into a wall against a shirt with an American flag; the bloodstain left behind was described by one officer as the print of bloody noses and a mouth. Once inside they were threatened with detention for the rest of their lives, verbally abused, exposed to cold, deprived of sleep, and had their hands, cuffed arms, and fingers severely twisted.

== Debates and controversy ==
Torture in the United States remains a controversial issue, with debates surrounding its use in law enforcement, prisons, and national security operations. While the U.S. officially condemns torture, reports of abuses—ranging from police brutality to the treatment of detainees in military facilities like Guantánamo Bay—continue to spark outrage. Human rights organizations and legal experts argue that such practices violate both domestic laws and international treaties. Despite being prohibited by the Eighth Amendment and international treaties like the United Nations Convention Against Torture, there have been multiple instances of alleged torture, particularly in prisons and during interrogations. One of the most infamous cases involves the treatment of detainees at Guantanamo Bay, where reports of abuse, including waterboarding and sensory deprivation, have sparked widespread outrage. In addition to these high-profile cases, there have been numerous allegations of police brutality and abuse in U.S. prisons, where inmates have been subjected to physical and psychological torture. Although the government officially condemns the use of torture, these reports raise questions about the implementation of laws and the broader human rights standards upheld by the U.S. legal system. Critics argue that torture not only violates human rights but also undermines the nation's moral authority and international reputation.

== Torture abroad ==
=== Khalid el-Masri ===
In 2007, the U.S. Supreme Court deferred to state secrets privilege when they refused to hear the case of Khalid el-Masri, who was kidnapped and tortured by the CIA under the Bush administration on December 21, 2003. The ACLU said that torture included methods of "forced anal penetration".

=== Forms of torture and abuse ===
Certain practices of the United States military, civilian agencies such as the CIA, and private contractors have been condemned both domestically and internationally as torture. A fierce debate regarding non-standard interrogation techniques exists within the U.S. civilian and military intelligence community, with no general consensus as to what practices under what conditions are acceptable.

These practices have resulted in a number of deaths. According to Human Rights First, at least as many as 8 detainees have been tortured to death in U.S. custody in Iraq and Afghanistan. The aversion of some military personnel forced to administer torture has been so strong, that one soldier, Alyssa Peterson, is believed to have committed suicide to avoid further participation.

=== Application of Fifth Amendment to overseas torture ===
In 1999, a U.S. court found that the Fifth Amendment does not apply in the case of overseas torture of aliens. Jennifer Harbury, a U.S. citizen whose husband Efraín Bámaca Velásquez had been tortured and murdered by CIA officials in Guatemala, complained that these actions violated her husband's Fifth Amendment right not to be deprived of life or liberty without due process of law. On December 12, 2000, the Court of Appeals for the District Court of Columbia rejected this claim, citing a lack of jurisdiction, since the events were planned and controlled in the United States, but the actual torture and murder occurred in Guatemala, a location where the U.S. did not exercise "de facto political control".

=== Torture, interrogation and prisons in the war on terror ===
The U.S. government torture program since 9/11 has been "breathtaking" in its scope, according to the detailed report submitted to the United Nations Committee Against Torture by the International Human Rights Clinic at Harvard Law School and other human rights activists. According to the 2014 report, the U.S. carried out its torture program in the U.S. Military Base in Guantanamo Bay, Cuba, and secretly in 54 other countries, and the program involved two U.S. administrations: the Bush administration designed, implemented and authorized the torture program, and the Obama administration covered it up and obstructed justice by failing to prosecute U.S. officials who designed and implemented it.

==== "Stress and duress" ====
In 2003 and 2004, there was substantial controversy over the "stress and duress" methods that were used in the United States's "war on terror", that had been sanctioned by the U.S. Executive branch of government at the cabinet level. Similar methods employed against suspected Irish Republic Army members were rule by the ECHR in Ireland v. United Kingdom to be inhuman and degrading treatment, but not torture. CIA agents have anonymously confirmed to The Washington Post in a December 26, 2002, report that the CIA routinely uses so-called "stress and duress" interrogation techniques, which human rights organizations claim are acts of torture, in the "war on terror". These sources state that CIA and military personnel beat up uncooperative suspects, confine them in cramped quarters, duct tape them to stretchers, and use other restraints that maintain the subject in an awkward and painful position for long periods of time. The phrase 'torture lite' has been reported in the media and has been taken to mean acts that would not be legally defined as torture.

Some techniques within the "stress and duress" category, such as water boarding, have long been considered as torture, by both the United States government and human rights groups. In its annual "Country Reports on Human Rights Practices," the U.S. State Department has described the following practices as torture:

- stripping and blindfolding of prisoners (Egypt)
- subjecting prisoners to prolonged sun exposure in high temperatures and tying of hands and feet for extended periods (Eritrea)
- sleep deprivation and "suspension for long periods in contorted positions" (Iran)
- sleep deprivation and solitary confinement (Jordan)
- prolonged standing and isolation (Turkey)

==== Legal analyses ====
In June 2004, The Wall Street Journal, The Washington Post, and The New York Times obtained copies of legal analyses prepared for the CIA and the Justice Department in 2002. These documents developed a legal basis for the use of torture by U.S. interrogators if acting under the directive of the President of the United States. The legal definition of torture by the Justice Department tightly narrowed to define as torture only actions which "must be equivalent in intensity to the pain accompanying serious physical injury, such as organ failure, impairment of bodily function, or even death," and argued that actions that inflict any lesser pain, including moderate or fleeting pain, do not necessarily constitute torture.

It is the position of the United States government that the legal memoranda constituted only permissible legal research, and did not signify the intent of the United States to use torture, which it opposes. Secretary of Defense Donald Rumsfeld has complained about this prominent newspaper coverage and its implications. However, many influential U.S. thinkers also believe that Rumsfeld himself is a major part of the problem, quote the New York Times columnist Bob Herbert:

... there is also the grotesque and deeply shameful issue that will always be a part of Mr. Rumsfeld's legacy—the manner in which American troops have treated prisoners under their control in Iraq, Afghanistan and Guantánamo Bay, Cuba. There is no longer any doubt that large numbers of troops responsible for guarding and interrogating detainees somehow loosed their moorings to humanity, and began behaving as sadists, perverts and criminals.

— Bob Herbert

The Bush administration told the CIA in 2002 that its interrogators working abroad would not violate U.S. prohibitions against torture unless they "have the specific intent to inflict severe pain or suffering," according to a previously secret Justice Department memo released on 24 July 2008. The interrogator's "good faith" and "honest belief" that the interrogation will not cause such suffering protects the interrogator, the memo adds. "Because specific intent is an element of the offense, the absence of specific intent negates the charge of torture," Jay Bybee, then the Assistant Attorney General for the Office of Legal Counsel, wrote in the memo. The 18-page memo is heavily redacted, with 10 its 18 pages completely blacked out and only a few paragraphs legible on the others.

Another memo released on the same day advises that "the waterboard" does "not violate the Torture Statute." It also cites a number of warnings against torture, including statements by President Bush and a then-new Supreme Court ruling "...which raises possible concerns about future U.S. judicial review of the [interrogation] Program."

A third memo instructs interrogators to keep records of sessions that use "enhanced interrogation techniques." The memo is signed by then-CIA director George Tenet and dated January 28, 2003.

The memos were made public by the American Civil Liberties Union, which obtained the three CIA-related documents under Freedom of Information Act requests.

Intentionally causing mental suffering—as well as physical suffering—is prohibited, according to an unclassified analysis written by the U.S. Office of Legal Counsel in December 2004.

==== Authorization and methods of torture and abuse ====
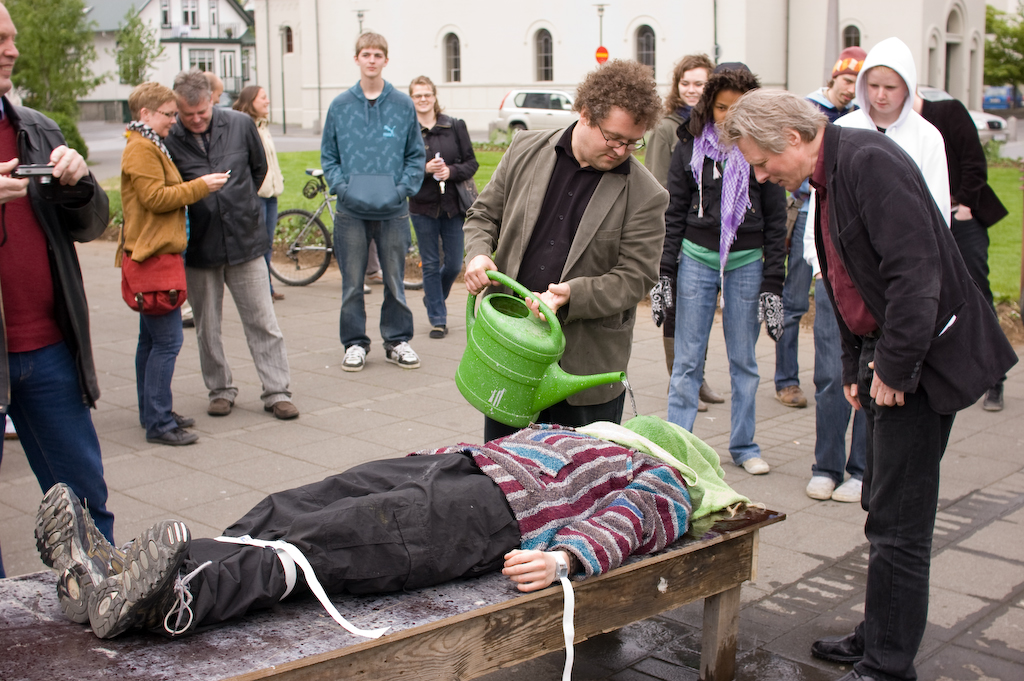
Demonstration of waterboarding at a street protest during a visit by Condoleezza Rice to Iceland, May 2008

The Post article continues that sensory deprivation, through the use of hoods and spraypainted goggles, sleep deprivation, and selective use of painkillers for at least one captive who was shot in the groin during his apprehension are also used. The agents also indicate in the report that the CIA as a matter of course hands suspects over to foreign intelligence services with far fewer qualms about torture for more intensive interrogation. (The act of handing a suspect to another organization or country, where it is foreseeable that torture would occur, is a violation of the Convention Against Torture; see torture by proxy.) The Post reported that one U.S. official said, "If you don't violate someone's human rights some of the time, you probably aren't doing your job."

Based on the Justice Department analyses, Defense Secretary Donald Rumsfeld later approved in 2003 the use of 24 classified interrogation techniques for use on detainees at Guantanamo Bay, which after use on one prisoner were withdrawn. In court filings made public in January 2007, FBI agents reported that detainees at Guantanamo Bay were: chained in a fetal position to the floor for at least 18 hours, urinating and defecating on themselves; subjected to extremes of temperature; gagged with duct tape; held in stress positions while shackled; and subjected to loud music and flashing lights. Senior administration officials have repeatedly denied that torture is being conducted in the detention camps at Guantanamo Bay. However, the Bush administration explicitly endorsed the use of interrogation techniques such as waterboarding in memos to the CIA, and one Pentagon official has publicly admitted that torture was conducted at Guantanamo Bay.

Manfred Nowak, United Nations Special Rapporteur on torture, said that numerous cases of torture ordered by U.S. officials and perpetrated by U.S. authorities are well documented.

We possess all the evidence which proves that the torture methods used in interrogation by the U.S. government were explicitly ordered by former U.S. defence minister Donald Rumsfeld...Obviously, these orders were given with the highest U.S. authorities' knowledge.

Allegations emerged that in the Coalition occupation of Iraq after the second Gulf war, there was extensive use of torture techniques, allegedly supported by American military intelligence agents, in Iraqi jails such as Abu Ghraib and others. In 2004 photos showing humiliation and abuse of prisoners leaked from Abu Ghraib prison, causing a political and media scandal in the U.S. and the whole world.

Condoleezza Rice, Secretary of State ultimately told the CIA the harsher interrogation tactics were acceptable, In 2009 Rice stated, "We never tortured anyone."

On February 14, 2010, in an appearance on ABC's This Week, Vice-president Dick Cheney reiterated his support of waterboarding and enhanced interrogation techniques for captured terrorist suspects, saying, "I was and remain a strong proponent of our enhanced interrogation program."

Pressed by the BBC in 2010 on his personal view of waterboarding, Presidential Advisor Karl Rove said: "I'm proud that we kept the world safer than it was, by the use of these techniques. They're appropriate, they're in conformity with our international requirements and with U.S. law."

=== Secret detention facilities ===
Both United States citizens and foreign nationals are occasionally captured outside of the United States and transferred to secret U.S. administered detention facilities, sometimes being held incommunicado for periods of months or years. Overseas detention facilities are known to be or to have been maintained at least in Thailand, the Philippines, Pakistan, Afghanistan, Uzbekistan, Azerbaijan, Jordan, Egypt, Iraq, Kuwait, UAE, Saudi Arabia, Morocco, Cyprus, Cuba, Diego Garcia, and unspecified South Pacific island nation(s). In addition, individuals are suspected to be or to have been held in temporary or permanent U.S. controlled facilities in Indonesia, El Salvador, Nigeria, Equatorial Guinea, Libya, Israel, Denmark, Poland, Romania, Bulgaria, Albania, Hungary, Germany, and Scotland. There are also allegations that persons categorized as prisoners of war have been tortured, abused or humiliated; or otherwise have had their rights afforded by the Geneva Convention violated.

=== Torture and extraordinary rendition ===
The U.S. and suspected CIA "black sites" Extraordinary renditions allegedly have been carried out from these countries. Detainees have allegedly been transported through these countries. Detainees have allegedly arrived in these countries. Sources: Amnesty International, Human Rights Watch

Extraordinary rendition is the apprehension and extrajudicial transfer of a person from one country to another.

The term "torture by proxy" is used by some critics to describe situations in which the CIA and other U.S. agencies have transferred suspected terrorists to countries known to employ torture, whether they meant to enable torture or not. It has been claimed, though, that torture has been employed with the knowledge or acquiescence of U.S. agencies (a transfer of anyone to anywhere for the purpose of torture is a violation of U.S. law), although Condoleezza Rice (then the United States Secretary of State) stated that:

the United States has not transported anyone, and will not transport anyone, to a country when we believe he will be tortured. Where appropriate, the United States seeks assurances that transferred persons will not be tortured.

Whilst the Obama administration has tried to distance itself from some of the harshest counterterrorism techniques, it has also said that at least some forms of renditions will continue. Currently the administration continues to allow rendition only "to a country with jurisdiction over that individual (for prosecution of that individual)" when there is a diplomatic assurance "that they will not be treated inhumanely."

The U.S. program has also prompted several official investigations in Europe into alleged secret detentions and unlawful inter-state transfers involving Council of Europe member states. A June 2006 report from the Council of Europe estimated 100 people had been kidnapped by the CIA on EU territory (with the cooperation of Council of Europe members), and rendered to other countries, often after having transited through secret detention centres ("black sites") used by the CIA, some located in Europe. According to the separate European Parliament report of February 2007, the CIA has conducted 1,245 flights, many of them to destinations where suspects could face torture, in violation of Article 3 of the United Nations Convention Against Torture.

Following the 11 September 2001 attacks the United States, in particular the CIA, has been accused of rendering hundreds of people suspected by the government of being terrorists—or of aiding and abetting terrorist organizations—to third-party states such as Egypt, Jordan, Morocco, and Uzbekistan. Such "ghost detainees" are kept outside judicial oversight, often without ever entering U.S. territory, and may or may not ultimately be devolved to the custody of the United States.

=== Protests ===
On April 30, 2009, 62 members of Witness Against Torture were arrested at the gates of the White House demanding that the Obama administration support a criminal inquiry into torture under the Bush administration and release innocent detainees still held at Guantanamo. The protesters wearing orange jumpsuits and black hoods, were arrested, and charged with "failure to obey a lawful order" when they refused to leave the White House sidewalk.

Protests have been held regarding the issue of torture and its legality as lately as 2015.

== United Nations Convention Against Torture ==
=== History of U.S. accession ===
The United Nations Convention against Torture and Other Cruel, Inhuman or Degrading Treatment or Punishment (commonly known as the United Nations Convention against Torture) was adopted on 10 December 1984 at the thirty-ninth session of the General Assembly of the United Nations. (Note: The United States was one of the primary sponsors of a Convention to prohibit torture and to protect human rights.Report; See In Matter of J-E, discussed herein.) It was registered, and came into force, on 27 June 1987 in accordance with Article 27(1) of the convention.

The United States signed the Convention in the spring of the following year, officially declaring at the time of its signature on 18 April 1988 that

The Government of the United States of America reserves the right to communicate, upon ratification, such reservations, interpretive understandings, or declarations as are deemed necessary.

Thereafter, the United States formally notified the United Nations and its member states, a few months prior to its ratification, that

...nothing in this Convention requires or authorizes legislation, or other action, by the United States of America prohibited by the Constitution of the United States as interpreted by the United States.

=== Ratification ===
The U.S. ratification itself, on 21 October 1994, came some six years after the spring 1988 signature and was subject to numerous (A) reservations, (B) understandings and (C) declarations. These can be read verbatim at the UN treaty website and are parsed here as follows:

A. Reservations: The U.S. made two reservations in connection with its ratification.

B. Understandings: The U.S. announced certain interpretive understandings, "which shall apply to the obligations of the United States under this Convention:"

(2) Pursuant to treaty option, the U.S. is not bound to resolve questions by international arbitration, but it "reserves the right specifically to agree to follow this or any other procedure for arbitration in a particular case."

(1) Regarding the definition of certain terms in the Convention,

(a) "Torture" (Note: The term "torture" is legally defined in Article 1(1) of the Convention, as follows: "For the purpose of this Convention, the term "torture" means any act by which severe pain or suffering, whether physical or mental, is intentionally inflicted on a person for such purposes as obtaining from him or a third person information or a confession, punishing him for an act he or a third person has committed or is suspected of having committed, or intimidating or coercing him or a third person, or for any reason based on discrimination of any kind, when such pain or suffering is inflicted by or at the instigation of or with the consent or acquiescence of a public official or other person acting in an official capacity. It does not include pain or suffering arising only from, inherent in or incidental to lawful sanctions." However, the U.S. has declared that the convention is not self-executing and therefore the convention's definition does not directly apply in U.S. law. The U.S. has implemented the Convention definition through its Code of Federal Regulations.) must be specifically intended to inflict severe physical or mental pain. Furthermore, "mental pain" refers to prolonged mental harm resulting from either

(1) the intentional infliction of severe physical pain;
(2) the administration of mind altering drugs;
(3) the use of other procedures that are also "calculated to disrupt profoundly the senses or the personality;"
(4) the threat of imminent death; or
(5) the threat that another person (e.g. a spouse or relative) will imminently be subjected to the foregoing.

(b) "Torture" must be an action against a victim in the torturer's custody.

(c) "Sanction" (Note: The term "sanction" is used in Article 1.) includes judicially imposed sanctions and other enforcement actions authorized by United States law or by judicial interpretation of such law.

(d) "Acquiescence" (Note: The term "acquiescence" is used in Article 1.) requires that the public official, prior to the activity constituting torture, be aware that such activity is imminent, thereafter violating his or her duty to prevent such activity.

(e) A non-compliance with applicable legal procedural standards (Note: For instance, a failure to promptly inform a suspect that he has a right to see a lawyer, free of charge if he is indigent.) does not per se constitute torture.

(2) Article 3 forbids deporting a person "where there are substantial grounds for believing that he would be in danger of being subjected to torture." The U.S., attempting to avoid the difficulty of interpreting "substantial grounds for belief," interprets the phrase to mean "if it is more likely than not that he would be tortured." This is essentially the preponderance of evidence test.

(3) Article 14 requires a State Party to provide, in its domestic legal system, a private right of action for damages to victims of torture. The U.S. understands this to apply only for torture committed within territory under the jurisdiction of that State Party.

(4) The U.S. does not consider this Convention to restrict or prohibit the United States from applying the death penalty consistent with the Constitution of the United States.

(5) The Convention will only be implemented by the United States "to the extent that it exercises legislative and judicial jurisdiction over the matters covered by the Convention." In other words, the Convention per se is not U.S. law. By itself, it has no legal effect within the U.S. or upon its representatives. Rather, the Convention imposes an obligation (Note: This "obligation" might itself only be enforceable in the court of world opinion or through United Nations resolution against the US.) on the U.S. to enact and implement such domestic laws as will cause it to come into conformity with the requirements of the Convention. This understanding is echoed in the declaration below.

C. Declarations: The U.S. declared that the provisions of Articles 1 through 16 the Convention are not self-executing.

=== Evidence of violations ===
By transferring military detainees to Iraqi control, the U.S. appears knowingly to have violated the Convention Against Torture. The Convention proscribes signatory states from transferring a detainee to other countries "where there are substantial grounds for believing that he would be in danger of being subjected to torture." The U.S. had received reports of more than a thousand allegations, many of them substantiated by medical evidence, of torture in Iraqi jails. Yet U.S. authorities transferred thousands of prisoners to Iraqi custody, including almost 2,000 who were transferred to the Iraqi government as recently as July 2010.

== U.S. case law on the convention ==
=== Burden of proof ===
In the U.S., an alien seeking protection against deportation under Article 3 of the Convention (Note: Article 3 provides that: 1. No State Party shall expel, return ("refouler") or extradite a person to another State where there are substantial grounds for believing that he would be in danger of being subjected to torture.; 2. For the purpose of determining whether there are such grounds, the competent authorities shall take into account all relevant considerations including, where applicable, the existence in the State concerned of a consistent pattern of gross, flagrant or mass violations of human rights.; As noted, the U.S. opted to interpret the vague language of "substantial grounds" in article 3(1) as synonymous with the preponderance of evidence standard found in the common law; the "preponderance" standard has been subject of ample decided cases in the US, creating plenty of judicial precedent.) must establish that it is more likely than not that he will be tortured in the country of removal. (Note: See Understanding number 2 attached to the U.S. ratification of the Convention, establishing the preponderance of evidence rule for the U.S.) Thus, the alien seeking to stop his deportation bears the burden of proof (or risk of non-persuasion) to show that torture is "more likely than not" to occur in the destination country.

=== In re M-B-A ===
In re M-B-A, a 2002 decision by the Board of Immigration Appeals, concerned a 40-year-old Nigerian woman who was facing a deportation order due to a drug conviction in the U.S. She claimed that if returned to Nigeria, she would be imprisoned and tortured as a result of her U.S. conviction.

In her December 1999 hearing before the immigration judge, she presented evidence of Nigeria's Decree No. 33, which authorized imprisonment in her situation. When asked how she knew she would be tortured, she said that some years ago, she had spoken with a Nigerian friend, (Note: She suggested that she had spoken to this person by telephone sometime in 1995, more than four years before she was giving her testimony.) who had been convicted of a U.S. drug offense and then returned to Nigeria in 1995. The friend had told her that her family had to bring money to the jail for protection, that she slept on the floor and that "you probably get raped" by the guards because they have authority to do "whatever they can do." The friend remained in jail for two months until the family paid a bribe. M-B-A did not know if the friend had seen a judge before being incarcerated, or if the friend had been raped in the prison.

M-B-A also presented evidence that she had a chronic ulcer, asthma and suffered from depression; that she was on medication but had no one to help her with medicine if she ended up in jail; that her father was deceased and her mother lived in the UK and that she had no relations to help her in Nigeria, aside from an uncle who had sexually abused her as a child. She claimed she would be beaten and raped in prison by the guards and that most women suffered this treatment, and that her ex-fiancé (who lived in Nigeria) would bribe prison guards to beat her.

The full Board of Appeals (Note: The Board consists of up to fifteen immigration law specialists, who sit as immigration appellate administrative law judges. The Board is a part of the executive branch of the U.S. Government, rather than the judicial branch; it is not an "Article III" court under the U.S. Constitution, but rather a type of administrative court within the executive branch. Its decisions are subject to appeal to a U.S. Court of Appeals.) considered the question of whether M-B-A had carried her burden of proof in showing that it was more likely than not that she would be tortured by a public official upon her return to Nigeria.

In a close 7-6 decision, the Board found that M-B-A had not demonstrated that it was more likely than not that she would be imprisoned in Nigeria on the basis of Decree 33. She did not present any evidence on the question of the extent to which the Decree was enforced, or against whom it was enforced. Her own evidence about enforcement was either (a) her own speculation or (b) based on the conversation with her friend's experience during a different Nigerian regime. (Note: In May 1999 the military regime in Nigeria was replaced with a civilian regime under President Obasanjo. Note 2 of decision.) The Board stated

she has [not] met her burden of [establishing] that it is more likely than not that her return to Nigeria would result in her detention or imprisonment. . . . [She] must provide some current evidence, or at least more meaningful historical evidence, regarding . . . enforcement of Decree 33 on individuals similarly situation to herself. . . . [Her] case is based on a chain of assumptions and a fear of what might happen, rather than . . . demonstrating that it is more likely than not that she will be subjected to torture. . . .

Accordingly, the BIA held that M-B-A should be deported.

There were two separate dissenting opinions, (Note: A total of six judges dissented, four of them joining in one of the dissenting opinions.) both of which agreed with the enunciated standard of proof to be used ("more likely than not"), but disagreed over the question of whether the burden had been met by M-B-A. Judge Schmidt's dissent cited the U.S. State Department's report on Nigeria's prison system, reported that one area of abuse in Nigerian prison was the intentional withholding of medical aid or medication. He found on the basis of this report that such withholding (for purposes of e.g. gaining bribes or inflicting punishment) was common in Nigeria and that death from such actions was common. He did not, however, address the majority's assertion that M-B-A had failed to establish, by a preponderance of the evidence, that she would be imprisoned in the first place under Decree No. 33, apparently taking this for granted. (Note: The majority decision does not address the question of the likelihood of torture within prison; instead, it finds that M-B-A did not show, by the required evidence standard, that she would be imprisoned at all, which rendered the question of treatment within prison as moot.)

=== Defining "torture" ===
"Torture" within the meaning of the convention (and 8 Code of Federal Regulations, Section 208.18) is an extreme form of cruel and inhuman treatment and does not extend to lesser forms of cruel, inhuman, or degrading treatment or punishment. (Note: This does not imply that such "lesser" forms can be committed by governments with impunity. Article 16 the Convention, for example, imposes on each State Party an obligation to try to prevent such "lesser" forms of cruel treatment, even though they do not rise to the level of torture. But only such severe actions that do rise to the level of "torture" are grounds for preventing deportation under the terms of Article 3 of the Convention.)

For an act to constitute "torture" it must satisfy each of the following five elements in the definition of torture:

- the act must cause severe physical or mental pain or suffering
- the act must be intentionally inflicted
- the act must be inflicted for a proscribed purpose
- the act must be inflicted by (or at the instigation of or with the consent or acquiescence of) a public official who has custody of the victim
- the act cannot arise from lawful sanctions

=== Matter of J-E ===
In the U.S. immigration case of Matter of J-E-, 23 I&N December 291 (BIA 2002)(ID 3466), the indefinite detention of criminal deportees by Haitian authorities did not constitute "torture" where there was no evidence that the authorities intentionally and deliberately detained deportees in order to inflict torture. Likewise, substandard prison conditions in Haiti did not constitute "torture" where there is no evidence that the authorities intentionally created and maintained such conditions in order to inflict torture.

J-E was a Haitian who had entered the U.S. illegally and who was later convicted of selling cocaine. The Government sought to deport him, but J-E claimed that he would be imprisoned and tortured if he were returned to Haiti. Therefore, he argued, Article 3 of the Convention prevented his being deported. The Board set out the five-part test for torture and noted that

While the Convention Against Torture makes a clear distinction between torturous and non torturous acts, actually differentiating between acts of torture and other bad acts is not so obvious. Although not binding on the United States, the opinions of other governmental bodies adjudicating torture claims can be instructive.

The Board thereupon considered Ireland v. United Kingdom, 2 Eur. Ct. H.R. 25 (1978), where the European Court of Human Rights held that suspected IRA members who were subjected to wall standing, hooding, a constant loud and hissing noise in addition to being deprived of sleep, food and drink were subjected to "inhuman and degrading treatment" but not to "torture".

It was admitted by all parties that J-E would be indefinitely detained upon return to Haiti. Deportees were held by police in holding cells for weeks before release. However, the State Department report (relied upon by all parties) confirmed that the Haitian government used this policy as a warning and a deterrent, to try to prevent deportees from committing crimes in Haiti.

Thus, Haiti's detention policy in itself appears to be a lawful enforcement sanction ... to protect the populace from criminal acts by Haitians who are forced to return to the country after having been convicted of crimes abroad. ... this policy is a lawful sanction and, therefore, does not constitute torture. ... [Also] there is no evidence that Haitian authorities are detaining criminal deportees with the specific intent to inflict severe physical or mental pain or suffering. Nor is there evidence that the procedure is inflicted on criminal deportees for a proscribed purpose, such as obtaining information or a confession. ... Haiti's detention practice alone does not constitute torture within the meaning of the regulations.

J-E contended that in any case, the combination of indefinite detention with the admittedly substandard conditions of Haitian prison constitute torture. However, the Board noted that the Convention required that "torture" required a "specific intent" by the accused country in order for torture to result:

Although Haitian authorities are intentionally detaining criminal deportees knowing that the detention facilities are substandard, there is no evidence that they are intentionally and deliberately creating and maintaining such prison conditions in order to inflict torture. ... the Haitian prison conditions are the result of budgetary and management problems as well as the country's severe economic difficulties. ... there is no effective delivery system [for food]... we cannot find that these inexcusable prison conditions constitute torture within the meaning of the regulatory definition.

Finally, J-E maintained that mistreatment was common in Haitian prison and that he would be subjected to such mistreatment, and that constituted torture. The Board found that there was, in Haiti,

Beating with fists, sticks and belts ... by far the most common form of abuse. However [there are] other forms of mistreatment, such as burning with cigarettes, choking, hooding and ... severe boxing of the ears, which can result in eardrum damage. ... there were also isolated allegations of electric shock ...[and] withholding medical treatment.

The Board considered all the evidence submitted and concluded that it showed that isolated incidents of torture did occur in Haitian detention facilities. However, this evidence was not sufficient to demonstrate that it was more likely than not that J-E would be subjected to torture upon his detention. There was no evidence that the torture was persistent or widespread; or that the Haitian government used torture as a policy; or that there was no meaningful international oversight. (Note: The Board noted that the Haitian government cooperated with the Red Cross in delivering aid and allowed a Miami Herald reporter access to the prisons (part of the newspaper story was used by J-E as his evidence in the hearing). Furthermore, the U.S. had urged the Haitian government to discontinue the indefinite detention practice and the President of Haiti had visited jails and had pardoned several women there, due to the awful conditions.)

The Board accordingly held in yet another 7–6 opinion with substantial dissenting opinions—that J-E had failed to carry his burden of showing that the admitted mistreatment was so pervasive that it therefore was more likely than not that he would be tortured in a Haitian jail, as opposed to being subjected to cruel and inhuman acts that, while despicable, were less than torture within the meaning of the applicable law. Most of the actions reported against Haiti, the Board decided, were sanctioned under Article 16 the convention as acts that were "cruel and inhuman" and that State Parties were obliged to correct, but nevertheless did not constitute "torture" within the meaning of Article 1 of the convention.

J-E's appeal to the BIA was therefore dismissed and the deportation order remained in effect.

== See also ==
- Abu Ghraib torture and prisoner abuse
- At the Center of the Storm book by former CIA head George Tenet
- Human Rights Record of the United States
- International humanitarian law
- Lexical definition
- Precising definition
- Torture Memos (2002), drafted by John Yoo
- Universal jurisdiction
- Use of torture since 1948
- Water cure (torture)#Philippine-American War

Other human rights issues in the United States

- Tramp chair, 19th-century torture device used by American police
- United States war crimes
- United States and state terrorism
- United States and state-sponsored terrorism
- Unethical human experimentation in the United States

== Notes ==
Footnotes
