= Dianna Ortiz =

American nun and missionary (1958–2021)

- Born: Diana Mae Ortiz; September 2, 1958; Colorado Springs, Colorado, U.S.
- Died: February 19, 2021 (aged 62); Washington, D.C.
- Occupation: Roman Catholic sister

Dianna Mae Ortiz (September 2, 1958 – February 19, 2021) was an American Roman Catholic sister of the Ursuline order. While serving as a missionary in Guatemala, during its civil war, she was abducted on November 2, 1989 by members of the Guatemalan military, detained, raped, and tortured for 24 hours before being released. After her release, Ortiz reported that an American was among her captors. This part of her account could not be confirmed.

Ortiz pursued her case in a Guatemalan court and in a United States civil court. In the latter, she was the first to seek civil damages under the Torture Victim Protection Act passed in 1992. She filed a case against the Guatemalan Minister of Defense, General Héctor Gramajo, who was in power at the time of her abduction, arguing that he had command authority. In 1995, she was awarded $5 million in damages. She also filed a case with the Inter-American Commission of Human Rights.

In 1996, as a result of protests by Ortiz and others, as well as revelations of unauthorized CIA funding of the Guatemala military which had been prohibited by Congress in 1990, U.S. President Bill Clinton ordered the release of CIA papers associated with her case. Clinton also ordered the declassification of decades of documents related to U.S. relations with Guatemala. These showed that a Guatemalan colonel paid by the CIA was implicated in the deaths of the American Michael DeVine in 1990 and guerrilla leader Efraín Bámaca Velásquez in 1993. Congress closed down the CIA program.

The Center for Constitutional Rights represented Ortiz in her civil case and before the Inter-American Commission of Human Rights, which found in 1997 that the State of Guatemala had violated numerous articles of the American Convention on Human Rights in regard to Ortiz. It recommended that the government complete its long-delayed investigation and that it provide compensation to Ortiz.

== Early life and education ==
Ortiz was born on September 2, 1958, in Colorado Springs, Colorado, the middle of eight children born to Ambrosia and Pilar Ortiz, a homemaker and uranium miner, respectively. Wanting the religious life from the time she was a child, Dianna entered the novitiate at age 17 at the Ursuline Sisters of Mount St. Joseph in Maple Mount, western Kentucky. Upon completion, she was accepted as a sister of the Ursuline Order.

Dianna attended San Jose Elementary School and Sierra Vista Elementary School. For high school, she spent her freshman, sophomore, and junior years at Grants High School in New Mexico, while ending her senior year at Mount Saint Joseph Academy. In Ursuline, she taught children while being very young herself. Sister Dianna worked at the Ursuline Order for 43 years. Her parents were immigrants from Mexico and they spoke Spanish; eventually, through them, she learned to speak Spanish. Her father worked as a miner, while her mother worked around the house.

== Career ==
As a Catholic sister, Ortiz went to Guatemala in the 1987 for a two-year assignment to work with the poor and teach children to read. She joined sisters already working with the indigenous population in San Miguel Acatán and other small villages throughout the department of Huehuetenango. According to her account, in late 1988 the Bishop of Huehuetenango received an anonymous typed document accusing Ortiz and the other sisters in San Miguel of planning to meet with "subversives". This was followed in 1989 by written anonymous threats directed and delivered to Ortiz personally, while she was staying in more than one location, showing that she was under continued surveillance. In October 1989, she went to the retreat center of Posada de Belen in Antigua, Guatemala.

== Abduction and torture ==
Ortiz was abducted on November 2, 1989, from the garden of Posada de Belen. She said her captors were police officers who took her to a secret prison at a police academy (later identified as the Antigua Escuela Politécnica) in Guatemala City. There she was tortured and raped repeatedly under questioning.

Before being abducted and following her transfer from the Ursuline convent to Guatemala, Ortiz started getting death threats. In addition to being raped, and tortured repeatedly, Ortiz was forced to torture and stab another victim to death with a machete.

She said a man named Alejandro was among her torturers, and that she heard him speak English with a North American accent. She wrote in her memoir that her torture stopped

when a man with an American accent entered the room and said in English, "Shit." Then he said, in Spanish, to the torturers, "You idiots! Leave her alone. She's a North American, and it's all over the news." To Ortiz he said, "You have to forgive those guys, ... they made a mistake.

He was taking her to a friend (to be taken to the American embassy) when she escaped. She said he told her she had been mistaken for a guerrilla with a similar name, Verónica Ortiz Hernández. Ortiz knew this woman, an indigenous Guatemalan, and said she did not resemble her. When she questioned him about that, she said that Alejandro "insinuated that I was to blame for my torture because I had not heeded the threats that were sent to me." She returned to the U.S. from Guatemala within 48 hours of her escape.

After being released, Ortiz later said:

The nightmare I lived was nothing out of the ordinary. In 1989, under Guatemala's first civilian president in years, nearly two hundred people were abducted. Unlike me, they were "disappeared, gone forever". The only uncommon element of my ordeal was that I survived, probably because I was a U.S. citizen, and phone calls poured into Congress when I was reported missing. As a U.S. citizen, I had another advantage: I could, in relative safety, reveal afterwards the details of what happened to me in those twenty-four hours. One of those details: an American was in charge of my torturers.

She saw a doctor in Guatemala and another after she returned to the United States; both later submitted testimony that she showed evidence of torture, including extensive cigarette burns. Ortiz suffered greatly from her experience; like other torture victims, she lost many of her memories from the period before she went to Guatemala. After returning to the U.S., she had to be reintroduced to her family. It took her a long time to rebuild her trust in people. In addition, she later recounted, she learned she was pregnant from the rapes. Overwhelmed by the treatment she had received, she got an abortion. This added to her survivor's guilt and emotional burden. Ortiz was placed in a Catholic psychiatric asylum, where she would be under intense care. Under psychiatric care, she would become friends with another patient who would be influential in her recovery.

== Guatemala's Civil War ==
When Ortiz's abduction took place, Guatemala was experiencing a civil war that lasted 36 years since the early 1960s and mostly targeted Mayan people. The war was a conflict between right-wing politicians and communist movements. At the time the civil war began, Guatemala was under General Miguel Ydigoras Fuentes' rule. Roughly 200,000 people were killed during these events, and 83 percent of them were Mayans – these civilians had been violated by the government and armed forces. Individuals and villages from socioeconomic backgrounds were also wiped out due to large massacres that were a result of government repression.

The United States intervened on behalf of Guatemala when the military forces there were abusing a number of human rights at the time of Ortiz's kidnapping. The United States trained "officers in counterinsurgency techniques and assisted the national intelligence apparatus". The methods employed by the military and administration of Guatemala made it possible for Ortiz to be kidnapped. Guatemala committed crimes, kidnappings, and brutal techniques without claiming accountability.

In 1977 the U.S. stopped providing military funding due to the human rights issues. Congress also imposed "imposing restrictions on military aid, citing human rights violations".

== U.S. and Guatemala official denials of involvement ==
According to a Salon reviewer of Ortiz's 2002 memoir, "federal investigators and State Department officials made an active effort to cover up her ordeal and to discredit her – understandably, as the United States is the major source of funding for the Guatemalan military."

Former U.S. ambassador to Guatemala Thomas F. Stroock (1989–1992) said in 1995 that Ortiz's claims amounted to an allegation of U.S. involvement in her torture, which he denied. He said it was done by right-wing paramilitary forces in the country.

The U.S government claimed that the allegations were false, stating that "items which were later found were intentionally placed in the garden to provide greater realism to the story of the kidnapping". Ortiz also explicitly mentions that General Héctor Gramajo, and General Carlos Morales told press that her abduction was a hoax. General Héctor Gramajo, the Chief of Staff of the Army, oversaw the troops who tortured and kidnapped Ortiz. In order to obscure their actions, they reported that Ortiz's injuries were caused by a "lesbian love tryst". President George W. Bush of the United States, took part in the denial that the Guatemalan military was involved in the crime in order to preserve their relationships with the military there. Guatemalan military was protected under US law and worked for the US government.

Despite the denials, the Commission, also known as the Inter-American Commission on Human Rights, ruled that Ortiz was telling the truth and that all of the accusations made against the Guatemalan military were legitimate. The administration was held accountable for the atrocities perpetrated against Ortiz since they linked more violent activities on behalf of Guatemalan citizens to officials in the government.

Ortiz eventually won her case against General Héctor Gramajo and it was ruled that he would never be allowed to enter the U.S.

== Guatemalan media lobby ==
In a 1996 widely recounted interview with Ortiz on the TV news program Nightline, American journalist Cokie Roberts contested Ortiz's claim that an American was among her captors. Roberts implied that Ortiz was lying about the entire episode, despite the fact that Ortiz later won a lawsuit against a Guatemalan general she accused in the case. It was later revealed that Patton Boggs, the law firm of Roberts' brother Tom Boggs, was paid by the Guatemalan government to promote a more positive image of the regime, which was widely criticized internationally for human rights abuses. Patton Boggs ran a smear campaign against Ortiz.

According to an article on Pamela Brogan's report The Torturers' Lobby (1993), published by the Center for Public Integrity (CPI), Guatemala was among several nations known to commit torture and human rights abuses and that had paid U.S. lobbying firms high fees to help keep U.S. funds going to it and "to gloss over its wretched human rights reputation". For instance, in 1991, the major lobbying firm of Patton, Boggs, & Blow in Washington, DC, was paid $220,000 by Guatemala. Based on the CPI report, Clinton prohibited any member of his administration from representing foreign governments after leaving the federal government. (It is generally common practice for political appointees to work later for lobbying firms to capitalize on their connections.)

In June 1990, Michael DeVine, an American innkeeper who had been living and working in Guatemala for 20 years, was found killed. The U.S. pressed the Guatemalan government to solve his murder; when that did not happen by the end of the year, Congress prohibited more military funding, then worth about $2.8 million.

== Ortiz hunger strike ==
In April 1996, Ortiz was fasting outside the White House and joined by other protesters; she was seeking a release of CIA papers related to her abduction and the U.S. government's investigation. Her protests had been preceded by those of Jennifer Harbury and members of the Guatemala Human Rights Commission, seeking U.S. action on learning the fates of many "disappeared" in the country. Harbury's husband Efraín Bámaca Velásquez, a Mayan guerrilla leader, had "disappeared" in 1992 and was presumed dead.

She went on a five-week hunger strike in protest. In order to prevent her torturers from harming another person in Guatemala, Ortiz intended to gather as much information as possible about her situation and them. Ortiz anticipated being the voice for others who could not openly comment on human rights abuses because they sought political refuge, despite dropping 10 pounds over the first three weeks of the hunger strike.

Numerous CIA papers were released in May 1996. While there was no confirmation of Ortiz's claim that an American national had been directly involved in her case, the papers revealed that a Guatemalan colonel on the CIA payroll ordered the 1990 killing of DeVine and the 1993 murder of Bámaca Velásquez by a death squad.

As a result of revelations, Clinton ordered the United States Intelligence Oversight Board to conduct a year-long review of operations of the CIA in Guatemala. Its 1996 report included a review of Ortiz's case but reserved its conclusions:

[T]he IOB believes that Sister Dianna was subjected to horrific abuse on November 2, 1989, but U.S. intelligence reports provide little insight into the details of her plight. Because the Department of Justice is still conducting an extensive reinvestigation of the incident, we do not draw any conclusions on the case at this time.

Despite the lack of compliance from government officials, the First Lady Hillary Clinton, had sympathy for Ortiz and greatly assisted in providing official documents and identification related to her case. Richard Nuccio, a State Department analyst, told a Congressional contact that the CIA had been funding Guatemala military operations, despite the 1990 prohibition. As a result, Clinton ordered declassification of records going back to 1954 (when a CIA-sponsored military coup overthrew the government). Analysis has revealed longstanding U.S. support for the Guatemala military through its years of state terrorism and civil war.

== Prosecution of her case ==
Sister Dianna filed a case with the Inter-American Commission on Human Rights in 1990 based on her abduction and torture by agents of the Guatemalan government in 1989. The commission ruled in 1997 that the state of Guatemala had violated Articles 1, 5, 7, 8, 11, 12, 16 and 25 of the American Convention on Human Rights. It found that Ortiz had been placed under surveillance, was threatened, then kidnapped and tortured. It made a judgment against the state of Guatemala, with remedies suggested. It noted that a domestic case had quickly been filed with the National Police in the department where the sisters were working, and that Ortiz had cooperated with the investigation, but in six years the government had made no progress on it. The commission noted that high-ranking officials of the National Police, Ministry of Interior and Ministry of Defense had immediately denied Ortiz's statement and tried to denigrate her account before any investigation was done.

Given the difficulty of victims prosecuting torture and human rights cases, including murders, under military dictatorships, plaintiffs have begun to pursue civil suits. The first were filed under the Alien Tort Claims Act (ATCA), which had been passed soon after the American Revolutionary War to deal with commercial issues. In the late twentieth century, this law began to be used in human rights cases.

Trying to enable victims' seeking justice after not being able to gain it in countries that used torture, Congress passed the Torture Victim Protection Act (1992). Ortiz was the first to file a suit under this law, arguing that it was retroactive to the time of her torture. The court agreed, saying "torture had been universally condemned prior to Ortiz's ordeal."

The civil case of Ortiz was combined by her legal representative, the Center for Constitutional Rights, with Xuncax v. Gramajo, in which eight Kanjobal Indians had filed a U.S. civil suit against General Héctor Gramajo, Minister of Defense in Guatemala (1987-1990) under the Alien Tort Claims Act (ATCA). They contended that he had command responsibility for the genocide against the Maya, which resulted in the deaths of most people in their village, as well as responsibility for other abuses. Their case was heard in federal court in Massachusetts in combination with Ortiz v. Gramajo, which was decided under the Torture Victim Protection Act (1992), the first to make use of the new law.

The Center for Constitutional Rights filed against Gramajo when he was in Massachusetts doing graduate work at the Harvard Kennedy School of Government. The ATCA "allows Americans and foreigners to file suit for violations of international law while the defendant is in the United States". The court agreed with the plaintiffs on Gramajo's responsibility, saying the former general "devised and directed the implementation of an indiscriminate campaign of terror against civilians", including the nine plaintiffs. The judge ordered Gramajo to pay each of the Guatemalans $1 to $9 million each, and Ortiz $5 million. The general said he had no money. Later that year, he was barred from future entry into the U.S. under immigration laws.

"The Xuncax court also added summary execution or extrajudicial execution and arbitrary detention (as differentiated from prolonged arbitrary detention) to the list of torts cognizable under the ATCA. "Numerous other cases have now reaffirmed the responsibility and civil liability of commanders and those in authority for the actions of their troops and subordinates."

In its ruling, the judiciary said that "[Gramajo-Morales] ... was aware of and supported widespread acts of brutality committed under his command resulting in thousands of civilian deaths."

Ortiz recounted her experience in formal testimony several times.

Raul Molina Mejía in his article, "The Struggle against Impunity in Guatemala", Journal of Social Justice, vol. 26 (1999), describes Ortiz's abduction and treatment as an example of state-sponsored terrorism based on impunity. He writes: "impunity as concrete legal or 'de facto' actions taken by powerful sectors to prevent investigation or prosecution, such as amnesty laws, pardons, thwarting investigations, the hiding of documents, and tampering with legal samples were abundant in Guatemala." He also notes the unsolved killing of Michael DeVine, the El Aguacate massacre, and the 1990 surge of killings at the National University of San Carlos. Molina Mejía writes that the "political/psychological" aspect of this impunity, is "a dimension resulting from state terrorism, by which political options in a polity are restricted and controlled through the state's manipulation of fear".

== Human rights work ==
In 1994, Dianna Ortiz began working at the Guatemala Human Rights Commission/USA (GHRC). GHRC's director, Sister Alice Zachmann, had advocated for her release from clandestine detention in 1989 and had invited Dianna to give the keynote address at GHRC's 1992 International Conference on Torture in Guatemala. Dianna's work at GHRC involved advocacy work, public speaking, and help with all aspects of the small organization. While at GHRC, Dianna conducted her hunger strike and vigil in front of the White House.

In 1998, while working at the Guatemala Human Rights Commission/USA, Ortiz founded the Torture Abolition and Survivors Support Coalition International (TASSC) as a project of GHRC/USA. TASSC received its 501(c)3 status in 2002, becoming the only organization in the U.S. founded by and for survivors of torture. It provides support particularly to survivors living in the U.S., as many refugees had come from nations in Central and South America where states had sponsored terrorism against citizens.

TASSC was founded as a pledge from Ortiz to the public that she would work to stop others from going through similar challenging circumstances. Her experiences prompted her to seek justice for herself and others in the midst of the political violence.

During the 2000s, TASSC became involved in issues related to treatment of detainees at the U.S. base of Guantanamo, where reports of torture had been made. In addition, TASSC tried to gain repeal of the Military Commissions Act of 2006, by which Congress authorized a system outside the U.S.'s existing civilian and military justice systems to prosecute detainees being held at Guantanamo. Congress approved this legislation after the U.S. Supreme Court held that the George W. Bush administration's military commissions, set up only under executive branch authority, were unconstitutional.

"TASSC is unique in the United States as the only organization led by torture survivors themselves, operating from the core belief that survivors understand their needs best and must be at the core of decisions about the healing process". After speaking with and interviewing torture victims all across the world, Ortiz was inspired and felt driven to start an advocacy organization. TASSC increased the access of resources for survivors despite the increasing number of torture survivors across Latin America and the United States.

== Death ==
Dianna Ortiz died of cancer on February 19, 2021, while under hospice care in Washington, D.C.
