= Bandes =

Bandes may refer to:

- BANDES, The Venezuelan Economic and Social Development Bank
- Susan Bandes, American lawyer
- Efim Samuilovich Bandes (1866–1927), Russian-Jewish political activist, known in the United States as Louis Miller
