= Communities of People in Resistance =

Communities

- Founded: 1980
- Type: Civilian subsistence organization
- Legal status: Inactive
- Location: El Quiché, Guatemala
- Members: Peasant communities in Ixcán and the Sierra en El Quiché, Guatemala

The Communities of People in Resistance (in Spanish, known as Comunidades de Población en Resistencia, or by the acronym CPRs) were the communities uprooted by the Guatemalan Civil War (1960-1996) that were isolated in the jungles and mountains of Ixcán, in the department of El Quiché, since the early 1980s and reappeared in the public light in 1991.

== History ==
No sector was more affected by violence during the years of the Guatemalan Civil War than the country's peasant population. The war left unprecedented death and destruction throughout the countryside, generating, among other reactions, the massive flight of thousands of Guatemalan peasants. In the period 1981–82, in which more than four hundred towns and villages were razed and thousands of Guatemalans killed, the reaction of the survivors caught between the two forces was to flee, put themselves under the control of the Guatemalan Army and be forced to participate in the Civil Defense Patrols (PAC), or be relocated to the "model villages" where they were concentrated. Some fifty thousand totally dispossessed people escaped to jungle areas of El Quiché, spending those years hidden from the outside world and out of government control.

A decade later, about half were still there, although the Army's offensives between 1987 and 1989 drove some 5,000 people out. Later others settled on their own outside the CPRs, north of Uspantán. In mid-1992, there were about seventeen thousand inhabitants of the Sierra CPRs and about six thousand in Ixcán, or a total of approximately twenty-three thousand people.

The CPRs of Ixcán were made up of mostly Kʼicheʼ people, while in the Sierra communities they were mostly Ixil people, as well as Ladino people. The communities visited highlighted the coexistence on an equal footing of its members from all backgrounds.

During 1992 and 1993, numerous national and international observers visited the CPRs in both the Sierra and Ixcán, indicating that "they were unarmed civilians living in great poverty and who could barely survive by planting corn, beans, and raising farm animals. "

— Christian Tomuschat
United Nations Independent Expert for Guatemala and member of the Historical Clarification Commission

In January 1994, the CPRs of Ixcán made public their intention to settle peacefully from February 2 in their previous locations between the Ixcán and Xalbal rivers on the lands of the Ixcán Grande Cooperative, whose members are mostly members of the CPR, and invited the Inter-American Commission on Human Rights to monitor the situation. On March 9 and 10, 1994, the Quiché CPRs were visited by members of the Ibero-American Commission on Human Rights (IDEH); the communities visited were Santiaguito, San Luis, San Francisco, Los Altos and La Esperanza, (Ixcán) and the CPRs in Cabá and Santa Clara (Sierra). The commission also visited nearby towns in Centro Veracruz, (Ixcán) and Asunción del Copón (Sierra), as well as some of the CPR's workers and interviewed military patrols operating in those territories. During these trips, the Delegation was also able to observe other populations in the area, as well as the various barracks that were abandoned by the Army.

== Lost communities ==
The lost communities were spontaneous isolated communities, which were outside the CPR system but close to them in practically isolated areas of El Quiché and Alta Verapaz, and which were in terrible living conditions. These populations consciously decided to relocate to remote areas not affected by the insurgency and to develop their lives beyond the reach of the various armed groups, developing a subsistence economy and avoiding drawing public attention. Some of the families that comprised them have been part of the CPR in the past and decided to relocate outside the conflict zone. These isolated communities were located in the Uspantán area, where there were between sixty and ninety communities of this type with a population that varied between thirty and fifty families each; and in Alta Verapaz in the Ochabal, Chisec and Sejalaute area.

== Discovery of oil in the CPR regions ==
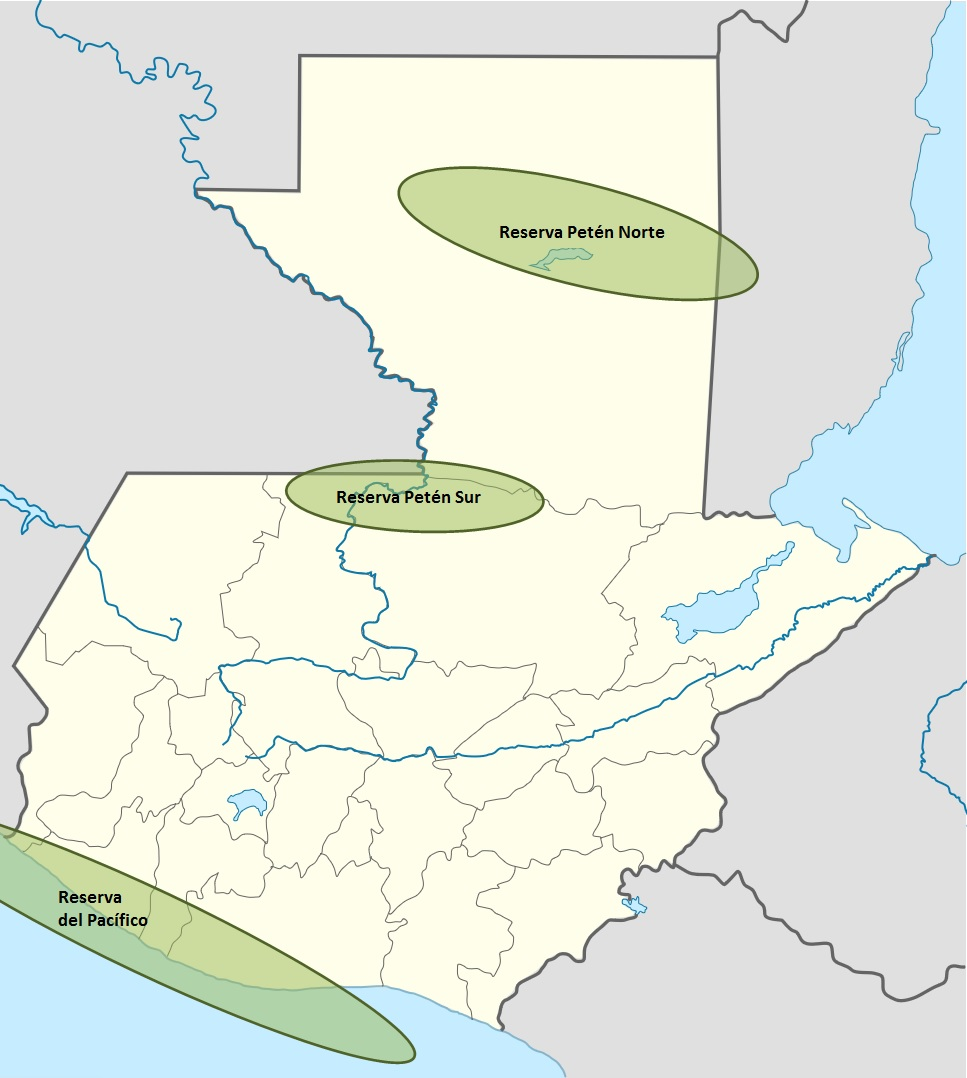
Oil reserves of Guatemala.

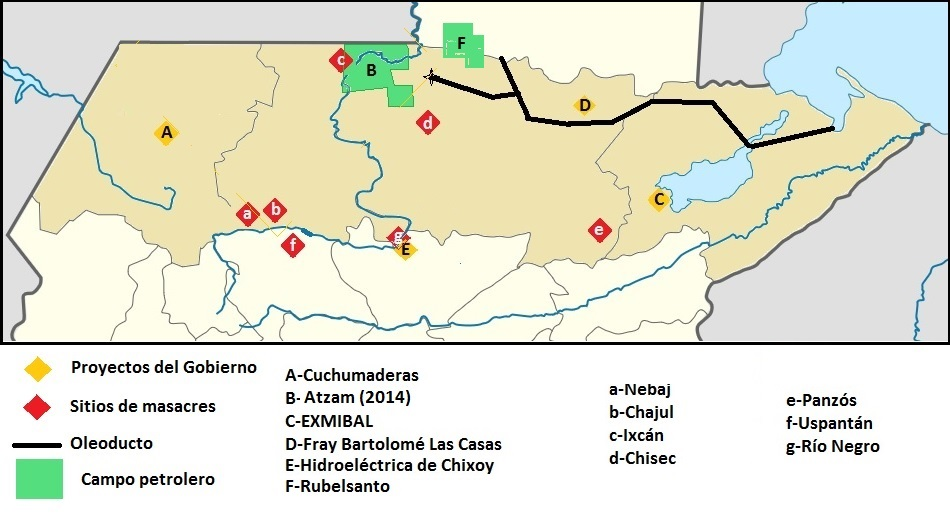
Map showing the location of the most important projects that the Guatemalan government was executing in the Northern Transversal Strip, and the places where massacres occurred in the same region.

In 1971, the Qʼeqchiʼ indigenous people were evicted from the area around Cancuén, because it was considered to have oil; the army was used to evict 24 villages from the area.

Since 1974, crude oil had been commercially exploited in the vicinity of the Northern Transversal Strip (FTN) as a result of the discoveries made by the oil companies Basic Resources and Shenandoah Oil, which jointly operated in the Rubelsanto oil field in Alta Verapaz. In 1976, when President Kjell Eugenio Laugerud García came to visit the Mayalán cooperative in the Ixcán sector - which had been first populated just ten years earlier - he said: "Mayalán is sitting on top of gold", hinting that the Northern Transversal Strip would no longer be dedicated to agriculture or the cooperative movement, but would instead be used for strategic objectives of natural resource exploitation. After that presidential visit, both oil companies carried out explorations in the lands of Xalbal, very close to Mayalán in Ixcán, where they drilled the “San Lucas” well with unsuccessful results. Those explorations, which opened the way for future oil experiments in Ixcán, and the rest of the FTN, were also the main reason for the construction of a dirt road that runs through the Strip. Shenandoah Oil, the National Institute of Agrarian Transformation (INTA) and the Army Engineers Battalion coordinated to build that corridor between 1975 and 1979, which ultimately allowed powerful politicians, military and businessmen of the time to take over many of the lands where the potential timber and oil wealth lay.

Senior Guatemalan officials then became large landowners and investors, taking advantage of the migration of peasants, access to privileged information, expansion of public credit, and large development projects; the army even entered the business world, launching the Army Bank. After the civil war, the FTN was abandoned, but oil exploration continued.
