= TASSC =

TASSC may refer to:

- The Advancement of Sound Science Coalition
- Torture Abolition and Survivors Support Coalition
