= Kayla Williams =

Kayla Williams may refer to:

- Kayla Williams (author) (born 1976), U.S. Army linguist
- Kayla Williams (gymnast) (born 1993), American gymnast
