= Tramp chair =

Device used to restrain, torture and humiliate prisoners

The tramp chair was a one-person restraining device used by American police, largely during the 19th century, as a form of torture and public humiliation.

Invented in the early 19th century, the tramp chair was a cage made of bent and riveted metal straps in the shape of a chair. An individual could be placed inside the chair and locked up securely, the chair thus acting as a jail cell, particularly in towns too small to build a jail. It was sometimes placed on a wheeled platform so it could be moved around easily.

As its name suggests, the tramp chair was often used for vagrants who could be left inside it for a day or two as encouragement to move along. Made of iron, it would heat up or cool down uncomfortably depending on the weather, and town residents could jeer at and harass the occupant. It left no room to move around, so it would be very uncomfortable to sit in for a prolonged stretch of time. The American Police Hall of Fame and Police Museum in Miami states that "often the prisoner was stripped naked and the kids from the area would poke him with sticks."

The tramp chair was invented and made by Sanford Baker of Oakland, Maine. An original chair is in the Smithsonian and another is in the Bangor (Maine) Police Museum.

The first person known to escape from this device was escapologist Theodore Hardeen, the brother of Harry Houdini.

== See also ==
- Torture in the United States#Domestic police and prisons
