= Civil Defense Patrols =

- Patrullas de Autodefensa Civil
- Dates active: 1 August 1982 – 29 December 1996
- Active regions: Guatemala
- Size: 1,000,000
- Wars: Guatemalan Civil War

The Civil Defense Patrols (Spanish: Patrullas de Autodefensa Civil, PAC) were local militias created by the government of Guatemala during the Guatemalan Civil War. They were created by decree of General Ríos Montt on 1 August 1982, though they began before that under President Fernando Romeo Lucas García. Officially, participation was voluntary, but many were forced to join. The patrols officially stopped 29 December 1996 under the terms of the peace treaty that ended the war, though some of the network remained and was used by former members demanding compensation for their involvement. Estimates vary, but statistics generally state that around 1,000,000 people were members of the patrols at the height of the war in 1983. The members tortured and killed other villagers, sometimes at the threat of being killed themselves.

== Overview ==
The primary goals of Guatemala's Civil Defense Patrols included augmenting the army's military strength and intelligence in areas of conflict and providing vigilance and control of the local organization. It is their duty to protect the areas in and around the town perimeters specifically by controlling the comings and goings of the Inhabitants and passing strangers. Specifically, the Civil Defense Patrols were local militias created by the government of Guatemala during the Guatemalan Civil War. During the Civil War, the Politics of Guatemala forced civilians to join the Civil Defense Patrols, under threat of force. In 1982, these militias had totaled out to less than 30,000 members, increased to 700,000 in 1983, and reached its largest number of members totaling up to 1.3 million men in 1984. In 1988, it had shrunk to 600,000 and in 1994 it shrunk even more to a very low 300,000 members.

During the Guatemalan Revolution, local militias were needed in order to offer a structural opportunity for the state and union to integrate, networks to expand, and new indigenous and oppressed identities to surface and have a voice in society. Also, Civil defense comprises activities designed to minimize the Effects of war on the civilian population, deal with immediate emergency conditions, and quickly restore vital utilities and facilities damaged in an attack. By improving civil defense patrol, response, recovery actions and the overall understanding of critical infrastructure needs, it will help in preventing and mitigating terrorist activity. The patrols were engaged in widespread human rights abuses, beating, torturing, raping, and killing human rights advocates, mayors, judges, villagers, and children. These actions were sometimes ordered by the military, in other occasions it was on their own initiative. When the usage of Civil Defense Patrols first began, they were very loosely organized with very limited contact to Military Officer and no contact with senior patrollers. They operated in more remote areas which included very little supervision from the military at the time. But quite often, these militia would meet with the army and they would share information with one another.

== Impact ==
Here is an example of a circumstance in which people describe their experiences with the Civil Defense Patrols during the Guatemalan Civil War and the Guatemalan Revolution. Guatemala has the most skewed distribution of wealth in Central America, and Reform is not on the agenda. The Financial crisis deepens, hitting the mass of Guatemalans harder than ever. During this time, Rios Montt celebrates a year in power and during this time of celebration and ceremony, the economy of Guatemala was greatly impacted because of the usage of the Civilian Defense Patrol and the Guatemalan Revolution and Civil War. Yet, the most interesting part of this is that Rebellion's objective basis remained untouched.

Another circumstance in which people describe their experiences with the Civil Defense Patrols in Guatemala during the 1960s. The United States was intimately involved in equipping and training Guatemalan security forces that murdered thousands of civilians in the nations civil war. Specifically, the Central Intelligence Agency was in very close ties to the Guatemalan army in the 1980s and the CIA and other U.S. officials were aware of these murders. Some documents were made available to an independent commission formed to investigate human rights abuses during Guatemala’s 36 year civil war, which killed an estimated 200,000 people. A report released a month before these previous documents were released in Guatemala where they blamed government forces for the majority of Human rights violations by the CIA during the conflict. During the 1980s, as U.S. aid grew, Guatemalan military intelligence agents dumped suspected Guerillas-dead and alive- out of airplanes into the ocean. The United States government had used this as a way to help remove evidence of the prisoners being tortured and killed.

The final circumstance I found in which people describe their experiences with the Civil Defense Patrols during the Guatemalan Civil War and the Guatemalan Revolution was in Joyabaj, Guatemala. In the period between 1981 and 1983, the military had used so-called ‘scorched earth tactics’. This resulted in more than 400 villages being destroyed, 75,000 people being killed and more than 1 million people fleeing their homes. These Civil Defense Patrols not only impacted the people of Guatemala, but it also had a very large impact on the indigenous peoples living in Guatemala, including the Kʼicheʼ people. Specifically, the local parish priest Padre Villanueva, was killed on church grounds by Security forces.

== Creation ==
Most indigenous Mayans, who formed 60% of the population and the bulk of the insurgents, lived in areas known as the highlands. Between 1980 and 1981, the highlands were a war zone, as villages had organized in order to defend themselves and demand basic civil rights. Civil defense comprises activities designed to minimize the effects of war on the civilian population, deal with immediate emergency conditions, and quickly restore vital utilities and facilities damaged in an attack. To counter this, the government drew up a counterinsurgency plan. The first phase, called the pacification phase by the military, was created mainly by General Benedicto Lucas García, the brother of Fernando Romeo Lucas García. It called for the complete destruction of villages considered supportive of the insurgents and for the creation of local civil defense patrols. This phase began to take effect under the rule of Fernando Romeo Lucas García and was implemented the rest of the way by General Ríos Montt.

The second phase of the counterinsurgency plan had a goal of reorganizing the social and cultural life of those affected by the war. These were the people living in the highlands. An article published in the magazine Revista Militar, which was based on intelligence gathered by the Guatemalan Army in 1981, suggested that the Ixil Indians, who were the first to organize and rebel, be subjected to a process of ladinoization. This process would, by suppressing characteristics that distinguished the Ixil from other cultures, destroy their culture. It would do this by, among other things, expanding the Civil Defense Patrols.

== Structure/Function ==
Every village in Guatemala had a patrol post at the entrance, and all members were required to report for duty. They usually served two 24-hour shifts a week, though this varied by the size of the village. Each unit consisted of 20 men who were armed with weapons varying from whips to old M1 rifles. This left their practical use as military units at not much, though they did have a strong effect on morale. One army colonel explained "Before, [the Indian] was Juan Pedro from a certain village. Now, in the civil patrol, he feels part of Guatemala. Every civil patrol post has its little Guatemalan flag, whether it's of paper, plastic or whatever, and he is beginning to identify with it." The civil defense patrols were also responsible for keeping track of every able-bodied man in the community and for regulating traffic into and out of the community. They were very effective at this.

== War crimes ==
The Civil Defense Patrols were both responsible for and the victims of war crimes. Males as young as eight years old were forced to serve in the Patrols. In addition to typical military work, members were forced to serve as laborers. Those who refused were forced to find a replacement, or they could be fined, imprisoned, beaten or even executed, all without trial. They would also be labelled as rebel sympathizers and could become the victims of paramilitary groups such as the Patrols themselves. Members of the patrols were sometimes ordered by the local commanders to torture and murder other villagers. One commission found that 90% of the 700 massacres and 100,000 disappearances had been committed by either the army or the patrols. During a particularly violent period between March 1982 and August 1983, tens of thousands of indigenous people were tortured, raped and killed, and the Patrols are suspected to have participated in some of these. Sometimes, the army forced them to carry out these actions, but other times they chose to by themselves.

The patrols also severely disrupted normal life. In an attempt to destroy the Mayans' unique culture, the patrols held rallies during traditional feasts. Indians were forced to wear traditional dress that was supposed to be used only for ceremonies. They were also taught various behaviors not traditional to them, and woman were forced to join various beauty contests. They also ruined the economy, as people weren't able to leave the village without permission from the local commander. This meant that many weren't able to work on plantations, causing them to go unharvested, and people were forced to take up jobs as servants locally.

== Resurgence ==
The Civil Defense Patrols were disbanded on 29 December 1996 by the Peace Accords. However, Amnesty International reported that the patrols maintained close ties with the military and, along with the United Nations Verification Mission in Guatemala, reported that various human rights violations, most notably lynchings, continued to occur. The UN mission observed that most of these occurred areas in where the Patrols had been powerful. In 1999, the Guatemala Human Rights Commission reported that the postwar equivalent of the Patrols, the Community Security Committees, were threatening members who didn't want to join them. Residents of Chinanton and Agua Hedionda reported that former Patrols from San Andrés Sajcabaja were firing guns near people's homes and threatened to kill those who interfered with them. The GHRC also reported that members of the Campesino Unity Committee in El Quiché were threatened by members of Local Security Boards, who were mostly former patrollers organized by the National Civil Police. Residents of Zacualpa received threats from the boards after being labelled as guerrillas for organizing.

In 2000, the United Nations Verification Mission in Guatemala and the Guatemalan Human Rights Ombudsman's Office began investigating the Patrol's resurgence. The UN mission focused on a particular group of Patrols called "The Chain", which operated in Xecopol, Sacabal, Xalbaquiej and Chichicastenango. The Human Rights Ombudsman's Office looked into Patrol operations in El Quiché, Huehuetenango, Jutiapa, Chiquimula and Petén. In Rabinal, Vice Mayor Lucas Tecú attempted to pass a referendum to reinstate the Patrols, despite the fact that doing so would violate the Peace Accords. The coordinator for the Center for Legal Action in Human Rights in Rabinal, María Dolares Itzep, stated that the Patrols had returned because of the execution of three patrolmen in 1998 for a state-directed massacre in 1982. She said, "The ex-members here are scared and angry because of that. That is the reason activity has begun here."

In June 2001, the Guatemala Human Rights Commission reported more attacks by the Patrols. A peasant leader named Carlos Morales had been assaulted in Baja Verapaz. Around that time, Amnesty International reported that, "approximately 30 heavily armed men believed to be former civil patrollers attacked the community of Los Cimientos Chiul, in Chajul, El Quiché. The assailants reportedly raped three women, and destroyed 86 houses, forcing 90 families to flee. The patrollers also kidnapped seven children but released them the next day. Several of the displaced families sought refuge in nearby aldea/area of San Marcos." They also reported that a judge in Senahu has possibly been lynched by the Patrols.

In September 2002, Amnesty International reported that Manuel García de la Cruz of the National Coordination of Guatemalan Widows has been founded tortured and decapitated after he had left his home to buy corn in Joyabaj. García had participated in training and exhumations, and Amnesty International reported that, "in the context of an escalation of threats and intimidation directed at human rights defenders in Guatemala, and the public resurgence of the civil patrols, forensic experts involved in exhumations of mass graves were targeted."

== Compensation ==
In June 2002, former patrollers began demanding financial compensation for their service in the Patrols. By August 2002, up to 20,000 former patrolmen from Mazatenango, Alta Verapaz, Quetzaltenango, Sololá, San Marcos, El Quiché, Chimaltenango, Jutiapa and Huehuetenango were involved. They were supposedly organized by the Association of Guatemalan Military Veterans. In August 2002, under pressure from the movement, President Alfonso Portillo stated that he supported compensation. Opponents of remunerations came from both the conservative and liberal groups in Guatemala, and included the Guatemalan Chamber of Commerce, Coordinating Committee of Commercial, Agricultural, Industrial and Financial Organizations, Guatemalan National Revolutionary Unity, Party of National Advancement, and various embassies and human rights groups. Payments were delayed multiple times, and in August and September 2002, former patrollers from Ixil, El Quiché began blaming the United Nations Verification Mission in Guatemala, Guatemalan Human Rights Ombudsman's Office and Rigoberta Menchú Foundation for the delays. On 26 January 2003, the governor of El Quiché reported that the funds for compensation were available but had been delayed by the Center for Legal Action in Human Rights, Guatemalan Human Rights Ombudsman's Office and Movement of Displaced Peoples of the North of Quiché.
