= Alyssa Peterson =

United States Army soldier (1974–2003)

- Born: Alyssa Renee Peterson; February 29, 1976; Greeley, Colorado, U.S.
- Died: September 15, 2003 (aged 27); Tal Afar Airbase, Iraq
- Burial place: Citizens Cemetery; Flagstaff, Arizona, U.S.
- Military career
- Allegiance: United States of America
- Branch: United States Army
- Service years: July 2001 – September 2003
- Rank: Specialist
- Unit: 101st Airborne Division

Alyssa Renee Peterson (February 29, 1976 – September 15, 2003) was a United States Army soldier, with Arabic language certification, who served with C Company, 311th Military Intelligence Battalion, 101st Airborne in Iraq. Peterson graduated from Northern Arizona University, after which she enlisted in the U.S. Army and attended the Defense Language Institute in California, where she learned Arabic. She also studied interrogation techniques at Fort Huachuca, Cochise County, Arizona.

== Life ==
In the late 1990s, Peterson became fluent in Dutch before serving an 18-month mission in the Netherlands for the Church of Jesus Christ of Latter-day Saints. Peterson later graduated from Northern Arizona University in May 2001 with a bachelor of arts degree in psychology. She enlisted in the U.S. Army in July 2001 and excelled in Arabic courses at the Defense Language Institute in Monterey, California.

Peterson was transferred to Fort Campbell, Kentucky in July 2003 before her deployment to the Middle East sometime thereafter. She was assigned to C Company, 311th Military Intelligence Battalion of the 101st Airborne Division.

== Death ==
Radioed into the Tactical Operations Center at 0900 on September 16, an unidentified aircraft reported visual sighting of a body near the Third Brigade Landing Zone (LZ). After further investigation, it was determined that on September 15, 2003, Alyssa Peterson died from a "non-combat weapons discharge" at the Tal Afar airbase on the Syrian-Iraqi frontier. Subsequent investigation revealed that she had been placed under suicide watch after refusing further participation in interrogation sessions at a location known as "the cage". She had said techniques used there constituted torture of Iraqi prisoners.

According to a report into the investigation into her death:

We told her that you have to be able to turn on and off the interrogation mode -- that you act differently towards the people we meet with outside of the detainee facility," one fellow soldier stated. "She said that she did not know how to be two people; she ... could not be one person in the cage and another outside the wire.

Just before her death, Peterson spoke to another intelligence specialist, Kayla Williams, about her concerns. According to the Huffington Post, Williams also was forced to take part in torture interrogations during which detainees were assaulted, stripped, blindfolded, and then confronted with a female interrogator. It is also reported that interrogation included cramped confinement, stress position, sleep deprivation, insects placed in a confinement box and waterboarding. She refused to participate in this.

Peterson's body was returned to Flagstaff, Arizona, in late September 2003, where she was buried with full military honors at Citizens Cemetery.

== See also ==
- Torture in the United States

== Selected works ==
- Peterson, Alyssa. What is an American patriot?.
