= Jennifer Harbury =

American lawyer and activist (1951-)

Jennifer K. Harbury (born 1951) is an American lawyer, author, and human rights activist. She has been instrumental in forcing the revelation of the complicity of the United States CIA in human rights abuses, particularly in Guatemala and other countries of Central America during the 1980s and 1990s. Initially, she was trying to discover the fate of her husband Efraín Bámaca Velásquez, a Mayan guerrilla leader who was "disappeared" in March 1992 by the Guatemalan military.

After her three hunger strikes, the death of her husband at the hands of the army in 1993 was revealed, together with CIA complicity in his case and other Guatemala Army human rights abuses. Declassified US files revealed that he was tortured and killed by high level intelligence officials in the Guatemalan army, who were also working as paid informants of the CIA. CIA payments to them continued throughout her husband's torture. As a result of her efforts, Congress forced the end to a CIA program. In 1998, President Bill Clinton ordered the declassification of decades of documents related to US activities in Guatemala and other Central American countries, and apologized for US contributions to human rights abuses there while on an official visit to Guatemala.

== Early life and education ==
Harbury grew up in Connecticut and graduated from Cornell University and Harvard Law School. Afterwards, she worked at a small legal aid clinic on the Texas-Mexico border. Among her clients in the early 1980s were Guatemalan Mayans who emigrated to Texas to escape from the death squads that were committing genocide against them during the civil war in their home country. Ignorant of US complicity in the genocide, US immigration denied refugee status to many and forced them to return. Harbury went to Guatemala to see firsthand what was going on.

== Human rights activist ==
In the 1980s, Harbury traveled to Guatemala, where she became more involved in helping the indigenous Mayans. In 1990, she met Efraín Bámaca Velásquez (1957–1992) ) and married him in 1991. An indigenous Mayan, Bámaca was a comandante of the Guatemalan National Revolutionary Unity (URNG) during Guatemala's civil war, known by his nom de guerre of Comandante Everardo. This was a decades-long government and military repression and genocide, largely against Guatemala's indigenous populations.

On March 12, 1992, local members of the Guatemalan army captured Velásquez and secretly detained and tortured him for more than a year. His torturers and murderers were paid CIA informants.

As a U.S. citizen and lawyer, Harbury set out to find her husband's whereabouts, while working with Guatemalans in the US to protest against human rights abuses and trying to force the government to find out about his fate. She took legal action despite receiving threats on her life for these efforts. She initiated two hunger strikes in Guatemala and one in front of the White House, and filed a Freedom of Information Act lawsuit against the CIA to gain access to their information.

During this period, both the Guatemalan and United States governments claimed they had no knowledge of Velásquez's whereabouts. As a result of Harbury's actions, U.S. State Department official Richard Nuccio did internal research and became a whistleblower in 1996. He revealed that the CIA had known both where Velásquez was being held and that the army had killed him. Specifically, Col. Julio Roberto Alpirez, a Guatemalan colonel who studied at the School of the Americas and was a paid informant or "asset" of the CIA, had ordered the murder. Alpirez had also been involved in the murder of U.S. citizen and innkeeper Michael Devine. Moreover, the intelligence agency had a close working relationship with the Central American military death squads who "disappeared" Bámaca and had been funneling money to them despite a Congressional prohibition since 1990. President Clinton ordered an investigation by the Intelligence Oversight Board.

During April 1996, the American nun Dianna Ortiz was fasting across from the White House, seeking the release of CIA papers related to her case of abduction and torture in Guatemala in 1989. This forced the long overdue release of the Intelligence Oversight Board Report. When the papers were released in May, there was no confirmation of her claim that an American had been involved in her case. However, the report did confirm the CIA practice of using known torturers and human rights abusers as paid informants or "assets", and the failure of the U.S. Department of State officials to properly share information as to human rights crimes with the victims and their families., 1996 Intelligence Oversight Board Report on Guatemala.

For his whistle blowing, Richard Nuccio was eventually stripped of his security clearance, ending his career with the State Department by 1997.

Nuccio's revelations caused a scandal for the U.S. government. As a result, President Bill Clinton ordered declassification of United States secret archives on the Velásquez murder and other human rights crimes committed by the Guatemalan military. Documents dating to 1954 were declassified, revealing complex relationships for years between elements in the two countries. Clinton issued a public apology in 1998 in Guatemala for the United States' role in supporting the country's abusive regimes.

Since that time, Harbury has made it her life's work to fight for human rights by documenting, exposing, and speaking publicly about human rights abuses. She has emphasized the abuses by the United States, both historical and contemporary.

== Books ==
- Bridge to Courage: Life Stories of Guatemalan Compañeros & Compañeras (1995) Foreword by Noam Chomsky, photography by Sherrlyn Borkgren.
- Searching for Everardo: A Story of Love, War, and the CIA in Guatemala (1997)
- Truth, Torture, and the American Way (2005)

== Representation in other media ==
- Dirty Secrets: Jennifer, Everardo & the CIA in Guatemala (1998) is a documentary film about her life and work.

== Legacy and honors ==
- In 1995 Harbury received a Letelier-Moffitt Human Rights Award
- In 1997 she shared the Cavallo Award for Moral Courage with Nuccio.

Harbury's work has been widely cited. In addition to extensive public speaking, she has appeared as a guest on the Charlie Rose and Democracy Now! TV programs.

She also is the cousin to noted veterinarian Wendy Brooks.
