= Intelligence Oversight Board Report on Guatemala =

A 1996 report Central Intelligence Agency action in Guatemala by the Intelligence Oversight Board mentioned that the United States helped stop a military coup in 1993, further stating that:

The CIA's successes in Guatemala in conjunction with other U.S. agencies, particularly in uncovering and working to counter coups and in reducing the narcotics flow, were at times dramatic and very much in the national interests of both the United States and Guatemala.

The report goes on to state:

Relations between the U.S. and Guatemalan governments came under strain in 1977, when the Carter administration issued its first annual human rights report on Guatemala. The Guatemalan government rejected that report's negative assessment and refused U.S. military aid. Relations between the two countries warmed in the mid-1980s with gradual improvements in human rights and the Reagan administration's emphasis on curbing the spread of communism in Central America. After a civilian government under President Cerezo was elected in 1985, overt non-lethal US military aid to Guatemala resumed. In December 1990, however, largely as a result of the killing of US citizen Michael DeVine by members of the Guatemalan army, the Bush administration suspended almost all overt military aid.

The US worked with the De Leon government in attempting to strengthen democracy and human rights ... The US also joined the "Group of Friends of the Peace Process," which continues to work to bring an end to Guatemala's 35-year-old internal conflict ... There has been some improvement over time in the Guatemalan military's accountability with regard to human rights violations. Whereas in the 1980s the army acted with total impunity, in the 1990s military personnel were for the first time charged, convicted, and imprisoned for some of their crimes. Senior officers, however, are still rarely charged for their roles in ordering or covering up such crimes. Human rights problems, including cases involving US citizens, remain a serious concern in US-Guatemalan relations.

US policy objectives in Guatemala since 1984 have included supporting the transition to and strengthening of civilian democratic government, encouraging respect for human rights and the rule of law, supporting economic growth, combating illegal narcotics trafficking, fighting the communist insurgency, and, in recent years, advancing the peace process.

The report also goes on to highlight:

The human rights records of the Guatemalan security services—the D-2 and the Department of Presidential Security (known informally as "Archivos," after one of its predecessor organizations)—were generally known to have been reprehensible by all who were familiar with Guatemala. U.S. policy-makers knew of both the CIA's liaison with them and the services' unsavory reputations. The CIA endeavored to improve the behavior of the Guatemalan services through frequent and close contact and by stressing the importance of human rights—insisting, for example, that Guatemalan military intelligence training include human rights instruction. The station officers assigned to Guatemala and the CIA headquarters officials whom we interviewed believe that the CIA's contact with the Guatemalan services helped improve attitudes towards human rights. Several indices of human rights observance indeed reflected improvement—whether or not this was due to CIA efforts—but egregious violations continued, and some of the station's closest contacts in the security services remained a part of the problem.

== Reception ==
The report was generally welcomed by interested parties as a first-step but criticized for its limited scope. A Joint statement by 20 NGOs, including Amnesty International USA said the report focused only on cases in which U.S. citizens or their relatives were the victims and ignored cases prior to 1984. It called for full publication of the report and further declassification of documents.
