= Kayla Williams (author) =

American writer (born 1976)

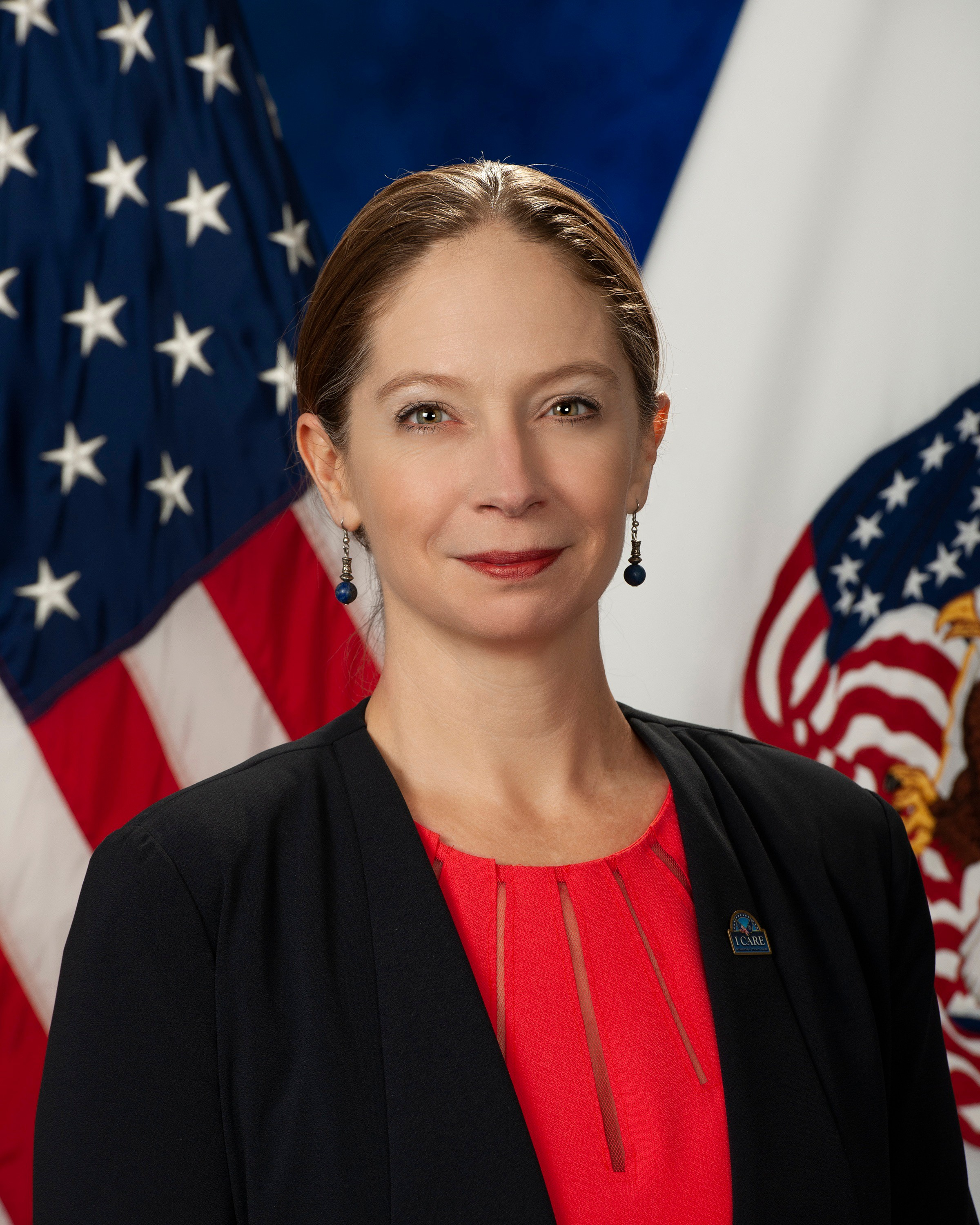
- Williams (c. 2021)

Assistant Secretary of Veterans Affairs for Public and Intergovernmental Affairs
- In office January 20, 2021 – June 17, 2022
- President: Joe Biden
- Secretary: Denis McDonough
- Succeeded by: Brenda Sue Fulton

Personal details
- Born: Kayla M. Williams; September 14, 1976 (age 50) Columbus, Ohio, U.S.
- Education: Bowling Green State University (BA); American University (MA)
- Occupation: Linguist; government official; former intelligence specialist; author
- Military career
- Allegiance: United States of America
- Branch: United States Army
- Service years: 2000–2020
- Rank: Interpreter; linguist; signals intelligence operations specialist

Kayla Maureen Williams is an American government official and a former Arabic linguist in the United States Army who wrote her experiences of the 2003 Iraq invasion in her book Love My Rifle More Than You. This book details her personal experiences during the war in Iraq.

== Background ==
Kayla Maureen Williams was born to R. Darby Williams and Norma Jane (Spirit) Williams on September 14, 1976, in Columbus, Ohio. Her father was an English Professor and her mother was an artist. Williams' parents divorced a year or so after she was born, and she was raised by her mother. She got to travel around much of the United States with her family and also had the chance to go to France.

Williams attended Learning Unlimited and Ecole Francaise for elementary and middle school and then attended Fort Hayes High School. She was a relatively happy child until high school where she joined the "punk" scene. Williams grew up without much money, so she "saw the disparity between the rich and the poor". She felt like an outsider, and the punk scene was a way of choosing to reject society instead of letting it reject her. Also, she enjoyed the music the punk scene offered because it made her feel "cool".

Williams graduated cum laude from Bowling Green State University in 1997 with a BA in English Literature, and with an MA in International Relations at American University.

Following her undergraduate degree, Williams worked for Infinite Outsource in Tampa, Florida, a fund raising collective funded by the Corporation for Public Broadcasting. In October 1999, "a personality conflict with a new female superior" got her fired from this job.

== Invasion of Iraq ==
In January 2000, Williams enlisted in the U.S. Army to train as an interpreter. She was an Arabic linguist/interpreter and SIGINT operations specialist. At the time of the September 11 attacks, Kayla Williams was studying Arabic within the Army. Although she did not support the invasion of Iraq, she took part in one of the earliest invasions in March 2003. Kayla Williams was an Arabic Linguist as well as a SIGINT operations specialist for 5 full years. This includes a full year of deployment (2003/2004) in SWA (Iraq & Kuwait) during the buildup to and during the invasion of Iraq. She continued to serve in Iraq until February 2004. She served in the 101st ABN Div (Air Assault), 3rd BCT, (187th Inf Regt) "Rakkasans".

Kayla Williams did not support the war in Iraq when they invaded. She says it seemed hypocritical to go to Iraq in search of Weapons of Mass Destruction while ignoring North Korea's nuclear program. She also believed that they were losing their focus on the real war on terror by invading Iraq instead of finishing the mission in Afghanistan. However, after going to Iraq and meeting Iraqi people, she began to feel that they were doing the right thing even if it had been for the wrong reason.

Her book details not only the hardships of the Iraqi people, but the soldiers themselves. She also spoke to Soledad O'Brien on CNN about the suicide of her colleague Alyssa Peterson and explained how she was also forced to take part in torture interrogations during which detainees were assaulted, stripped, blindfolded, and then confronted with a female interrogator. Williams also said she is still haunted by these events years later.

== Career after military ==
In November 2020, Williams was named a volunteer member of the Joe Biden presidential transition Agency Review Team to support transition efforts related to the United States Department of Veterans Affairs.

On January 20, 2021, Williams was appointed as Assistant Secretary, Office of Public and Intergovernmental Affairs at the U. S. Department of Veterans Affairs. She stepped down from the role in June 2022.

== Bibliography ==
Year	Title	Publisher
2014	Plenty of Time When We Get Home: Love & Recovery in the Aftermath of War	W. W. Norton & Company
2006	Love My Rifle More than You: Young & Female in the U.S. Army	W. W. Norton & Company

== See also ==
- Colby Buzzell
