= Guatemala Human Rights Commission =

Guatemalan humanitarian organization

The Guatemala Human Rights Commission/USA (GHRC) is a nonprofit, nonpartisan, humanitarian organization that monitors, documents, and reports on the human rights situation in Guatemala. GHRC advocates for survivors of human rights abuses in Guatemala, and works toward systemic change.

GHRC publishes a quarterly newsletter called El Quetzal, supports the Voiceless Speak Fund, hosts annual delegations, leads speaking tours, and presents film series on human rights issues. The commission has founded the For Women's Right to Live Campaign and the Human Rights Defenders Program. It has assisted Guatemalans seeking political asylum in other countries, for instance by introducing resolutions to the US Congress, and supporting cases before the Inter-American Commission on Human Rights.

As a non-governmental (NGO) human rights commission, GHRC/USA is independent of the Guatemalan government. It has no connection with the national human rights institution, the Procurador de los Derechos Humanos, established as a government organization.

== History ==
GHRC was founded in 1982 by the American nun, Alice Zachmann, SSND (School Sisters of Notre Dame), in response to having witnessed the human rights abuses taking place in the country in the late 1970s during the Guatemalan Civil War (1960–1996). She left her missionary parish work in St. Paul, Minnesota, to work on issues in Guatemala and from the United States.

To counteract the lack of public attention to the rise in political and state violence in the 1980s, the Commission published urgent action bulletins, organized speaking tours and delegations, and created "Voiceless Speak", a program that provides financial assistance to Guatemalans living in the United States who promote peace and respect for human rights in their native country. In 1989, it started the Guatemala Human Rights UPDATE, a bi-weekly human rights publication. This was published through 2009.

In the early 1990s, the Commission supported, among others, the efforts of Jennifer Harbury, an American lawyer who worked to learn about the whereabouts and fate of her husband, the Maya guerrilla commander Efraín Bámaca Velasquez after he "disappeared" in 1992 in Guatemala. He was later confirmed as having been tortured under interrogation for more than a year and killed by the Guatemalan Army in 1993, in violation of the Geneva Conventions regarding prisoners of war.

By staging hunger strikes and holding multiple protests in Guatemala and the United States, Harbury and GHRC members raised attention to human rights abuses in Guatemala. They were aided by the work of Richard Nuccio, a whistleblower in the State Department, who advised a Congressman of CIA complicity in the actions of death squads in the country, in violation of a Congressional ban on funding the Guatemala military. Amidst the ensuing scandal, Congress ended the CIA program.

In 1998 President Bill Clinton ordered the declassification of decades of documents that dealt with the United States’ actions in Guatemala, which revealed long relations between the intelligence agencies and funding of Guatemala military. He apologized to Guatemala during a visit there in 1998, for US involvement in human rights abuses. GHRC's involvement in the case briefly made it a target of US government surveillance.

After the Peace Accords were signed in 1996, GHRC began the Puentes de Paz project. It supports the mental health needs of a women's group in Guatemala by providing psychologists. In addition, GHRC founded Torture Abolition and Survivors Support Coalition (TASSC), a program to support survivors of torture in Guatemala. Both groups later achieved independent non-profit status.
