= Lester Eugene Siler =

Convicted drug dealer and torture victim

Lester Eugene Siler, a convicted drug dealer in the United States, was beaten and tortured by Campbell County, Tennessee police during an interrogation at his home, during which officers attempted to coerce Siler to sign a consent form giving them permission to search his home without a warrant.

On July 8, 2004, police officers entered the house of Siler and tortured him using various methods, including applying electricity to his genitalia. Upon arrival, the officers asked his wife, Jenny, and son, Austin, to leave. Before the torture, however, Siler's wife set up an audio recorder which captured a large portion of the incident.

Five officers, Gerald David Webber, Samuel R. Franklin, Joshua Monday, Shayne Green, and William Carroll were convicted in federal court of the beatings and attempted cover-up. They received prison sentences ranging from 51 to 72 months.

In 2016, a jury trial resulted in a $115,000 award to Siler. This was appealed by Siler for being inadequately low, but the Tennessee Court of Appeals upheld the verdict.
