= Torture Abolition and Survivors Support Coalition =

TASSC International
- Formation: 1998
- Type: Nongovernmental organization
- Purpose: End governments' use of torture
- Headquarters: Washington, DC
- Location: United States
- Executive Director: Aymen Tabir
- Parent organization: None
- Affiliations: None
- Website: Official website

The Torture Abolition and Survivors Support Coalition International (TASSC) is a non-governmental, nonprofit organization based in the United States that works to end the practice of torture internationally and to support the survivors of torture and their families. TASSC is concerned not only with the prevention of torture but also addresses its aftermath, the individual survivor, family, community, and society. In addition to creating a worldwide network of International Communities of Healing for torture survivors and their families, TASSC also seeks to influence domestic and international policy through advocacy, social action, public testimony, and targeted media campaigns. The organization monitors human rights violations in nations where TASSC members may be at risk, operates Helping Hands, a direct assistance program for survivors, and coordinates the annual United Nations International Day in Support of Torture Victims and Survivors (June 26). TASSC was founded in 1998 by Sister Dianna Ortiz, an American survivor of torture while a missionary in Guatemala. The office of TASSC is located in Washington, D.C. Survivors and volunteers make up the leadership of TASSC including the Board of Directors. Current Board President is Heidi Evans, Treasurer is Sarah Clarke, and Secretary is Sara Bauman.

== History ==
The Torture Abolition and Survivors Support coalition International was founded in 1998 by Sister Dianna Ortiz, a United States Roman Catholic nun of the Ursuline order. She was abducted and tortured over 24 hours on November 2, 1989, while serving as a missionary in Guatemala. After her release, she filed a civil suit against the Defense Minister of Guatemala.

Sister Dianna wanted an organization based on survivors. TASSC is the only organization in the United States that is founded by torture survivors to educate and make people aware about countries where torture is practiced.

In 2007, TASSC campaigned to repeal the Military Commissions Act of 2006, a law that authorized military tribunals to try enemy combatants for war crimes without permitting habeas corpus to the accused.

== Programs ==
=== Helping Hands ===
Because torture is designed to destroy the human spirit and make people lose faith in themselves and in others, torture survivors face unique challenges as they learn to trust again. TASSC works to assist survivors in their quest to reintegrate themselves into society through the Helping Hands program. The program responds to the immediate social, medical, psychological and legal needs that survivors have as a result of torture. Helping Hands supports survivors in their asylum process, in their transition to self-sufficiency, and in their journey towards healing. It also aims to foster the re-establishment of trust in self, others, and the world.

=== Truth Speakers ===
Truth Speakers is TASSC's public speaking network. Survivors of torture speak out publicly about their experiences to promote the campaign against torture.

Truth Speakers is one of TASSC's three education and advocacy programs through which it fulfills its mission to educate the public about the increased use of torture today by the United States and 150 other governments.

The mission of TASSC's Truth Speakers is to educate the public about the fact that governments today use torture despite nearly every state's legal responsibilities to desist from torture under the Geneva Conventions, the Convention Against Torture, and in the United States, the Eighth Amendment of the Constitution. Truth Speakers give presentations to church groups, nongovernmental organizations, community forums, advocacy groups, high school classes and universities in cities across the United States and abroad. TASSC promotes public understanding of crucial facts about torture, including: that torture does not produce truth during interrogation; that torturing detainees may increase the probability of the torture of U.S. personnel when captured; and that torture brutalizes the torturer and all persons responsible for it, no matter their standing in the chain of command. The topics on which the speakers engage include issues of torture related to women's or children's rights, refugees, slavery, impunity, economic globalization, and international law. All presentations incorporate the authentic voices of those who have survived torture and speak of it from personal experience.

=== Communities of Healing ===
Despite the Convention Against Torture (UNCAT) banning the practice of torture, the prevalence of this egregious human rights abuse persists. While many organizations and efforts are continuously brought forth to hold perpetrators of torture accountable, many do not address the needs of those most afflicted by this abuse: the survivors. Working to fill this gap, TASSC International uses the International Communities of Healing to focus specifically on the rehabilitation of survivors of torture by healing themselves through mutual support, recognition, and validation. TASSC's International Communities of Healing (ICOH) are spaces where survivors gather and work together to help each other heal. Community self-empowerment is an important part of overcoming the experience of torture. TASSC provides a forum to support that process through the International Communities of Healing. Communities of Healing has ten locations inside of the United States, and eight in other countries, including Argentina, Canada and Mexico.

== See also ==
- CIA black sites
- Torture in the United States
