= Susan Bandes =

American lawyer

Susan A. Bandes
- Born: 1951 (age 74–75); New York City
- Education: University of Michigan (J.D.); State University of New York at Buffalo (B.A.)
- Occupation: The Centennial Distinguished Professor at DePaul University.
- Spouse: Stephen Siegel
- Children: Daniel Siegel, Andrew Siegel
- Website: http://www.susanbandes.com

Susan Bandes is an American lawyer and the current Centennial Distinguished Professor Emeritus at DePaul University. Bandes is considered one of the 20 most cited law professors in criminal law and procedure.

== Biography ==
Bandes graduated the University of Michigan Law School in 1976, worked at the Illinois Office of the State Appellate Defender, and then served as staff counsel at the Illinois ACLU, where she litigated a broad range of civil liberties issues and also (with Erwin Chemerinsky and Jeffrey Shaman) drafted and lobbied for passage of the Illinois Freedom of Information Act. She joined the DePaul faculty in 1984, and was named Distinguished Research Professor in 2003 and Centennial Distinguished Professor in 2012. She took emeritus status in 2017. She has written more than 70 articles, and is among the most widely cited law professors in the field of criminal law and procedure. Her work appears in, among others, the Yale, Stanford, University of Chicago, Michigan and Southern California law reviews, as well as interdisciplinary journals like Law and Social Inquiry and the Law and Society Review. Her book The Passions of Law published by NYU Press in 2000, is referred to as a "groundbreaking anthology" and a "high water mark" of the emerging discipline of the study of law and emotion.

Bandes has been a visiting professor at the University of Chicago Law School and Northwestern Law School, a visiting scholar at NYU Law School and the Berkeley Center for the Study of Law and Society, a Fulbright Scholar at Uppsala University in Sweden, and Distinguished Visiting Scholar at the University of New South Wales.

Bandes is a member of the American Law Institute and a fellow of the American Bar Foundation. She has long been active in the Law and Society Association, where she is the founder, with Jill Hunter (University of New South Wales) and Jody Madeira (University of Indiana/Bloomington), of the Collaborative Research Network on Law and Emotion.

== Selected publications ==
=== Books ===
- The Passions of Law (NYU Press, 2000).
- Research Handbook on Law and Emotion, Susan Bandes, Jody Lynee Madeira, Kathryn Temple and Emily Kidd White eds. (Edward Elgar, 2021).

=== Book chapters ===
- From Dragnet to Brooklyn 99: How Cops Shows Excuse, Exalt and Erase Police Brutality, Routledge Handbook of Police Brutality in America (Thomas Aiello ed.) 2022.
- Closure in the Criminal Courtroom: The Birth and Strange Career of an Emotion, in the Edward Elgar Research Handbook on Law and Emotion (Bandes, Madeira, Temple and White eds.) 2021.
- Share Your Grief But Not Your Anger: Victims and the Expression of Emotion in Criminal Justice, in Emotional Expression: Philosophical, Psychological, and Legal Perspectives (Smith and Abell eds., Cambridge University Press, 2016)
- Remorse and Demeanor in the Courtroom: The Cognitive Science of Evaluating Contrition, in The Integrity of Criminal Process: From Theory into Practice (Hunter, Roberts, Young and Dixon eds., Hart Publishing, 2015)
- Law and Emotion, 213 International Encyclopedia of Social and Behavioral Science (James D. Wright ed., Elsevier 2nd ed. 2015)
- Emotion and Deliberation: The Autonomous Citizen in the Social World, in NOMOS LIII, Passions and Emotions, NYU Press (James E. Fleming, ed., 2013)

=== Selected articles ===
- What Are Victim Impact Statements For? 87 Brooklyn Law Review 1253 (2021)
- Feeling and Thinking Like a Lawyer: Cognition, Emotion, and the Practice and Progress of Law, 89 Fordham Law Review 1 (2021)
- Empathy and Remote Legal Proceedings, 51 Southwestern L. Rev. 1 (2021) (with Neal Feigenson).
- Virtual Trials: Necessity, Invention, and the Evolution of the Courtroom, 68 Buffalo Law Review 1275 (2020) (with Neal Feigenson)
- The Mismeasure of Terry Stops: Assessing the Psychological and Emotional Harms of Stop and Frisk to Individuals and Communities, 37 Behavioral Sciences and the Law 176 (2019) (with Phillip Atiba Goff, Erin Kerrison, and Marie Pryor)
- Video, Popular Culture, and Police Excessive Force: The Elusive Narrative of Over-Policing, 2018 University of Chicago Legal Forum
- Police Accountability and the Problem of Regulating Consent Searches, 2018 Illinois Law Review 1760 (2018)
- All Bathwater, No Baby: Expressive Theories of Punishment and the Death Penalty, 116 Michigan Law Review 905 (2018)
- Compassion and the Rule of Law, 13 International Journal of Law in Context 184 (2017)
- What Executioners Can--and Cannot--Teach Us About the Death Penalty, 35 Criminal Justice Ethics 183 (2016)
- Remorse and Criminal Justice, Emotion Review (Special Issue on Law and Emotion, Susan Bandes and Terry Maroney eds.) pp 1–6 (Dec. 2015)
- Emotion, Proof and Prejudice: The Cognitive Science of Gruesome Photos and Victim Impact Statements, 62 Arizona State Law Journal 1003 (2014) (with Jessica Salerno)
- Emotion and the Law, 8 The Annual Review of Law and Social Science 161 (2012) (with Jeremy Blumenthal)
- The Lone Miscreant, the Self-Training Prosecutor, and Other Fictions: A Comment on Connick v. Thompson, 80 Fordham Law Review 715 (2011)
- And All the Pieces Matter: Thoughts on THE WIRE and the Criminal Justice System, 8 Ohio State Journal of Criminal Law 435 (2011)
- Is it Immoral to Punish the Heedless and Clueless? 29 Law and Philosophy 433 (2010)
- Empathetic Judging and the Rule of Law, 2009 Cardozo Law Review De Novo 133
- The Heart Has its Reasons: Examining the Strange Persistence of the American Death Penalty, 42 Studies in Law, Politics and Society 21 (Austin Sarat ed. 2008)
- Emotions, Values, and the Construction of Risk, 156 U. Pa. L. Rev. 421 Pennumbra (2008)
- The Lessons of Capturing the Friedmans: Moral Panic, Institutional Denial, and Due Process, 3 The Journal of Law, Culture and Humanities 93 (2007). Cited extensively in Friedman v. Rehal, (618 F.3d 142 (2d Circuit 2010))
- Loyalty to One's Convictions: The Prosecutor and Tunnel Vision, 49 Howard Law Journal 475 (2006)
- Erie and the History of the One True Federalism, 110 Yale Law Journal 829 (2001)
- Patterns of Injustice: Police Brutality in the Courts, 47 Buffalo Law Review 1275 (1999)
- Empathy, Narrative and Victim Impact Statements, 63 University of Chicago Law Review 361 (1996), reprinted in Nussbaum and Law (Robin West ed., Ashgate 2015) and in Capital Punishment: The Actors in the Process (Austin Sarat ed., Ashgate 2005)
- The Negative Constitution: A Critique, 88 Michigan Law Review 2271 (1990) (reprinted in RIGHTS (Robin West ed. 2000))
- The Idea of a Case, 42 Stanford Law Review 227 (1990)
