= National Order of the Cedar =

Highest state order of Lebanon

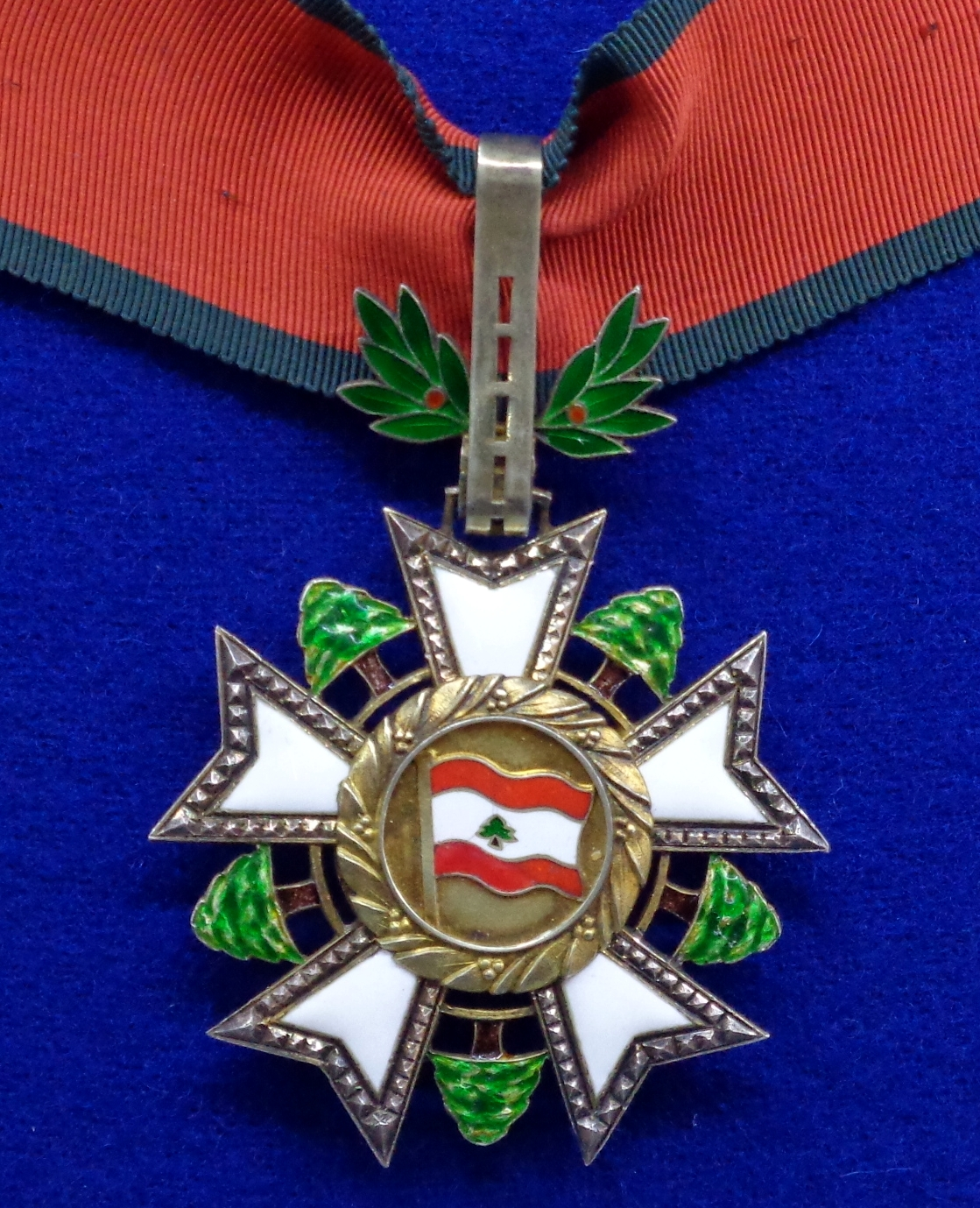
- Commander's badge of the order.

Awarded by Lebanon
- Type: State order
- Established: 31 December 1936
- Awarded for: Great services rendered to Lebanon, for acts of courage and devotion of great moral value, as for years in public service
- Status: Active
- Grades: Five. From lowest to highest: Knight Officer Commander Grand Officer Grand Cordon

Precedence
- Next (higher): Lebanese Order of Merit
- Next (lower): Navy Medal
- Ribbon bar

Officer medal of the National Order of the Cedar.

The National Order of the Cedar (Arabic: وسام الأرز الوطني, romanized: Wisām al-Arz al-Waṭaniyy) is the highest state order of Lebanon, established on 31 December 1936. It is offered in five grades.

== History ==
The Order was created on the 31 December 1936, but is regulated by the Lebanese Code of Decorations as set out in Decree-Law 122 of 12 June 1959. It is awarded, usually, by the President of the Republic of Lebanon, for “great services rendered to Lebanon, for acts of courage and devotion of great moral value, as for years in public service”.

== Insignia ==
The Medal itself consists of a five-pointed white enamel gilt-edged Maltese cross, with stylized green and brown enamel cedars of Lebanon between the arms on a green enamel laurel wreath suspension; the face with a central red enamel medallion inscribed in Arabic ‘Lubnan’ (Lebanon) within an inscribed gilt ring; the reverse with a circular central gilt medallion bearing the red and white enamel national flag of the Republic of Lebanon within an inscribed gilt ring. It has a diameter of 20 mm (¾ inch).

National Order of the Cedar ribbon bars
Grand Cordon	Grand Officer	Commander	Officer	Knight

== Recipients in selection ==
=== 2020s ===
- Ziad Assi Rahbani, Commander, 28 July 2025 – a Lebanese composer, pianist, playwright, and political commentator. (posthumously)
- Nazih Elias Hedari, Grand Officer, 7 September 2024 – Brigadier General in the Lebanese Armed Forces served from 1980 to 2016. Former Commander of the 11th Infantry Brigade

=== 2010s ===
- Dr Pierre Daccache, Commander, 2 August 2019
- Ghaleb Farha, UNDP Goodwill Ambassador for Persian Gulf Region, 2018
- Michael Beary, Irish Army Major-General, 2018
- Melhem Barakat, (1942–2016) Lebanese singer and songwriter, 2016
- Fouad Naffah, (1925–2017) Lebanese Minister of Foreign Affairs, 2017
- Toni Issa, former Board of Directors of IPT Group, 2014
- Ziad Alexandre Hayek, former Secretary General of the High Council for Privatization and PPP, 2014
- Walid Jumblatt, Lebanese politician, 2014. Was awarded the medal by President Michel Suleiman "in appreciation for his national role and political moderation and his call for dialogue among political rivals."
- Wissam al-Hassan, (1965–2012) Chief of Information Branch – Grand officer, 2012.
- Marie Bashir, Governor of New South Wales, Australia — Grand Cordon, 2012.
- Ali Wehbi, "The Lebanese Desert Runner" – Knight, 2012
- Ghassan Tueni, (1926–2012) Journalist and politician, 2012.
- Salim Ghazal, Melkite Bishop and Champion of Co-Existence in Lebanon, Commander – 2011.
- Bashar al-Assad, Syrian President – Grand Cordon, 2010.
- Paolo Gerometta, Italian UNIFIL SWC and JTF-L Commander, Knight – 2010.

=== 2000s ===
- Carlos Slim Helu, Businessman, Nouhad Mahmoud, Ambassador of Lebanon in Mexico – Grand Officer, 2008.
- Julia Boutros, Singer – Officer, 2007.
- Fariha Al-Ahmad, Sheikha of Kuwait – Commander, 2007.
- H.E Dr. Mohammed Qubaty, Yemeni Ambassador – Grand Officer, 2007. Was awarded the medal by President Émile Lahoud "in appreciation of his unprecedented role in strengthening Lebanese-Yemeni relations on numerous fronts including economic cooperation on investments, transportation, marine affairs, agriculture and health and organizing the first Lebanese Head of State visit to Yemen in 2004."
- Farid G. Mitri, Lebanese Biomedical Researcher, Associate Professor of Biomedical Engineering, Mayo Clinic, - Officer, 2007, and Senior Scientist – Commander, 2018.
- Salim Ghazal, Melkite Greek Catholic bishop, Pacem in Terris Peace and Freedom Award, 2007.
- M. Denis Vienot, President of Caritas Internationalis, the Catholic relief organization – Officer, 2007.
- Randa Chahal, Lebanese filmmaker – Knight, 2007.
- Pierre Shamesian, Lebanese-Armenian Comedy Actor, 2007.
- Ibrahim Elias Muhanna, Lebanese Actuary – Officer, 2007.
- Shahantoukhd, Lebanese-Armenian Writer, and Community contributor, 2007.
- Nadeem H. Shwayri, Founder of the Al-Kafaàt Foundation - Commander, 2007.
- Ibrahim El Khoury, ex-chairman of Tele Liban, co-founder, and ex-chairman of Voice of Lebanon radio - Officer, 2007.
- Charles Elachi, Lebanese-American Scientist, Director of NASA's Jet Propulsion Laboratory- Officer, 2006.
- Max Chaya, Lebanese Mountain Climber – Knight, 2003 – Officer, 2006.
- Jean Misak Belian, General Inspector in The Lebanese Government General Inspection Department, 2006.
- Henri Wakim El Habr, businessman, founder and former owner of Madinat al-Mafrouchat (City Furniture) - Officer, 2005.
- Michel Elefteriades, Greek-Lebanese politician, artist, producer and businessman – Commander, 2005.
- Philippe Ziade, Lebanese journalist, founder of the National News Agency, 2005.
- Anthony Bailey, interfaith campaigner
- Spencer Abraham, Lebanese-American U.S. Secretary of Energy and former U.S. Senator for Michigan – Commander, 2004.
- H. John Shammas, M.D., Chairman, Lebanese American Foundation- Officer, 2004.
- Edgar Choueiri, Lebanese-American scientist, Professor of Applied Physics at Princeton University- Knight, 2004.
- Mother Monica Brennan, Jesus & Mary (JM) School, Rabweh, Lebanon, recognised for contribution to education 2004 by Ambassador Jihad Mortada
- Mahathir Mohamad, Prime Minister of Malaysia (1981–2003) – Commander, 2003.
- Jacques Nasser, Lebanese-Australian Executive, CEO of Ford Motor Company (1999–2001) – Officer, 2002.
- Pierre de Bané, Canadian Senator, Officer – 2002.
- Khaireddine Haseeb, Iraqi Economist – Commander, 2002.
- Nelly M. Abboud, President Elect and President of Lebanese American Engineers Society, Associate Professor of Civil and Environmental Engineering and Coordinator of the Undergraduate Environmental Engineering Program at The University of Connecticut – Commander, 2001.
- George V. Savvaides, Greek Diplomat – Commander, 2001.
- Claude Comair, Co-Founder Nintendo Software Technology, Founder of DigiPen – Commander, 2001.
- Carlos Haddad, Lebanese-Brazilian businessman and philanthropist, Grand Officer – 2001.
- Faten Hamama, Egyptian Actress – Commander, 2001.
- Bechara El Khoury, Lebanese Composer – Knight, 2001.
- May Arida, President of Baalbeck International Festival – Commander, 2000.
- James Sreenan – Chief of Staff of the Irish Defence Forces (2004–2007) – Commander, 2000.
- José Cura, Argentinian Operatic Tenor – Knight, 2000.
- Maroun Y. Abi-Rached, Lebanese dermatologist – Commander, 2000.

=== 1990s ===
- Hassan Khalil Ramadan, Former Director General of Lebanese Republic, 1991.
- Paul Guiragossian, Artist, painter – Commander, 1993.
- Dr. Raja Afif Iliya, Civil Engineer and Professor Emeritus at the American University of Beirut – Knight, 1994.
- Wissam Boustany, British concert flutist – Knight, 1997.
- Stanisław F. Wozniak, Poland, Major General, FC UNIFIL – Commander. 1997
- Rafic Hariri, Lebanese Prime Minister (1992 to 1998 and 2000 to 2004) – Commander, 1983 – Grand Cordon, 1996.
- Ziad R. Beydoun, Lebanese geologist, Professor of Geology at the American University of Beirut – Knight, 1995.
- Kehdy Farhoud Kehdy, Lebanese Attorney and Poet (1904–2002), Officer, 1995.

=== 1980s ===
- Dr. Fuad Sami Haddad, Lebanese neurosurgeon – Commander, 1988.
- Captain Sami Daoud Abi-Abdallah, Lebanese Army Officer – Knight, 1988.
- Jad Azkoul, Lebanese Classical guitarist – Knight, 1988.
- Dr. Elias T. Saadi, American-Lebanese activist and renowned cardiologist – Knight, 1986.
- William O'Callaghan (Irish Army officer), Irish Army Lieutenant-General, Force Commander United Nations Interim Force in Lebanon, Medal level.
- Larry R. Williams, USMC 1983, Commanding Officer, 10th U.S. Marine Regiment. U.S. Marine Corps political liaison to Lebanese government during bombing of the U.S. Marine Barracks, Beirut. - Officer 1983, Ray Rodriguez, (Marine) [Ray Rodriguez], USS Iwo Jima, HMM-162, Beirut, Lebanon, SSGT, Marine, during bombing of the U.S. Marine Barracks, - Beirut, Lebanon October 23, 1983.

=== 1970s ===
- Boutros Salim AbouNader, Lebanese aviator – Knight, 1975.
- Fouad Mostafa Awad, Egyptian Economist – Officer, 1974.
- Pedro Budib Name, Mexican businessman – Knight, 1974.
- Abdallah Chahine, Lebanese Pianist – Knight, 1974.
- Mansour F. Armaly, Palestinian-American physician – Knight, 1973.
- Grégoire A. Dragatsi, MD, DTM&H, prominent Greek-Lebanese physician and Associate Clinical professor at the American University of Beirut – Knight, 1972.
- Zdzisław Wójcik, ambassador of Poland to Lebanon 1965–1971 – Grand Cordon, 1971.

=== 1960s ===
- Edwin Terry Prothro, American Psychologist and Educator, Professor of Psychology at the American University of Beirut – Knight, 1969.
- Petar Zdravkovski, ambassador of Yugoslavia to Lebanon 1965–1967 (died in Beirut July 24, 1967), awarded Grand Cordon posthumously, 1967.
- Fairuz, Lebanese Singer – Knight, 1957 – Commander, 1963.
- Stephen Henry Roberts, Australian Historian, Vice-Chancellor of the University of Sydney (1947–1967) – Knight, 1961.
- Ali Oayda, prominent Lebanese businessman, migrated to Australia 1950.-Knight
- Ersie Cajoleas, Greek-American Fashion Designer, creative contribution promoting Lebanese materials - Knight, 1960

=== 1950s ===
- Umm Kulthum, Egyptian singer, songwriter and actress – Commander, 1959.
- Charles Corm, Writer, Industrialist and Philanthropist – Grand Officer, 1959.
- Angela Jurdak Khoury, Lebanon's First Female Diplomat, 1959.
- James Terry Duce, Geologist, Diplomat and Writer - Commander 1958.
- Doctor James G. Hamilton, British Neurosurgeon – Commander, 1959.
- Naim Moghabghab, Lebanese Lawyer and Politician, Independence Hero – Grand Officer, 1959.
- William Armstrong West, Professor of Chemistry, American University of Beirut – Officer, 1959.
- Emile Khalil Moghabghab, Private Secretary to Lebanese President Camille Nemr Chamoun – Knight
- Georges David Corm, Lebanese Painter – Officer, 1958.
- Constantinos A. Doxiadis, Greek Architect and Urban Planner – Knight, 1958.
- Khalifa bin Salman Al Khalifa, Prime Minister of Bahrain – Gran Officer, 1957.
- Ibrahim Alsuleiman Alakeel, Chief of the Saudi King’s Deputy’s court — Grand Officer, 1957.
- Mustafa Farroukh, Lebanese Painter – Officer, 1954.
- Nikolay Saksonov, Russian weightlifter, 1954.
- Herman Willem Alexander Heldring - Knight, 10 June 1953.
- Boulos Lebiane, Lebanese businessman and philanthropist - Officer, 50s.
- Howard Charles Wells, American employee of Aramco-Tapline, held in highest esteem for work with national employees from 1947-1958. Knight January 21, 1958. Awarded by Prime Minister of Lebanon, Sami Sohl.

=== Unknown dates ===
- Dr Karim Azkoul, Lebanese Diplomat and Philosopher
- Alain F. Carpentier, French heart surgeon – Commander.
- Andrée Castanié, French fashion journalist – Knight
- Issam Fares, Lebanese Philanthropist and Financier, Deputy Prime Minister of Lebanon – Officer, Grand Officer.
- Taha Hussein, Egyptian author.
- King Idris of Libya, Libyan monarch.
- Jean-Marie Lustiger, Archbishop of Paris, Cardinal – Grand Cordon.
- Pierre Mauroy, French Prime Minister (1981–1984) – Grand Cordon.
- Abbé Pierre, French Catholic priest and Humanitarian – Officer.
- Fayez Sayegh, Palestinian American scholar and civil servant – Knight.
- Mohammad Reza Shah Pahlavi, Shah of Iran – Extraordinary Grade.
