= School of the Americas Watch =

United States advocacy organization

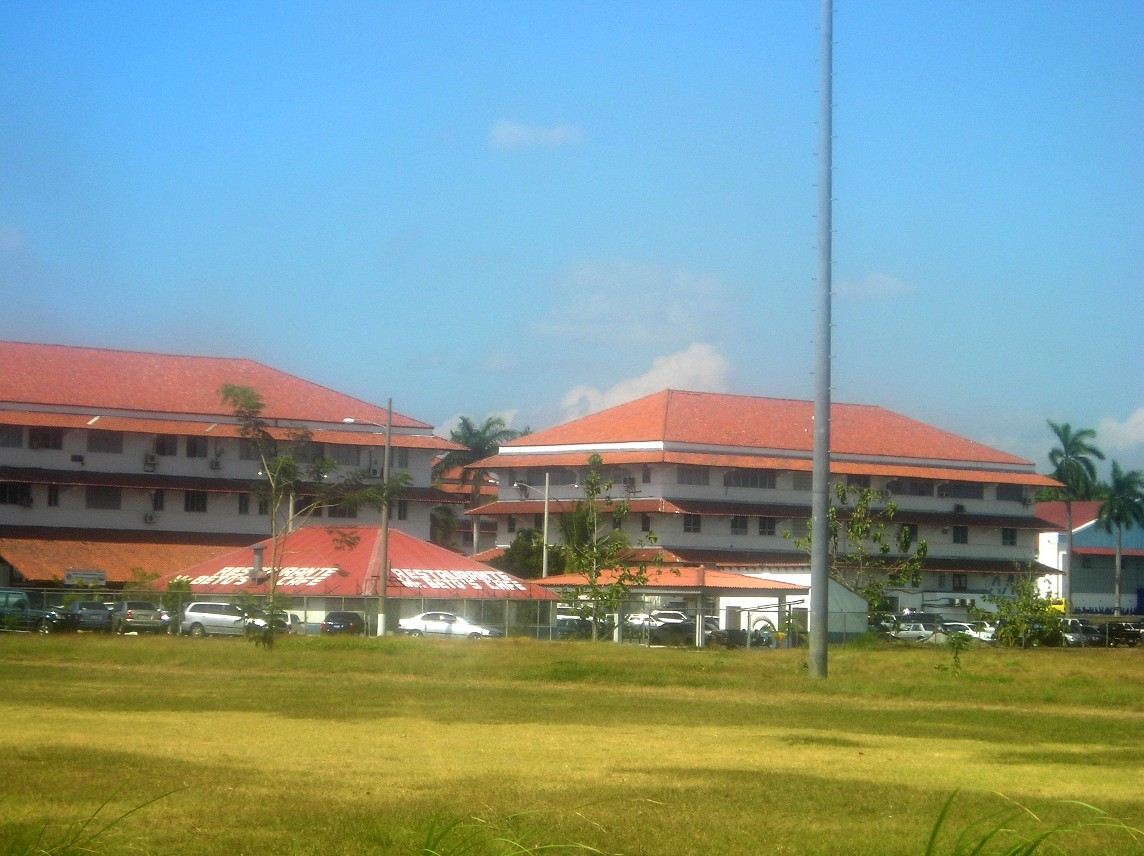
Panama, buildings of the School of the Americas

School of the Americas Watch is an advocacy organization founded by former Maryknoll Roy Bourgeois and a group of supporters in 1990 to protest the training of mainly Latin American military officers, by the United States Department of War, at the School of the Americas (SOA) at Fort Benning. Most notably, SOA Watch conducts a vigil each November at the site of the academy, located on the grounds of Fort Benning, to protest human rights abuses committed by some graduates of the academy or under their leadership, including murders, rapes and torture and contraventions of the Geneva Conventions.

Military officials state that even if graduates commit war crimes after they return to their home country, the school itself should not be held accountable for their actions. Responding to "mounting protests", which were spearheaded by SOA Watch, the United States Congress renamed the School of the Americas the Western Hemisphere Institute for Security Cooperation (WHINSEC), rather than closing the academy, in 2000. In addition, all students must undergo a minimum of eight hours of class on human rights and the principle of civilian control of the military.

== Origins ==
In 1983, inspired by the case of slain Archbishop Óscar Romero, who said "we who have a voice must speak for the voiceless," Former Catholic priest Roy Bourgeois, along with Larry Rosebaugh and Linda Ventimiglia, posed as military officers and crossed into Ft. Benning. The two men and a woman climbed a tree near the barracks housing Salvadoran troops and read the final homily of Archbishop Oscar Romero through megaphones. Bourgeois and his companions were arrested; Bourgeois was prosecuted and sentenced to 18 months in prison for trespassing onto federal property.

Bourgeois and his followers began to research the School of the Americas, conduct public education campaigns, lobby Congress, and practice nonviolent resistance at the School of the Americas facilities.

Following the November 1989 murders of six Jesuit priests, their housekeeper and her daughter at the Central American University in El Salvador in which graduates of the School of the Americas were involved, SOA Watch organized an annual protest to be held on the anniversary of the massacre beginning the next year. The event has been held every year since then.

== Non-violent demonstrations ==
Protest demonstrations are staged by SOA Watch at the main gate of Fort Benning in November each year, in commemoration of the anniversary of the 1989 murders of Jesuits in El Salvador. The growing annual protest has remained a major focus for SOA Watch and the grassroots movement to close the SOA/WHINSEC, which likewise has grown throughout the Americas since the first protest in 1990. The original band of ten resisters who marched onto Fort Benning and splashed blood upon the School of Americas to commemorate the first anniversary of the UCA massacre has grown in recent years to a community of 10,000. People come from across the country and around the globe to honor victims of crimes committed by students of the School of the Americas, as well as their survivors, with music, words, puppets and theatre.

Traditionally the legal vigil and memorial service concludes with a mock funeral procession, using the Presente! litany, onto Fort Benning, with all who choose to march onto the post trespassing on federal property and subject to arrest. Subsequent to 9/11 and the erection of a security fence at the main gate of Fort Benning in 2001, protesters who wish to take their mourning onto the post need to go over, under, or around that fence, as opposed to the simple marching of the past.

At the 2002 protest, the city of Columbus began requiring all attending the event to submit to a metal detector search at the designated entrance. After a lengthy legal battle, however, in October 2004 the Eleventh Circuit Court of Appeals ruled unanimously that the forced search was unconstitutional.

In 2004, the Army added a second fence topped by razor wire, and erected a third fence in 2005.

On November 20, 2005, roughly 20,000 protesters attended the vigil, "remembering those who have been silenced by SOA violence". Forty protesters climbed over or under the fence and were arrested by military police. Columbus police also arrested bystanders, including some who lifted the fence. Since protests against the school began, 183 people have cumulatively served over 81 years in prison for their civil disobedience.

On November 19, 2006, over 22,000 protesters attended the vigil, a record high attendance number. On December 3, 2006, Georgia Public Radio broadcast "The Sounds of Protest at the School of the Americas", an hour-long documentary with audio collected at the 2006 protest. "Sounds of Protest" Audio Documentary

On November 20, 2010, at least 20 people attending the vigil were arrested, including Kaelyn Forde, a journalist from Russia Today, and her cameraman, Jon Conway. They were charged with unlawful assembly, demonstrating without a permit and failing to obey a police order to disperse. Forde and Conway were jailed for 29 hours before they were released the following day on $1,300 bond each. Both workers maintain they were "wrongfully arrested".

Over the years dozens of prominent actors, musicians, and authors have appeared at and participated in SOA Watch demonstrations including musicians Pete Seeger, Amy Ray and David Rovics, Actors Martin Sheen and Susan Sarandon, and poet and author Brett Axel.

In 1994 Richter Productions released a short documentary movie, The School of Assassins, narrated by Susan Sarandon.

In 1999 Zeropanik Press released a poetry anthology, Will Work For Peace, edited by Brett Axel, dedicated to The SOA Watch.

=== Presente! litany ===
The Presente! litany is a memorial litany in which the names of people killed in political repression (usually in Central and South America) are recited. This litany is used at the annual memorial service held at the gates of the School of the Americas in Columbus, Georgia, for those killed by graduates of the school. In Spanish, "Presente" means "here" or "present", when responding to a roll call.

The tradition of reading names of those killed by politically repressive regimes has a long tradition in Latin America. At the funeral of Pablo Neruda on September 25, 1973, in Chile, Hernán Loyola reports that mourners responded with "Presente" (meaning "he/she (the victim) is here") to the shouting out of Neruda's name, as well as that of Salvador Allende, the recently deposed (and killed) president:

Two days later Neruda's body was taken out of the ransacked house. Loyola recollected: "A considerable group of workers and students had gathered outside in the street, and I heard the first shouts: 'Comrade Pablo Neruda!' someone yelled and all the others answered: 'Present!' The cortege left in a defiant column (any massive demonstration was, of course, forbidden) ... and the column grew along the way. Arriving at the general Cemetery along the Avenida de la Paz, the funeral became an impressive popular protest, the first since September 11 ... I confess I was frozen with fear, because the people began singing the Internationale in a crescendo. Suddenly, I found that I had my fist in the air and was singing. Soldiers, armed to the teeth, surrounded the square opposite the cemetery and I sincerely believed that, in a matter of seconds, they would let off a round of machine-gun fire. When someone in a loud voice began to shout: 'Comrade Pablo Neruda!' we all answered 'Present!

The dictatorship of Augusto Pinochet had begun two weeks earlier with the bombardment of the governmental palace, and would last for 17 years.

== ¡Presente! newspaper ==
The movement to close the School of the Americas (formerly known as the SOA Watch Update) publishes a newspaper, ¡Presente!, three times a year which is sent to approximately 50,000 subscribers. The purpose of the newspaper is to give updates about the state of the campaign and of events and developments of the movement.

== See also ==
- Army Foreign Intelligence Assistance Program
- Dorothy Hennessey
- Gwen Hennessey
