= Western Hemisphere Institute for Security Cooperation =

United States Department of Defense school at Fort Benning in Columbus, Georgia

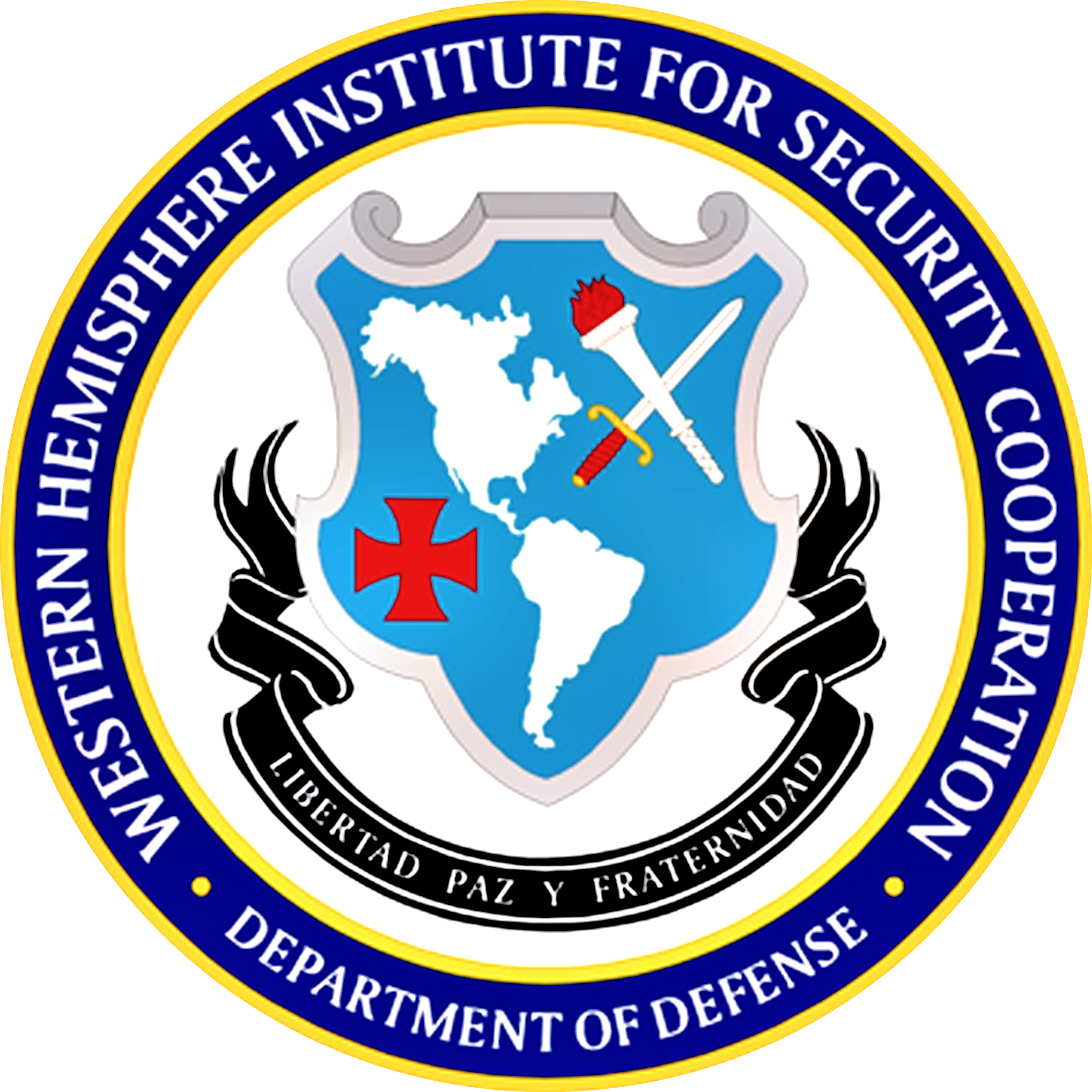
- Official seal
- Motto: Libertad, Paz, y Fraternidad (Freedom, Peace, and Fraternity)
- Commandant: Colonel Michael Rogowski
- Budget: $11.2 million (As of 2018)
- Members: 215
- Owner: United States Army Western Hemisphere Command
- Address: 7301 Baltzell Ave, Bradley Hall, Bldg 396, Fort Benning, Georgia 31905
- Location: Fort Benning, Georgia, United States
- Coordinates: 32°21′54.1″N 84°57′21.25″W
- Interactive map of Western Hemisphere Institute for Security Cooperation
- Website: Official website

The Western Hemisphere Institute for Security Cooperation (WHINSEC), formerly the School of the Americas, is a United States Department of Defense school located at Fort Benning (briefly known as Fort Moore) in Columbus, Georgia. The school was renamed in the 2001 National Defense Authorization Act.

The institute was founded in 1946; by the year 2000, more than 60,000 Latin American military, law enforcement, and security personnel had attended the school. The school was located in the Panama Canal Zone until its expulsion in 1984.

When the institute was still known as the School of the Americas it had what it described as a 'Hall of Fame' honoring its most accomplished alumni. It included Bolivian dictator Gen. Hugo Banzer Suárez, drug lord and dictator Manuel Noriega, and Guatemalan General Manuel Antonio Callejas y Callejas.

As part of the U.S. Army's restructuring initiated in December 2025, the Western Hemisphere Institute for Security Cooperation (WHINSEC) is aligning with the newly created United States Army Western Hemisphere Command (USAWHC). This shift integrates regional security training, education, and partnerships under a single four-star command designed to enhance theater security cooperation and operational focus across the hemisphere.

== History ==
=== Latin American Training Center-Ground Division ===
In 1946, the United States Army founded the Latin American Training Center-Ground Division (Centro de Entrenamiento Latino Americano, Division Terrestre) at Fort Amador in the Panama Canal Zone to centralize the "administrative tasks involved in training the increasing number of Latin Americans attending U.S. service schools in the canal zone." The school trained Latin American military personnel to use artillery and advanced weapons purchased from the United States and provided instruction in nation-building. The army soon renamed the division the Latin American Ground School (Escuela Latino Americana Terrestre) and divided it into three departments: engineering, communications, and weapons and tactics. The school was affiliated with army training schools in Panama that included the Food Service School (Fort Clayton), the Motor Mechanics School (Fort Randolph), and the Medical School (Fort Clayton). Chronic under-enrollment occurred during the school's first few years, as Latin American officials preferred to have personnel trained within the continental United States. Cadets of varying degrees of education and military experience were placed in the same courses. In 1947, discussions of national castes and class divisions in Latin American countries among U.S. officials led to changes in course structure that created separate classes for officers and lower-ranks.

During the 1940s and 1950s, the school sought to prove that the quality of training provided matched or exceeded training provided by institutions within the U.S. When a group of Argentine officers attended a three-month course in 1948, the school painstakingly structured the program to convince them that the U.S. was "enterprising, efficient, and powerful." Administrators leveraged preconceived notions around Argentine racial superiority in Latin America to cultivate feelings of equality between the Argentine officers and their U.S. counterparts.

Scholar Lesley Gill has argued that the Ground School not only trained students, but incorporated them "into the ideology of the 'American way of life' by steeping them in a vision of empire that identified their aspirations with those of the United States."

=== U.S. Army Caribbean School ===
In February 1949, the army consolidated the training schools in the Panama Canal Zone and transferred operations to Fort Gulick. The army changed the name of the Latin American Ground School to the U.S. Army Caribbean School. Some courses were taught in Spanish to accommodate requests from Latin American countries that the school served. The school graduated 743 U.S. military personnel and 251 Latin Americans representing ten countries in 1949.

Mutual defense assistance agreements bound the U.S. Army to the militaries of Latin America by the middle of the 1950s, with only Mexico and Argentina as exceptions. By 1954, the school's pupils were overwhelmingly from Latin American countries due to a decrease in U.S. military personnel in the region, an increased utilization of the school by governments in Latin America, and an agreement that the United States would pay "transportation, per diem and course costs for military trainees from MDAP countries in Latin America." In 1956, English was eliminated as an instructional language and the school adopted Spanish as its official language. Accordingly, the majority of U.S. personnel the school trained between 1956 and 1964 were Puerto Rican.

During this period, the army utilized the school for translation. In 1955, the Department of the Army established the Spanish Translation Review Board within the school to "review new and old translations of U.S. Army Field Manuals prior to publishing to correct grammatical and technical errors and to assist in the standardization of military terms" employed in Spanish-language curricula. In 1961, General Lyman Lemnitzer suggested that Latin American students could be utilized to "review translations to insure conformance with individual country language and practical applicability."

After the 1959 revolution in Cuba, the U.S. Military adopted a national security doctrine under the perceived threat of an "international communist conspiracy." In 1961, President John F. Kennedy ordered the school to focus on teaching "anti-communist" counterinsurgency training to military personnel from Latin America. Broadly, the U.S. offered training to Latin Americans in riot and mob control, special warfare, jungle warfare, intelligence, and counterintelligence, civil affairs, and public information. According to anthropologist Lesley Gill, the label "communist" was a “highly elastic category that could accommodate almost any critic of the status quo."

Nicaraguan Dictator Anastasio Somoza made occasional visits to the school.

==== Curriculum ====
The Department of Internal Defense dealt with "national internal defense", while the Counterinsurgency Committee provided counterinsurgency training in ten-week and two-week courses. According to the Department of Defense, the school provided intelligence and counter-intelligence training to "foreign military personnel" under the Mutual Assistance Program. It also trained military police and maintained a close relationship with the Inter-American Police Academy. As part of an effort to emphasize "nation building and economic growth through military civic action," the school taught "technical skills applicable to civic action programs."

=== School of the Americas ===
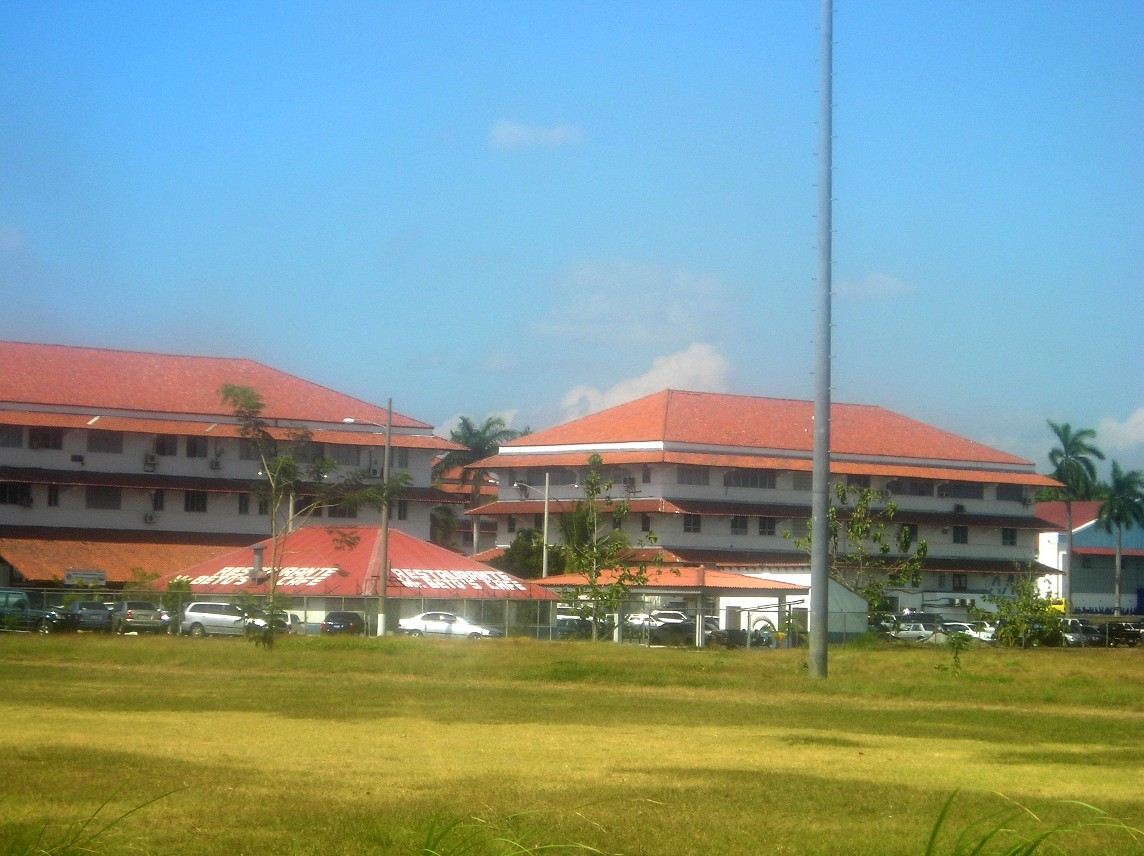
The grounds of the school in Panama, photographed post-closure in 2006

In 1963, officials renamed the facility the U.S. Army School of the Americas "to better reflect its hemispheric orientation."

By its closure in 2000, The USARSA had graduated 60,428 officers, cadets, noncommissioned officers, police and civilian defense officials from 22 Latin American countries and the United States.

During the mid-1960s, the school was one of several institutions through which the U.S. Army augmented "training in jungle warfare". The Department of Defense reported to President Lyndon B. Johnson that 180 students from the Continental U.S. Base had been trained in 1965, including 60 from the 1st Cavalry Division deployed in the Republic of Vietnam.

The Jungle Operations Course included in-field exercises. For example, in 1966

a company of 103 students from Panama and 4 other Latin American countries enrolled in the Jungle Operations Course, U.S. Army School of the Americas, Fort Gulick, Canal Zone, recently completed a 9 day tactical exercise crossing the Isthmus of Panama, a ground distance of about 55 miles, through jungle, swamp and water. Symbolically following in the footsteps of Spanish explorers 300 years ago, the crossing began with an amphibious landing on the Pacific side of the Isthmus. The exercise ended with the last student completing the trek by emptying a container of Pacific Ocean Water into the Caribbean. The 9 day exercise emphasized jungle operations and tactics and techniques of combat in this environment. The U.S. Army School of the Americas' Jungle Operations Committee supervised and controlled the maneuver.

Heightened tensions in Southeast Asia increased demand for "jungle operations techniques". In 1966, the army ordered the Commander, U.S. Army Forces Southern Command, to augment the school's Jungle Operations Course to accommodate more students. Specifically, these new students were to be soldiers "enroute to assignments in units serving in the Republic of Vietnam." A feedback-loop created between the school and General Westmoreland's headquarters allowed the Army to ensure that "lessons learned" in Vietnam were incorporated into the curriculum. Scholar J. Patrice McSherry has argued that methods derived from Vietnam and incorporated into the curriculum included "torture techniques and other dirty war methods". Further, the school leveraged instructors returning from service in Vietnam to "insure currency of the instruction". As new techniques were developed and adopted, the military became increasingly protective of course content. According to one scholar, by the mid-to-late 1960s "trainees required security clearances even to view the course descriptions of military intelligence courses."

The counterinsurgency manuals that the school used for instruction were produced during the Army's Project X, established under the Foreign Intelligence Assistance Program in 1965–66, which relied on knowledge produced during the Central Intelligence Agency's Phoenix Program. According to Major Joseph Blair, a former instructor at the school, "the author of SOA and CIA torture manuals [...] drew from intelligence materials used during the Vietnam War that advocated assassination, torture, extortion, and other 'techniques'." McSherry argues that the authors of the manuals "believed that oversight regulations and prohibitions applied only to U.S. personnel, not to foreign officers." Use of the manuals was suspended under President Jimmy Carter over concerns about their correlation to human rights abuses.

Despite Carter's worries about the school's training materials, he believed that the international military education and training provided by the School of the Americas, among other institutions, was critical to furthering "the national interests of the United States". He considered the training conducted in Panama to be essential because it enhanced American "access to the politically influential leadership" of the Panamanian National Guard and instilled in its personnel "attitudes favorable to the United States". Further, he believed the training served to "increase respect for United States foreign policy goals and the United States concept of military-civilian relationships at the national level". To justify his decision to "provision international military education and training" to Panama in 1980, Carter argued that not doing so would "endanger the future operation" of the School of the Americas and the Inter-American Air Force Academy. Training manuals suspended under Carter were re-introduced into the school's curriculum under the Reagan Administration in 1982.

During the 1970s, the quantity of trainees sent by Latin American dictatorships backed by the United States increased greatly. Between 1970 and 1979, cadets from Chile, Colombia, Bolivia, Panama, Peru, and Honduras made up sixty-three percent of the school's students. In the late 1970s, civil wars and communist revolutions intensified the Central American crisis. In 1980, the United States increased economic aid to Honduras, which remained relatively stable compared to other Central American countries. Journalist Ray Bonner reported that much of this aid would go toward training military officers at the School of the Americas and to training programs within the continental United States. Hundreds of Hondurans were trained at the school during the 1980s, when the country became increasingly critical to President Ronald Reagan's efforts to overthrow and defeat the Nicaraguan Sandinistas and other revolutionary guerrilla movements in the region. The surge in trainees during the 1980s marked the second wave of Hondurans to be trained by the school. The first wave took place between 1950 and 1969, when 1000 Honduran cadets were trained at the school or other facilities within the United States.

During the 1980s, Mexico, El Salvador, and Colombia made-up seventy two percent of the school's cadets.

On September 21, 1984, the school was expelled from Panama under the terms of the Panama Canal Treaty. Prior to this expulsion, politicians and journalists in Panama had complained that civilian graduates from the school engaged in repressive and antidemocratic behavior. The army considered relocating the school to Fort Allen in Juana Díaz, Puerto Rico, ultimately choosing Fort Benning (briefly known as Fort Moore), Georgia, where it re-opened in December 1984 as part of the U.S. Army Training and Doctrine Command.

In 1989, the school established a policy on human rights instruction and revised its curriculum to integrate human rights training. According to the school, cadets received between four and forty hours of human rights training depending on their length of attendance. Instructors received sixteen hours of human rights training before they began to teach.

As the Cold War drew to a close around 1991, the foreign policy of the United States shifted focus from anti-communism to the war on drugs, with narcoguerillas replacing communists. The focus later shifted again to terrorism. Now, all elements of the School of the Americas are located at Fort Benning with the exception of the Helicopter School Battalion which is located at Fort Rucker, Alabama.

==== Congressional criticism and debate ====
In 1993, a released list of 60,000 graduates confirmed that "dictators, death squad operatives, and assassins" had been educated at the SOA. Two bills to cut funding to the school were rejected by the House of Representatives in 1993 and 1994. These bills were introduced by Rep. Joseph P. Kennedy II with the intent to close the school by eliminating the amount of funding dedicated to running the school. Despite the rejection of the 1994 bill, legislative action that year required a report on the school's promotion of respect for human rights and civilian authority. This request was included in the Foreign Operations Appropriations measure for fiscal year 1995. The report required explanation of how the "School of the Americas IMET program" would "contribute to the promotion of human rights, respect for civilian authority and the rule of law, the establishment of legitimate judicial mechanisms for the military, and achieving the goal of right sizing military forces."

In 1995, the House Appropriations Committee urged the Department of Defense to continue its ongoing efforts to incorporate human rights training into the School of the Americas regular training curriculum, as well as to employ stringent screening processes to potential students to ensure that they had not carried out past human rights abuse. That same year, Rep. Joseph P. Kennedy II introduced bill H.R. 2652, which sought "to close the School of the Americas and establish a U.S. Academy for Democracy and Civil-Military Relations." The bill stalled in January 1996 while awaiting executive comment from the Department of Defense.

Again in 1996, the committee urged the Department of Defense to continue efforts to incorporate human rights training into the regular curriculum and to monitor the human rights performance of its graduates. A report regarding the school's selection process and monitoring of human rights practices of its graduates, as well as examples in which graduates made significant contributions to democracy-building and improved human rights practices, was requested by the House Appropriations Committee in 1996.

In September 1996, the Pentagon made training manuals used by the School of the Americas available to the public and confirmed publicly that tactics conveyed in the manuals "violated American policy and principles." The Pentagon declared that all copies of the manuals had been destroyed apart from a single copy retained by its general counsel. An investigation was undertaken to ensure that the school's contemporary intelligence and counterintelligence materials were in "complete compliance with law, regulations and policy." Rep. Joseph P. Kennedy II stated that the manuals confirmed that "taxpayer dollars have been used to train military officers in executions, extortion, beatings and other acts of intimidation – all clear civil rights abuses which have no place in civilized society." Rep. Nancy Pelosi addressed the issue in the congressional record:

For years, some of us have had serious questions about the Army's School of the Americas and its connection to some of the worst human rights violators in our hemisphere. Last weekend, information released by the Pentagon confirmed our worst suspicions: U.S. Army intelligence manuals, distributed to thousands of military officers throughout Latin America, promoted the use of executions, torture, blackmail, and other forms of coercion. We now have concrete proof of what we had suspected. For almost 10 years, U.S. taxpayer dollars were used to promote an approach that advocates using, and I quote, "fear, payment of bounties for enemy dead, beatings, false imprisonment, executions, and the use of truth serum".

Congress continued to debate whether or not to close the school throughout 1997. In February, Representative Kennedy introduced another bill, H.R. 611, that sought to close the school. Instead of pressing for the establishment of the U.S. Academy for Democracy and Civil-Military Relations, the bill urged the Department of Defense to create an Inter-American Center for Defense Studies in order to "provide professional training and education relevant to defense management in a democratic constitutional context." Senator Dick Durbin introduced a similar bill, S.980, into the senate in June. That same month, the Department of Defense submitted the report previously requested to address screening and monitoring of the school's students. The House Appropriations Committee noted that the report was delivered six months beyond its deadline and criticized its content as "woefully inadequate". The report divulged that the screening and selection processes of school candidates differed between countries and that each country was responsible for screening and selecting candidates. According to the report, the names of selected candidates were sent to the "appropriate [U.S.] mission offices and agencies", who were expected to run their own background checks on the candidates. It also suggested that the resources required to monitor all 60,000 graduates were not available.

In July, the House Appropriations Commission reported that the House version of the foreign operations appropriation bill required major reforms before funding would be provided to the school.

In September, numerous senators entered statements in the congressional record to support or close the School of the Americas. Rep. Sanford Bishop, whose district includes the school, argued for keeping it open:

I am proud of the school. All Americans should be. It has provided professional training to thousands of military and civilian police personnel from throughout Latin America, including extensive indoctrination in the principles of human rights and representative democracy. For less than $4 million a year, the school promotes democracy, builds stronger relationships with our neighbors, and combats narcotics trafficking. Some handful of the school's graduates have committed terrible crimes, but over 68,000 have been on the front lines of the move toward democracy in Latin America. The school has undergone a series of investigations and studies, and all confirm that it has been a force for good in our hemisphere. I urge all of my colleagues to visit the school, learn more about the job it is doing, and not to rush to judgment on the basis of false and unfounded accusations made by people who may have good intentions, but who have little regard for the facts. Mr. Speaker, I urge our colleagues to support the truth. Support the School of the Americas.

Rep. Joseph P. Kennedy II entered a counterargument into the congressional record:

Mr. Speaker, in the next couple of hours, this House will have the opportunity of closing down the School of the Americas. This is one of the worst vestiges of this country's foreign policies over the course of the last couple of decades. While the cold war has ended, the association of this country in hundreds of villages throughout Latin America, in thousands of families where human rights abuses have taken place time and time and time again, those who perpetrated those human rights abuses have one thing in common. They were graduates of the School of the Americas. This is a school that is funded by U.S. taxpayers. It has trained the Latin American militaries how to come to this country and learn to kill, torture, and maim more efficiently. It is a school that should never have been associated with U.S. taxpayer funds. It is a school whose time has not only come and gone, but whose time should never have been associated with this country. It is time, I believe, for us to close down the School of the Americas. I ask Members on both sides of the aisle, save the taxpayers money. Close the School of the Americas.

In July 1999, the House of Representatives voted 230–197 to reduce funding for the school by two million dollars. A House-Senate committee voted 8–7 to overturn the vote in the weeks that followed.

=== WHINSEC ===
By 2000, the School of the Americas was under increasing criticism in the United States for training students who later participated in undemocratic governments and committed human rights abuses. In 2000, the US Congress, through the FY01 National Defense Act, withdrew the Secretary of the Army's authority to operate USARSA.

The next year, the institute was renamed to WHINSEC. U.S. Army Maj. Joseph Blair, a former director of instruction at the school, said in 2002 that "there are no substantive changes besides the name. ...They teach the identical courses that I taught and changed the course names and use the same manuals."

In 2013, researcher Ruth Blakeley concluded after interviews with WHINSEC personnel and anti-SOA/WHINSEC protesters that "there was considerable transparency ... established after the transition from SOA to WHINSEC" and that "a much more rigorous human rights training program was in place than in any other US military institution".

However, the first WHINSEC Director, Richard Downie, became the controversial director of the Center for Hemispheric Defense Studies (CHDS), the educational institution of both the U.S. Northern and U.S. Southern Commands (SOUTHCOM), at the National Defense University in Washington, DC. from March 2004–March, 2013. During Downie's tenure at CHDS, the institution faced controversy over its continued employment of a former military officer from Chile, who was later indicted by a civilian court for his alleged participation in torture and murder and who was defended by Downie. In addition, The Intercept reported that Honduran plotters in the illegal 2009 military coup received "behind-the-scenes assistance" from CHDS officials working for Downie. The detailed August 2017 article noted that Cresencio Arcos, a former U.S. ambassador to Honduras who was working at the Center at the time the coup occurred, received an angry call from a Congressional staffer who had met with the Honduran colonels who were meeting with Members of Congress in Washington. The colonels purportedly told the staffer they had the center's support. Arcos confronted Downie and Center Deputy Director Ken LaPlante, telling them, "We cannot have this sort of thing happening, where we're supporting coups." LaPlante was a former instructor at the notorious School of the Americas and an ardent defender of that institution while at what is now called the William J. Perry Center for Hemispheric Defense Studies.

=== Participation ===
Since its opening in 2001, WHINSEC has trained more than 19,000 students from 36 countries of the Western Hemisphere. In 2014–2015, the principal "Command & General Staff Officer" course had 65 graduates (60 male and five female) representing 13 nations: Belize, Canada, Chile, Colombia, Costa Rica, the Dominican Republic, El Salvador, Mexico, Panama, Paraguay, Peru, Uruguay and the U.S.

In 2004, Venezuela ceased all training of its soldiers at WHINSEC after a long period of chilling relations between the United States and Venezuela. On March 28, 2006, the government of Argentina, headed by President Néstor Kirchner, decided to stop sending soldiers to train at WHINSEC, and the government of Uruguay affirmed that it would continue its current policy of not sending soldiers to WHINSEC.

In 2007, Óscar Arias, president of Costa Rica, decided to stop sending Costa Rican police to the WHINSEC, although he later reneged, saying the training would be beneficial for counter-narcotics operations. Costa Rica has no military but has sent some 2,600 police officers to the school. Bolivian President Evo Morales formally announced on February 18, 2008, that he would not send Bolivian military or police officers to WHINSEC. In 2012, President Rafael Correa announced that Ecuador would withdraw all their troops from the military school at Ft. Benning, citing links to human rights violations.

In 2005, a bill to abolish the institute, with 134 cosponsors, was introduced to the House Armed Services Committee. In June 2007, the McGovern/Lewis Amendment to shut off funding for the Institute failed by six votes. This effort to close the institute was endorsed by the Council on Hemispheric Affairs, which described the Institute as a "black eye" for America.

=== Commandants ===
==== USCARIB School ====
- Col. Cecil Himes (1959–1961).
- Col. Edgar W. Schroeder (1961–1963)

(According to another source, Cecil Himes was commandant from 1958 to 1961.)

==== School of the Americas ====
- ? (1964–1972)
- Col. John O. Ford (June 1968-January 1971)
- Col. Joseph Villa (around 1973)
- ? (1973–1984)
- Col. Michael J. Sierra (1984–1985) (transfer from Fort Gulick, Panama to Fort Benning, GA)
- Col. Miguel A. García (1985–1988)
- Col. William DePalo (1989–1991)
- Col. José Feliciano (1991–1993)
- Col. José Álvarez (1993–1995)
- Col. Roy R. Trumble (1995–1999)
- Col. Glenn R. Weidner (1999–2000)

==== WHINSEC ====
- Col. Richard D. Downie (2001–2004)
- Col. Gilberto R. Pérez (2004–2008)
- Col. Félix Santiago (2008–2010)
- Col. Glenn R. Huber Jr. (2010–2014)
- Col. Keith W. Anthony (2014–2017)
- Col. Robert F. Alvaro (2017–2019)
- Col. John D. Suggs jr. (2019-)

== Current organization ==
=== Charter ===
Authorized by the United States Congress through 10 U.S.C. § 2166 in 2001, WHINSEC is responsible for providing professional education and training on the context of the democratic principles in the Charter of the Organization of American States (such charter being a treaty to which the United States is a party). According to William J. Lynn III, Deputy Secretary of Defense (March 18, 2010) WHINSEC fosters mutual knowledge, transparency, confidence, and cooperation among the participating nations and promotes democratic values, respect for human rights, and knowledge and understanding of United States customs and traditions. WHINSEC has provided training for more than 10,000 individuals since its existence and over 60,000 US and international students since its original establishment in 1946. Its educational format incorporates guest lecturers and experts from sectors of US and international government, non-government, human rights, law enforcement, academic institutions, and interagency departments to share best practices (as deemed by the USA) in pursuit of improved security cooperation between all nations of the Western Hemisphere.

=== Independent Review Board ===
When the National Defense Authorization Act for 2001 was signed into law, WHINSEC was created. The law called for a federal advisory committee – the Board of Visitors (BoV) – to maintain independent review, observation, and recommendations regarding operations of the institute. The 14-member BoV includes members of the Senate and House Armed Services Committees along with representatives from the State Department, U.S. Southern Command, U.S. Northern Command, the U.S. Army Training and Doctrine Command, and six members designated by the Secretary of Defense. These six members include representatives from the human rights, religious, academic, and business communities. The board reviews and advises on areas such as curriculum, academic instruction, and fiscal affairs of the institute. Their reviews ensure relevance and consistency with US policy, laws, regulations, and doctrine.

Members of the Board are not compensated by reason of service on the Board.

=== Board of Visitors ===
As of August 2018, board members include:

- Chairman, Senate Armed Services Committee, Sen. Jim Inhofe, or his designee
- Ranking minority member of the SASC, Sen. Jack Reed, or his designee
- Chairman, House Armed Services Committee, Rep. Mac Thornberry, or his designee; (Rep. Austin Scott [Ga-8] is the current designee.)
- Ranking minority member of the HASC, Rep. Adam Smith, or his designee.
- The Secretary of State designates a Deputy Assistant Secretary of State, usually from the Bureau of Western Hemisphere Affairs.
- Commander, U.S. Southern Command, Adm. Kurt W. Tidd or his designee
- Commander, U.S. Northern Command, Gen. Terrence J. O'Shaughnessy or his designee
- Commanding General, U.S. Army Training and Doctrine Command, Gen. Stephen J. Townsend, or his designee
- Dr. Dafna H. Rand, Adjunct Professor at the Near East South Asia Center for Strategic Studies, National Defense University
- Archbishop Timothy Broglio, Archbishop for the Military Services
- Dr. Frank Mora, Director, Kimberly Green Latin American and Caribbean Center and Professor in the Department of Politics & International Relations at Florida International University.
- Amb. (Ret) Carmen Maria Martinez, United States diplomat and career foreign service officer. She served as the U.S. Ambassador to Zambia from 2005 to 2008.
- Hon. Dan Trimble, U.S. Immigration Judge
- LTG(R) Ken Keen, Associate Dean for Leadership Development at Emory University's Goizueta Business School

== Criticism ==
=== Accusations of human rights violations by alumni ===
The School of the Americas has been blamed for human rights violations committed by former students. By the early 1980s, Latin American critics accused the school of teaching techniques of repression to be used toward civilians.

According to the Center for International Policy, "The School of the Americas had been questioned for years, as it trained many military personnel before and during the years of the 'national security doctrine' – the dirty war years in the Southern Cone and the civil war years in Central America – in which the armed forces within several Latin American countries ruled or had disproportionate government influence and committed serious human rights violations in those countries."

The institute itself explicitly denies accusations of teaching torture as of at least 1999: in that year the School of the Americas FAQ had several answers denying accusations of torture, such as "Q: What about the accusations that the School teaches torture and murder? A: Absolutely false. The School teaches U.S. Army doctrine which is based on over 200 years of success, and includes a variety of military subjects, none of which include criminal misconduct." WHINSEC says that its curriculum includes human rights, and that "no school should be held accountable for the actions of its graduates."

Human Rights Watch says that "training alone, even when it includes human rights instruction, does not prevent human rights abuses."

=== SOA Watch ===
Since 1990, Washington, DC–based nonprofit human rights organization School of the Americas Watch has worked to monitor graduates of the institution and to close the former SOA, now WHINSEC, through legislative action, grassroots organizing and nonviolent direct action. It maintains a database with graduates of both the SOA and WHINSEC who have been accused of human rights violations and other criminal activity. In regard to the renaming of the institution, SOA Watch claims that the approach taken by the Department of Defense is not grounded in any critical assessment of the training, procedures, performance, or results (consequences) of the training programs of the SOA. According to critics of the SOA, the name change ignores congressional concern and public outcry over the SOA's past and present link to human rights atrocities.

=== Protests and public demonstrations ===
Since 1990, SOA Watch has sponsored an annual public demonstration of protest of SOA/WHINSEC at Ft. Benning. In 2005, the demonstration drew 19,000 people. The protests are timed to coincide with the anniversary of the assassination of six Jesuit priests in El Salvador in November 1989 by graduates of the School of the Americas. On November 16, 1989, these six Jesuit priests (Ignacio Ellacuría, Segundo Montes, Ignacio Martín-Baró, Joaquín López y López, Juan Ramón Moreno, and Amado López), along with their housekeeper Elba Ramos and her daughter Celia Marisela Ramos, were murdered by the Atlácatl Battalion on the campus of the University of Central America in San Salvador, El Salvador, because they had been labeled as subversives by the government. A United Nations panel concluded that nineteen of the 27 killers were SOA graduates.

=== Graduates of the School of the Americas ===
The U.S. Army School of the Americas is a school that has run more dictators than any other school in the history of the world.

— Congressman Joseph P. Kennedy II

A number of graduates of the SOA and WHINSEC have been accused and sentenced for human rights violations, genocide, crimes against humanity and other criminal activity in their home countries.

In response to Freedom of Information Act requests, records were released regarding graduates of the school. In August 2007, according to an Associated Press report, Colonel Alberto Quijano of the Colombian Army's Special Forces was arrested for providing security and mobilizing troops for Diego León Montoya Sánchez (aka "Don Diego"), the leader of the Norte del Valle Cartel and one of the FBI Ten Most Wanted Fugitives. School of the Americas Watch said in a statement that it matched the names of those in the scandal with its database of attendees at the institute. Alberto Quijano attended courses and was an instructor who taught classes on peacekeeping operations and democratic sustainment at the school from 2003 to 2004.

Other former students include Salvadoran Colonel and Atlácatl Battalion leader Domingo Monterrosa and other members of his group who were responsible for the El Mozote massacre, and Franck Romain, former leader of the Tonton Macoute, which was alleged to be responsible for the St. Jean Bosco massacre. Honduran General Luis Alonso Discua was also a graduate of the school who later on commanded Battalion 3-16, a military death squad.

According to an article in Human Rights Review, training statistics show that Argentina, a country that engaged in much anti-Communist sentiment and violence during the Dirty War during the Cold War era, had a relatively small number of military personnel educated at the school.

In 2018, two of the highest officers of the Venezuelan Army, Minister of Defense Vladimir Padrino López and SEBIN director Gustavo González López, were sanctioned by the United States for human rights abuses against opposition protesters and dissidents, corruption leading to the economic collapse of the country, and drug trafficking charges. They were found to have been students of psychological operations courses at SOA in 1995 and 1991 respectively.

For the Fiscal Year 2021 a total of 1,193 students trained at WHINSEC with the highest number of those students coming from Colombia (697).

Notable Graduates
Country	Graduate	About
Argentina	Emilio Eduardo Massera	Argentine Navy officer, and a leading participant in the Argentine coup d'état of 1976.
Argentina	Jorge Rafael Videla	Senior commander in the Argentine Army and dictator of Argentina from 1976 to 1981.
Argentina	Leopoldo Galtieri	Argentine general and President of Argentina from 22 December 1981 to 18 June 1982, during the last military dictatorship.
Argentina	Roberto Eduardo Viola	Argentine military officer who briefly served as president of Argentina from 29 March to 11 December 1981 under a military dictatorship.
Bolivia	Hugo Banzer Suárez	Bolivian politician, military general and President of Bolivia. He held the Bolivian presidency twice: from 1971 to 1978, as a dictator and from 1997 to 2001, as a constitutional President. Under Banzer's seven-year dictatorship, hundreds of Bolivians were murdered, deported, and/or tortured, while more than 4,000 were imprisoned or detained as political prisoners.
Bolivia	Luis Arce Gómez	Bolivian colonel who backed the coup that brought General Luis García Meza to power. Arce served as García Meza's Minister of the Interior.
Bolivia	Juan Ramón Quintana Taborga	Minister of the Presidency under Evo Morales from 2006 to 2009.
Bolivia	Hernán Terrazas Céspedes	Bolivian politician and military officer. Mayor of Cochabamba and classmate of Hugo Banzer.
Bolivia	Manfred Reyes Villa	Bolivian politician, businessman, and former military officer.
Chile	Raúl Iturriaga	Chilean Army general and a former deputy director of the DINA, the Chilean secret police under the Augusto Pinochet military dictatorship.
Chile	Manuel Contreras	Chilean Army officer and the former head of the National Intelligence Directorate (DINA), the Chilean secret police under the Augusto Pinochet military dictatorship.
Chile	Miguel Krassnoff	Held several high-ranking positions in the Pinochet regime, including in the Chilean intelligence agency, DINA. He was responsible for the interrogation, torture, and disappearance of political prisoners at the detention center, Villa Grimaldi. After Pinochet's demise, Krassnoff was convicted by Chilean courts of crimes against humanity.
Colombia	General Hernán José Guzmán Rodríguez	Offered protection and support to Muerte a Secuestradores, a paramilitary group responsible for 147 murders between 1987 and 1990.
Colombia	Captain Gilberto Ibarra	Forced peasant children to lead his patrol through a minefield. Two children were killed and one wounded.
Colombia	General Rito Alejo del Rio	Linked to paramilitary death squads.
Colombia	Nestor Ramirez	Commander of soldiers who beat unarmed protestors.
Colombia	Lt. Col. Luis Bernardo Urbina Sánchez	The former head of Colombia's Department of Administrative Security. Evidence linked him to various human rights violations between 1977 and 1989, including kidnapping, torture, and murder.
Ecuador	Guillermo Rodríguez	Military dictator of Ecuador from February 15, 1972, to January 11, 1976.
El Salvador	Roberto D'Aubuisson	Extreme-right Salvadoran soldier, politician and death-squad leader. In 1981, he co-founded and became the first leader of the Nationalist Republican Alliance (ARENA) and served as President of El Salvador's Constituent Assembly from 1982 to 1983. He was a candidate for President in 1984, losing in the second round to José Napoleón Duarte. He was named by the UN-established Truth Commission for El Salvador as having ordered the assassination of then-Archbishop Saint Óscar Romero in 1980.
El Salvador	Domingo Monterrosa	Salvadoran Colonel and Atlácatl Battalion leader who led the El Mozote massacre in El Salvador in 1981.
El Salvador	Col. Roberto Mauricio Staben	Commander of the Salvadoran Arce Immediate Reaction Infantry Battalion that carried out the El Mozote Massacre. Involved in a kidnapping-for-profit ring active in the mid-1980s.
El Salvador	Col. Francisco del Cid Díaz	Implicated in the 1983 Las Hojas massacre
Guatemala	Hector Gramajo	General in the Guatemalan Army who served as Defense Minister from February 1, 1987, to May 20, 1990, during the long years of the Guatemalan Civil War (1960–1996). Responsible for rape and torture of Sister Dianna Ortiz.
Guatemala	Efraín Ríos Montt	Former President of Guatemala who took power as a result of a coup d'état on March 23, 1982. In 2012, he was indicted for genocide and crimes against humanity in a Guatemalan court.
Guatemala	Marco Antonio Yon Sosa	Leader of the Revolutionary Movement 13th November and participant in the 1960 military uprising against president Miguel Ydígoras.
Guatemala	Col. Julio Roberto Alpirez	Guatemalan Army official and CIA intelligence asset. In 1992, Alpirez received $44,000, nearly forty-six times the average yearly income in Guatemala, from the CIA for his intelligence work. He allegedly oversaw the murder of American citizen Michael Divine and Guatemalan citizen Efrain Bamaca.
Guatemala	Otto Pérez Molina	Member of the group of army officers who backed Defence Minister Óscar Mejía's coup d'état against de facto president Efraín Ríos Montt.
Haiti	Franck Romain	Former leader of the Tonton Macoute accused of being responsible for the St. Jean Bosco massacre.
Haiti	Raul Cedras	Dictator of Haiti, leader of military junta after the 1991 Haitian coup d'état.
Honduras	Juan Carlos Bonilla Valladares	Charged with drug trafficking and related weapons offenses in April 2020 by the U.S. He was also accused of killing for President Juan Orlando Hernández in a cocaine trafficking scheme.
Honduras	General Luis Alonso Discua Elvir	First commanding officer of the Battalion 316 death squad.
Honduras	Humberto Regalado	Former Honduran Chief of Staff linked to Colombian drug smuggling operations.
Honduras	Jesus A Marmol Yanes	The Office of the Special Prosecutor for Human Rights accused Marmol Yanes of cover-up and abuse of authority in the killing of 15-year-old Ebed Jassiel Yanes Caceres in 2012 (2013 report).
Honduras	Juan Rubén Girón Reyes	Was one of those charged with the cover up of Ebed Yanes’ death. According to one soldier they were ordered by Giron to pick up the shell casings and to not speak of what happened.
Honduras	Reynel Funes Ponce	In 2013 he was accused of withholding information about the killing of Ebed Yanes. He allegedly ordered that the weapons used in the incident be exchanged to cover up the killing.
Honduras	Herberth Bayardo Inestroza Membreño	Denied that the forced removal of President Zelaya was a coup by saying “It was a fast operation. It was over in minutes, and there were no injuries, no deaths. We said, ‘Sir, we have a judicial order to detain you.’ We did it with respect.” Later he admitted to the Miami Herald that the act of removing Zelaya from the country went beyond the scope of the judicial order. "In the moment that we took him out of the country, in the way that he was taken out, there is a crime. Because of the circumstances of the moment this crime occurred, there is going to be a justification and cause for acquittal that will protect us."
Honduras	Luis Javier Prince Suazo	During the 2009 coup as head of the Honduran Air Force he arranged for President Zelaya to be flown into exile
Honduras	Gustavo Alvarez Martínez	A 1997 CIA study identified the Honduran Anti-Communist Liberation Army, or ELACH, as a "death squad" with close ties to a special security unit reporting to Alvarez. In 1983, a dissident Honduran Army officer accused Alvarez of masterminding "death squads." In 1994 a lawyer appointed by the Honduran parliament to investigate human rights abuse blamed the Honduran army for 174 disappearances and kidnappings in the 1980s. Most of the incidents took place before the 1984 ouster of Alvarez. In 1984 Alvarez was accused by his fellow generals of abuse of power and sent into exile.
Mexico	Los Zetas	Though the Mexican and US Governments have never released a full list, several sources claimed that many of the initial 34 founders of Los Zetas were GAFE Special Forces Operators trained at SOA throughout the late 80s to early 90s.
Panama	Omar Torrijos	Commander of the Panamanian National Guard and the de facto dictator of Panama from 1968 to 1981. Torrijos was never officially the president of Panama, but instead held titles including "Leader of the Panamanian Revolution" and "Chief of Government." Torrijos took power in a coup d'état and instituted a number of social reforms.
Panama	Manuel Noriega	Panamanian politician and military officer who was the de facto ruler of Panama from 1983 to 1989. He had longstanding ties to United States intelligence agencies; however, he was removed from power by the U.S. invasion of Panama.
Peru	Juan Velasco Alvarado	Left-wing Peruvian General who served as the 58th President of Peru during the dictatorship from 1968 to 1975
Peru	Vladimiro Montesinos	Former long-standing head of Peru's intelligence service, Servicio de Inteligencia Nacional (SIN), under President Alberto Fujimori.
Peru	Ollanta Humala	Peruvian politician who served as the 65th President of Peru from 2011 to 2016.
Venezuela	Vladimir Padrino López	Minister of Defense for the National Armed Forces of the Bolivarian Republic of Venezuela under Nicolás Maduro. Sanctioned by the United States for human rights abuses against opposition protesters and dissidents, corruption leading to the economic collapse of the country, and drug trafficking charges. Attended psychological operations courses at SOA in 1995.
Venezuela	Gustavo González López	Venezuelan Minister of Popular Power for Interior, Justice and Peace (MPPRIJP) from 2015 to 2016. Current director of the National Intelligence Service (SEBIN). Sanctioned by the United States for human rights abuses against opposition protesters and dissidents, corruption leading to the economic collapse of the country, and drug trafficking charges. Attended psychological operations courses at SOA in 1991.
Venezuela	Nestor Reverol	Venezuelan Minister of Popular Power for Interior, Justice and Peace. Former Commander of the Venezuelan National Guard (BNG) from 2014 to 2016. Responsible for killings and torture of Protesters during his tenure as BNG Commander. Sanctioned by the United States for human rights abuses against opposition protesters and dissidents, corruption leading to the economic collapse of the country, and drug trafficking charges. Attended psychological operations courses at SOA in 1996.

== Media representation ==
- School of the Americas Assassins, a 1994 short documentary film produced by Robert Richter. It was nominated for an Academy Award for Best Documentary Short
- Hidden in Plain Sight, a 2003 feature-length documentary film produced by Andrés Thomas Conteris, Vivi Letsou, and John Smihula
- The War on Democracy, a 2007 documentary film produced by Youngheart Entertainment PTY Limited
- The Empire Files: The U.S. School That Trains Dictators and Death Squads, a 2015 documentary produced by Abby Martin and broadcast on teleSUR
- El Conde, a 2023 Chilean fictional film by Pablo Larrain

== See also ==
- Army Foreign Intelligence Assistance Program
- Death squad
- Dorothy Hennessey
- Gwen Hennessey
- Latin America–United States relations
- Operation Condor
- School of the Americas Watch
- United States Army Command and General Staff College
- United States Southern Command (SOUTHCOM)
- War on drugs
