= Boutros Salim AbouNader =

Lebanese civil aviation pilot

Boutros Salim AbouNader (born 20 May 1932) is a Lebanese former civil aviation pilot. He was one of the first four Lebanese pilots to achieve the rank of captain in any airline, and has worked for Middle East Airlines (MEA) for over 35 years.

In 1951 Boutros began work as an air traffic controller for Beirut airport, where he remained until 1955. He then moved to the America to train for his Private Pilot License (PPL), his Commercial Pilot License (CPL), his Instrument Flight (IFL) qualification and his Multi-Engine Rating (MER) qualification which he completed between 1955 and 1957. He then moved back to Lebanon to fly for MEA.

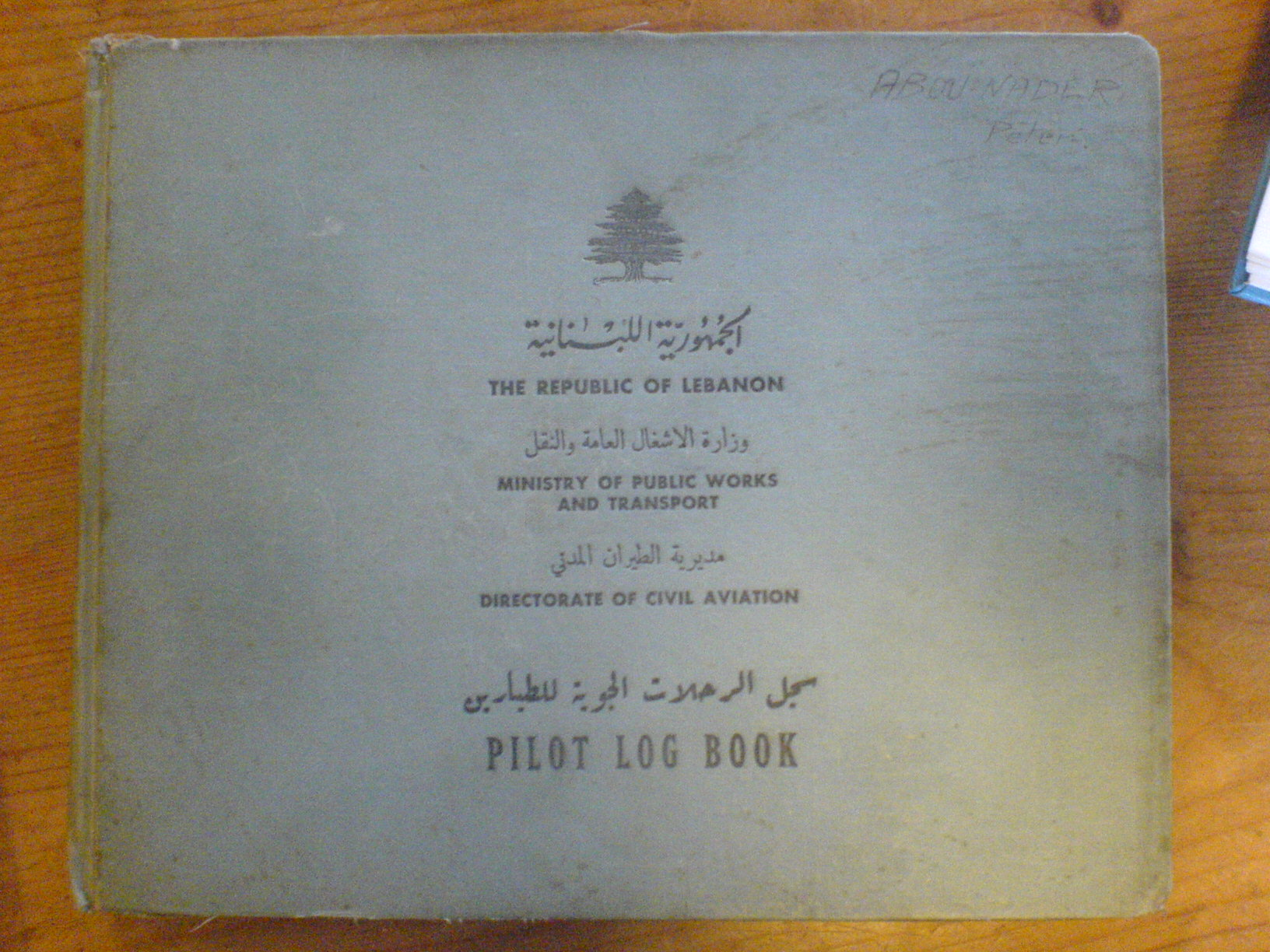
Final Log Book Cover

Although he only flew three flights in a Douglas DC-3 as a trainee co-pilot before becoming a first officer in 1957; this was not uncommon for the time. He continued to fly DC-3s until 1958, when he flew as a co-pilot on the Avro York and then a Vickers Viscount in 1959. He remained flying the latter as a co-pilot until 3 February 1965, when he flew his first flight as captain. This coincided with a move to the de Havilland Comet 4C.

In May 1965 Boutros flew the first aircraft onto the new asphalt runway of Dubai International Airport as part of the official opening ceremony. In 1963 he had been the co-pilot of a Vickers Viscount which accidentally landed on the uncompleted new runway of Heliopolis Airport, prior to its re-opening as Cairo International Airport.

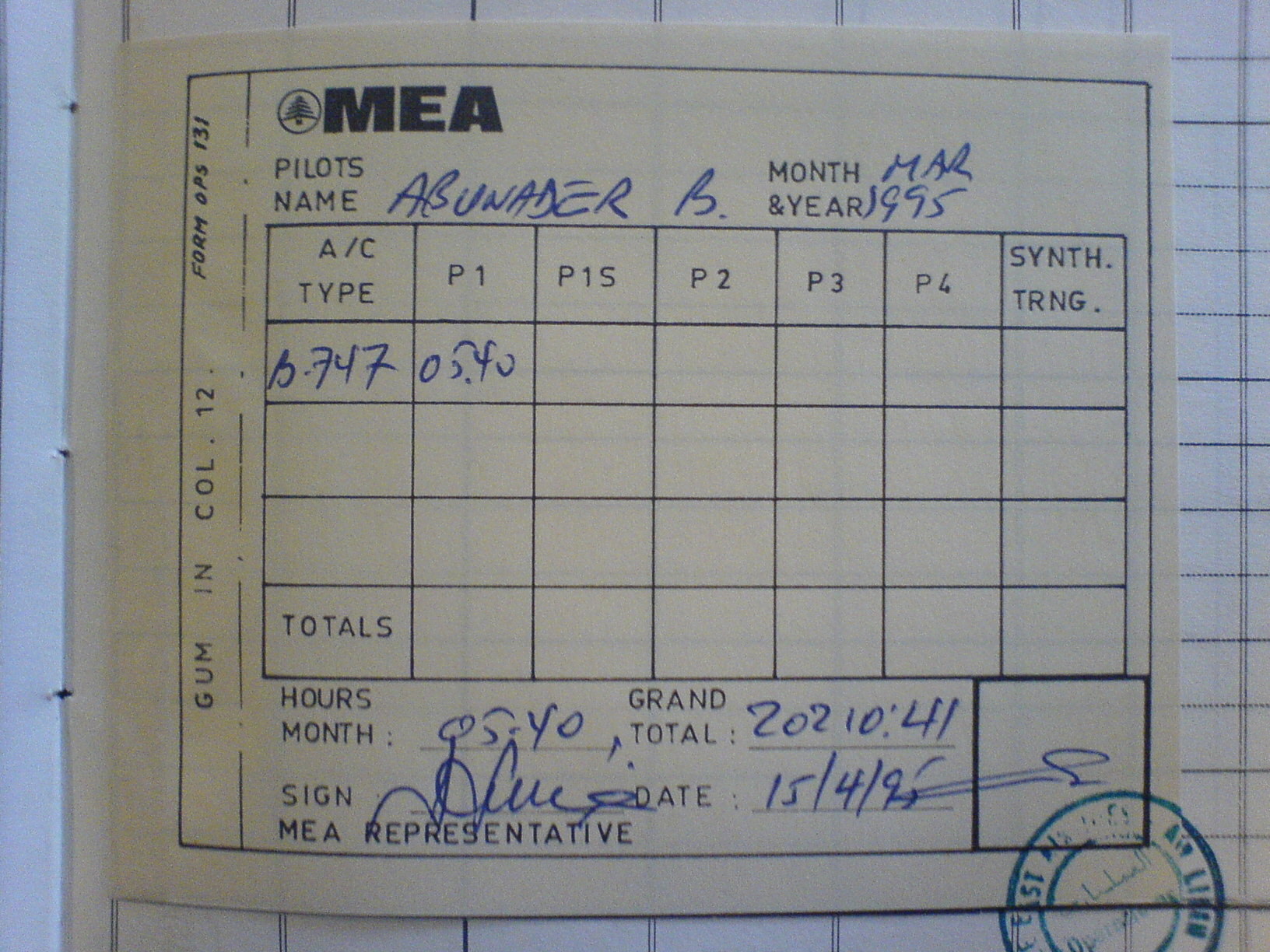
Final Log Book Stamp

He then went on to pilot the Convair CV-990A and Boeing 707 in 1968 and 1969 due to the destruction of 13 MEA aircraft in December 1968 as the result of an Israeli commando raid. MEA extended its fleet in 1975 to include a number of Boeing 747-200B and Boutros flew one of the first two of these aircraft from Seattle to Beirut International Airport. On 4 April 1975 he was made a Knight of the Order of the Cedar for services to national aviation.

In 1992 he had reached MEAs standard retirement age of 60, having flown for the airline since 16 December 1957. However, due to a lack of qualified check-and-training pilots, the airline extraordinarily renewed his contract for this role until 1995, whereupon they again extended his contract to enable him to remain with the airline in his current part-time advisory role.

During his time with MEA he became the assistant vice-president of operations, the vice-president of operations and services and the vice-president of special assignments. He flew for over 20,000 air hours and approximately 7,000 simulation hours.
