= Dorothy Hennessey =

American Catholic nun and peace activist (1913–2008)

Dorothy Marie Hennessey, O.S.F., (March 24, 1913 – January 24, 2008) was an American Catholic Franciscan Religious Sister and activist involved with the Peace and Justice movement.

== Biography ==
Hennessey was born on a farm near Manchester, Iowa, the eldest of the thirteen children of Maurice Hennessey and Anna Killias. She was 19 years older than her younger sister, Sister Gwen Hennessey, O.S.F., who is also a Franciscan Sister and activist. As a young woman, she entered the Sisters of the Third Order of St. Francis of the Holy Family, based in Dubuque, Iowa.

Hennessey was drawn to the Peace and Justice movement and the School of the Americas Watch by her brother, Ronald Hennessey, a Maryknoll priest who served as a missionary in Latin America from 1964 until his death in 1999. Her brother wrote letters to his family describing his life in Guatemala and El Salvador. In the 1980s, his letters recounted how Mayan Indians in his parish were being terrorized and killed by Guatemalan military squads. Father Ron later befriended Archbishop Oscar Arnulfo Romero of El Salvador, and when the Archbishop was assassinated, Father Ron wrote of his funeral in the Cathedral when the Salvadoran military fired on the mourners.

Hennessey's views began to shift to a view more critical of her government's policies in Latin America. This stand became more public when she agreed to participate in the "Peace Walk across the United States" in her 70s to protest the U.S. Cold War buildup in that region. She led protests at Fort Benning, Georgia, home of the Army's School of the Americas, a facility for training Latin American soldiers. Hennessey believed that the School of the Americas teaches torture techniques to Latin American soldiers and that graduates of the program have been involved in atrocities, including the 1989 murders of Jesuits in El Salvador. The school denies these claims and argues that it helps to spread democracy in Latin America.

Dorothy Hennessey, along with Gwen Hennessey, was arrested and convicted to six months in federal jail for their protest in 2001. She was 88 years old at the time.

In 2002, Dorothy and Gwen Hennessey were jointly awarded the Pacem in Terris Award. It is named after a 1963 encyclical letter by Pope John XXIII that calls upon all people of good will to secure peace among all nations. Pacem in terris is Latin for 'Peace on Earth.'

Hennessey died on January 24, 2008, aged 94. At the time of her death she resided at a Dubuque, Iowa, retirement home of her religious congregation.
