= Julia Boutros =

Lebanese singer (born 1968)

- جوليا بطرس
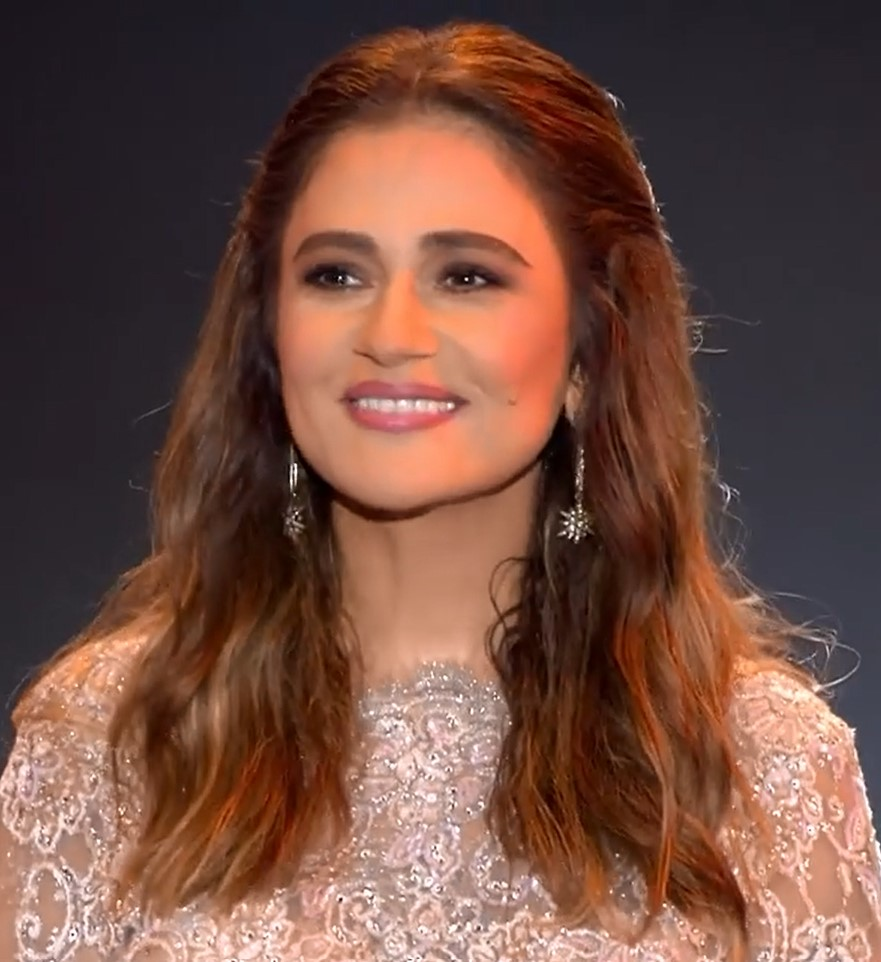
- Boutros in 2016
- Born: Julia Khalil Boutros; April 1, 1968 (age 58); Beirut, Lebanon
- Occupations: Singer; musician; philanthropist
- Years active: 1980–present
- Spouse: Elias Bou Saab
- Children: 2
- Musical career
- Genres: Pop; pop rock; Arab pop; world music
- Instruments: Vocals; oud
- Labels: Rotana Music; Universal Music Enterprises (UME); AlJamahiriya Music; EMI Music Arabia; EMI Music France; Music Master; independent
- Website: www.juliaboutros.net

Julia Khalil Boutros (Arabic: جوليا خليل بطرس, romanized: Jūliyā Khalīl Buṭrus; born April 1, 1968) is a Lebanese singer, musician, and humanitarian activist.

Over a career spanning more than four decades, she has released numerous critically acclaimed albums and singles that blend traditional Middle Eastern melodies and quarter notes with modern pop and pop rock. Known for her patriotic and resistance-themed songs, she is popularly known as "The Lioness of Lebanon" for her vocal support of Lebanese and Palestinian causes through her music.

== Early life ==
Boutros was born in Beirut on April 1, 1968, into a Maronite Christian family. Her father hails from the coastal city of Tyre in South Lebanon, while her mother is of Palestinian descent with an Armenian background. She attended Rosary Sisters Schools, where she sang in the school choir. Her early exposure to music was heavily influenced by her brother Ziad Boutros and the works of Lebanese composer Ziad Rahbani.

== Music career ==
Boutros began her musical journey at the age of 12 when she recorded her first song, "À Maman," at Elias Rahbani's studio. She followed this with two other French-language songs, "C'est la vie" and "Viens dans ma vie." Her career took off in the 1980s with Arabic-language hits such as "Ghabet Shams El Haq" ("The Sun of Justice Has Set") and "Wein el Malayeen" ("Where Are the Millions").

In October 2006, she released the single "Ahibaii" ("Dearly Beloved"), inspired by a letter written by Hezbollah leader Hassan Nasrallah to fighters during the 2006 Lebanon War. The song was composed by her brother Ziad and arranged by Michel Fadel.

In December 2023, during the Gaza war, she released a song titled "Yamma Mwel Lhawa" ("O Mother, What's with the Wind?") in solidarity with Palestinians.

=== Musical style and influences ===
Boutros is known for blending traditional Arabic melodies and quarter notes with modern pop and rock. Her work often incorporates themes of resistance, patriotism, and social justice. She cites Ziad Rahbani as a major influence on her artistic vision.

== Personal life ==
Boutros is married to former Lebanese Defense Minister and current Deputy Speaker of Parliament Elias Bou Saab, with whom she has two sons.

== Cultural reception ==
Boutros' music has been well-received across both the Near and Middle East, with her songs often resonating deeply with audiences in Lebanon, Syria, and Palestine. Her ability to blend traditional Arabic melodies with modern styles has contributed to her widespread appeal.

== Humanitarian activism and philanthropy ==
Boutros has used her music as a platform to support humanitarian causes. In 2006, she donated $3 million from the sales of "Ahibaii" to help families affected by the 2006 Lebanon War. The funds were distributed to families of Hezbollah fighters, Lebanese soldiers, and civilians who lost their lives during the conflict.

In addition to her support for Lebanon, Boutros has been a vocal advocate for Palestinian rights. She released songs like "Al-Haq Silahi" ("Righteousness Is My Weapon") to express solidarity with Palestinian resistance movements. During the Gaza war in December 2023, she performed "Yamma Mwel Lhawa" ("O Mother, What's with the Wind?"), a song dedicated to Palestinians enduring hardship.

Boutros' philanthropic efforts extend beyond her music. She has participated in fundraising campaigns and charity events to aid refugees and victims of war across the Middle East.

In July 2007, Lebanese president Émile Lahoud named Boutros an Officer of the National Order of the Cedar for her initiatives and artistic work in support of the national cause.

Boutros' defense of Lebanon led to her being popularly known as "The Lioness of Lebanon".

== Legacy ==
Julia Boutros is widely regarded as one of Lebanon's most iconic singers. Her patriotic songs have become anthems for resistance movements across the Arab world, particularly in Lebanon, Palestine, and Syria. Songs such as "Ghabet Shams El Haq" and "Ahibaii" are often associated with themes of resilience, unity, and defiance in the face of conflict.

Boutros' ability to combine traditional Arabic melodies with contemporary styles has earned her a loyal fan base spanning multiple generations. Her music is often played at national events, protests, and cultural celebrations throughout the Arab world.

Beyond her music, Boutros is celebrated for her humanitarian efforts and unwavering commitment to social justice. She is often described as a cultural symbol of resilience and hope in the face of adversity. Her influence extends beyond Lebanon, making her a prominent figure in Arab cultural history.

== Notable performances ==
Julia Boutros has performed at numerous iconic venues and events throughout her career. Here are some of her most notable performances:

Performance	Year	Notes
Live at Casino Du Liban	2008	A live concert showcasing patriotic repertoire.
Live at Casino Du Liban (+DVD)	2010	A live album and DVD capturing an iconic performance at Casino Du Liban.
Casino Du Liban Concert	2013	A performance featuring stirring renditions of her most popular songs.
Live at Platea	2012	Performed a mix of classics and contemporary hits.
Live at Waterfront City Dbayeh	2016	Highlighted emotional connection with fans.
Live in Tyre	2018	Dedicated to South Lebanon's resilience.
Concert in Damascus Citadel	2008	Performed in Syria’s historic Damascus Citadel, singing about love and war during a period of improving Lebanese-Syrian relations.
Ahibaii Charity Tour	2008	A charity tour to raise funds for victims of the 2006 Lebanon War, with performances in Lebanon, Qatar, the UAE, and Syria.
Concert at the American University of Dubai	2006	A charity concert performed to a full house, showcasing her humanitarian efforts and vocal prowess.

== Discography ==
Album title	Release year	Label	Notes
C'est la vie (This Is the Life)	1982	EMI Music	Julia's debut album featuring French-language songs.
Ghabet Shams El Haq (The Sun of Justice Has Set)	1985	AlJamahiriya Music	Includes patriotic themes that established Julia as a voice of resistance.
Wain Msafer (Where Are You Travelling To?)	1987	Universal Music MENA	A blend of emotional ballads and traditional Arabic influences.
Hikayet Aatab (A Story of Lament)	1991	Music Master	A seminal album that solidified Julia's place in Arabic pop.
Kosass (Stories)	1994	Music Master	Features storytelling through music with deep emotional undertones.
Al Karar (The Decision)	1996	Music Master	Known for its powerful lyrics and patriotic themes.
Shi Gharib (Something Unusual)	1998	Music Master	Explores new musical styles while maintaining her signature sound.
Bisaraha (Honestly)	2001	Rotana Music	A commercially successful album with heartfelt ballads.
La B'ahlamak (Never in Your Dreams)	2004	Rotana Music	Features themes of love and longing, resonating deeply with fans.
Ta'awadna Aaleik (We're Used to You)	2006	Rotana Music	Includes the hit single Ta'awadna Aaleik.
Yawman Ma (Someday)	2012	Independent	Reflects on themes of hope and resilience.
Miladak (Your Christmas)	2012	Independent	A festive album celebrating the spirit of Christmas.
Hkayet Watan (The Story of a Country)	2014	Independent	Dedicated to Lebanon, showcasing Julia's patriotic spirit.
Ana Meen (Who Am I?)	2016	Independent	Explores personal identity and self-reflection.
Julia chante Elias Rahbani	2023	Universal Music MENA	Pays tribute to the works of Elias Rahbani.

== Videography ==
Video title	Year	Notes
Live at Casino Du Liban	2008	A live performance showcasing Julia's powerful vocals and patriotic repertoire. Filmed at the iconic Casino Du Liban.
Live at Platea 2012	2012	A concert featuring a mix of Julia's classic hits and new releases. Available on DVD.
Live at Platea 2014	2014	This live concert includes stirring renditions of patriotic anthems and beloved classics, filmed at Platea, Lebanon.
Live at Waterfront City Dbayeh	2016	A memorable performance held at Waterfront City Dbayeh, highlighting Julia's emotional connection with her audience.
Live in Tyre 2018	2019	Filmed during two sold-out performances in Tyre, Lebanon. Features iconic songs like "Ghabet Shams El Haq" and "Hak Sillahi."

== Awards and honors ==
Award	Year	Notes
National Order of the Cedar (Officer Rank)	2007	Awarded by Lebanese President Émile Lahoud for her artistic achievements and dedication to national causes.
Arab Music Award	2010	Recognized for her contributions to Arabic music.
Cultural Ambassador Award	2018	Honored by the Lebanese diaspora for promoting Lebanese culture internationally.

== See also ==
- Fairuz, "The Voice of Lebanon"
