= Salim Ghazal =

Lebanese Catholic bishop (1931–2011)

Salim Gazal
- Titular Bishop of Edessa in Osrhoëne dei Greco-Melkiti; Auxiliary Bishop of the Patriarchate of Antiochia in Syria
- See: Patriarchate of Antiochia
- In office: June 22, 2001 – April 14, 2005
- Previous post: Superior General of the Basilian Salvatorian Order (1995–2001)

Orders
- Ordination: June 22, 1958
- Consecration: August 5, 2001

Personal details
- Born: July 7, 1931 Machghara
- Died: April 29, 2011 (aged 79)

Salim Gazal (July 7, 1931 – April 29, 2011) was a Lebanese bishop in the Melkite Greek Catholic Church. He was the auxiliary bishop of the Patriarchate of Antioch from 2001 to 2005.

== Biography ==
Gazal was born in Machgara, Lebanon. He was ordained a priest in the Arrouhbaniat Albassiliat Almoukhalissiat (Order of the Savior, also known as the Basilian Salvatorian Order) on June 22, 1958. In 1962 Father Ghazal was assigned to an area near Sidon, Lebanon. There he was involved in inter-religious cooperation as a religion teacher to both Christian and Muslim students. He arranged with the sheikh who was leading the Islam classes to learn and teach each other's material.

In 1990 Gazal and like-minded Muslims and Christians founded the Center for Dialogue and Development. The center sponsors symposiums, lectures, conferences and weekly discussion groups to encourage inter-religious cooperation. The organization also supports a retirement home, works with Habitat for Humanity to offer no-profit homeownership loans and offers computer training and Internet access.

Gazal served as Apostolic Administrator of Sidon (Lebanon) from 1985 to 1987. He was the Superior General of the Basilian Salvatorian Order from July 17, 1995, to June 22, 2001.

On June 22, 2001, Gazal was named Titular Bishop of Edessa in Osrhoëne and Auxiliary Bishop of the Patriarchate of Antioch in Syria. He was ordained a bishop on August 5, 2001, by Patriarch Grégoire III Laham, B.S. The principal co-consecrators were Archbishops Georges Kwaïter, B.S. of the Archeparchy of Saida and Jean Mansour, S.M.S.P., Auxiliary Bishop of the Patriarchate of Antiochia.

From 2001 to 2006 Bishop Gazal served as Bishop of the Melkite Curia. In 2001 Bishop Ghazal became the first national chairman for Habitat for Humanity Lebanon. His resignation as auxiliary bishop was accepted on April 14, 2005. He received the Pacem in Terris Peace and Freedom Award in 2007 for his 50-year commitment to Muslim-Christian dialogue.

In April 2011 Bishop Gazal succumbed to illness. Following the outpouring of grief and admiration for his life's work from all spheres of the Lebanese spectrum, the President of the Republic bestowed upon Bishop Ghazal the rank of Commander of The National Order of the Cedar. At the request of Bishop Ghazal he was interred at his beloved Monastery of the Holy Saviour in Saida, Lebanon.
