= School of the Americas Assassins =

1994 film

- Directed by: Robert Richter
- Written by: Robert Richter
- Produced by: Robert Richter
- Starring: Father Roy Bourgeois
- Narrated by: Susan Sarandon
- Edited by: Bruce Follmer
- Production companies: Richter Productions, Inc.
- Distributed by: Maryknoll World Productions
- Release date: 1994
- Running time: 13 minutes
- Country: United States
- Language: English

School of the Americas Assassins is a 1994 American short documentary film about human rights abuses by graduates of School of the Americas. Produced by Robert Richter, it was nominated for an Academy Award for Best Documentary Short.
