= Gwen Hennessey =

American Catholic nun and peace activist (born 1932)

Gwen Hennessey, O.S.F., (born 1932) is an American Catholic Franciscan Sister and peace activist, most widely known for her protests against the School of the Americas.

== Biography ==
Hennessey was born on September 29, 1932, on a farm in Buchanan County, Iowa. Her parents were Anna Killias Hennessey and Maurice Hennessey. She was the thirteenth of fifteen children born to her parents. Their parents modeled generosity to the poor, sheltering tramps who needed food during the depression. Several of Hennessey's siblings would go on to have religious vocations. Her older sisters Dorothy and Miriam became Franciscan nuns, and her brother Ron Hennessey became a priest.

Hennessey graduated from St Patrick's school in Ryan, Iowa, in 1948. She took a year off from school to help her mother, then attended college at Briar Cliff College in Sioux City, where she earned a degree in education and English literature. She joined the Franciscan order in 1956.

She took part in a protest march in the 1960s in Antioch, Illinois. African Americans were banned from the city, and Martin Luther King Jr. was marching with her. She also helped Cesar Chavez, leader of the United Farm Workers, organize migrant workers in California.

Hennessey taught in Chicago, Illinois, and studied at the Jesuit School of Theology in Chicago (JSTC). While living in Chicago, she began to participate in the nuclear disarmament movement as a member of the grassroots activist organization, Clergy and Laity Concerned (CALC). Established in 1965 to organize religious leaders against the Vietnam war, by the 1970s CLAC had broadened to address a range of social justice issues, including the proliferation of nuclear weapons.

Hennessey returned to Iowa in the 1980s where she helped establish the Catholic Peace Ministry, in Des Moines, and continued to be active in a variety of peace related activities. She then moved to New York City where she earned a master's degree from the Maryknoll School of Theology in New York, and worked as co-director of the Maura Clarke/Ita Ford Center. She later worked at the Appalachian Office of Justice and Peace, before returning to Dubuque, Iowa.

Hennessey began serving as the live-in director of the Clare Guest House, in Sioux City, in 2005.

== School of the Americas Protest ==
In the 1990s, Hennessey became involved the School of the Americas Watch, through her brother Ron, who served as a missionary in Latin America from 1964 until his death in 1999. She joined protests at Fort Benning, Georgia, home of the Army's School of the Americas, a facility for training Latin American soldiers. Protesters had targeted the military training program because they believed instructors taught torture techniques to Latin American military leaders and soldiers. Graduates of the program had been accused of several high-profile atrocities, including the 1989 murders of six Jesuit priests and two women in El Salvador. The school denied these claims and argued that it helped to spread democracy in Latin America.

Hennessey protested repeatedly at the school, beginning in 1997. In 2000, along with her sister, Dorothy, and 13 other women activists, she was arrested and convicted for trespassing. They, along with 3500 protesters, had participated in a mock funeral procession in front of the school. As this was a repeat offense, and after refusing a lighter punishment, she was sentenced to six months in jail. She served the full sentence at the Federal Prison Camp [FPC] in Pekin, Illinois. Her sister Dorothy, at age 88, also refused a lighter sentence of house arrest, and was given a six-month jail term. She served for forty five days at the federal camp, then was moved to Elm Street Correctional Facility in Dubuque, Iowa. She was later assigned to do community service caring for people living with AIDS, in Cedar Rapids, Iowa.

Protests against the school garnered lots of publicity and the school was closed in 2000. It re-opened under the new name of Western Hemisphere Institute for Security Cooperation (WHISC).

== Awards ==
In 1997, Hennessey was given the Bishop Dingman Peace Award by Catholic Peace Ministry. Iowa senator Tom Harkin was the keynote speaker at the award program.

In 2002, Gwen and Dorothy Hennessey were awarded the Pacem in Terris Award by the Davenport Catholic Interracial Council. The award was named after a 1963 encyclical letter by Pope John XXIII that calls upon all people of good will to secure peace among all nations. Pacem in terris is Latin for 'Peace on Earth'.
