= Gods of Metal (film) =

1982 film

- Produced by: Robert Richter
- Production company: Richter Productions
- Distributed by: Maryknoll Films
- Release date: 1982
- Country: United States
- Language: English

Gods of Metal is a 1982 American short documentary film produced by Robert Richter for the Maryknoll Fathers and Brothers on nuclear disarmament. It was nominated for an Academy Award for Best Documentary Short.
