= Lesley Gill =

American anthropologist

Lesley Gill is an author and a professor of anthropology at Vanderbilt University. Her research focusses on political violence, gender, free market reforms and human rights in Latin America, especially Bolivia. She also writes about the military training that takes place at the School of the Americas and has campaigned for its closure. She has campaigned with Witness for Peace.

== Education and work ==
Gill has a B.A. from Macalester College (1977), and an M.A. (1978), M.Phil. (1980) and Ph.D. (1984) from Columbia University. She was a visiting fellow at the University of East Anglia from 1984 to 1985. Formerly at the American University in Washington, she moved in 2008 to Vanderbilt to chair the Department of Anthropology. Gill is one of a handful of Editors responsible for the Dialectical Anthropology academic journal.

== Publications ==
=== Books ===
- Peasants, Entrepreneurs, and Social Change: Frontier Development in Lowland Bolivia. Boulder: Westview Press (May 20, 1987). ISBN 0813373395.
- Precarious Dependencies: Gender, Class, and Domestic Service in Bolivia. New York: Columbia University Press (1994). ISBN 023109647X.
- Teetering on the Rim: Global Restructuring, Daily Life, and the Armed Retreat of the Bolivian State. New York: Columbia University Press (2000). ISBN 0231118058.
- The School of the Americas: Military Training and Political Violence in the Americas. Durham: Duke University Press (2004). ISBN 978-0822333920.
- A Century of Violence in a Red City: Popular Struggle, Counterinsurgency, and Human Rights in Colombia. Durham: Duke University Press (2016). ISBN 978-0822374701.

=== Articles ===
- "Disorder and Everyday Life in Barrancabermeja." ColombiaInternacional, vol. 73 (Jan.-Jun. 2011), pp. 49–70. doi:10.7440/colombiaint73.2011.03.
- "History, Politics, Space, Labor: On Unevenness as an Anthropological Concept," with Sharryn Kasmir. Dialectical Anthropology, vol. 40 (Apr. 22, 2016), pp. 87–102. doi:10.1007/s10624-016-9416-7.
