= Paolo Gerometta =

Italian general (born 1955)

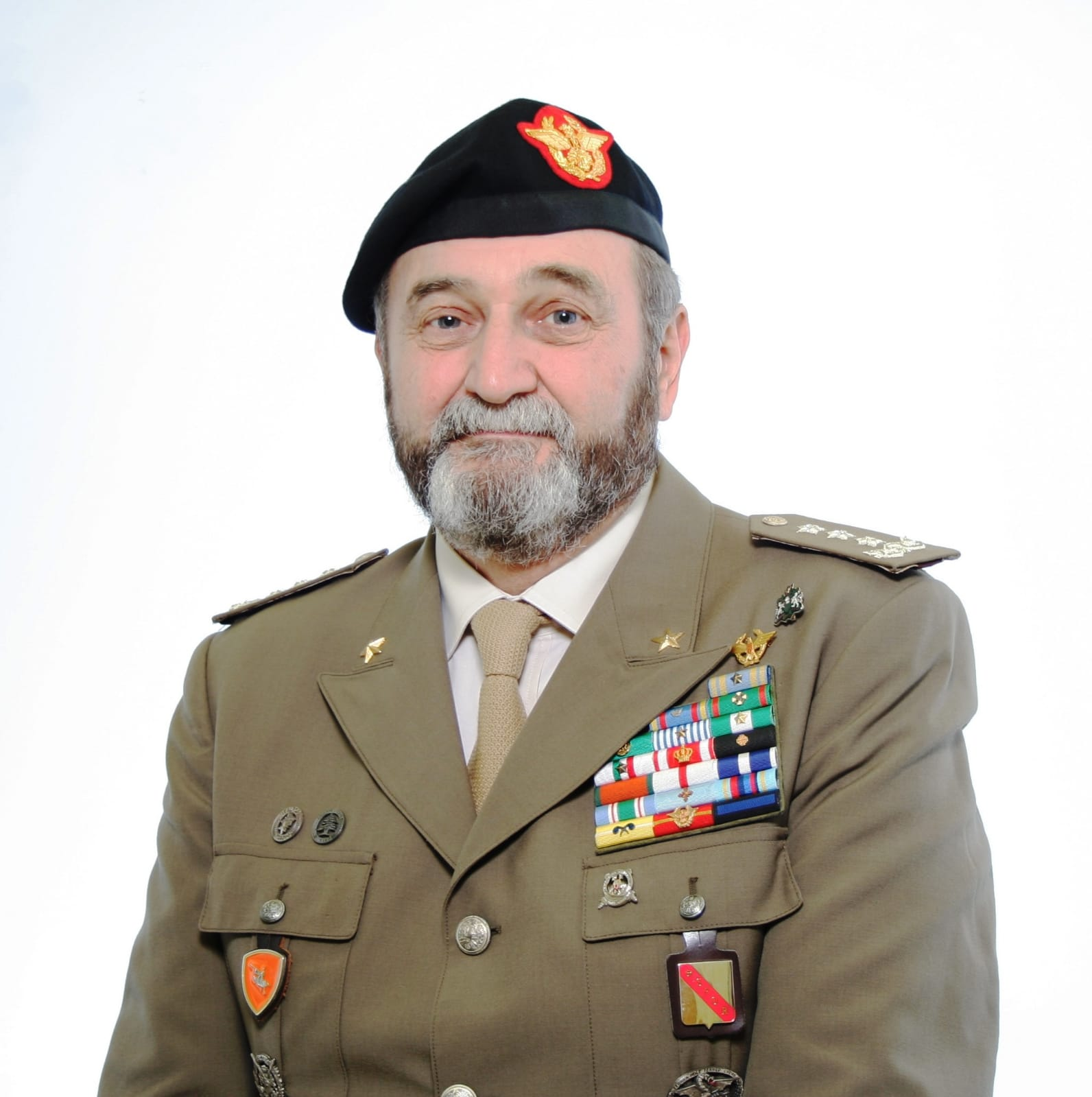
- Born: September 7, 1955 (age 71); Venice, Italy
- Military career
- Allegiance: Italy
- Branch: Italian Army
- Service years: 1974 – 2018
- Rank: Lieutenant General
- Commands: 90th Commander of the “Savoia Cavalleria” Regiment Chief of the Defence General Staff Recruitment, Status and Promotion Office; 72nd Commander of the “Pozzuolo del Friuli” Cavalry Brigade Chief of the Personnel Legal and Financial Affairs Department

Paolo Gerometta (born 7 September 1955) is a former senior Italian army officer.

== Military service ==
In October 22, 1974 he attended the 156th Military Academy course and in 1976 became Cavalry Officer. After completing the application school and obtaining the rank of Lieutenant, in 1978 he was assigned to the “Lancieri di Novara” 5th Tank Squadron Group at Codroipo (UD), where he covered Staff positions and also commanded several Leopard tank units at platoon and squadron levels. In 1988-1989, he attended the 113th Staff Course and was then assigned to the Army General Staff Recruitment, Status and Promotion Office. In 1991-1992, he attended the 113th advanced Staff Course. From September 1993 to September 1994, he commanded the 1st Squadron Group of the 4th “Genova Cavalleria” Regiment. Moreover, he was at the head of a Squadron Group belonging to the “Pozzuolo del Friuli Brigade” within Operation “Vespri Siciliani” .

At the end of this mission, he was reassigned to the Army General Staff Recruitment, Status and Promotion Office, where he was in charge of:
- the section liaising with the organizations representing military personnel;
- the section dealing with Recruitment, Status and Promotion issues of NCOs, Volunteers, as well as with female recruitment and the so-called “Army professionalization”.

On July 1, 1998, he was promoted to the rank of Colonel and on September 11, 1999, became the 90th Commander of the “Savoia Cavalleria” Regiment. In such a position, he commanded Task Force “Sauro” (“Savoia Cavalleria” Regiment plus 3rd Tank battalion), within Operation “Joint Guardian” in Kosovo from October 26, 1999 to March 8, 2000. From September 2000 to September 2004 he was Chief of the Defence General Staff Recruitment, Status and Promotion Office, dealing with legislative matters concerning the professionalization of the military instrument. Moreover, from December 2001 to September 2004 he was a member of the Consultative Committee to the Chief of the Defence General Staff and to the Commanding General of the Guardia di Finanza (Finance Police), as regards female military service.

On January 1, 2004, he was promoted Brigadier General and on January 14, 2006, he became the 72nd Commander of the “Pozzuolo del Friuli” Cavalry Brigade and from November 8, 2006 to April 22, 2007, he served as Commander of the Italian Contingent in Lebanon and of UNIFIL Sector West. On October 19, 2007, he stepped down as Commander of the Cavalry Brigade and on October 22, 2007, took up the position of Chief of the Personnel Legal and Financial Affairs Department at the Army General Staff. On July 1, 2009, he was promoted Major General, still covering the position of Chief of the above-mentioned Department.

From July 13, 2012 (until July 15, 2018), after being elected to the Military Representation Central Council (COCER), was appointed President of the Army branch.

On September 8, 2016, he was promoted Lieutenant General, still covering the position of the Personnel Legal and Financial Affairs Department at the Army General Staff.

Paolo Gerometta left active military service on June 30, 2018.

== Academic Titles ==
- degree in Strategic Sciences from the University of Turin, where he also obtained a 2nd level master's degree

- degree in Political Sciences (historical/political matters) from the University of Trieste.

From January to December 2005, he also attended the Royal College of Defence Studies in London.

== Personal life ==
Gerometta origins are from Anduins, a small village in the Val D’Arzino (Pordenone - Italy). Paolo Gerometta is married to wife Roberta Zamborlini and they have two sons: Giovanni and Lorenzo.

He is member of FIDAL as Master 55 runner, besides he is an amateur mountain biker.

== Medals and decorations ==
Bronze Medal for Army valour;

Silver Cross for Army Merit;

Commander of the Order of Merit of the Italian Republic;

Knight of the National Order of the Cedar (Lebanon);

Spanish Army Cruz del Merito Militar con Distantivo Blanco;

Knight of the Equestrian Order of the Holy Sepulchre of Jerusalem;

Commander for merit with Silver Plaque of the Holy Military Constantinian Order of St.George;

Mauritian Medal for Merit, 50 years of Military Service;

Silver Medal for Length of Command;

United Nations medal for service in Lebanon;

NATO medal for service in Kosovo.
