= Ali Wehbi =

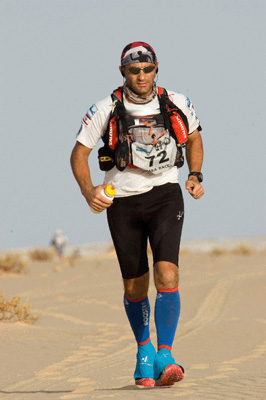

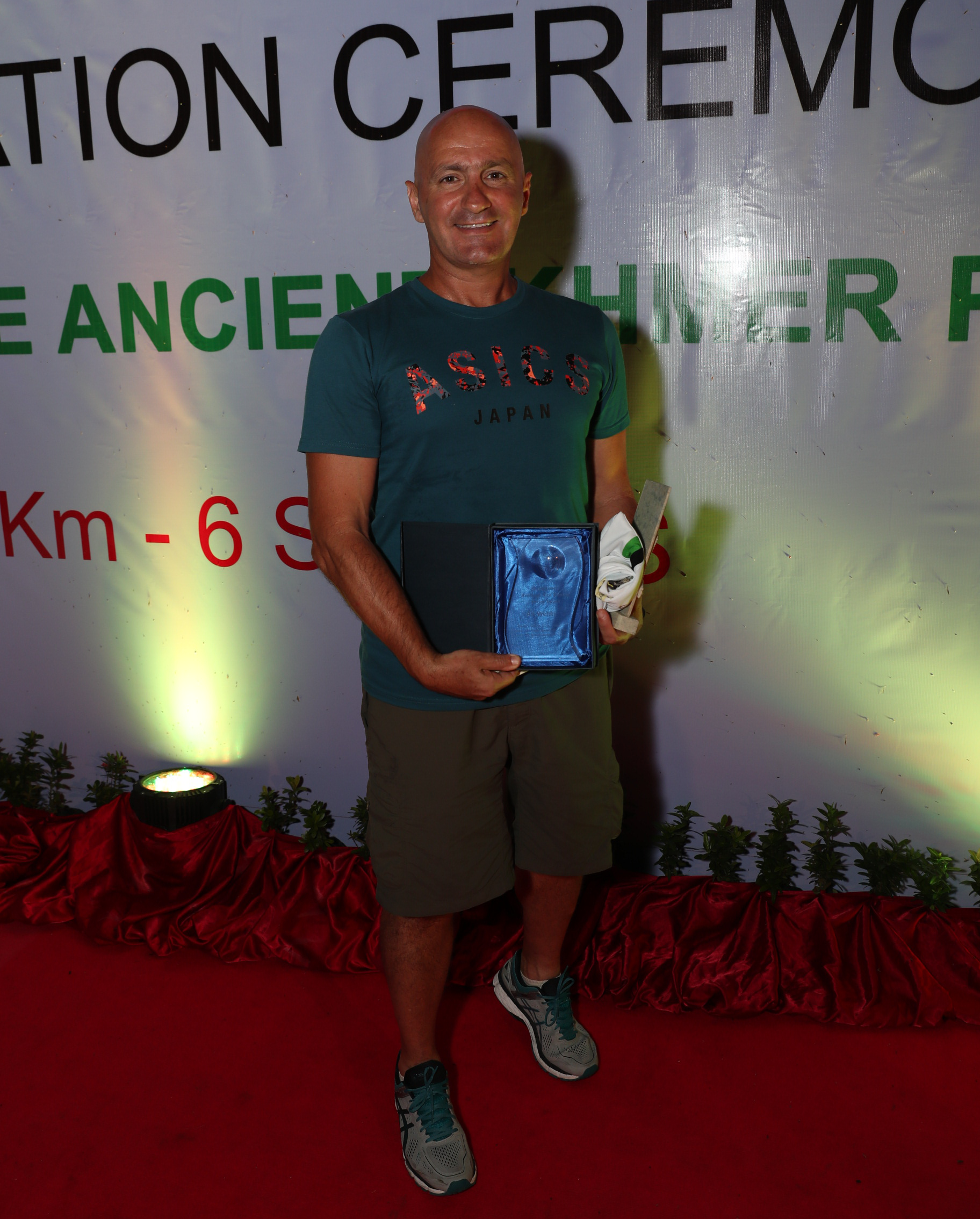

Ali Wehbi is an extreme runner and racer who was the first Lebanese and Arab to complete the 4 Deserts race.
