= Army Foreign Intelligence Assistance Program =

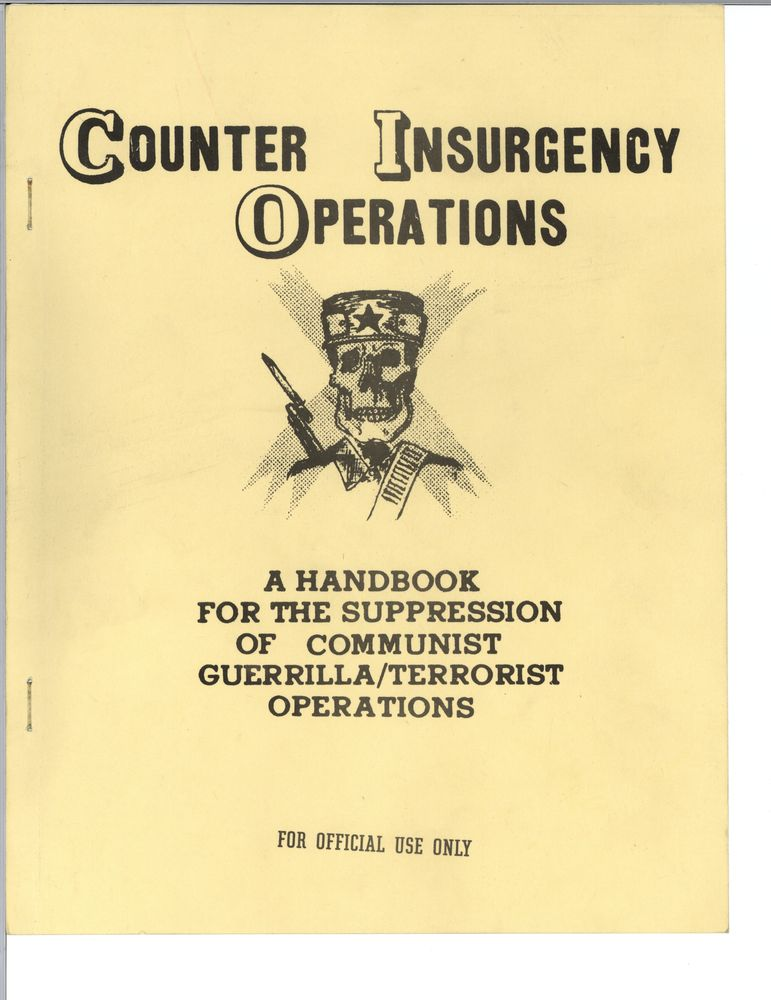
"The majority of government operations can be classified into one or more of the following general types: a) Meeting engagements; b) Attacks; c) Defense; d) Ambushes; e) Raids; f ) Pursuit actions; g) Interception actions; h) Terror Operations."

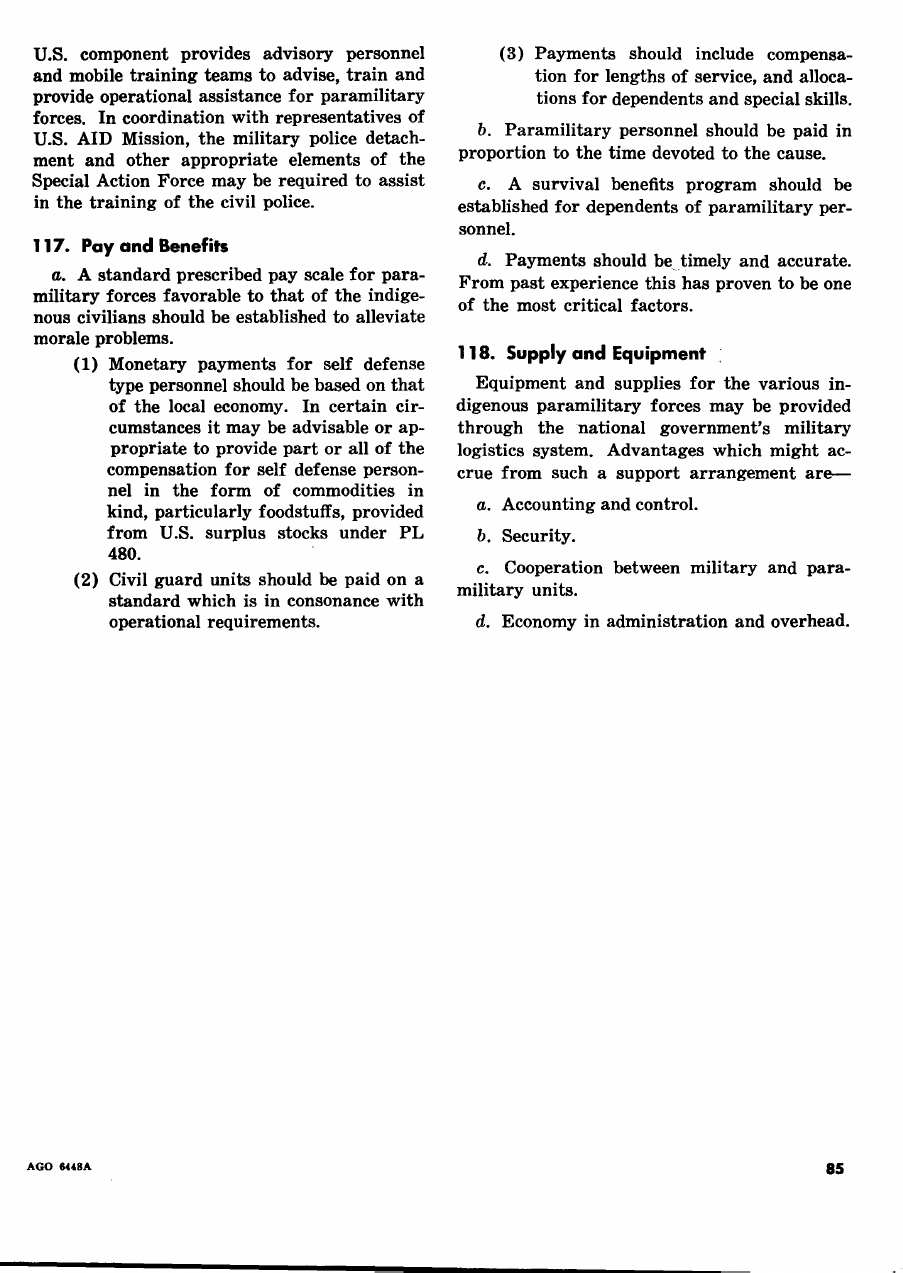
"U.S. component provides advisory personnel and mobile training teams to advise, train and provide operational assistance for paramilitary forces."

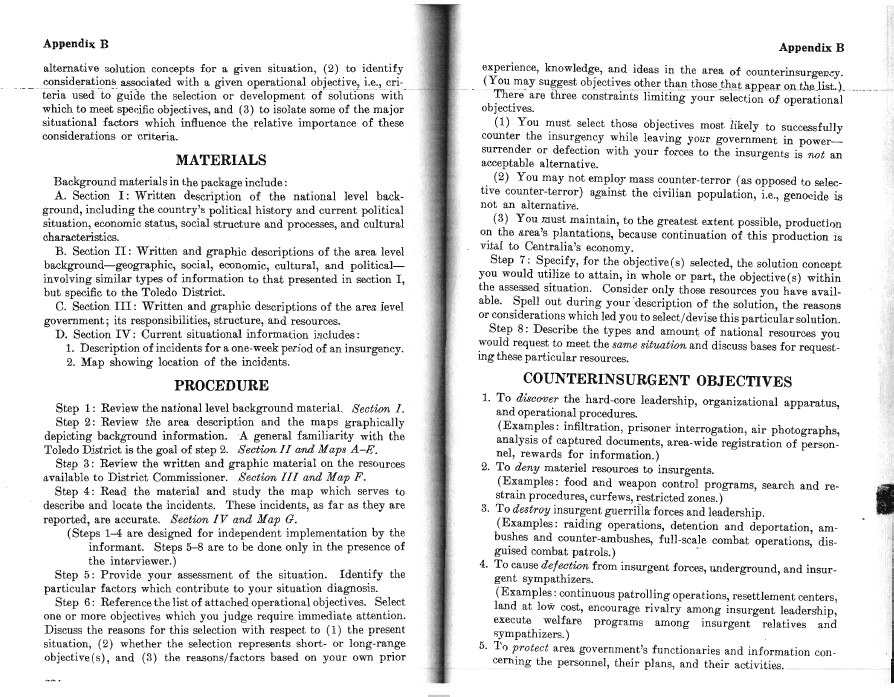
"1. You must select those objectives most likely to successfully counter the insurgency while leaving your government in power....: 2. You may not employ mass counter-terror (as opposed to selective counter—terror) against the civilian population, i.e., genocide is not an alternative.; 3. You must maintain, to the greatest extent possible, production on the area’s plantations, because continuation of this production is vital to Centralia’s economy."

The US Army Foreign Intelligence Assistance Program, was a 1960s program. One part was "Project X", a military effort to create intelligence field manuals drawn from counterinsurgency experience in Vietnam, specifically from the CIA's Phoenix program in South Vietnam, an assassination program designed to identify and "neutralize" the infrastructure of the Viet Cong. The manuals influenced the "KUBARK Counterintelligence Interrogation-July 1963", "Human Resource Exploitation Training Manual-1983" as well as intelligence manuals used at the School of the Americas.

== Project X ==
The Project X counterinsurgency manuals were "a guide for the conduct of clandestine operations" against insurgents and political adversaries calling for social reform. Some of the material used until 1991 included manuals on "Agent Handling" and "Counterintelligence," which "provided training regarding the use of Sodium Pentothal [truth serum] compound in interrogation, abduction of adversary family members to influence the adversary, prioritization of adversary personalities for abduction, exile, physical beatings and execution." The manual suggests the creation of inventories of families and their assets to keep tabs on the population. One of the lessons described "a general introduction to censorship to include reference to Armed Forces Censorship...and National Censorship." Students are warned of the dangers of the electoral process. Guerrillas, "can resort to subversion of the government by means of elections," it said. "Insurgent leaders participate in political contests as candidates for government office." Peaceful democratic activity is equated with terrorists. "It is important to note that many terrorists are very well trained in subversion of the democratic process and use the system to advance their causes," the manual said. "This manipulation ends with the destruction of the democratic system. Discontent that can become political violence can have as its cause political, social, and economic activities of terrorists operating within the democratic system," it adds. The manual describes the director of the Peace and Justice Resource Center, Tom Hayden, formerly a California state senator, as "one of the masters of terrorist planning." The CIA manual on "Handling of Sources," states that, "the CI [Counterintelligence] agent must consider all the organizations as possible guerrilla sympathizers." Counterintelligence agents are instructed on targets for "neutralizing", which was a euphemism for execution of, "political leaders, and members of the infrastructure." The targets to be "neutralized" are what the manual describes as "front groups" for the guerrillas, such as "paramilitary groups, labor unions, and dissident groups." Citizens were put on "'black, gray or white lists' for the purpose of identifying and prioritizing adversary targets."

=== Export ===
The doctrine contained in the Project X manuals was transmitted to the armed forces of 11 South and Central American countries, including El Salvador, Guatemala, Colombia, Honduras, Ecuador and Peru, among others. The manuals were distributed through the Army's Foreign Officer Course, Special Forces Mobile Training Teams (MTTs) and the U.S. Army School of the Americas (SOA), a training center for Latin American armed forces, based in Fort Benning Georgia. The school's curriculum placed great weight on ideological conditioning and "steeped young Latin American officers in the early-1950-era anti-Communist dogma that subversive infiltrators could be anywhere." In 1992, all Project X material was ordered destroyed by the Department of Defense (DOD).

== See also ==
- U.S. Army and CIA interrogation manuals
