= Robert Richter (American film producer) =

American filmmaker (1929–2025)

- Born: October 23, 1929; New York City, U.S.
- Died: February 16, 2025 (aged 95); New York City, U.S.
- Education: Occidental College; Reed College; Iowa Writers' Workshop; Columbia University
- Occupations: Documentary filmmaker, producer, screenwriter
- Years active: 1958–2022
- Spouse: Libby Bassett
- Children: 4

Robert Richter (October 23, 1929 – February 16, 2025) was an American documentary filmmaker. He was nominated for two Academy Awards for Best Documentary Short.

== Early life and education ==
Richter was born in New York. After graduating from Brooklyn Technical High School, young Robert headed west to California’s Occidental College for a Telluride Association experimental program, then to Reed College, and the Iowa Writers' Workshop.

== Career ==
After the Iowa Writers Workshop, Richter joined Oregon Public Broadcasting initially as a producer-reporter, then Director of Public Affairs programs. In addition he reported from the Pacific Northwest for The New York Times. A CBS News Fellowship brought him back to New York where he earned an M.A. in Public Law and Government at Columbia University in 1964. He was the last member of the Edward R. Murrow-Fred Friendly CBS Reports unit still documentaries.

After he left CBS in 1968 to become an independent filmmaker, his company, Richter Productions, Inc. made more than 50 documentaries telecast in prime time on HBO, PBS, CBS, NBC, ABC, TBS, Discovery, BBC and major overseas television outlets.

Richter published a memoir, Documentaries and Serendipity, in 2022.

== Personal life and death ==
Richter was married to the former Libby Bassett, and had four children. He died from heart failure at his New York City home on February 16, 2025, at the age of 95.

== Awards ==
Richter received numerous accolades. Three of his films were nominated for the Academy Award for Best Documentary Short Film; (TV's Pulitzer Prize); the Distinguished Science Reporting Award from AAAS (American Academy for Advancement of Science); Peabody Awards; many US and international film festival awards; critical acclaim in The New York Times and other major papers. Richter's many documentaries on environmental subjects earned him a Global 500 Award from the United Nations Environment Programme—the only independent producer in the world to receive this honor.

== Selected filmography ==
- HHH: What Manner of Man (1968)
- The Gifts (1970)
- Linus Pauling, Crusading Scientist (1977)
- Vietnam: An American Journey (1979)
- For Export Only: Pesticides (1980)
- For Export Only: Pharmaceuticals (1980)
- A Plague on our Children (1980)
- What Price Clean Air? (1982)
- Gods of Metal (1982)
- In Our Hands (1984)
- Hungry for Profit (1985)
- The Age of Intelligent Machines (1986)
- Who Shot President Kennedy? (1988)
- Can Tropical Rainforests Be Saved? (1991)
- The Money Lenders (1991)
- School of the Americas Assassins (1994)
- Ben Spock, Baby Doctor (1996)
- Father Roy: Inside the School of Assassins (1997)
- The Last Atomic Bomb (2006)
- The Ultimate Wish: Ending the Nuclear Age (2013)
- Leaving Home (2015)
