= Pacem in Terris Peace and Freedom Award =

The Pacem in Terris Peace and Freedom Award is a Catholic peace award which has been given annually since 1964, in commemoration of the 1963 encyclical letter Pacem in terris (Peace on Earth) of Pope John XXIII. It is awarded "to honor a person for their achievements in peace and justice, not only in their country but in the world", and has been granted to people of many different creeds.

The award was begun in 1963 by the Davenport Catholic Interracial Council of the Diocese of Davenport in the U.S. state of Iowa. Since 1976, the award has been presented each year by the Quad Cities (Davenport and Bettendorf in southeastern Iowa, Rock Island, Moline, and East Moline in northwestern Illinois) Pacem in Terris Coalition. In 2010, sponsors of the award were the Diocese of Davenport, St. Ambrose University, Augustana College, Churches United of the Quad-Cities, Pax Christi, The Catholic Messenger, the Congregation of the Humility of Mary, the Sisters of St. Benedict, the Muslim Community of the Quad Cities, and the Sisters of St. Francis.

Six recipients have also received a Nobel Peace Prize. Two recipients are Servants of God, meaning that they are being reviewed by the Catholic Church for possible canonization as a saint, while a third, Mother Teresa, has been canonized as Saint Teresa of Calcutta.

== Award winners ==
Year	Image	Recipient	Nationality or Base Country	Citation
1964		John Howard Griffin (1920–1980)	United States	for his "powerful book, Black Like Me, which has showed us how we are too often judged not by the content of our character but by the color of our skin."
1964		John F. Kennedy (b. 1917–1963)	United States	for having "awakened in us a hope that no problem was too great to conquer — race relations, violence or poverty — when citizens work together" (posthumously awarded)
1965		Martin Luther King Jr. (1929–1968)	United States	for having "challenged us to dream of a world transformed through nonviolent civil rights activism."
1966		Sargent Shriver (1915–2011)	United States	for having "taught us that one person can indeed make a difference."
1967		A. Philip Randolph (1889–1979)	United States	for his "efforts to organize railway employees convinced us that the dignity of work must be rewarded with a just wage."
1968		James Groppi (1930–1985)	United States	for "waking people to the injustice of unfair housing and racial prejudice in Milwaukee."
1969		Saul Alinsky (1909–1972)	United States	for having "taught people how to organize and to act together in promoting justice in society."
1970	Not awarded			
1971	Not awarded			
1972		Dorothy Day (1897–1980)	United States	for having "founded the Catholic Worker Movement and reminded us to look for Christ in the faces of the poor."
1973	Not awarded			
1974		Harold Hughes (1922–1996)	United States	for having "brought the message of the Gospel to the cause of equal education, civil rights and opposition to capital punishment."
1975		Hélder Câmara (1909–1999)	Brazil	as "gentle shepherd of the poor of northwestern Brazil, who embraced the impoverished and gave sharp prophecy to the wealthy."
1976		Mother Teresa, M.C. (1910–1997)	Albania; India	who "gave hope to the desperate and offered light to those living in abject poverty."
1977	Not awarded			
1978	Not awarded			
1979		Thomas Gumbleton (b. 1930)	United States	for having "challenged church leadership to embrace nonviolence instead of the just war theory."
1980		Crystal Lee Sutton (1940–2009)	United States	for having "organized labor in the South and reminded us that equal work demands equal pay."
1980		Ernest Leo Unterkoefler (1917–1993)	United States	for having "advocated for the rights of workers and helped to buoy the labor movement among the poor in Appalachia."
1981	Not awarded			
1982		George F. Kennan (1904–2004)	United States	for having "realized that the only hope for solving the world's problems lies in abandoning violence."
1983		Helen Caldicott (b. 1938)	United States	for having " spoken on behalf of the world's children in the face of possible nuclear holocaust."
1984	Not awarded			
1985		Joseph Bernardin (1928–1996)	United States	"through his notion of the consistent ethic of life and the seamless garment taught us that all life is God-given and therefore precious."
1986		Maurice John Dingman (1914–1992)	United States	"through his love for the land worked for peace and justice and reminded all of us of our roots in the soil."
1987		Desmond Tutu (1931–2021)	South Africa	for having "helped free South Africa from the yoke of apartheid, teaching the entire world that racial injustice is sacrilege."
1988	Not awarded			
1989		Eileen Egan (1912–2000)	United States	"through her work with Pax Christi and Catholic Relief Services addressed the world's problems through missionary zeal and creative nonviolence."
1990		Mairead Maguire (b. 1944)	United Kingdom; Ireland	for having "become a global force against violence in the name of religion."
1991		María Julia Hernández (1939–2007)	El Salvador	for having "directed the Human Rights Committee and spoke for the victims of the long civil war in El Salvador."
1992		Cesar Chavez (1927–1993)	United States	for having "become a passionate voice for workers who have long been disenfranchised."
1993		Daniel Berrigan, S.J. (1921–2016)	United States	for having "offered powerful witness on behalf of peace and justice."
1994	Not awarded			
1995		Jim Wallis (b. 1948)	United States	for having " brought people of faith to espouse radical social engagement."
1996		Samuel Ruiz (1924–2011)	Mexico	for having "lent great courage to his fight against violence and injustice inflicted against the poor and oppressed of Chiapas, Mexico."
1997		James W. Douglass (b. 1937)	United States	for having "been steadfast in their efforts to build a world of peace based on justice."
1997		Shelley Douglass (b. 1940)	United States	for having "been steadfast in their efforts to build a world of peace based on justice."
1998		Helen Prejean, C.S.J. (b. 1939)	United States	"through her loving presence on death row has fostered reconciliation and spiritual healing."
1999		Adolfo Pérez Esquivel (b. 1931)	Argentina	for having "inspired the world with his Gospel-rooted work on behalf of Argentina's 'disappeared ones.'"
2000		George G. Higgins (1916–2002)	United States	for having "wove together communities of faith and organized labor to support economic justice."
2001		Lech Wałęsa (b. 1943)	Poland	for having "become a global leader for freedom and democracy."
2002		Gwen Hennessey, O.S.F. (b. 1932)	United States	for having "devoted their lives and ministry to local activism on global issues of peace and justice."
2002		Dorothy Hennessey, O.S.F. (1913–2008)	United States	for having "devoted their lives and ministry to local activism on global issues of peace and justice."
2003	Not awarded			
2004		Arthur Simon (b. 1930)	United States	for having "shown how one person can make a difference alleviating world hunger."
2005		Donald Mosley (b. 1939)	United States	for having "served others by offering hospitality to refugees, housing for the homeless and mediation to situations of war."
2006	Not awarded			
2007		Salim Ghazal (1931–2011)	Lebanon	for having "worked with Muslims and Christians to promote reconciliation, peace and hope for young people and others displaced by Lebanon's civil war."
2008		Marvin Mottet (1930–2016)	United States	for having "devoted his life to walking the two feet of social action: direct service and social justice."
2009		Hildegard Goss-Mayr (b. 1930)	Austria	"one of the world's leading experts on nonviolence, a teacher, visionary and pioneer who helped forge a new path toward peace on earth for all humanity."
2010		John Dear (b. 1959)	United States	for having "delivered the message of the nonviolent Jesus in word and deed in confronting nuclear arms manufacturing and use."
2011		Álvaro Leonel Ramazzini Imeri (b. 1947)	Guatemala	"for his continuing efforts on behalf of Guatemala's most vulnerable communities, the indigenous people of Guatemala."
2012		Kim Bobo (b. 1954)	United States	for having "educated a nation about the prevalence of wage theft and injustice that disproportionately affects the poor amongst us."
2013		Jean Vanier (1928–2019)	Canada	for having "founded L’Arche, an international, faith-based federation of communities where people with and without intellectual disabilities share life together."
2014		Simone Campbell, S.S.S. (b. 1945)	United States	for having "organized the "Nuns on the Bus" Campaign in 2012 that riveted the nation's attention. She is the driving force for programs and policies that support faith, families and fairness."
2015		Thích Nhất Hạnh (1926–2022)	Vietnam	"honored for his lifelong commitment to peace and for his inspired, dedicated work to bridge Eastern and Western spiritual traditions."
2016		Gustavo Gutiérrez, O.P. (b. 1928)	Peru	"recognized as a prominent figure in Latin American Catholicism with his book A Theology on Liberation led many to view him as the founder of liberation theology."
2017		Widad Akrawi (b. 1969)	Iraq	for having "cofounded the human rights organization, Defend International."
2018	Not awarded			
2019		Tenzin Gyatso, 14th Dalai Lama (b. 1935)	Tibet	for having "worked tirelessly for peace and justice and advocates for human dignity for all in Asia."
2019		Munib Younan (b. 1950)	Palestine	for having "committed to cultivating peace by building bridges among religions."
2020	Not awarded due to COVID-19 pandemic			
2021	Not awarded due to COVID-19 pandemic			
2022		Norma Pimentel, M.J. (b. 1953)	United States	"for her dedication to serving asylum seekers as executive director of Catholic Charities of the Rio Grande Valley in the Brownsville Diocese in Texas."
2023		Atiya Aftab and Sheryl Olitzky	United States	for being "co-founders of the Sisterhood of Salaam Shalom."
2024		Chad Pregracke(b. 1975)	United States	for being the "founder and president of Living Lands & Waters, an environmental organization, he was the first recipient recognized for work on environmental justice and care for creation."
2025		Silvio José Báez Ortega, OCD (b. 1958)	Nicaragua	for his "commitment as a shepherd of the poor and a courageous defender of human rights and democracy who had endured physical injury and threats to [his] life while pursuing mediation between government and pro-democracy forces in your beloved Nicaragua"

== See also ==
- List of ecclesiastical decorations
