= Foreign relations of Ethiopia =

The foreign relations of Ethiopia refers to overall diplomatic relationship of Ethiopia. The Ministry of Foreign Affairs oversees foreign relations and diplomatic missions of the country.

Ethiopia is one of few early African countries admitted to the League of Nations, becoming a member on 28 September 1923, and was one of the founding members of the United Nations. During the Scramble for Africa, Ethiopia had maintained its full sovereignty over European colonial power and fought the First Italo-Ethiopian War in 1895–96. However, the League did not protect in accord with the envisaged "collective security" of the country, resulted Italy's occupation of Ethiopia for 5 years (1936–1941).

From 1950s, Ethiopia participated to UN peacekeeping missions such as in Korean War and Congo Crisis. Virtually, Ethiopia maintains diplomatic relations to most countries, and is non-permanent member of the UN Security Council.

== History ==
=== Antiquity ===
==== Land of Punt ====
Punt (2500 BCE – 980 BCE) was predominantly a trading centre dominated by Ancient Egypt to Horn of Africa. Trading commodities includes exports of Egypt; one of the most essential was incense, which was mainly used for religious rituals for embalming corpse. Other were ivory, spices, hides and exotic animals that convey route to coast of Ethiopia, thus Ethiopia has been an integral part of Punt. Egyptian expedition to southeastern African region was generally commenced in the second millennium BC, after stabilizing relations with kingdoms of today's Sudan, the Kush, Napata and Meroë.

==== South Arabia ====
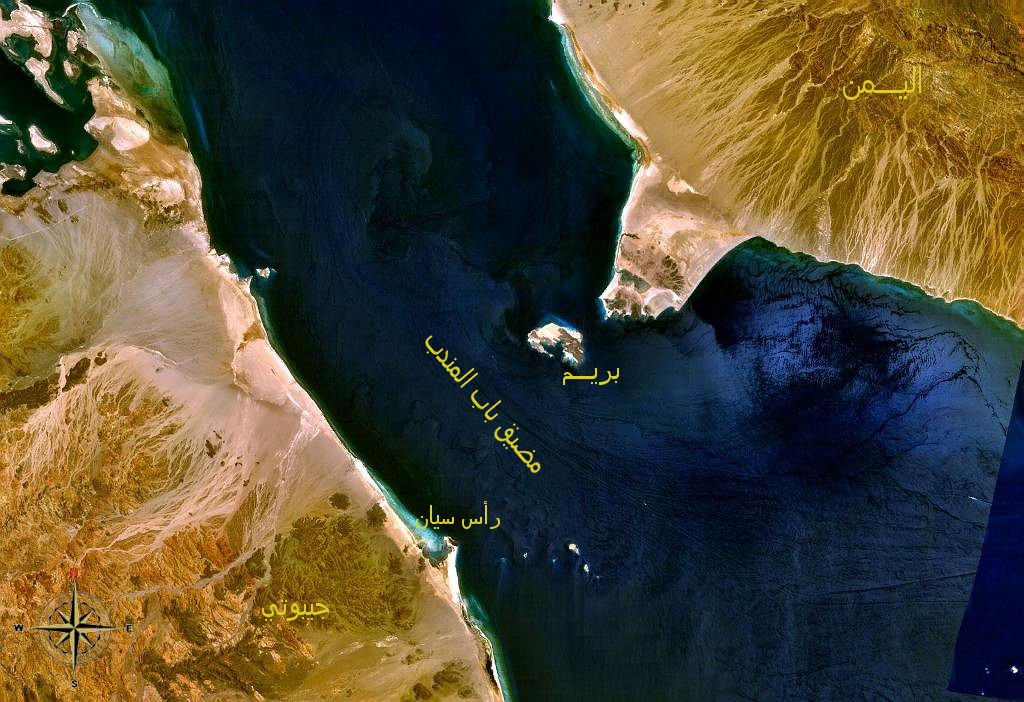
NASA capture of Arabic description of strait Bab el Mandeb. It is known for passage for South Arabian migration.

Some theorists hypothesized Ancient South Arabian people migrated out of Africa to the strait Bab-el-Mandeb when its sea level decreased to current status. When their civilization came to appear from 4th millennium BC, onward Mesopotamia and the Persian Gulf, adaptation of Semitic language was from end of Mediterranean, though they used Canaanite alphabet developed from Syria or Palestine during second millennium BC. Apparently, these languages similarity compared to Hebrew and Phoenician alphabets, even though lacked scholarly consensus. By 500 BC, it was widely spoken such as the Ge'ez language.

Writing system through inscription on stone often detailed historical rival kingdoms in the region, most notability the Saba, Qataban, Himyar, Hadhramaut, Ma'in and others. In 1959, American archeologists collected numerous artifacts and body of inscriptions in the area, belonging to primary sources. The inscription not only detailed about South Arabia, but also the early Ethiopian history associated with Kingdom of Aksum and its rulers.

==== Kingdom of Aksum ====
Map of Eastern Hemisphere in the first century featuring trade route of Aksum with the rest powerful states

The Kingdom of Aksum has been a great power in classic Africa; once it has been referenced by Persian prophet Mani in the 3rd century and Greco-Roman trading guide Periplus of the Erythraean Sea in first century. Axum maintained well-defined foreign relations with powerful realms in the era. According to Stuart Munro-Hay witness, the Aksumite had several account of ambassadors that had delegation with neighboring powers. Occasionally, Aksumite contact with foreign powers also attested by archaeological or scarce finds.

==== Egypt ====
Aksumite relations with pre-Roman Egypt was ostensibly uncertain. However, it was considered that Aksumite contact were also existed during the fall of Ptolemaic dynasty with Cleopatra death in 30 BC. Few artifacts were uncovered from Egypt such as cippus of Horus given to Bruce, and illustrated by him, and a few amulet figurines of blue faience or cornaline found at various sites of Ethiopia. Other include the double-uraeus, perhaps brought from Meroë.

Another discoveries are an inscription of Ptolemy III copied by Kosmas at Adulis and ankh'-sign engraved on one of the stelae. During King Ezana's reign, he expedited to the Nile after Meroë was entirely sacked. After its successor Noba emerged, it behaved badly to consign Aksumite ambassadors punished with military expedition. An aggressive mistreatment was objected by tribes such as the Mangurto, the Barya, and the Khasa by asking support, either regarded Aksum would an aide of Noba or possibly a suzerain. Ezana's expedition also attacked Kasu, the remnants of Meroitic state. Nuba, Kasu, and Beja were integral to Ezana's kingdom. Meroitic artifacts have been found in Ethiopian location Addi Galamo (Atse Dera) such as bronze bowls, which was brought from Roman Egypt. It was possibly made up of diorite thumb-ring found by the BIEA expedition at Aksum, and corna line amulet of Harpocrates with typical double-uraeus of the Meroites.

==== South Arabia ====
Saba, Himyar and Hadhramawit kingdom commonly known as South Arabian states—had special relations with Ethiopia. Culturally, linguistically, and socially, Aksumite civilization completely inspired by those overseas. While Aksumite intervention to states generally uncertain, it was viable to have a military expedition beginning in 3rd century. During the period of GDRT and Adhebah reign, (’DBH), Aksumite commenced a military treaty with Saba and then with Hadhramawit in the first half of third century.

During Adhebah period, Shamir called Himyar prince Dhu-Raydan sent military aid from Aksum. Later, Aksumite king adopted nominally "king of Saba and Himyar", asserting suzerainty. Foreign contact also continued during the fifth and early sixth centuries between the two sides of Red Sea. Byzantine scholar Procopius told the voyage of crossing Red Sea for five days and nights and that "the harbor of the Homeritae from which they are accustomed to putting to sea is called Boulikas", presumably somewhere near Mukha, and " at the end of the sail across the sea they always put in at the harbor of the Adulitae" at the reign of King Kaleb.

Arabian titles were experienced in South Arabia during Kaleb's reign; after his viceroy deposed by Jewish Himyar king Yusuf Asar, Yemen was no longer requisite to Aksum. The event led Aksumite to decline its dominion. An inscription dated to 543 AD mentioned that the new king named Abraha dealing with the restoration of great dam at Marib, and mentioned embassies from various foreign countries such as Aksum, Rome, Persia and various Arab groups. Procopius noted that Abreha was subordinated by Kaleb, a period which unbeknownst to Abreha regaining the kingdom reputations and he received little damage.

=== Middle Ages ===
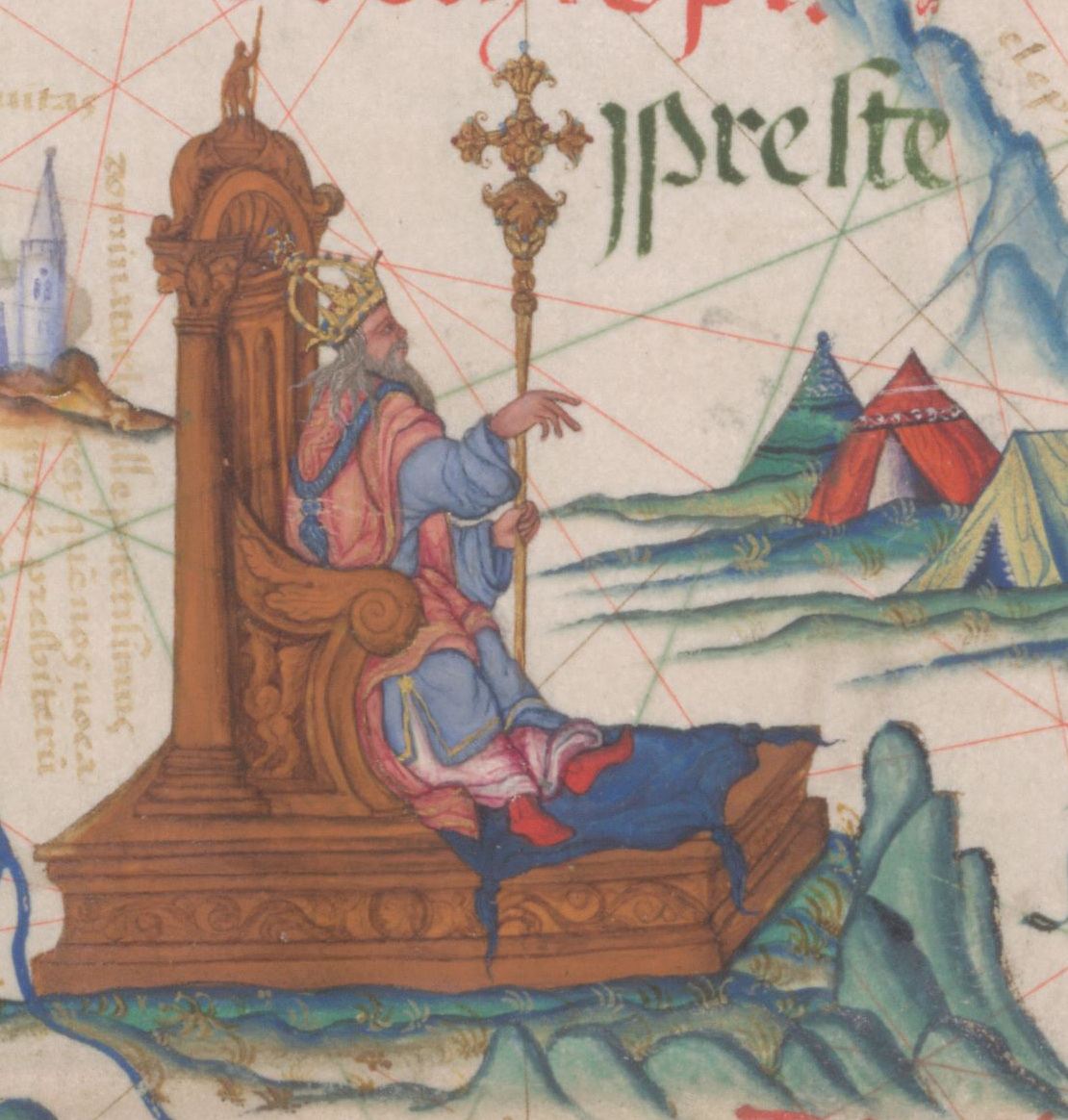
"Preste" as the Emperor of Ethiopia, enthroned on a map of East Africa. From an atlas by the Portuguese cartographer Diogo Homem for Queen Mary, c. 1555–1559. (British Library)

Foreign relations in the Middle Ages have impacted by an interaction with Iberian countries—Spain and Portugal—especially the latter had considerable power on internal affairs. Portuguese influence spanned from 1500 to 1672, they had an interest of spreading Jesuit order from 1556 to 1632. According to their narrative effluence, the Portuguese authors underscored their involvement to Ethiopia, but overturned to smoothly decay. Portuguese authors works notably Francisco Álvares, Miguel de Castanhoso, and Pedro Páez survived to this day. Prester John, a fabulous Christian king, spurred the Portuguese to pursue Ethiopia whose kingdom they equated with Garden of Eden. According to the legend, he was born about 1460 and last seen in 1526. There is also speculation about his age where he lived for fifteen or twenty seven years beyond 1526.

Pero da Covilhã profoundly marched overland into the Ethiopian Highlands about the end of 1492 or beginning of 1493, characterized by conquest and superiority. He sent an information to Lisbon a few years later that contributed Vasco da Gama mobilisation to African southern cap into the Indian Ocean. The Portuguese navy almost dominated the coastline of Eastern Hemisphere.

In the early 15th century, Ethiopia sought to make diplomatic contact with European kingdoms for the first time since the Aksumite era. Atse Dawit I first made contact with the Republic of Venice by requesting for religious artifacts and craftsmen. A letter from Henry IV of England to the Ethiopian Emperor survives. In 1428, Yeshaq I sent two emissaries to Alfonso V of Aragon, who sent his own emissaries that failed to complete the return trip home to Aragon.

The first continuous relations with a European country began in 1508 with Portugal under Dawit II (Lebna Dengel), who had just inherited the throne from his father. In 1487, King John II of Portugal sent two emissaries to the Orient, Pero da Covilhã and Afonso de Paiva; Afonso would die on this mission. By the end of Middle Ages, the Ethiopian Empire was in a 13 year long war with neighboring Muslim states, and a Portuguese expedition force was sent from Goa, India to aid the Ethiopian Army due to an ongoing rivalry with the Ottoman Empire, who provided logistical support to the Adal Sultanate.

=== Early modern period ===
==== Gondarine period ====
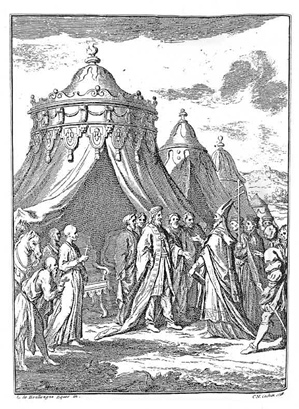
Emperor Susenyos I receives Latin Patriarch Afonso Mendes. Painted in 1713

Since 16th century, Roman Catholicism and the Jesuits increasingly influenced on state power. Besides, the Oromo migrations had vital role in the northern Ethiopia. Among other Jesuit, Spanish Jesuit Pedro Paez had favorable relations to the Emperors of Ethiopia like Za Dengel and Susenyos I, the latter promulgated that Roman Catholicism state administrative to the Empire in 1622 on behalf of Orthodox Tewahedo Church, resulted in grave conflict for the years.

The reign of Emperor Fasilides in 1632 arranged this status by restoring Orthodox Tewahedo state leadership and expelled Jesuits from his land. After founding Gondar in 1636, Ethiopia then prospered again with the beginning of "Gondarine period" characterized as relatively peaceful governance. However, few Franciscan and Capuchin friars said to be lived during the 18th century such as Franciscan Giuseppe Maria di Gerusalemme, Remedius Prutky (who left credible records to the city).

Architecture of this period was slightly influenced by the remnant Jesuits, but also the presence of Arab, Indians (brought by the Jesuits) as well as Turkish in Ottoman occupied northern area had involvement. One of the example is castles in Fasil Ghebbi.

==== Post-Zemene Mesafint ====
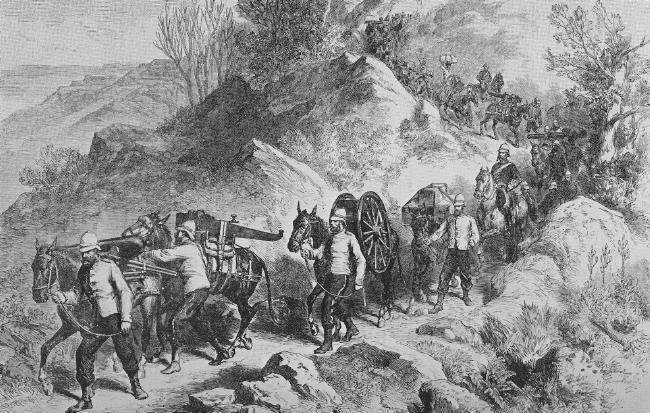
The British expeditionary force moving artillery across the Ethiopian Highlands

Emperor Tewodros II reinstated the imperial power and foreign relations. His connection of Queen Victoria and other European leaders unfavorable when he sent unresponsive letter to the Queen, eventually leading to brief war with the British Empire. The British sent 13,000 soldiers, 26,000 men for logistical support and 40,000 animals including war elephants from India during their expedition, resulting in Tewodros suicide at Magdala in 1868. Not only modernized the empire, but he also paved the way of coherence the succession for subsequent emperors. Ethiopia was briefly isolated from world power in the post-Zemene Mesafint period; Emperor Yohannes IV faced Egyptian invasion as they laid linkage of Suez Canal to Massawa, and opening road between Addi Quala and Gundet used to penetrate the Ethiopian Empire. Yohannes IV on other side was reluctant to improve the road from the Ethiopian Highland to the coast of Red Sea. According to British assistant John Kirkham, he "preferred to keep his money hoarded up". Likewise, German traveller Gerhard Rohlfs asserted that he wanted to build churches rather than roads. Road working, on the sides, was completed by Swedish missionaries at Monkulu. British traveller Augustus B. Wylde supposed that Abyssinians were "in fear of foreign invasion" where lastly commented "I suppose they are right".

Wylde noted that the first Ethiopian diaspora took place in mid-1880s, who had been from Massawa to Europe, adapting European trousers. This was strictly outlawed by the Emperor. The empire nonetheless, was surged into modernization by foreign contribution, numerous missionary schools were expanded by Swedish Protestants at Monkulu and the French Lazarist at Keren, the later described by Wylde "a very useful education" with "very well conducted". Ethiopia had received broad European population in the 19th-century: Jean Baraglion of French origin who had lived for over a decade and according to Wylde, he enjoyed monopoly at Adwa. Despite rejoice, Baraglion encountered at least two rivals, a Hungarian named André who made an artificial limbs, and a Greek who have lived to Shewa over several years.

=== Menelik II ===
Ethiopia had strong diplomatic relations under Emperor Menelik II with Britain, France and Italy, the latter pursued hegemony to Ethiopian Empire after establishing colony in Eritrea (1882). The British and French rival with Italy due to insecurity with their respective protectorate in East Africa. However, both feared the process of Menelik's Expansions. In 1891, the British policy makers sent a circular note to the other world powers concerning the large portion of Nile Valley belonged to Ethiopia, "the activities and the pretension of the Negus were practically enough in themselves to bring the British to the support of Italian policy in East Africa."

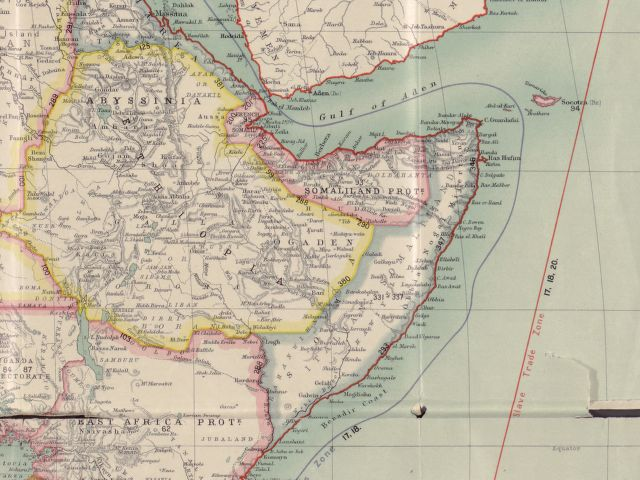
Ethiopia in 1909 illustrated by Edward Hertslet

On 2 May 1889, the Treaty of Wuchale was signed between Ethiopia and Italy with respective bilingual version. The treaty was signed after the Italian occupation of Eritrea and aimed to create friendship with both countries. The Amharic and Italian language, however confused by Article 17 in which Menelik denounced in 1893, resulting Italy's threatening over the status of newly formed boundary.

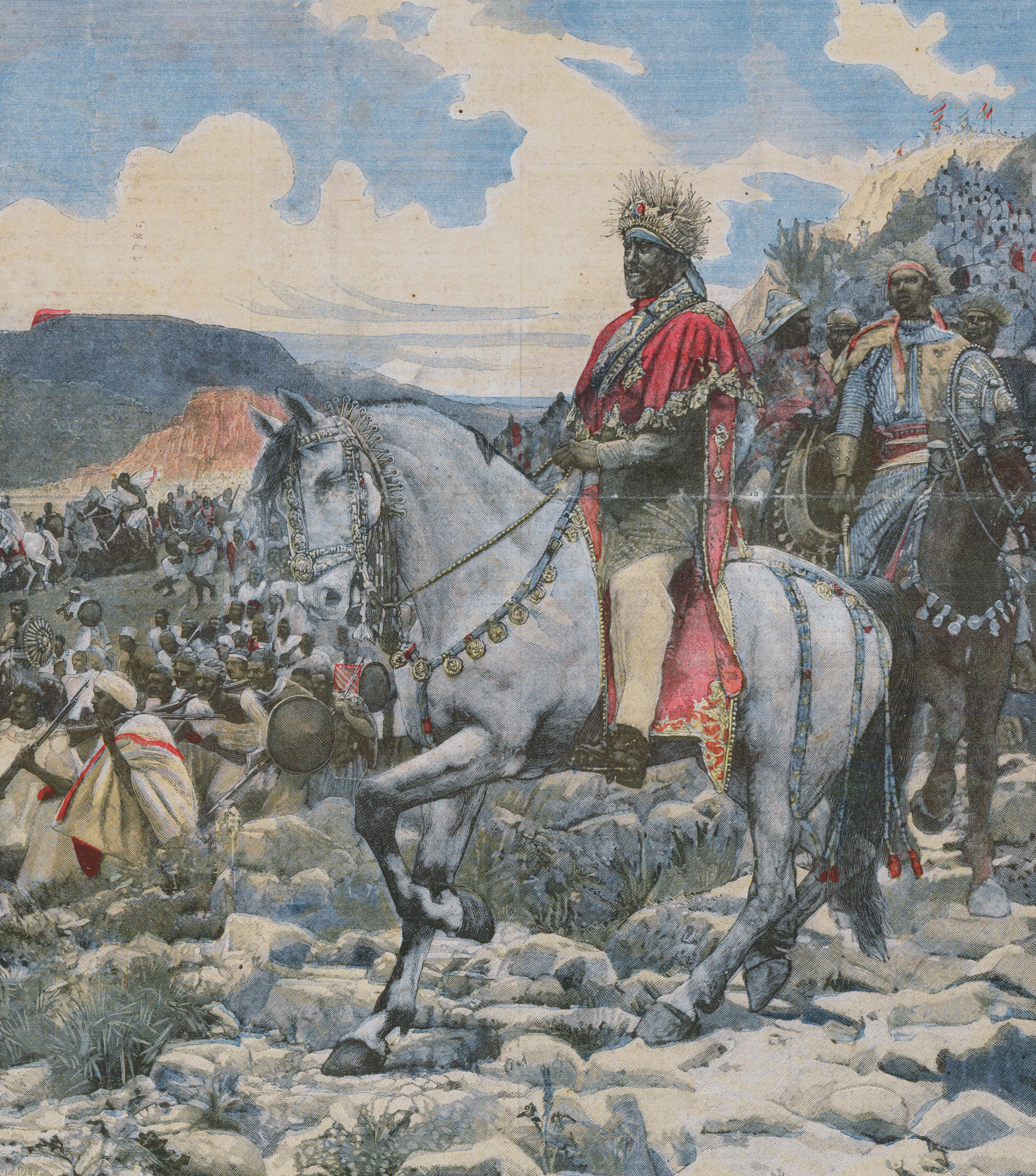
Menelik II at the Battle of Adwa

In 1895, the First Italo-Ethiopian War began, ending with Italy's defeat at Battle of Adwa by Ethiopian troops who were assisted logistically by Menelik. By early 1900, European agencies opened legation in Addis Ababa and had huge impact on investment in the country's infrastructure (schools, banks, road, railway etc.).

=== Haile Selassie ===
During Haile Selassie coronation in 1930, emissaries from the United States, Egypt, Turkey, Sweden, Belgium, and Japan were also presented. Since then, he led the forefront diplomatic relations of Ethiopia with world powers.

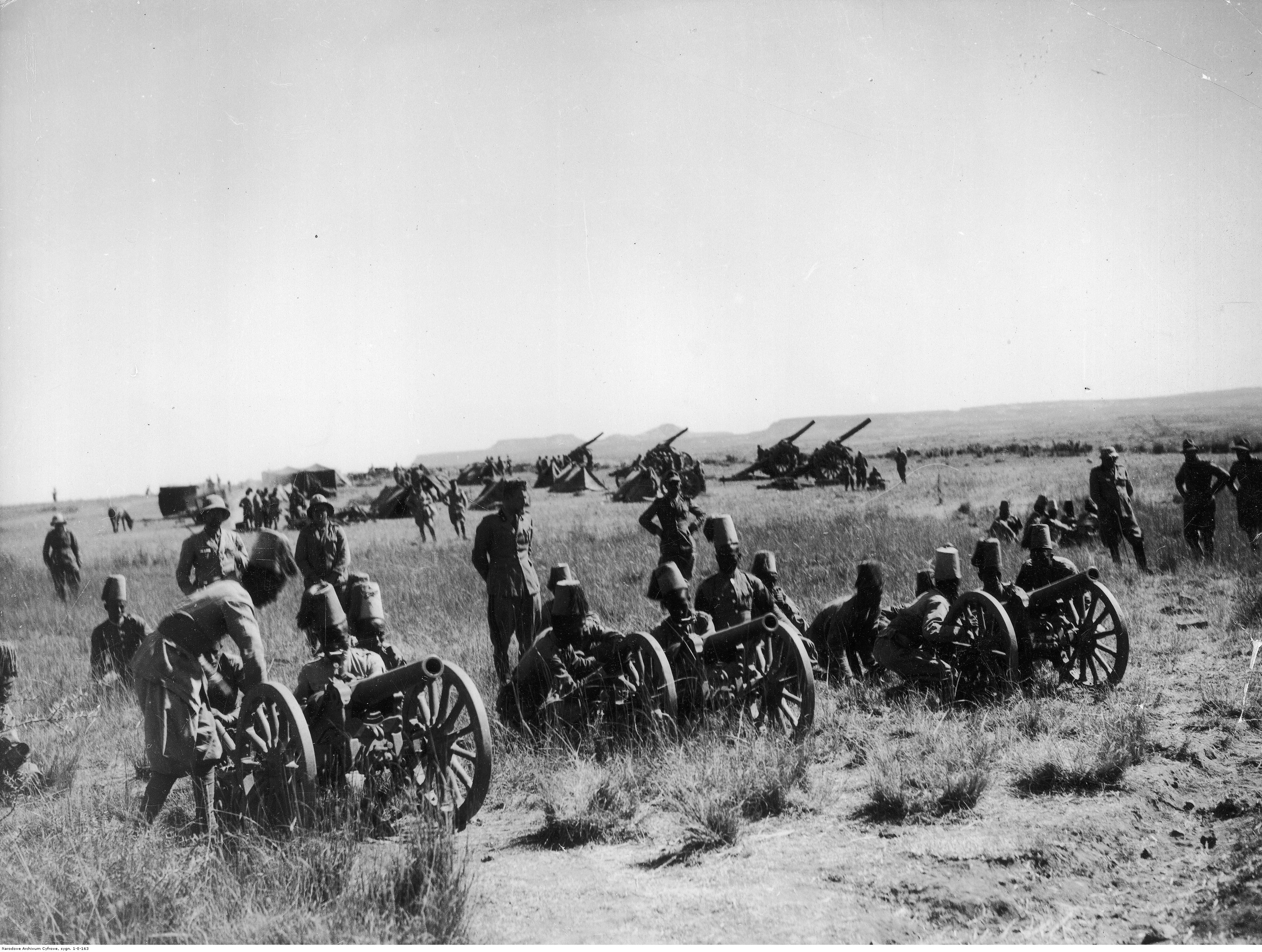
Italian artillery during the Second Italo-Ethiopian War, March 1936

In 1930s, Ethiopia faced Italian renewed imperialist design. Together with the failure of the League of Nations envision of Ethiopia's "collective security", Italy invaded Ethiopia again in October 1935, culminating in the Second Italo-Ethiopian War. In May 1936, Mussolini declared Ethiopia as part of Italian East Africa by merging with Eritrea and Somaliland. Haile Selassie fled to England's Fairfield House, Bath, and delivered an address that made him a worldwide figure, and the 1935 Time Man of the Year.

On 10 June 1940, Mussolini declared war on France and Britain and attacked British and Commonwealth forces in Egypt, Sudan, Kenya and British Somaliland. In January 1941, the British army together with Arbegnoch ("the Patriots") and Gideon Force occupied Ethiopia. On 5 May, Haile Selassie with auspice of Ethiopian Free Forces entered Addis Ababa and reclaimed his throne while the war continued until November. After their defeat, the Italian began guerrilla offensive in Ethiopia that lasted until the Armistice between Italy and Allied armed forces in September 1943.

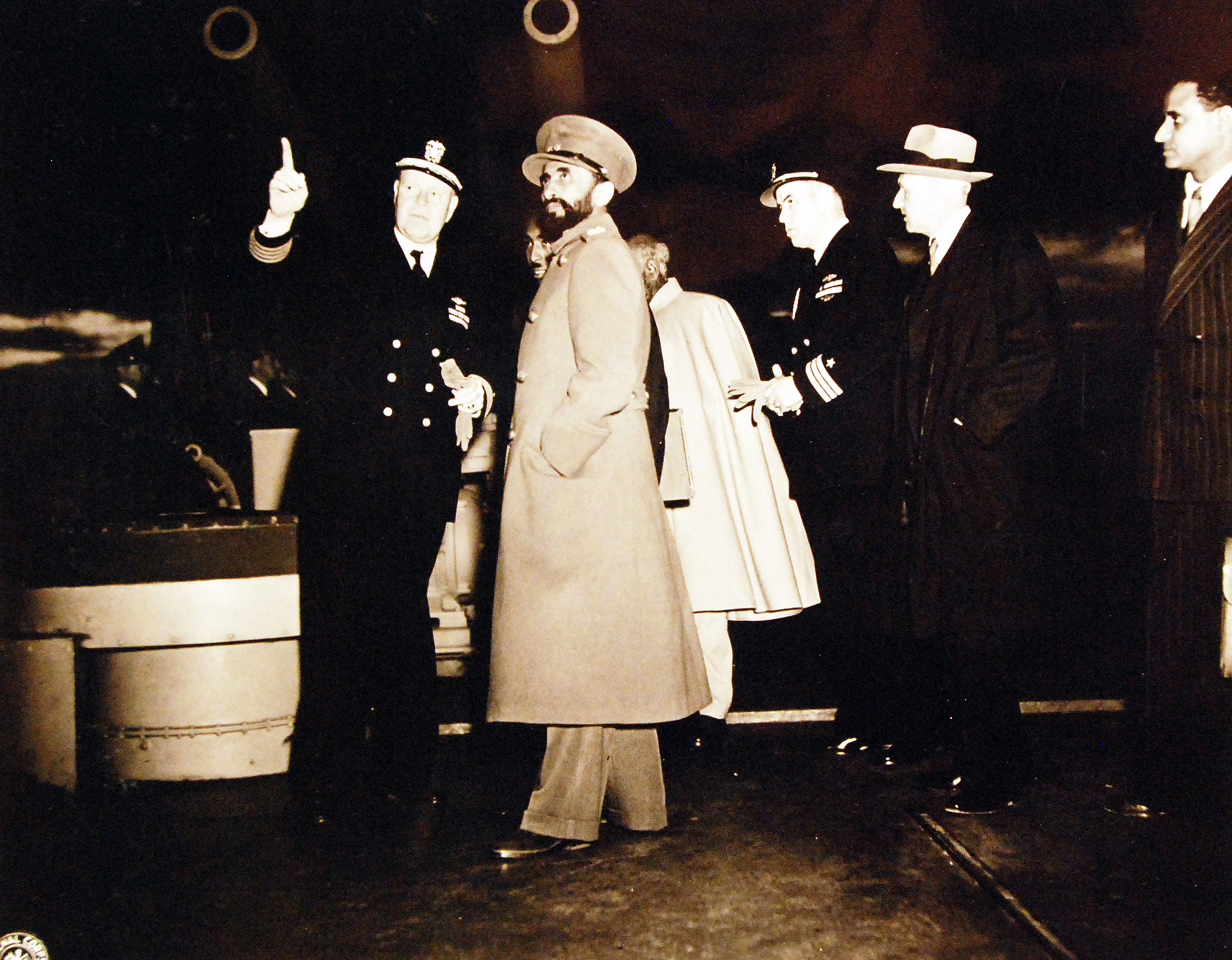
Captain Elliot M. Senn, USN, escorts Emperor Haile Selassie aboard the U.S. (13 February 1945)

On 31 January 1942, the British and Ethiopia signed Anglo-Ethiopian Agreement which Britain recognized Ethiopian sovereignty, except military occupation of Ogaden with their colony in Somaliland and the former Italian colony of Somaliland, creating a single polity. Ethiopians discontent about the privilege of military administration of some south-eastern region until formal agreement signed on 19 December 1944 that ended British advantage in the Ethiopian regions. The Italian Republic signed peace treaty on 10 February 1947 that recognized Ethiopia's sovereignty with agreement to pay $25,000,000 in reparations.

In 1952, Eritrea federated with Ethiopia with majority vote in the United Nations and this attitude declined by 1961, culminating in the Eritrean War of Independence since armed forces formed such as the Eritrean Liberation Front (ELF).

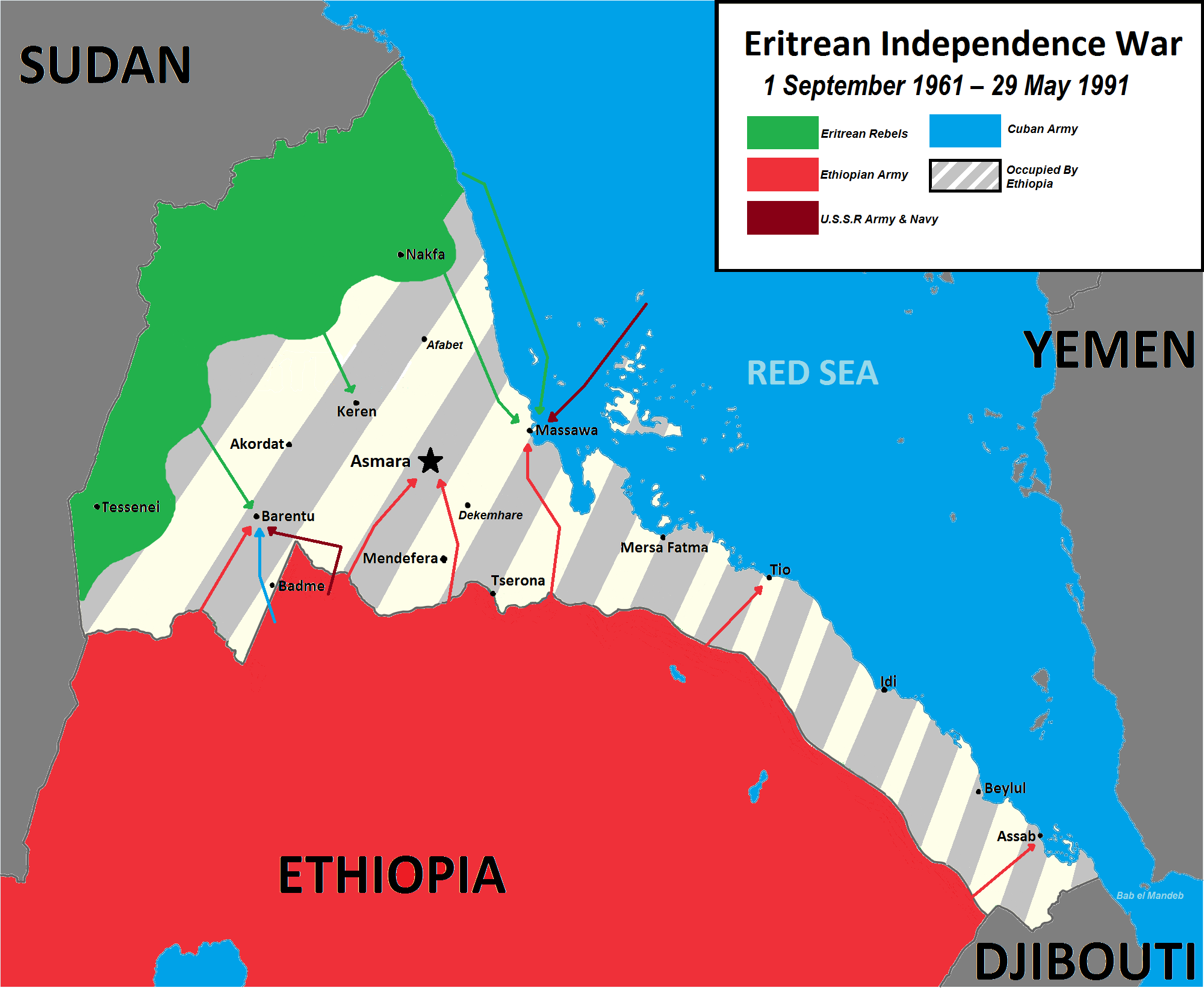
Eritrean War of Independence map in 1970s

Oppositions against Haile Selassie came to existence with students began marching through 1960s and early 1970s, chanting "land for tiller" and embracing several Marxist–Leninist theme. Haile Selassie deposed on 12 September 1974 by officers of Ethiopian Army led by Aman Andom named Coordinating Committee of the Armed Forces, Police and Territorial Army. The committee renamed itself Provisional Military Administrative Council known as the Derg after abolishing the Ethiopian Empire in March 1975.

=== The Derg era ===
The Derg aligned itself with Soviet bloc—had similar Marxist Leninist policy on Ethiopia. The Derg suffered from internal insurgency and ambivalent relations with neighboring countries such as Eritrea and Somalia. In 1977, the Ogaden War was fought between the Derg supported by Cuba, Soviet Union and South Yemen, and Somalia with the United States and Egypt. Although ending on 15 March 1978, the relations between Ethiopia and Somalia marred with political dispute with involvement of the Ogaden National Liberation Front (ONLF) in relations of the disputed Ogaden region.

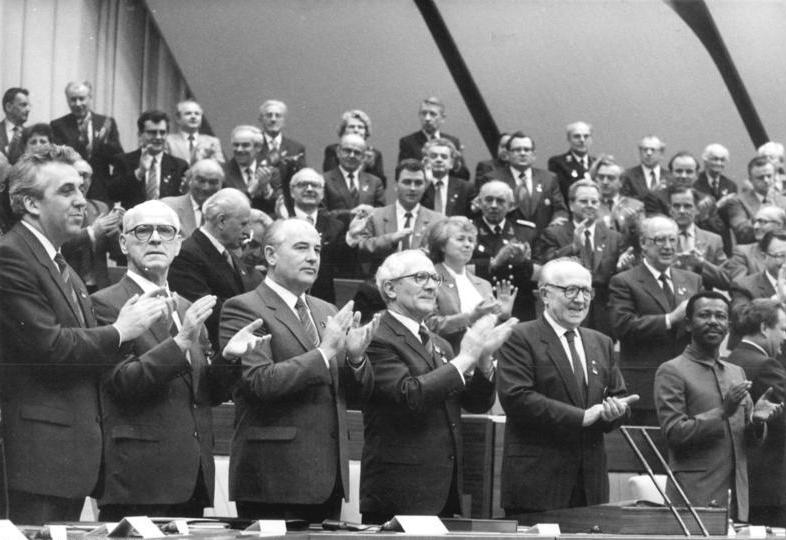
Mengistu Haile Mariam (fifth in row) at SED Party Congress in Berlin, April 1986

By the 1990, the Derg and Soviet Union relations was deteriorated after Mengistu Haile Mariam banned the Ethiopian media to use the term glasnost and perestroika, defying Mikhail Gorbachev who was believed has not fondness for him. By early 1990, Mengistu helped emigration of the Ethiopian Jews to Israel by which many Jewish organizations and US Congress discerned Mengistu's task in the lobbying effort.

=== Federal Democratic Republic era ===
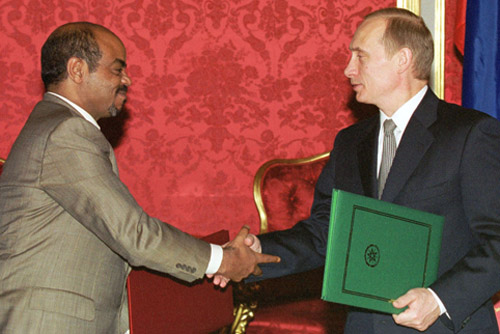
Prime Minister Meles Zenawi with Russian President Vladimir Putin on 3 December 2001

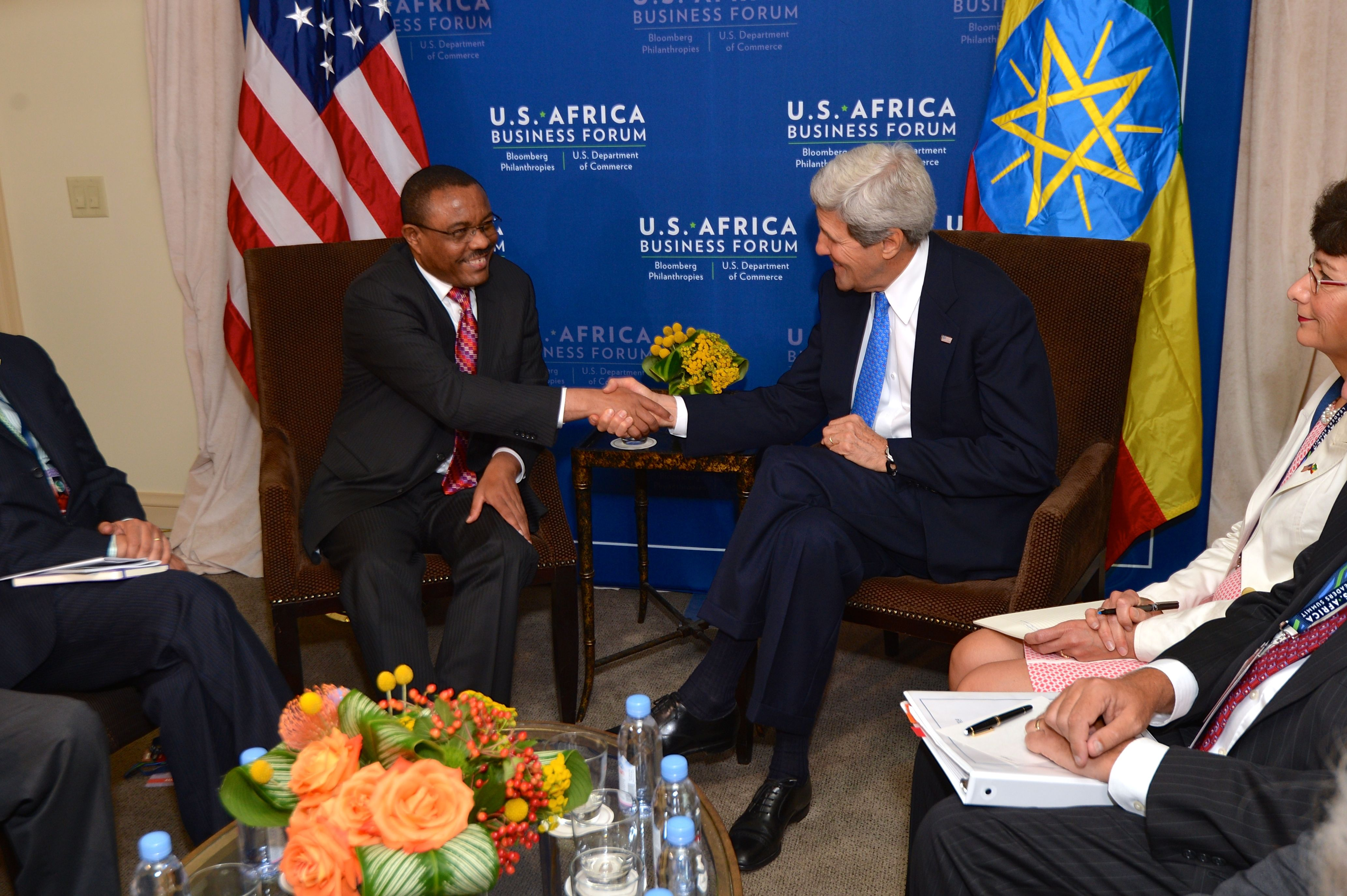
Former US Secretary of State John Kerry with Hailemariam Desalegn in 2014

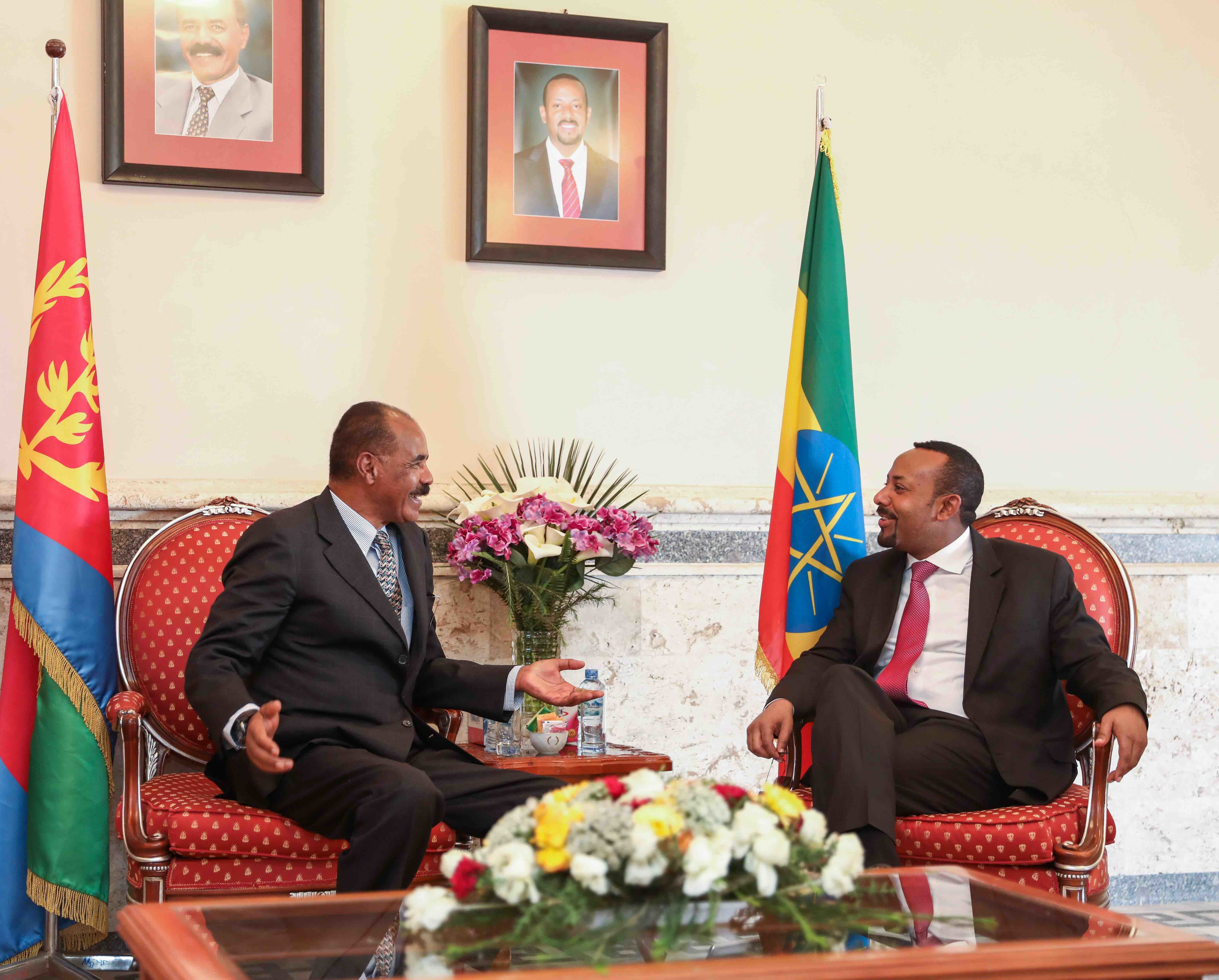
Prime Minister Abiy Ahmed with Eritrean president Isaias Afwerki meeting on 3 March 2019

After defeating the Derg in 1991, the newly formed coalition the Ethiopian People's Revolutionary Democratic Front (EPRDF), led by President and later Prime Minister Meles Zenawi, experienced opposition from factions in Somalia as well as within the country; in May 1991, a pan-Islamist Al-Itihaad al-Islamiya (Islamic Unity) established to consolidate Somalia's power in the Greater Somalia. Relations with Eritrea was somewhat better intensified after its UN-sponsored session from Ethiopia in May 1993.

Later in 1998, their relations was deteriorated after large-scale Eritrean mechanized force penetrated to Badme region, triggering the Eritrean–Ethiopian War. Both countries spent favorable amount of armaments ahead of the war and suffered reportedly 100,000 casualties combined as a direct consequence thereof, excluding indeterminate number of refugees. In December 2000, the two countries government signed Algiers Agreement which finalized the war and created binding judicial commissions, the Eritrea–Ethiopia Border Commission and the Eritrean–Ethiopian Claims Commissions, to oversee the disputed border and related claims. Since then, there was elevated tensions with border conflict and stalemate what is described "war footing" and "no-war-no-peace" with absence of foreign and domestic policy domination. This was ended after Prime Minister Abiy Ahmed came to power in 2018, signed the 2018 Eritrea–Ethiopia summit on 8–9 July.

Meles' government relations with Djibouti was friendly as Djibouti accessed Port of Djibouti to Ethiopia. Ethiopia had 90% imports arrived from Port of Djibouti and 95% of Djiboutian regional exports. In 2006, the Islamic Courts Union (ICU) virtually controlled the whole of southern Somalia and successfully united Mogadishu and imposed Shari'a law. With support of the Transitional Federal Government of Somalia, Ethiopia, under UN peacekeeping mission against war on terrorism, attacked ICU. The ICU's split eventually led to the formation of Al-Shabaab, regrouping to continue the insurgency against TFG and Ethiopian military presence in Somalia.

In May 2010, the Nile Basin Initiative was signed by five upstream countries such as Ethiopia, Tanzania, Uganda, Kenya, and Rwanda and Burundi as Egypt considerate as breach to the 1929 Anglo-Egyptian treaty that gave its right to share water. On 2 April 2011, the Grand Ethiopian Renaissance Dam (GERD) inaugurated construction expected producing 15,000 megawatts of power within 10 years, spending 12 billion dollars of strategy to improve power generating capabilities. Egypt and Sudan continued objecting the filling of the dam in 2020.

Under Abiy Ahmed premiership since 2018, Ethiopia repleted its relations Somalia and Eritrea. In October 2018, Ethiopia signed peace agreement with the rebel faction ONLF ending 34 year long conflict since 1984. ONLF has clashed with the Ethiopian troops to contain vast oil and gas deposits, where Chinese oil firms developing two gas field in the area. In 2007, ONLF launched deadly attack against Chinese-run oil field which killed 65 Ethiopians and 9 Chinese nationals.

During the Tigray War, Ethiopia was allied to countries such as Turkey, United Arab Emirates and Iran who supplied drones to the Ethiopian government. With involvement of Eritrean Defence Forces (EDF), the US President Joe Biden designated six targets of sanction per Executive Order 14046, which was signed in September 2021.

== Diplomatic relations ==
List of countries which Ethiopia maintains diplomatic relations with:

#	Country	Date
1	France	20 March 1897
2	United Kingdom	14 May 1897
3	Italy	24 June 1897
4	United States	27 December 1903
5	Greece	25 November 1917
6	Belgium	25 March 1923
7	Egypt	1927
8	Japan	18 November 1930
9	Yemen	22 March 1935
10	Colombia	1 January 1937
11	Russia	21 April 1943
12	Poland	1 September 1943
13	Czech Republic	11 February 1944
14	Norway	28 April 1945
15	Chile	16 October 1945
16	Sweden	27 December 1945
17	India	1 July 1948
18	Austria	23 July 1948
19	Saudi Arabia	25 May 1949
20	Lebanon	31 July 1949
21	Syria	31 July 1949
22	Iraq	14 September 1949
23	Mexico	1 November 1949
24	Denmark	21 February 1950
25	Venezuela	19 September 1950
26	Netherlands	6 November 1950
27	Iran	1950
28	Brazil	9 January 1951
29	Spain	27 April 1951
30	Serbia	4 March 1952
31	Switzerland	2 May 1952
32	Germany	23 January 1954
33	Bulgaria	3 June 1956
34	Sudan	27 June 1956
—	Holy See	20 March 1957
35	Romania	2 July 1957
36	Turkey	23 December 1957
37	Pakistan	28 December 1957
38	Liberia	4 June 1958
39	Albania	26 June 1958
40	Portugal	6 January 1959
41	Haiti	5 April 1959
42	Ghana	10 April 1959
43	Finland	17 July 1959
44	Hungary	17 November 1959
45	Jordan	16 May 1960
46	Nigeria	1 October 1960
47	Somalia	14 December 1960
48	Indonesia	20 June 1961
49	Israel	24 October 1961
50	Guinea	22 June 1962
51	Tunisia	31 July 1962
52	Morocco	5 August 1963
53	Cameroon	9 August 1963
54	Kenya	12 December 1963
55	South Korea	23 December 1963
56	Democratic Republic of the Congo	1963
57	Mali	23 March 1964
58	Thailand	10 April 1964
59	Tanzania	1 June 1964
60	Uganda	4 June 1964
61	Malawi	30 July 1964
68	Senegal	1964
62	Malaysia	April 1965
63	Burundi	9 June 1965
64	Trinidad and Tobago	7 July 1965
65	Zambia	8 July 1965
66	Niger	6 October 1965
67	Canada	13 October 1965
69	Australia	13 December 1965
70	Ivory Coast	4 March 1966
71	Jamaica	22 March 1966
72	Benin	7 May 1966
73	Mauritania	21 September 1966
74	Kuwait	9 October 1966
75	Gambia	17 October 1966
76	Rwanda	26 October 1966
77	Mongolia	24 January 1967
78	Panama	17 August 1967
79	Peru	10 September 1967
80	Botswana	19 October 1967
81	Republic of the Congo	1967
82	Gabon	1967
83	Sierra Leone	26 March 1968
84	Argentina	28 March 1968
85	Burkina Faso	11 April 1968
86	Iceland	20 May 1968
87	Singapore	31 March 1969
88	Chad	21 October 1969
89	Central African Republic	15 September 1970
90	Guyana	13 October 1970
91	China	24 November 1970
92	Equatorial Guinea	1970
93	Eswatini	1 January 1971
—	Sovereign Military Order of Malta	February 1971
94	Nepal	15 April 1971
95	Sri Lanka	1972
96	Costa Rica	18 March 1974
97	North Korea	5 June 1975
98	Cuba	18 July 1975
99	Libya	11 October 1975
100	Vietnam	23 February 1976
101	Bangladesh	19 September 1976
102	Philippines	7 February 1977
103	Angola	13 July 1977
104	Cambodia	15 September 1979
105	Grenada	17 September 1979
106	Djibouti	15 December 1979
107	Cyprus	7 March 1980
108	Luxembourg	19 March 1980
109	Lesotho	22 July 1980
110	Zimbabwe	August 1980
111	Afghanistan	6 September 1981
112	Seychelles	14 April 1982
113	Algeria	6 November 1982
114	Malta	30 November 1982
115	Togo	11 December 1982
116	Cape Verde	October 1983
117	Mozambique	10 December 1983
118	Nicaragua	7 May 1984
119	Bolivia	8 December 1987
—	State of Palestine	6 April 1989
120	Namibia	1990
121	Azerbaijan	2 November 1992
122	Slovenia	6 November 1992
123	Ukraine	1 April 1993
124	United Arab Emirates	5 May 1993
—	Eritrea (suspended)	22 May 1993
125	Georgia	29 June 1993
126	Armenia	2 December 1993
127	Belarus	18 May 1994
128	Ireland	18 July 1994
129	South Africa	6 January 1995
130	Oman	7 February 1995
131	Slovakia	10 May 1995
132	Qatar	16 July 1995
133	Croatia	17 October 1995
134	Mauritius	June 1996
135	Uzbekistan	15 July 1996
136	Lithuania	19 October 1998
137	Bahrain	28 November 1999
138	North Macedonia	17 July 2000
139	Saint Vincent and the Grenadines	16 February 2004
140	Saint Lucia	3 August 2004
141	Estonia	23 August 2005
142	Laos	9 December 2005
143	Bosnia and Herzegovina	12 February 2007
144	Dominican Republic	27 September 2007
145	Latvia	11 March 2008
146	Dominica	2009
147	Paraguay	29 September 2010
148	Fiji	6 January 2011
149	Uruguay	23 March 2011
150	Montenegro	10 June 2011
151	Kazakhstan	5 September 2011
152	New Zealand	6 December 2011
153	Solomon Islands	22 December 2011
154	Ecuador	23 January 2012
155	South Sudan	27 February 2012
156	Guatemala	20 June 2012
157	Tajikistan	3 July 2012
158	Moldova	24 June 2013
159	Antigua and Barbuda	1 November 2014
160	Turkmenistan	11 November 2015
161	Myanmar	28 December 2015
162	Kyrgyzstan	23 July 2016
163	El Salvador	28 October 2016
164	Saint Kitts and Nevis	1 March 2017
165	Guinea-Bissau	21 June 2017
166	Maldives	6 August 2018
167	San Marino	7 November 2018
168	Monaco	20 October 2020
169	Bahamas	7 September 2025
170	Barbados	7 September 2025
171	Comoros	Unknown
172	Madagascar	Unknown
—	Sahrawi Arab Democratic Republic	Unknown

== Africa ==
Country	Formal Relations Began	Notes
Djibouti	15 December 1979	See Djibouti–Ethiopia relations Both countries established diplomatic relations on 15 December 1979. The border between the two countries is based on the Franco-Ethiopian convention of 20 March 1897, which was later finalized in a protocol dated 16 January 1954 and rendered effective on 28 February of that year. In October 1991, the Ethiopian and Djiboutian governments signed a Treaty of Friendship and Cooperation further solidifying relations. Since 1991, the two countries have signed over 39 protocol agreements. Djibouti remains a major economic partner of Ethiopia. On 13 April 2002, the two countries signed an agreement concerning the use of the Port of Djibouti and the transit of cargo, which was later ratified by the Ethiopian Federal Parliamentary Assembly on 4 June of the same year. About 70% of the Port of Djibouti's activity consists of imports to and exports from neighboring Ethiopia, which depends on the harbour as its main maritime outlet. The port also serves as an international refueling center and transshipment hub. Additionally, both countries share ownership of the Addis Ababa-Djibouti Railroad.
Egypt		See Egypt–Ethiopia relations As two of the oldest independent states in Africa, both countries have an ancient relationship in many forms. The Ethiopian Orthodox Tewahedo Church was under the administration of the Coptic Orthodox Church from ancient times until 1959. Ethiopian and Egyptian armies clashed in the early 19th century over control of territory in what is modern Sudan, and Ethiopia's access to the Red Sea. Both countries established formal diplomatic ties in 1927. More recently, because both countries share a special relationship over the Nile basin, both are members of the Nile Basin Initiative. In 2010s, both countries relationship was deteriorated as a result of Ethiopia failed to reach trilateral agreement with Sudan regarding the Grand Ethiopian Renaissance Dam project advanced. In 2021, Ethiopia closed its embassy in Cairo due to financial reasons.
Eritrea	22 May 1993 (Diplomatic ties severed 1 October 2026)	See Eritrea–Ethiopia relations Both countries established diplomatic relations on 22 May 1993 when first Ambassador of the Transitional Government of Ethiopia's to Eritrea Mr. Awalom Woldu Tuku presented his credentials to President Issaias Afwerki. Diplomatic relations were broken on 12 May 1998 when Ethiopia and Eritrea went to war over the disputed border area of Badme. Diplomatic relations were restored on 8 July 2018: The boundary between these two countries is based on three treaties between Ethiopia and Italy, in 1900, 1902, and 1908. However no part of the shared boundary was afterwards demarcated.; From 1950 until 1993, Eritrea was federated as part of Ethiopia. During much of this period, a number of Eritreans fought for independence from Ethiopia. The federation was ended with an April 1993 plebiscite which approved Eritrea's full independence.; Disputes over Eritrea's border alignment led to the Eritrean-Ethiopian War (1998–2000), which was resolved by an independent boundary commission's delimitation decision in 2002. However, demarcation has been delayed, despite intense international intervention, by Ethiopian insistence that the decision ignored "human geography," made technical errors in the delimitation, and determined that certain disputed areas, specifically Badme, fall to Eritrea. Eritrea meanwhile insists on not deviating from the commission's decision. The peacekeepers monitoring the disputed boundary were forced to withdraw in July 2008 having considered their remaining options after experiencing serious difficulties in supporting its troops.; In July 2018, leaders both countries signed a peace treaty to put a formal end to a state of war between both nations paving the way for greater economic cooperation and improved ties between them.; On 1 October 2026, Eritrea severed diplomatic relations with Ethiopia.
Kenya	26 June 1964	See Ethiopia–Kenya relations Both countries established diplomatic relations on 26 June 1964 and opened Ethiopian Embassy in Nairobi. Relations between Kenya and Ethiopia date back to the 1954, when the Ethiopian authorities under Haile Selassie I established an honorary consulate general in the British Kenya Colony. In 1961, prior to Kenya's independence, Ethiopia appointed its first ambassador to Kenya, and six years later Kenya opened an embassy in Addis Ababa. The border between the two countries is based on a treaty signed by Ethiopia and Kenya on 9 June 1970, which determines the present-day boundary, abrogating all previous boundary treaties. This border has been subjected to demarcation.
Namibia		Ethiopia–Namibia relations refers to the current and historical relationship between Ethiopia and Namibia. During the South African occupation of Namibia, Ethiopia was one of the country's leading proponents abroad; Ethiopia and Liberia were the first two states to bring the question of independence for then South West Africa to the United Nations. Namibia gained independence in 1990. In 2007, the two governments signed an agreement which expanded air travel between the two states. In December 2009, Namibia's Foreign Minister, Marko Hausiku met with Ethiopian Foreign Affairs Minister Seyoum Mesfin and noted the economic, science, technical and cultural agreements in place between the two countries and expressed a desire to improve the trade relations.: Ethiopia is accredited to Namibia from its embassy in Pretoria, South Africa.; Namibia has an embassy in Addis Ababa.
Nigeria		Main article: Ethiopia–Nigeria relations: Ethiopia has an embassy in Abuja.; Nigeria has an embassy in Addis Ababa.
Somalia		See Ethiopia–Somalia relations Relations between the peoples of Somalia and Ethiopia stretch back to antiquity, to a common origin. The Ethiopian region is one of the proposed homelands of the Horn of Africa's various Afro-Asiatic communities. During the Middle Ages, Somali Imam Ahmad ibn Ibrihim al-Ghazi (Ahmad Gurey or Gragn) led a Conquest of Abyssinia (Futuh al-Habash), which brought three-quarters of the Christian Ethiopian Empire under the power of the Muslim Adal Sultanate. With an army mainly composed of Somalis, Many historians trace the origins of tensions between Somalia and Ethiopia to this war. In the 1960s and 1970s, a territorial dispute over the Ogaden region led to various armed confrontations between the Somalian and Ethiopian militaries. The tensions culminated in the Ogaden War, which saw the Somali army capture most of the disputed territory by September 1977, before finally being expelled by a coalition of communist forces. With changes in leadership in the early 1990s brought on by the start of the Somali Civil War and Ethiopian Civil War, respectively, relations between the Somali and Ethiopian authorities entered a new phase of military cooperation against the Islamic Courts Union (ICU) rebel group and its more radical successor Al-Shabaab. In October 2011, a coordinated multinational operation began against Al-Shabaab in southern Somalia; the Ethiopian military eventually joined the Transitional Federal Government-led mission the following month. The Federal Government of Somalia was later established on 20 August 2012, representing the first permanent central government in the country since the start of the civil war. The following month, Hassan Sheikh Mohamud was elected as the new Somali government's first President, with the Ethiopian authorities welcoming his selection and newly appointed Prime Minister of Ethiopia Hailemariam Desalegn attending Mohamud's inauguration ceremony.
Somaliland		See Ethiopia–Somaliland relations Somaliland has had decent economic relations with Ethiopia since the Eritrean–Ethiopian War, as a large part of Ethiopian exports have been handled via the port of Berbera, since Ethiopia can no longer use Eritrean ports of Massaua and Assab. These relationships stand in contrast to the "traditional hostility" towards Ethiopia felt by many Somalis in other areas, and against the background of low support among many northern Somalis for Siad Barre's Ogaden War against Ethiopia and the Somali National Movement which Ethiopia assisted financially. So far, however, these have not led to official Ethiopian recognition. On 1 January 2024, Ethiopia and Somaliland signed a pact giving Ethiopia access to the Red Sea in return for eventual recognition, making it potentially the second UN member state to do so.
South Africa	6 January 1995	See Ethiopia–South Africa relations Both countries established diplomatic relations on 6 January 1995: Ethiopia has an embassy in Pretoria.; South Africa has an embassy in Addis Ababa.
Sudan	27 June 1956	See Ethiopia–Sudan relations Alodia and the Kingdom of Makuria had some relations with Ethiopia in medieval times. The Ethiopian Empire fought against Mahdist Sudan in the Mahdist War. Ethiopia and Sudan first established formal relations in 1956. Relations between Ethiopia and Sudan were very good following the end of the Ethiopian Civil War, due to the support that the Sudanese government had given to the Ethiopian People's Revolutionary Democratic Front. However, relations were strained for a time following the 26 June 1995 assassination attempt against Egyptian president Hosni Mubarak as he was leaving the OAU summit meeting in Addis Ababa. The subsequent investigation revealed that Sudan was involved in this act, forcing the Ethiopian government to take a series of steps against Sudan that September, which included closing the Sudanese consulate in Gambela, reducing the number of Sudanese embassy staff, and terminating all Sudan Airways and Ethiopian Airlines flights between the two countries. However the start of the Eritrean-Ethiopian War led to Sudan and Ethiopia put this conflict between them and normalizing their relations by November 1999 when president Omar Hassan al-Bashir made a formal visit to Addis Ababa. A protocol concerning Ethiopian access to Port Sudan was signed between the two countries 5 March 2000 in Khartoum, and this protocol and its subsequent amendment were ratified by the Ethiopian Federal Parliamentary Assembly on 3 July 2003. Efforts to demarcate the porous boundary with Sudan were delayed by the Second Sudanese Civil War. In May 2008, residents along the western Ethiopian border reportedly discovered that the government had agreed to demarcate this boundary when Sudanese soldiers forced them out of their homes. It was reported that as many as 2,000 people were displaced in the Gambela Region, and the Sudanese army reportedly set fire to two dozen Ethiopian farms and imprisoned 34 people in the Amhara Region. However, Prime Minister Meles Zenawi publicly denied that any Ethiopians had been displaced by this agreement. Negotiations over this boundary continues, with the twelfth meeting of the Boundary Commission announced 28 December 2009 at Mek'ele, with Ethiopian representatives from the Tigray, Benishangul-Gumuz, Amhara and Gambela Regions, and from the Sudanese side representatives of the Upper Nile, Blue Nile, Sennar and Al Qadarif Administrations. Despite these border tensions, Sudan remains a major economic partner of Ethiopia. According to the Ethiopian Petroleum Supplier Enterprise (EPSE), Ethiopia in April 2013 imported around $1.12 billion worth of oil from Sudan over the previous six months. In total, about 85% of Ethiopia's yearly oil consumption comes from Sudan via the Port of Djibouti. Ethiopia and Sudan are also in the process of linking their power grids. In 2010s, Sudan—Egypt—Ethiopia joint relations deteriorated as a result of failing to reach a trilateral agreement regarding the Grand Ethiopian Renaissance Dam project. During the Tigray War in 2020, there was unresolved clash between their borders, further damaging relations.
South Sudan	2011	See Ethiopia–South Sudan relations: Ethiopia has an embassy of South Sudan in Addis Ababa; South Sudan has embassy of Ethiopia in Juba

== Americas ==
Country	Formal Relations Began	Notes
Brazil	9 January 1951	See Brazil–Ethiopia relations Both countries established diplomatic relations on 9 January 1951 when was accredited first Minister of Ethiopia to Brazil Mr. Blatta Dawit Ogbazgy: Brazil has an embassy in Addis Ababa.; Ethiopia has an embassy in Brasília.
Canada	13 October 1965	See Canada–Ethiopia relations Both countries established diplomatic relations on 13 October 1965: Canada has an embassy in Addis Ababa.; Ethiopia has an embassy in Ottawa; See also: Ethiopian Canadian
Cuba	18 July 1975	See Cuba–Ethiopia relations Both countries established diplomatic relations on 18 July 1975: Cuba has an embassy in Addis Ababa.; Ethiopia has an embassy in Havana.
Jamaica	22 March 1966	See Jamaica–Ethiopia relations Both countries established diplomatic relations on 22 March 1966: Jamaica has an embassy in Addis Ababa.; Ethiopia has an embassy in Kingston.
Mexico	1 November 1949	See Ethiopia–Mexico relations Both countries established diplomatic relations on 1 November 1949: During the Second Italo-Ethiopian War, Mexico was one of the member states of the League of Nations to condemn the occupation of Ethiopia and support the League's sanctions against Italy. Since then, relations between the two nations have strengthened.; In Addis Ababa, Ethiopia named a square in the capital "Mexico Square." Mexico, in turn, named a metro station in Mexico City called Metro Etiopía.; Mexico has an embassy in Addis Ababa.; Ethiopia is accredited to Mexico from its embassy in Washington, D.C., United States.
United States	27 December 1903	See Ethiopia–United States relations: Ethiopia is a strategic partner of the United States in the Global War on Terrorism.; U.S. development assistance to Ethiopia is focused on reducing famine vulnerability, hunger, and poverty and emphasizes economic, governance, and social sector policy reforms.; Ethiopia has an embassy in Washington, D.C., and a consulate-general in Los Angeles.; United States has an embassy in Addis Ababa.; See also: Ethiopian American

== Asia ==
Country	Formal Relations Began	Notes
Armenia	2 December 1993	See Armenia–Ethiopia relations: Both countries established diplomatic relations on 2 December 1993; Armenia has an embassy in Addis Ababa.; Ethiopia is accredited to Armenia from its embassy in Moscow, Russia.; Both nations have among the oldest Christian communities.
Azerbaijan	2 November 1992	See Azerbaijan–Ethiopia relations: On 2 November 1992, Azerbaijan and Ethiopia signed a Protocol on the establishment of diplomatic relations.; Azerbaijan has an embassy in Addis Ababa.; Ethiopia maintains an honorary consulate in Baku, Azerbaijan.
China	24 November 1970	See China–Ethiopia relations Both countries established diplomatic relations on 24 November 1970: China has an embassy in Addis Ababa.; Ethiopia has an embassy in Beijing and consulates-general in Chongqing, Guangzhou and Shanghai.
India	1 July 1948	See Ethiopia–India relations Both countries established diplomatic relations on 1 July 1948: Ethiopia has an embassy in New Delhi.; India has an embassy in Addis Ababa.; India trains Ethiopian personnel under its ITEC program and is Ethiopia's second largest source of Foreign Direct Investments.; The Second India-Africa Forum Summit was held in Addis Ababa in 2011 and India launched its Pan-African e-Network Project in Ethiopia in 2007.
Indonesia		See Ethiopia–Indonesia relations: Ethiopia has an embassy in Jakarta.; Indonesia has an embassy in Addis Ababa.
Iran		Ethiopia is accredited to Iran from its embassy in Doha, Qatar.; Iran has an embassy in Addis Ababa.
Israel	24 October 1961	See Ethiopia–Israel relations Both countries established diplomatic relations on 24 October 1961 when Ethiopia recognized Israel de jure, and agreed to raise the consulate in Addis Ababa to the level of an embassy. Ethiopia severance diplomatic relations with Israel on 23 October 1973. Diplomatic relations were resumed on 3 November 1989: Ethiopia has an embassy in Tel Aviv.; Israel has an embassy in Addis Ababa.; See also: Ethiopian Jews in Israel, Operation Moses, Operation Solomon, History of the Jews in Ethiopia; Ethiopian Ministry of Foreign Affairs about relations with Israel
Japan	1930	See Ethiopia–Japan relations: Japan and Ethiopia explored diplomatic and economic relations in the 1930s in response to perceived common interests; however these contacts lapsed with the commencement of the Second Italo-Ethiopian War; Relations were reestablished in 1955 and ambassadors exchanged in 1958.; Ethiopia has an embassy in Tokyo.; Japan has an embassy in Addis Ababa.
Malaysia		See Ethiopia–Malaysia relations: Ethiopia has a consulate-general in Kuala Lumpur, while Malaysia doesn't have any embassy in Ethiopia.; Malaysia is one of the major trade partner and also one of the largest investors in Ethiopia.
Qatar	16 July 1995	See Ethiopia–Qatar relations Both countries established diplomatic relations on 16 July 1995: Ethiopia abruptly broke diplomatic ties with Qatar in April 2008, apparently due to statements made by the Al-Jazeera news channel which is based in Qatar.
South Korea	23 December 1963	See Ethiopia–South Korea relations Between The Federal Democratic Republic of Ethiopia and The Republic of Korea were established diplomatic relations on 23 December 1963.: Infantry men of 6,037 from Ethiopia have participated in the Korean War to help South Korea.; The number of South Koreans living in Ethiopia in 2016 were about 460.; The Republic of Korea's official development assistance from 1991 to 2014 was about 88.61m USD.; The Federal Democratic Republic of Ethiopia has an embassy in Seoul.; Since 1965 South Korea has an embassy in Addis Ababa.
Turkey	1896	See also Ethiopia–Turkey relations: Ethiopia has an embassy in Ankara.; Turkey has an embassy in Addis Ababa.; Trade volume between the two countries was US$398.8 million in 2019 (Ethiopian exports/imports: 27.5/378.3 USD).

== Europe ==
Country	Date	Notes
Czech Republic	11 February 1944	Czechoslovakia and Ethiopia established diplomatic relations on 11 February 1944. The Federal Democratic Republic of Ethiopia (FDRE) recognized the new Czech Republic as on 1 January 1993, and established diplomatic relations accordingly.: Ethiopia is accredited to the Czech Republic from its embassy in Berlin, Germany.; Czech Republic has an embassy in Addis Ababa.
Denmark	21 February 1950	See Denmark–Ethiopia relations Both countries established diplomatic relations on 21 February 1950 when first Envoy Extraordinary and Minister Plenipotentiary of Denmark to Ethiopia (resident of Athens) Mr. Hubert Wichfeld presented his credentials. 20 January 1967 both countries was raised their diplomatic missions to Embassy level: Denmark has an embassy in Addis Ababa.; Ethiopia is accredited to Denmark from its embassy in Stockholm, Sweden.
Finland	17 July 1959	See Ethiopia–Finland relations Both countries established diplomatic relations on 17 July 1959.: Ethiopia is represented in Finland through its embassy in Stockholm, Sweden.; Finland has an embassy in Addis Ababa.
France	20 March 1897	See Ethiopia–France relations Both countries established diplomatic relations on 20 March 1897: Ethiopia has an embassy in Paris.; France has an embassy in Addis Ababa.
Germany	7 March 1905	See Ethiopia–Germany relations: Both countries established diplomatic relations when signed a treaty of friendship on 7 March 1905; a German Legation was opened in Addis Ababa in 1907, and an Ethiopian embassy in Berlin the same year.; Germany supported Ethiopia in the Second Italo-Abyssinian War.; Ethiopia has an embassy in Berlin.; Germany has an embassy in Addis Ababa.
Greece		See Ethiopia–Greece relations: Ethiopia is accredited to Greece from its embassy in Rome, Italy.; Greece has an embassy in Addis Ababa.
Ireland	1994	See Ethiopia–Ireland relations Both countries established diplomatic relations in 1994: Ethiopia closed its embassy in Dublin in 2021.; Since 1994, Ireland has an embassy in Addis Ababa.
Italy	24 June 1897	See Ethiopia–Italy relations Both countries established diplomatic relations on 24 June 1897.: Italy was one of the first European countries to open diplomatic relations with Ethiopia.; Both countries have fought two wars against each other: the First Italo-Ethiopian War and the Second Italo-Ethiopian War; Total trade volume between two countries reached 455,928,352.26 Birr in 2011.; Italy has an embassy in Addis Ababa.; Ethiopia has an embassy in Rome.
Netherlands		Ethiopia is accredited to the Netherlands from its embassy in Brussels, Belgium.; the Netherlands has an embassy in Addis Ababa.
Poland	14 July 1945	See Ethiopia–Poland relations Both countries established diplomatic relations on 14 July 1945: Ethiopia is accredited to Poland from its embassy in Berlin, Germany.; Poland has an embassy in Addis Ababa.
Romania	2 July 1957	Both countries established diplomatic relations on 2 July 1957: Ethiopia is accredited to Romania from its Permanent Mission in Geneva, Switzerland.; Romania has an embassy in Addis Ababa.; Ethiopian Ministry of Foreign Affairs about bilateral relations with Romania
Russia	21 April 1943	See Ethiopia–Russia relations Both countries established diplomatic relations on 21 April 1943: Russia has an embassy in Addis Ababa.; Ethiopia has an embassy in Moscow. The Ethiopian ambassador to Russia is also accredited to Armenia, Azerbaijan, Belarus, Georgia, Kazakhstan, Kyrgyzstan, Moldova, Tajikistan, Turkmenistan, Ukraine, and Uzbekistan.; The history of this relationship has its origins in the 19th century. Russia supplied the mountain guns the Ethiopian army used in the Battle of Adwa.; More recently, the Soviet Union was a major source of military and economic aid under the Derg and during the People's Democratic Republic of Ethiopia.; See also Alexander Bulatovich; Relations are somewhat unsure owing to Russia's close ties with Ethiopia's neighboring rival, Sudan.
Serbia	4 March 1952	See Ethiopia–Serbia relations Both countries established diplomatic relations on 4 March 1952: Serbia has an embassy in Addis Ababa.; Ethiopia is accredited Serbia from its embassy in Rome, Italy.; Ethiopia is a strong advocate for Serbia on the issue of Kosovo.; The first vessel in the Ethiopian Navy was a gift from Yugoslavia.; The Serbian embassy is the former villa of Yugoslav President Josip Broz Tito, which was given as a gift by Haile Selassie; On 27 January 2012, after traveling to Addis Ababa in order to reaffirm Ethiopia's stance on Kosovo regarding Serbia, Vuk Jeremić and Haile Mariam signed a memorandum of understanding between the two nations' ministries of foreign affairs.
Spain	27 April 1951	See Ethiopia–Spain relations Both countries established diplomatic relations on 27 April 1951: Ethiopia is accredited to Spain from its embassy in Paris.; Spain has an embassy in Addis Ababa.
Sweden		See Ethiopia–Sweden relations: Ethiopia has an embassy in Stockholm.; Sweden has an embassy in Addis Ababa.
United Kingdom	1841	See Ethiopia–United Kingdom relations Ethiopian Emperor Haile Selassie with British Prime Minister Winston Churchill in 10 Downing Street, October 1954. The UK established diplomatic relations with the United Kingdom in 1841.: Ethiopia maintains an embassy in London.; The United Kingdom is accredited to Ethiopia through its embassy in Addis Ababa.; The UK administered Ethiopia from 1941 to 1942. The UK continued to administered the regions of Ogaden and Haud from 1941, until both territories were relinquished to Ethiopia in 1948 and 1955 respectively. Both countries share common membership of the United Nations. Bilaterally the two countries have a Development Partnership, a Double Taxation Convention, and an Investment Agreement.

== Oceania ==
Country	Date	Notes
Australia		Australia has an embassy in Addis Ababa.; Ethiopia has an embassy in Canberra.
New Zealand		Ethiopia is accredited to New Zealand from its embassy in Canberra, Australia.; New Zealand has an embassy in Addis Ababa.

== United Nations ==
Ethiopia was admitted to the League of Nations on 28 September 1923, becoming one of few African countries to do so due to not colonized by European powers during the 19th century Scramble for Africa. The League envisaged the membership for Ethiopia's "collective security" and protection against external attacks. The League however was unable to maintain Ethiopia's sovereignty as Japan invaded Manchuria, which Italy invaded Ethiopia in 1936.

After its resumption of independence after World War II, Ethiopia was one of the founding members of the United Nations. Since the 1950s, Ethiopia has keeping UN peacekeeping missions toward Korean War and Congo Crisis and some African states like Rwanda and Burundi in 1990s. Ethiopia has now over 80,000 peacekeeping forces that are active.

The UN delivers development and humanitarian plan in Ethiopia with 28 representatives of funds and specialized agencies in the UN Country Team (UNCT). Ethiopia is non-permanent member of the UN Security Council which has close cooperation with the regional organizations the African Union and the Intergovernmental Authority on Development (IGAD).

== European Union ==
Ethiopia has strong relations to the European Union while the EU funding financed by the European Development Fund (EDF) with objectives of resilience. Their relations has been defined by Cotonou Agreement article 8 to 13 with strong bilateral partners and dialogue regarding sustainable development on diverse aspect of the country.

In addition, the EU is the second largest trade partner for Ethiopia with total expenditure of 4.1 billion euro; exports representing 12% while Ethiopia exports representing 26% of worldwide exports in 2016. This has been compared to China (8%), Somalia (14%) and Kuwait (13%).

== African Union ==
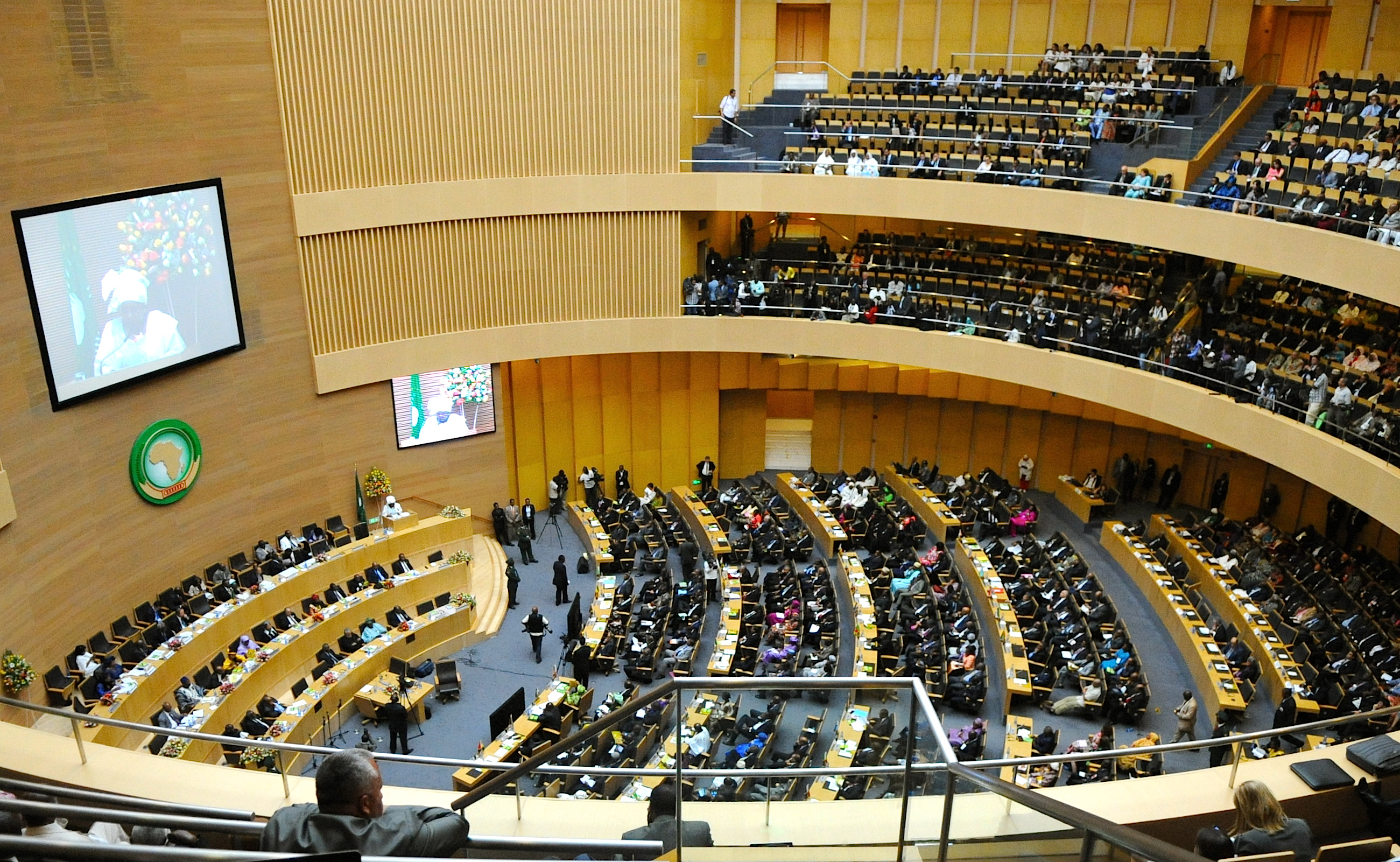
50th anniversary of African Union Summit at Africa Hall in Addis Ababa, 2013

Ethiopia is one of founding African states of the Organization of African Unity (OAU) (now the African Union) on 25 May 1963 under Emperor Haile Selassie, headquartered in Addis Ababa. At the time, the organization evolved up to 54 African states, except Morocco.

The country is driving force of maintaining UN-AU peacekeeping missions, especially in the Horn of Africa region. The AU does not readily aggregate the preference of each member states. Therefore, every AU norms, institution and overlaps as consensus stated in the AU Constitution Act and its various decision and policy making, and implementation organs. As such, the AU offers for member states like Ethiopia to influence and impact on policy internally and regionally. Today, Ethiopian capital Addis Ababa is home of major organizations such as African Union, Pan African Chamber of Commerce and Industry, United Nations Economic Commission for Africa and African Standby Force.

== BRICS ==
In 2023, Ethiopia was invited to join BRICS during the group's 15th Summit and became a member of the organization in January 2024.

== See also ==
- Category:Ethiopian diaspora
- Foreign aid to Ethiopia
- List of diplomatic missions in Ethiopia
- List of diplomatic missions of Ethiopia
- Ministry of Foreign Affairs
