= Armenia–Ethiopia relations =

Bilateral relations

- Armenia: Ethiopia

Diplomatic mission
- Embassy of Armenia, Addis Ababa: Embassy of Ethiopia, Yerevan

Envoy
- Ambassador of Armenia in Ethiopia Artem Aznaurian: Ambassador of Ethiopia in Armenia Alemayehu Tegenu

The Armenia–Ethiopia relations are bilateral relations between Armenia and Ethiopia. Historically, Ethiopia and Armenia had strong sectarian diplomatic relations in linkage of Orthodox Churches: the Ethiopian Orthodox Tewahedo Church and Armenian Apostolic Church, which are both part of Oriental Orthodoxy. Both had exchanged number of monks and priests for more than centuries.

In the Middle Ages, contact between the two churches marked historical apogee, such as the Ethiopian religious leader Ewostatewos, who made a journey to Armenia in 1339 and died in Armenia. Armenians continued to grow in number, influenced the diplomacy and judicial position of the Ethiopian Empire. Armenians also remained largely traders, businesspeople and artisans until 1875. Armenian genocide in World War I left many Armenians to migrate in Ethiopia, and by 1935, Armenians constituted the largest foreign ethnic groups behind the Greeks and Indians, with total population of 2,800.

This had been affected by the Ethiopian Revolution and the power seizure of the Derg since 1974, reduced into 120. Today, Armenians left contribute for settlements in Addis Ababa; they broadly live in a place called Armenian Sefer, and noted for Armenian architecture in that area. They established modern diplomatic relationship on 2 December 1993. In 2019, the two countries' incumbent ambassadors were Artem Aznaurian (Armenia) and Alemayehu Tegenu (Ethiopia).

== History ==
The relations between Armenia and Ethiopia goes far more than centuries. Moreover, their mutual connection was linked by the Orthodox Christian Church throughout history. The Ethiopian Orthodox Tewahedo Church is a part of Oriental Orthodox church, gaining independence from Coptic Orthodox Church of Egypt in 1959, while Armenian Apostolic Church shares the same Oriental Orthodox Church communion. According to historian Richard Pankhurst, Armenian and Ethiopian monks socialized in the year of 300 AD while the churches had close connection with Jerusalem. This resulted a number exchange of monks and priests. For this period, the Ethiopian, Syriac and Coptic Churches stood under Armenian Patriarch in Jerusalem. In 1339, the Ethiopian monk Ewostatewos made a journey to Armenia, and died at the place. His disciples then returned to Ethiopia with other things, an Armenian monk became their friend.

Maneos Armenawi, an Armenian priest, came to Ethiopia in 1521 and served as emissary for the Ethiopian queen Heghin in King Manuel of Portugal's court. A number of Armenians served as ambassador of Ethiopia—as their mutual interest increased—in regards to the expansion of Islam growing in the Mediterranean. A clergy named Murad came from the Netherlands served in the Ethiopian Empire was known for church bell. Before larger community formed, most Armenians in the country were businessperson, traders, and monks.

Until 1875, many Armenians served in the Ethiopian court, mainly as diplomats in Europe and Asia, but also as artisans. In 1875, the Egyptian army under Rauf Pasha occupied Harar. Its force was officered by Turks, accompanied by some Armenians. From this time, Armenians formed diaspora in Ethiopia. The Ottoman Turkish genocide against the Armenian Christians in the World War I increasingly led many Armenian refugees in Ethiopia, thereby totaling the country's natural refugees.

During the genocide, there was flock migration of new large diaspora, involving a group of 40 orphans adopted by Emperor Haile Selassie. In 1935, the number of Armenians residing in Ethiopia was about 2,800, making the largest foreign nationals after the Greeks and Indians. The population remained stable until the 1974 revolution, when Armenians numbered more than 1,200. During the seizure of the Derg, Armenians' influence in every institution went impeded but remained insignificant in number into 120. They also have places named after them in Addis Ababa, such as Armenian Sefer, which many houses were built in Armenian architecture. The number of Armenians is more than 75, where majority founded in median age of 60–80 years. On 2 December 1993, modern diplomatic relationship was reestablished.

== Incumbent ambassadors ==
- Ambassador of Armenia in Ethiopia – Artem Aznaurian
- Ambassador of Ethiopia in Armenia – Alemayehu Tegenu

== Resident diplomatic missions ==
- Armenia has an embassy in Addis Ababa.
- Ethiopia is accredited to Armenia from its embassy in Moscow, Russia.

== See also ==
- Foreign relations of Armenia
- Foreign relations of Ethiopia
