= Azerbaijan–Ethiopia relations =

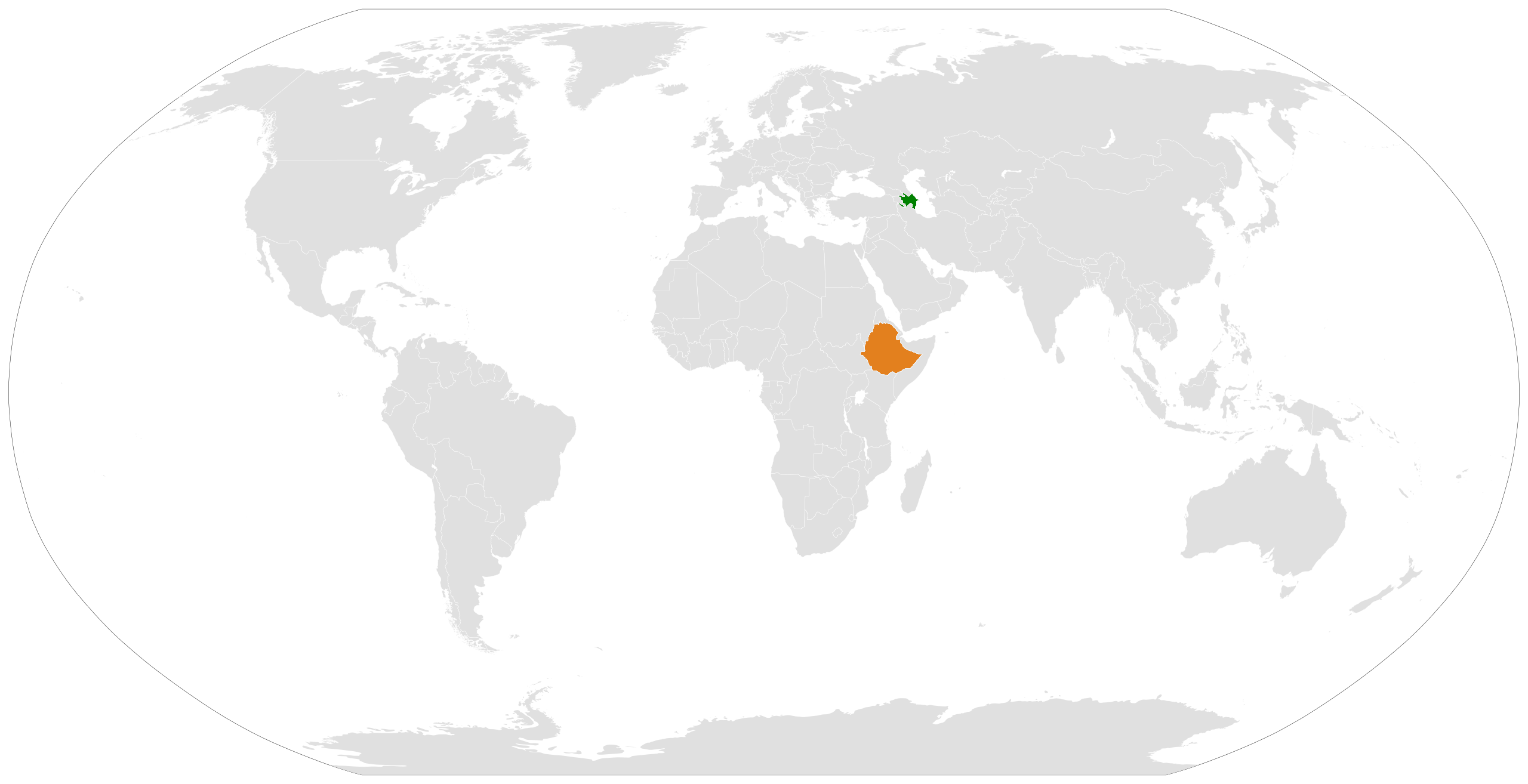

- Azerbaijan: Ethiopia

Azerbaijan–Ethiopia relations refer to bilateral relations between Azerbaijan and Ethiopia. Cooperation is carried out in such areas as economy, trade, education, culture, media, engineering, energy, and medicine. Azerbaijan has an embassy in Addis Ababa. Ethiopia has a non-resident ambassador in Ankara.

== Diplomatic relations ==
Diplomatic relations between Azerbaijan and Ethiopia were established on November 2, 1992. In December 2012, the Milli Majlis (National Assembly) decided to establish the Embassy of Azerbaijan in Ethiopia. The Extraordinary Ambassador of Ethiopia to Azerbaijan is Ayalew Gobezie Workneh. Azerbaijan's representative in Ethiopia is Elman Abdullayev. Since 2017, the honorary Consul of Azerbaijan in Ethiopia has been Jeyhun Alekperov.

In November 2017, Azerbaijani Foreign Minister Elmar Mammadyarov paid an official visit to Ethiopia. During the visit, the Minister met with President of Ethiopia Mulatu Teshome and Foreign Minister of Ethiopia Vorkene Gebeyehu. The meeting resulted in the signing of a "Memorandum of understanding on political consultations between the ministries of Foreign Affairs of the Republic of Azerbaijan and the Federal Democratic Republic of Ethiopia".

== Economic cooperation ==
In May 2017, the Baku Business Center hosted an Azerbaijani-Ethiopian business meeting organized by the Export and Investment Promotion Foundation (AZPROMO). The event was attended by about 30 businessmen working in the textile sector. According to statistics from the UN Trade Office (COMTRADE), in 2017, the volume of exports from Azerbaijan amounted to 438 US dollars. In 2018, the volume of exports from Azerbaijan amounted to 476.400 US dollars.

== International cooperation ==
In the international arena, cooperation between the two countries is carried out within different organizations: the UN, African Union, etc. On February 26, 2016 at the initiative of the Azerbaijani Embassy in Ethiopia there was an event devoted to memory of victims of Khojaly massacre organized in Addis Ababa.

== Cultural ties ==
Since the 1960s, dozens of students from Ethiopia have been studying in Azerbaijan. In 2019, the Azerbaijani feature film "Ali and Nino" was shown at the European film festival in Ethiopia.

== Resident diplomatic missions ==
- Azerbaijan has an embassy in Addis Ababa.
- Ethiopia is accredited to Azerbaijan from its embassy in Ankara, Turkey.

== See also ==
- Foreign relations of Azerbaijan
- Foreign relations of Ethiopia
