= Ethiopia–Turkey relations =

- Ethiopia: Turkey

Diplomatic mission
- Ethiopian embassy, Ankara: Turkish embassy, Addis Ababa

Ethiopia–Turkey relations are foreign relations between Ethiopia and Turkey. Ethiopia has an embassy in Ankara and Turkey has an embassy in Addis Ababa.

== History ==
Relations between the Ethiopian and Ottoman Empires were long contentious, the most notable expression being the Ethiopian–Adal War in the early 16th century, the Adal Sultanate serving as Ottoman proxy. Formal diplomatic relations were established in 1896, and non-resident ambassadors were accredited at this time. Sultan Abdulhamid II sent a delegation headed by his aide-de-camp Azmzade Sadik Al Mouayad Pasha to Emperor Menelik II in 1904. See Azmzade, Sadik, The Ethiopia Book of Travels, 2021 for the translation of Sadik Pasha's diaries on this mission. The Ottoman Empire opened a Consulate-General in Harar in 1910, followed by an Consulate in Addis Ababa in 1912 (after which the consulate in Harar was downgraded to an honorary consulate).

In 1926, following the establishment of the Republic of Turkey, this consulate was upgraded to embassy status, Turkey's first in sub-Saharan Africa. In 1933, Ethiopia reciprocated, opening an embassy in Ankara. During the reign of Haile Selassie, relations were good, as both countries were members of the unofficial "alliance of the periphery". The Emperor visited Turkey twice, in 1967 and in 1971, and an Ethiopian consulate-general was opened in Istanbul. Relations soured during the Derg period, however, given difference in posture between the pro-Western Turkish government and the pro-Soviet Ethiopian government, and in 1984 Ethiopia closed its diplomatic missions in Turkey.

Relations improved in the 1990s and early 2000s, and on 21 April 2006 Ethiopia re-opened its embassy in Ankara. The relations between the two countries have been described as excellent, both politically and economically.

Numerous Ministers of the Ethiopian government have made formal visits to Turkey, while Undersecretaries of the Turkish Ministry of Foreign Affairs and the Turkish Director General for Security, Dr. Turan Genc have likewise visited Ethiopia.

In December 2008, Turkey sent a trade delegation to Ethiopia, which met with the Prime Minister, the Minister of Trade and Industry Girma Biru, and the President of the Oromia Region Abadula Gemeda, as well as visited Turkish-owned textiles factories in Ethiopia. A senior official of the Ministry of Foreign Affairs, who attended the discussion, expressed the hope that Turkey could share its experience and provide assistance to ongoing efforts to rehabilitate and extend its railway system. However, there are also two Ethiopian-Turkish athletes: Elvan Abeylegesse and Alemitu Bekele.

On 18 August 2021, Ethiopian Prime Minister Abiy Ahmed met Turkish President Recep Tayyip Erdoğan in Ankara to sign military agreements, amid reports that Turkish drones being constructed in Addis Ababa. Reports emerged stating Ethiopia purchased the Bayraktar-TB2 and the ANKA-S drones from Turkey. In the meantime, Ethiopian government closed all schools run by the Gülen movement by 11 August.

== Economic relations ==
Bilateral trade between the two countries grew from $200m to reach $650m by 2021. Meanwhile, Turkish investments in Ethiopia reached $2.5b, ranking second only to China.

Currently, there are direct flights between Istanbul and Addis Ababa with Ethiopian Airlines and Turkish Airlines.

== See also ==
- Foreign relations of Ethiopia
- Foreign relations of Turkey
