= Ethiopia–Somaliland relations =

- Somaliland: Ethiopia

Ethiopia–Somaliland relations (Somali: Xiriirka Itoobiya iyo Somaliland) are the relations between the Republic of Somaliland and the Federal Democratic Republic of Ethiopia. Ethiopia has a consulate in Hargeisa and Somaliland has a representative office in Addis Ababa.

== History ==
=== Antiquity and Early modern period ===
Relations between Ethiopia and what now constitutes Somaliland date back at least to the period of Ifat Sultanate and Ethiopian Empire, with Amda Seyon I's conquest of the former. The relationship between Amde Tsion and Ifat's successors in the region was often tense, culminating in the 16th century with the inconclusive Ethiopian–Adal War.

The Ethiopian Empire signed a number of treaties with the British government during the period of the British Mandate over Somaliland. The most famous of these treaties is the Anglo-Ethiopian Treaty of 1897, which was aimed at demarcating the border between Ethiopia and Somaliland. The agreement also established the freedom of trade and movement between the two sides.

=== Modern period ===
Following its establishment in 1982, the Somali National Movement decided to ally with the communist Derg regime in Ethiopia against the forces of the Somali dictator Siad Barre. Relations between the Republic of Somaliland and Ethiopia have generally been positive since Somaliland declared independence on May 18, 1991. The state of affairs marks a departure from the historical animosity between Somalia and Ethiopia.

In 1994, Ethiopia and Somaliland reached security and trade agreements that provided for an expanded strategic partnership. Among the most important of the agreements was a treaty providing for non-formal diplomatic relations between the two countries. Ethiopia and Somaliland also signed an extradition treaty.

On 1 January 2024, Ethiopia and Somaliland signed a memorandum of understanding giving Ethiopia access to the Red Sea via the port of Berbera in return for recognizing Somaliland.

== See also ==
- Foreign relations of Somaliland
- Foreign relations of Ethiopia
- Ethiopia–Somalia relations
