= Ethiopia–France relations =

- Ethiopia: France

Ethiopia–France relations are the international relations between Ethiopia and France. Before World War II, France competed for influence over Ethiopia against the British and the Italians.

== History ==
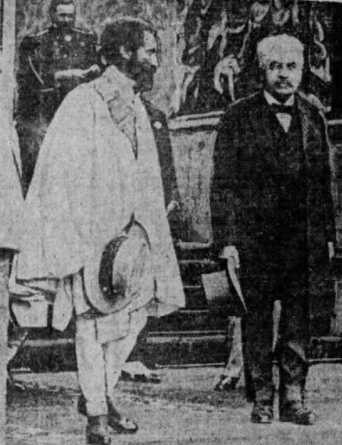
Emperor Haile Selassie and President Alexandre Millerand

In 1883, the French arrived in modern-day Djibouti and established a protectorate. The border between the French colony and Ethiopia would not be formalized until 1897.

In 1902, Emperor Menelik II attended the coronation of Edward VII as the king of the United Kingdom and during his travel stayed in Paris, France where the government welcomed him.

On 13 December 1906, the British, French, and Italians signed a Tripartite Treaty regarding economic activities in Ethiopia and also regulated the sale of weapons to the Ethiopians, which had before lacked any, with patrols in the Red Sea to enforce the weapon regulations. In 1920, the French attempted to have the weapons embargo lifted, but the Italians and British refused although the French would smuggle outdated weaponry through French Somaliland. In 1930, the three countries signed another treaty regulating the sale of military equipment to Ethiopia.

In 1907, Emperor Menelik II gave France its largest embassy in the world with 106 acres. In 1917, a railroad was built between Djibouti and Addis Ababa.

During World War I, the Ethiopian Empire remained neutral, but made attempts to side with the Entente Powers which were stopped by the Italians. In 1918, French Prime Minister Georges Clemenceau asked Italian Prime Minister Vittorio Emanuele Orlando on Selassie's behalf over the acceptance of 2,000 Ethiopian soldiers to fight in the war, but Orlando rejected the offer.

On 28 September 1923, Ethiopia was accepted into the League of Nations. Prince Regent Haile Selassie toured Europe, including France, to thank them for his country's inclusion and to learn about ways to modernize Ethiopia. On 16 April 1924, Selassie and thirty nine people left Addis Ababa by train and arrived in Marseilles, France on 14 May. Two days later he arrived in Paris where he was met by President Alexandre Millerand and Prime Minister Raymond Poincaré. During his tour in France he watched military training exercises in Versailles and gave medals to two tank crew members.

== Modern relations ==
In 2019, President Emmanuel Macron visited Ethiopia after plans for the French to send €100 million (ብር3,620,759,025.00) in economic aid to Ethiopia was made.

All imports from Ethiopia to France are duty-free and quota-free, with the exception of armaments, as part of the Everything but Arms initiative of the European Union.

== See also ==
- Foreign relations of Ethiopia
- Foreign relations of France
