= Ethiopia–South Korea relations =

- Ethiopia: South Korea

Diplomatic mission
- Embassy of Korea, Addis Ababa: Embassy of Ethiopia, Seoul

Ethiopia and South Korea established diplomatic relations on December 23, 1963.

== History ==
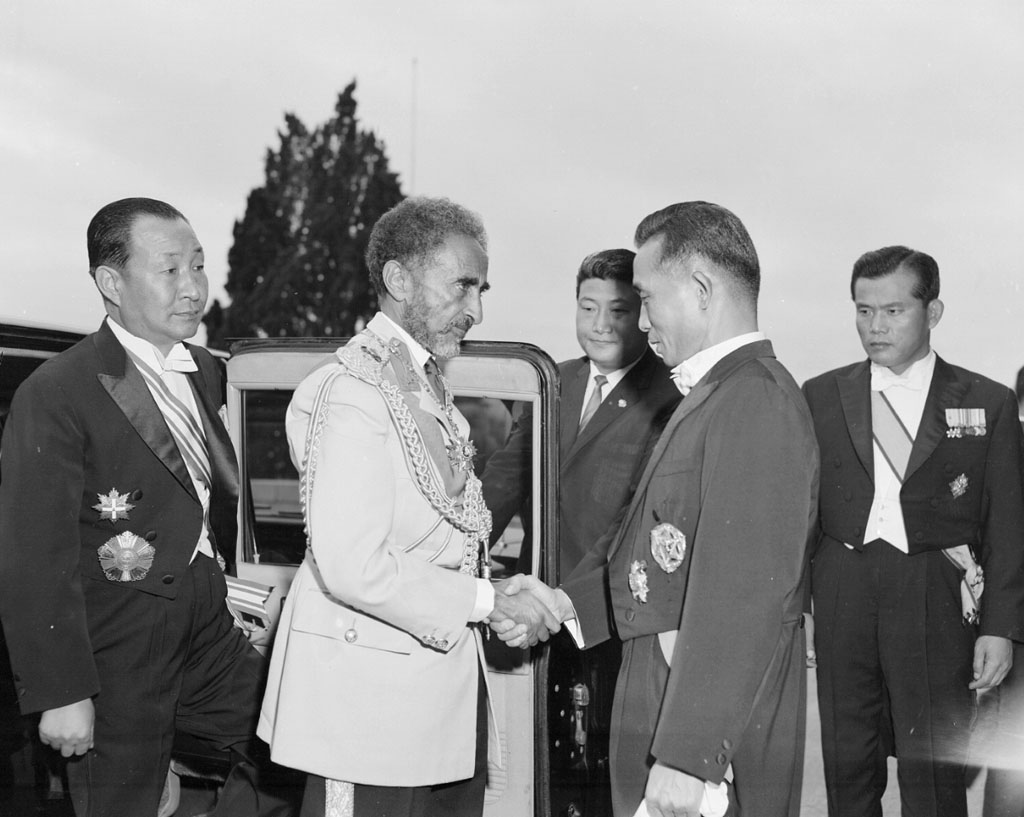
South Korean president Park Chung-hee meeting Haile Selassie I of Ethiopia in Seoul in 1968

The first encounter that two countries shared was the Korean war. Ethiopia, despite having no prior relation with South Korea before the Korean war, decided to send their elite troops to help them. After the Korean war, their initial relations began. During the time Mengistu Haile Mariam was in the charge of Ethiopia, bilateral relations between two countries were in tensions as Ethiopia and North Korea's relation was improved, making Mengistu to visit Pyongyang in 1982. However, the relation between Ethiopia and South Korea was soon improved as Mengistu stepped down from his power.

In 2018, a direct flight opened between South Korea's port city of Incheon and Addis Ababa.

== Diaspora ==
According to a 2019 article, around 1,000 Ethiopians lived in South Korea. Around 400 studied in the country on various scholarships.

== Korean War ==
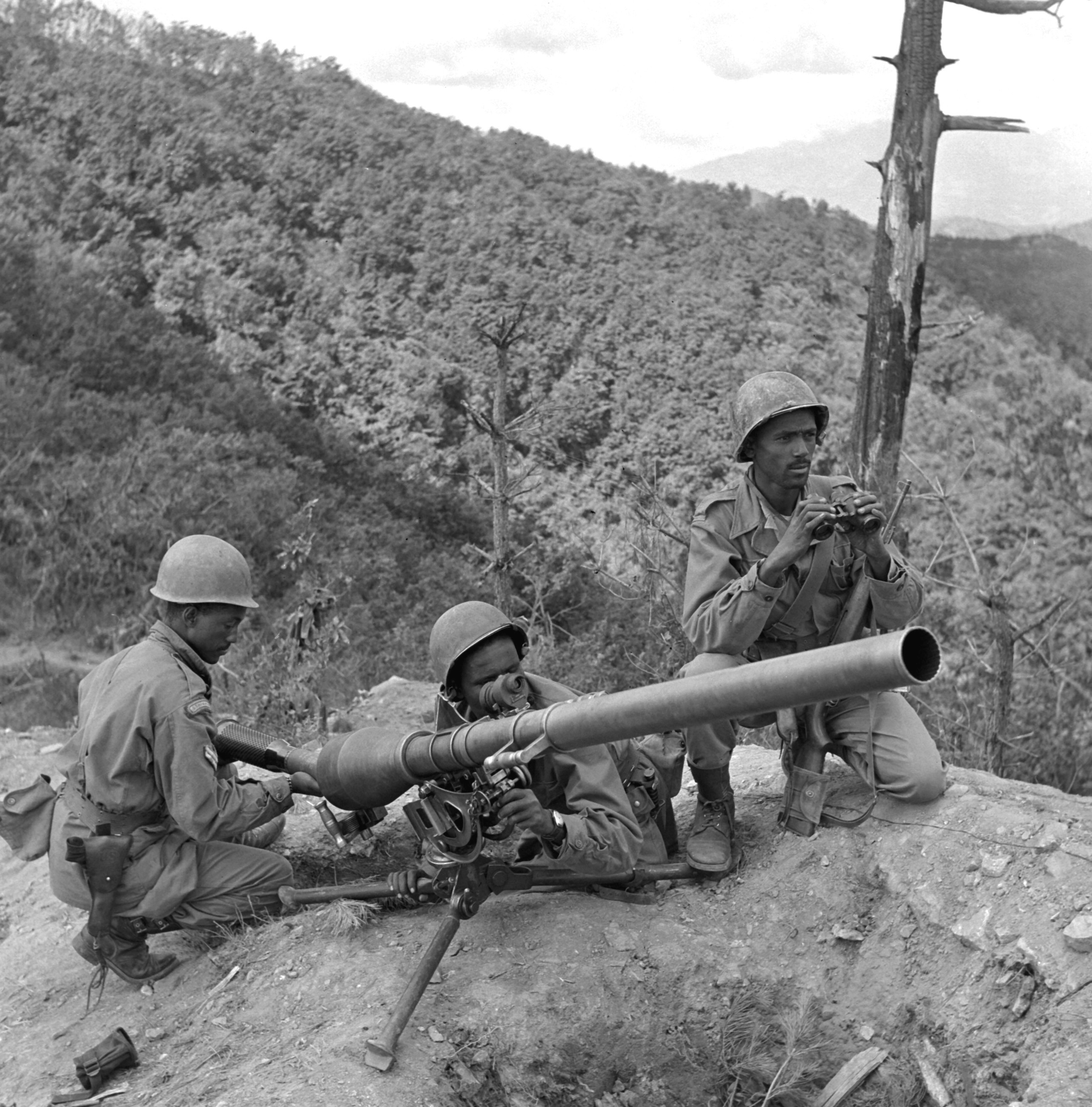
Ethiopian soldiers during Korea war(1951)

Ethiopia was part of the United Nations Command that came to South Korea's aid during the 1950–1953 Korean War. It sent an infantry battalion consisting of 6,037 soldiers. Ethiopian Emperor Haile Selassie sent his elite Kagnew Battalion to the country. They reportedly took place in 253 battles and were never defeated, with 121 deaths and 500 injuries. None were captured. Ethiopian soldiers remained in South Korea after the 1953 ceasefire to assist in the country's rebuilding.

Various monuments in South Korea commemorate Ethiopia's assistance to South Korea during the war, including the War Memorial of Korea in Seoul. A monument to the Korean War soldiers was erected in Addis Ababa.

The city of Chuncheon has since become tied with Ethiopia, and a number of monuments exist to the country and its role in the Korean War. In May 1968, Chuncheon erected a monument dedicated to the sacrifices of the Kagnew Battalion. Haile Selassie was present at its unveiling. An Ethiopia-gil (Korean: 에티오피아 길, Ethiopia Road) is also present in Chuncheon. In 2007, the Memorial Hall for Ethiopian Veterans in the Korean War was opened in Chuncheon. It has two floors, with the first floor highlighting Ethiopia's role in the war, and the second highlighting Ethiopia's culture.

Korean companies such as LG Electronics are conducting Corporate social responsibility actions, helping Ethiopian veterans who fought for South Korea. In Aid sector, related organizations such as Korea International Cooperation Agency is cooperating with Ethiopian organizations in areas such as climate change, education, and infrastructure.

In 2025, around 60 Korean war veterans in Ethiopia are alive.

== Diplomatic missions ==
- South Korea has had an embassy in Ethiopia's capital Addis Ababa since 1965. This embassy also functions as a permanent mission of the republic of Korea to the African Union.
- Ethiopia also has an embassy in South Korea's capital Seoul.

== See also ==
- Foreign relations of Ethiopia
- Foreign relations of South Korea
- Kagnew Battalion
