= Ethiopia–Finland relations =

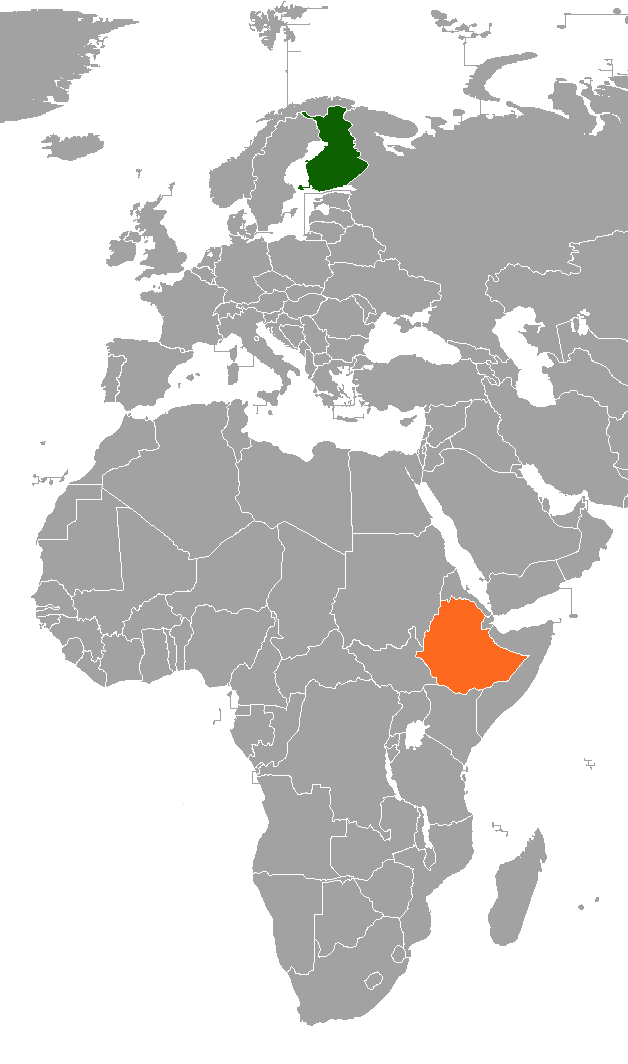

- Finland: Ethiopia

Ethiopia–Finland relations are foreign relations between the Finland and Ethiopia. Both countries established diplomatic relations on July 17, 1959. Ethiopia is represented in Finland through its embassy in Stockholm, Sweden. Finland has an embassy in Addis Ababa.

== History ==
The Ethiopian Ministry of Foreign Affairs traces the relationship between the two countries to the 1950s when Finnish missionaries first came to Ethiopia. In March 1984, the two countries signed a Memorandum on Development Cooperation. In 2003, the Finnish Foreign Minister, Erkki Tuomioja, visited Ethiopia.

President of the Republic of Finland, Sauli Niinistö, made an official visit to Ethiopia on 15–16 October 2019. This was the first presidential visit between Finland and Ethiopia, and President Niinistö’s first official visit to Africa.

== Finnish assistance ==
Ethiopia is one of Finland's long-term partners in economic development and in the water and education sectors. Finland began bilateral development cooperation with Ethiopia in 1967. Development cooperation was suspended during the Ethiopian Civil War in 1991–93, and again in 1998–2000 during the Eritrean-Ethiopian War. Finland, like other donors, did not make any new cooperation commitments in 2005 as a result of the violence following the parliamentary elections, but did resume cooperation at the previous level in 2007.

On 29 April 2009, the Ministry of Finance and Economic Development announced that the Finnish government had made a grant of €11.4 million to enable the Benishangul-Gumuz Region upgrade its capacity of planning and managing its rural water supply and sanitation program to achieve universal access for all Ethiopians. On 28 July 2009, the Finnish Ambassador, Kirsti Aarnio, praised Ethiopia's effort to pull itself out of poverty by achieving successive economic growth. She described their trade as Finland importing coffee, spices and leather from Ethiopia, while Ethiopia buys in various high-tech products from Finland. She also stated that ample opportunities existed where the two sides can boost cooperation in the areas of environment, information technology, telecommunication services and energy.

== Trade ==
All imports from Ethiopia to Finland are duty-free and quota-free, with the exception of armaments, as part of the Everything but Arms initiative of the European Union.

== Resident diplomatic missions ==
- Ethiopia is accredited to Finland from its embassy in Stockholm, Sweden.
- Finland has an embassy in Addis Ababa.

== See also ==
- Foreign relations of Ethiopia
- Foreign relations of Finland
