= Ethiopia–South Africa relations =

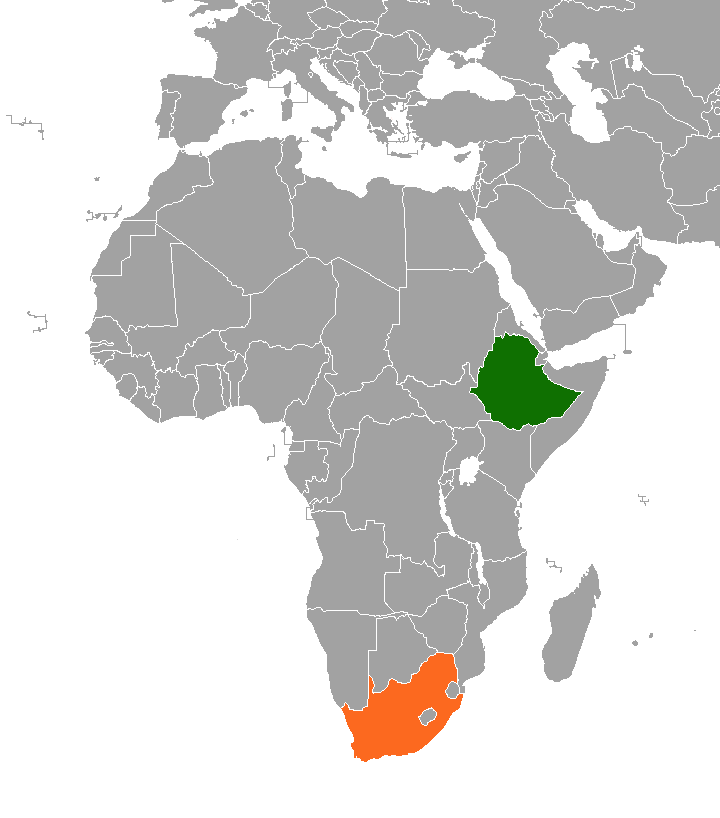

- Ethiopia: South Africa

Ethiopia–South Africa relations refers to the current and historical relationship between Ethiopia and South Africa. Ethiopia was a fierce opponent of apartheid South Africa. After the democratic elections of 1994, the two countries established official bilateral relations for the first time. Both countries are members of the African Union and the Group of 77.

In 1962, future South African President Nelson Mandela delivered his first international speech to African leaders assembled in Addis Ababa. Ethiopian military leaders also provided essential training to Mandela, which helped launch Umkhonto we Sizwe, which was the paramilitary wing of the African National Congress.

Ethiopia has an embassy in Pretoria and South Africa has an embassy in Addis Ababa.

== Economic ==
In March 1998, the countries signed a declaration of intent regarding trade. Between 1998 and 2017, Ethiopia licensed 58 South African companies to invest in the country. In 2018, the countries announced plans to further increase economic relations. In January 2020, the leaders agreed to strengthen relations.

== Resident diplomatic missions ==
- Ethiopia has an embassy in Pretoria.
- South Africa has an embassy in Addis Ababa.

== See also ==
- Foreign relations of Ethiopia
- Foreign relations of South Africa
