= Ethiopia–Indonesia relations =

- Ethiopia: Indonesia

Ethiopia and Indonesia established diplomatic relations on 20 June 1961, followed by the opening of an Indonesian embassy in Addis Ababa in 1964, also accredited to Djibouti, Eritrea, and the African Union. Ethiopia established an embassy in Jakarta in the second half of 2016. Arega Hailu Teffera, Ambassador Extraordinary and Plenipotentiary of the Federal Democratic Republic of Ethiopia to Indonesia presented his credentials to President Joko Widodo on 23 February 2017. The Embassy of Ethiopia in Jakarta is accredited to ASEAN HQ, Brunei, Malaysia, the Maldives, Singapore and Timor-Leste. Both nations are members of the Non-Aligned Movement, the Group of 77 and BRICS.

The Indonesian embassy in Addis Ababa has identified two main obstacles that hamper trade relations between the two nations; the geographic location of Ethiopia as a landlocked country and the armed conflicts around Ethiopia. Through the Non-Aligned Movement Center for South-South Technical Cooperation, Indonesia has assisted numerous Ethiopian public officials through education and training in Indonesia encompassing various sectors; such as agriculture, education, family planning, micro-enterprise management, environment, poverty reduction, health improvement and higher education opportunities.

== Trade and investment ==
Although today the trade volume is relatively small, the trade between Ethiopia and Indonesia will potentially increase as Indonesia sees Ethiopia as a new African market for Indonesian products, such as soap and instant noodles. In 2007 the bilateral trade volume stood around US$69 million, balanced heavily in favour of Indonesia. Ethiopian imports from Indonesia are electronics, soap and detergent, paper and books, tire, textile and furniture.

== See also ==
- Foreign relations of Ethiopia
- Foreign relations of Indonesia
