= Ethiopia–Qatar relations =

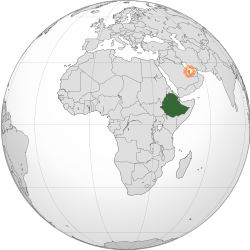

- Ethiopia: Qatar

Ethiopia–Qatar relations are foreign relations between Ethiopia and Qatar.

== Relations ==
Ethiopia abruptly broke diplomatic ties with Qatar in April 2008, accusing "the output of its media outlets" of "direct and indirect assistance to terrorist organizations," according to an Ethiopian Foreign Ministry statement. The statement further alleged that "Qatar has left no stone unturned to cause harm to Ethiopia's national security". In an interview with Committee to Protect Journalists that November, Foreign Ministry spokesman Wahid Belay said the statement referred to the Al-Jazeera news channel based in Qatar, which had aired a critical series on the plight of civilians in the Ogaden, a part of the Somali Region. The Qatar Foreign Ministry responded with a statement in which they "expressed surprise" at Ethiopia's actions, denying the accusations, and "called on the Ethiopian Government to refrain from involving the State of Qatar in its rifts, recalling that the Ethiopian Government has previously made similar claims but the State of Qatar preferred not to reply out of the hope that the Ethiopian Government would stop such wrong behaviours."

In 2018, Samia Zekaria was appointed Ambassador of Ethiopia to Qatar.

== Agreements ==
In 2005, the countries signed a technical and economic cooperation agreement.

== Resident diplomatic missions ==
- Ethiopia has an embassy in Doha.
- Qatar has an embassy in Addis Ababa.

== See also ==
- Foreign relations of Ethiopia
- Foreign relations of Qatar
