= Ethiopia–Malaysia relations =

- Ethiopia: Malaysia

Ethiopia–Malaysia relations are foreign relations between Ethiopia and Malaysia. Ethiopia has a consulate-general in Kuala Lumpur, while Malaysia has no embassy in Ethiopia. Both countries are members of the Group of 77.

== History ==
The Ethiopian general-consulate in Kuala Lumpur was established in 2003, with the main purpose of the consulate being to enhance trade and economic activities between the two countries and for closer person-to-person contact. In 2025 the Embassy of Malaysia reopened after a closure that lasted more than 40 years, coinciding with Prime Minister of Malaysia Anwar Ibrahim official visit to Ethiopia to reaffirmed diplomatic ties between the two countries.

== Economic relations ==
Malaysia is one of the major trade partners of Ethiopia. In 2005, Ethiopia's Ministry of Mines and Petronas, a Malaysian oil firm, signed a four-year exploration and production agreement enabling the latter to explore and produce petroleum in Ethiopia. In 2009, a Malaysian company set up a mushroom farming establishment with an investment of Br285 million. The area covers a 60 hectare mushroom farm near Lake Shala where the main production facility lies. In 2013, a Malaysian edible oil producer built a large food oil refinery in Ethiopia. Both countries are also working on air transport and Malaysia Airlines has established a codeshare agreement with Ethiopian Airlines.
