= Ethiopia–Jamaica relations =

Bilateral relations

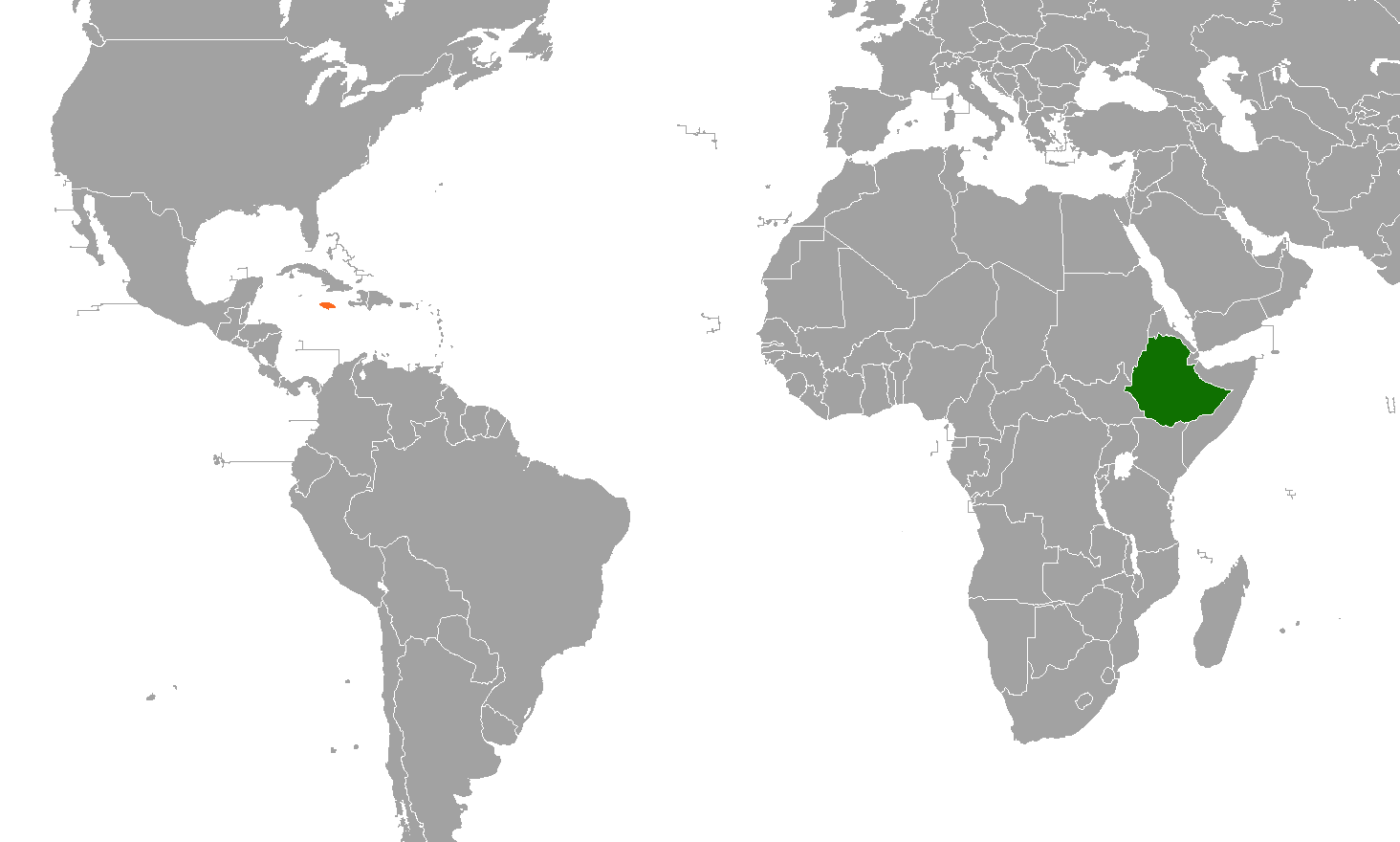

- Ethiopia: Jamaica

Diplomatic mission
- Embassy of Ethiopia in Havana, Cuba: High Commission of Jamaica in Pretoria, South Africa

Ethiopia-Jamaica relations are the bilateral relations between Jamaica and Ethiopia.

== Origins ==
In 1948, the Shashamane Land Grant by Emperor Haile Selassie I to members of the Ethiopian World Federation led to a large Jamaican settlement in the village of Shashamane, earning it the nickname "Little Jamaica".

== Haile Selassie's first visit ==
Haile Selassie visited Jamaica on Thursday, April 21, 1966. He was greeted at the airport with crowds playing drums and smoking large quantities of marijuana. He was driven to the King's House to take up residence as the guest of Jamaican Prime Minister Donald Sangster and Governor-General Clifford Campbell. He later addressed the Parliament of Jamaica, received the Key to the City of Spanish Town by Commissioner Eustice Bird, and visited Jamaica College. During the visit, Rastafari representatives were present at all state functions attended by His Majesty. The visit drew crowds of some 100,000 Rastafari who descended on Kingston's Palisadoes Airport. Today the Rastafari celebrate April 21 as Grounation Day.

== Revival of relations ==
On 13 June 2016, Ethiopian foreign Minister Tedros Adhanom paid an official visit to Jamaica, the first by an Ethiopian official in 50 years.

== Diplomatic missions ==
Neither country has a resident ambassador.

- Ethiopia is accredited to Jamaica from its embassy in Havana, Cuba and maintains an honorary consulate in Kingston.
- Jamaica is accredited to Ethiopia from its high commission in Pretoria, South Africa and maintains an honorary consulate in Addis Ababa.
