= Brazil–Ethiopia relations =

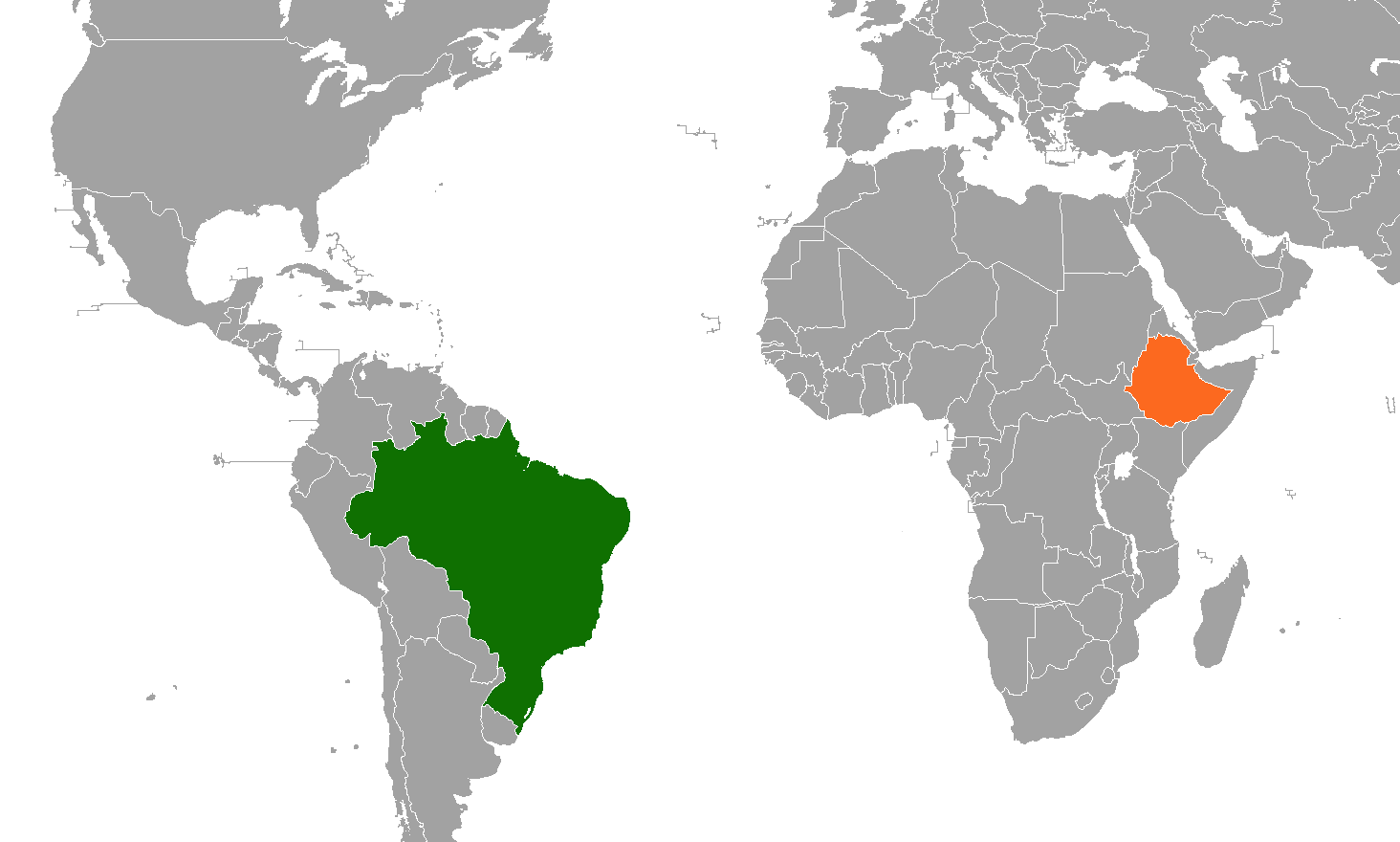

- Brazil: Ethiopia

Brazil–Ethiopia relations are the current and historical relations between Brazil and Ethiopia. Both nations are members of the Group of 77, BRICS and the United Nations.

== History ==
In 1951, Brazil and Ethiopia established diplomatic relations. In 1960, Brazil opened a resident embassy in Addis Ababa. In December 1960, Ethiopian Emperor Haile Selassie paid an official visit to Brazil. During his visit, Emperor Selassie met with Brazilian President Juscelino Kubitschek and visited the National Congress of Brazil. The Emperor's visit was cut short after four days as he had to return to Ethiopia to attend to an unsuccessful coup d'état attempt. A few years after the Emperor's visit, Brazil closed its embassy in Addis Ababa.

In 2005, Brazil was granted Permanent Observer status at the African Union (headquartered in Ethiopia). That same year, Brazil re-opened its embassy in Addis Ababa. In 2011, Ethiopia opened an embassy in Brasília. In June 2012, Ethiopian Prime Minister Meles Zenawi traveled to Rio de Janeiro to attend the United Nations Conference on Sustainable Development (Rio+20). In May 2013, Brazilian President Dilma Rousseff traveled to Ethiopia to attend the African Union's 50th anniversary celebrations where she met with Ethiopian Prime Minister Hailemariam Desalegn.

The exchange of high-level visits between Brazil and Ethiopia has been frequent, which has contributed to the intensification of bilateral dialogue and cooperation in areas such as agriculture, renewable energies, science and technology, education and social development. In April 2018, the First Meeting of Bilateral Political Consultations was held in Addis Ababa. As part of the existing partnership between Embrapa and the Ethiopian Agricultural Research Institute (EIAR), Brazil and Ethiopia maintain technical cooperation projects in the areas of sustainable forest management and acid soil management. The two countries are also involved in cooperation projects in the areas of basic sanitation and population census.

In 2021, Ethiopia closed its embassy in Brazil due to financial constraints brought by the Tigray War. In May 2022, Ethiopia re-opened its embassy in Brasília and appointed a new resident Ambassador. In February 2024, Brazilian President Luiz Inácio Lula da Silva paid a visit to Ethiopia.

== High-level visits ==
High-level visits from Brazil to Ethiopia

- Foreign Minister Celso Amorim (2005)
- Foreign Minister Antonio Patriota (2012)
- President Dilma Rousseff (2013)
- Foreign Minister Mauro Vieira (2016)
- President Luiz Inácio Lula da Silva (2024)

High-level visits from Ethiopia to Brazil

- Emperor Haile Selassie (1960)
- Prime Minister Meles Zenawi (2012)
- Finance Minister Sufian Ahmed (2012)
- Deputy Prime Minister Demeke Mekonnen (2014)
- Minister of Agriculture Eyasu Abraha Alle (2017)

== Bilateral agreements ==
Both nations have signed several agreements such as an Agreement on bilateral technical cooperation (2012); Memorandum of Understanding for the establishment of a political consultation mechanism (2012); Memorandum of Understanding of Agricultural Cooperation (2013); Agreement on Science, Technology and Innovation Cooperation (2013); Agreement on Educational Cooperation (2013); Air Service Agreement (2013); Agreement to Avoid Double Taxation of Profits from International Air and Maritime Transport (2015) and a Memorandum of Understanding for the Promotion of Trade and Investments (2018).

== Transportation ==
There are flights between Addis Ababa and São Paulo with Ethiopian Airlines.

== Resident diplomatic missions ==
Of Brazil

- Addis Ababa (Embassy)

Of Ethiopia

- Brasília (Embassy)

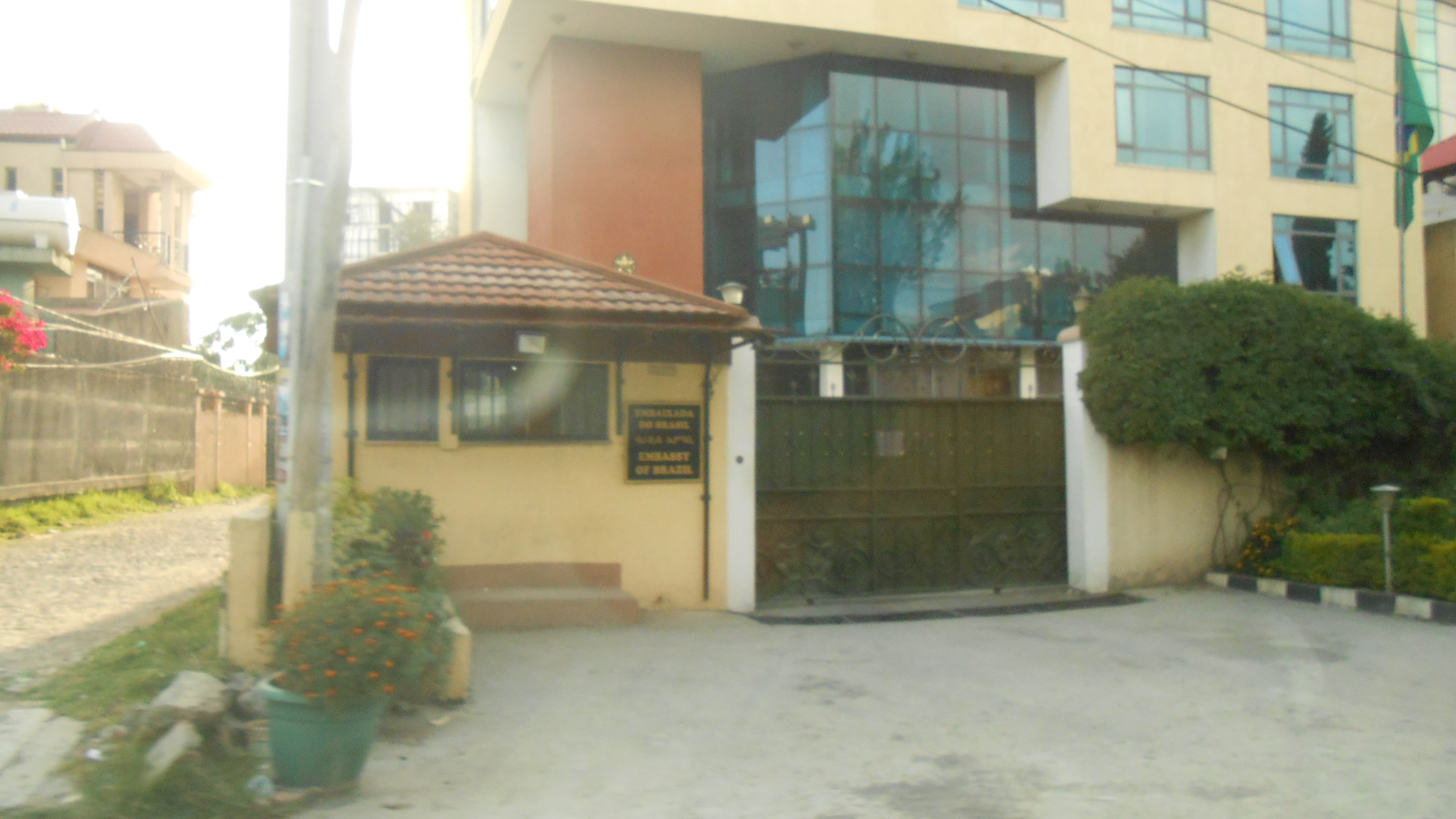
Embassy of Brazil in Addis Ababa
