= Ethiopia–South Sudan relations =

Bilateral relations

- Ethiopia: South Sudan

Diplomatic mission
- Embassy of South Sudan in Addis Ababa: Embassy in South Sudan in Juba

Envoy
- Ambassador Nabil Mahdi: Ambassador Natalina Edward Mou

Ethiopia–South Sudan relations are bilateral relations between Ethiopia and South Sudan. Both countries enjoyed historic, cultural and anthropogeographical relations.

During the First Sudanese Civil War, Ethiopia supported the Southern Sudanese faction Sudan People's Liberation Movement/Army (SPLM/A) with arms to deter Sudanese government. Nevertheless, Ethiopia mediated the North and South Sudanese officials in the 1972 Addis Ababa Agreement.

Since its independence in 2011, South Sudan has had favorable bilateral relations with Ethiopia to discuss regional peace. However, borderland ethnic skirmishes in Gambela Region since the early 2000s have challenged their development.

== History ==
Since its independence from Sudan in 2011, South Sudan relations with Ethiopia has been described historical, cultural and anthropogeographical affinity since prehistoric times. Beside, both countries government have met borderland conflicts and ethnic skirmishes; for instance, during the First Sudanese Civil War in 1960 and 1970s, the Ethiopian government supported the Southern Sudanese faction Sudan People's Liberation Movement/Army (SPLM/A) with arms, against Sudanese government.

In 1972, the Addis Ababa Agreement was negotiated by Emperor Haile Selassie signed by the Southern Sudan Liberation Movement founder Ezboni Mondiri and Sudanese vice-president Abel Alier.

Gambela Region, which is situated between the border of South Sudan and Ethiopia, has been the source of ethnic clashes between Anuak and Nuer ethnic groups, with auxiliary conflict between the Oromo Liberation Army (OLA) and Gambela People's Liberation Movement (GPLF). Causes of the conflict arise from competition over resources, political marginalization, corruption, and historical ethnic divisions, leading to large flux of South Sudanese refugee in Gambela region.

== See also ==
- Gambela conflict
