= Alemayehu Tegenu =

Ethiopian politician

- Born: 1963 (age 62–63); Ethiopia
- Education: Tashkent Institute of Irrigation and Agricultural Mechanization Engineers

Alemayehu Tegenu (Amharic: ዓለማየሁ ተገኑ) is an Ethiopian politician who was Ambassador to Russia from 2019 to 2023. He was also the Ethiopian Minister of Water, Irrigation and Energy. He served as head of the Office of the Prime Minister of Ethiopia from 2015 to 2018.

== Early life and education ==
Born in Ethiopia in 1963. Tegenu graduated from the Tashkent Institute of Irrigation and Agricultural Mechanization Engineers in 1991.

== See also ==
- Energy in Ethiopia
