= Cuba–Ethiopia relations =

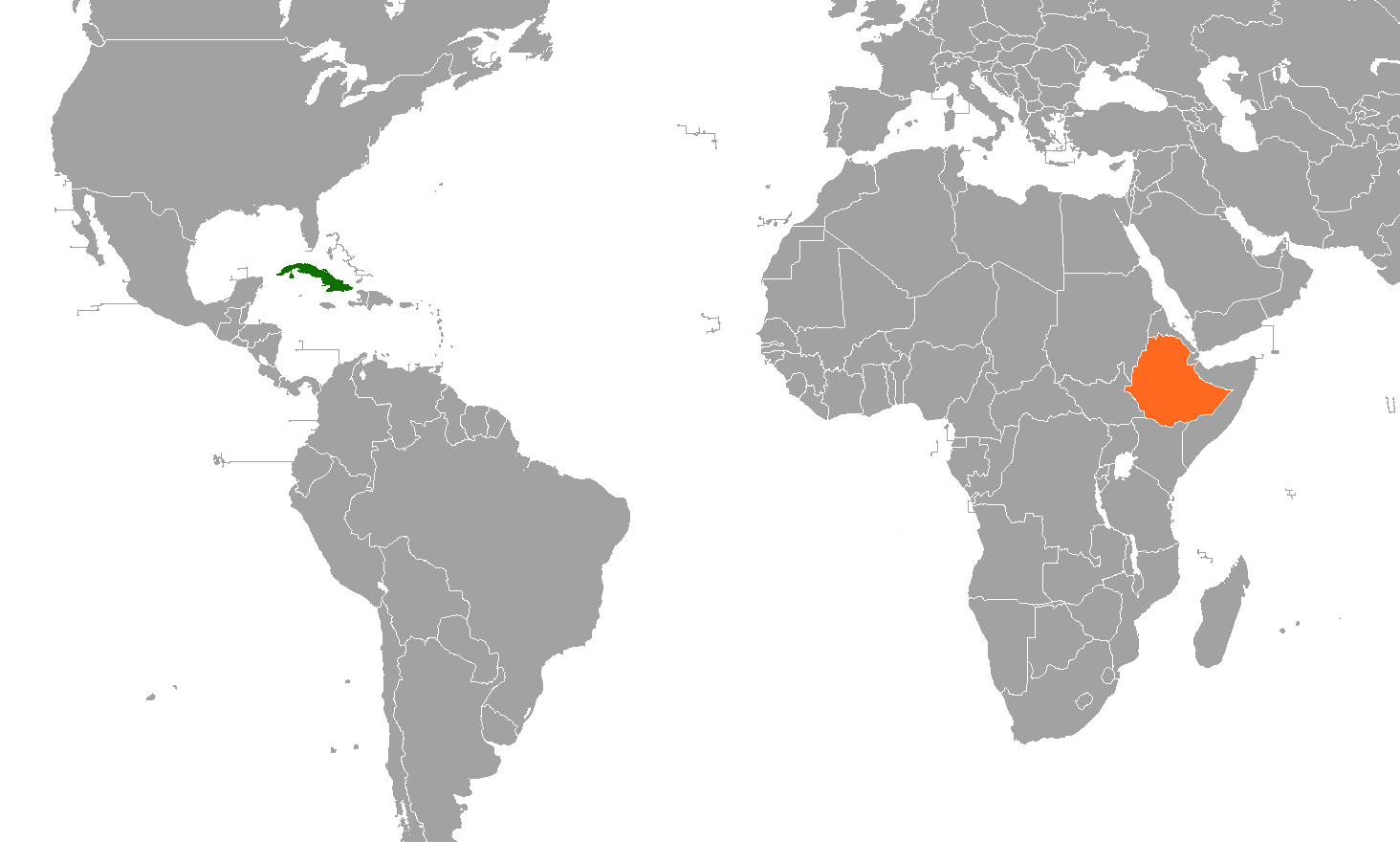

- Cuba: Ethiopia

Cuba–Ethiopia relations refers to the bilateral relations between Cuba and Ethiopia. Both nations are members of the Non-Aligned Movement and the United Nations.

== History ==
The interactions between Cuba and Ethiopia commenced in the year 1974 during the revolution that perspired in Ethiopia. During the years prior to the international ties, Foreign policies were focused on reinforcing International Socialist Solidarity and supporting any liberation movements occurring in Africa. Once Ethiopia was deemed a socialist country, unions began to increase and so did the attacks against Ethiopia such as the Tigray rebel groups since they were deemed to be a weakened country. Soon after the Derg obtained power in Ethiopia, abolished the monarchy and embraced communism as an ideology. The Ethiopian Provisional Military Government and Cuba soon established close political relations. In August 1976, both nations opened resident embassies.

=== Context ===
In 1977, Somalia threatened to invade the Ogaden region of Ethiopia, with the plan to unify the Somali-inhabited territories of Ethiopia with Somalia. The Western part of Ethiopia began to threaten Ethiopia, making it one of the most crucial motivators for the training of rebels. As war seemed likely between the two nations, Cuban President Fidel Castro paid a visit to both Ethiopia and Somalia in March 1977 to ease tensions between both nations and brought together the leaders of Somalia, Ethiopia and South Yemen and proposed for them to unify and create a greater socialist federal states in the region. However, it was to no avail. Four months later, in July 1977, the Ogaden War began when Somalia invaded Ethiopia. Cuba sent over 16,000 soldiers and with the help of the Soviet Union, established an Ethiopian victory in 1978.

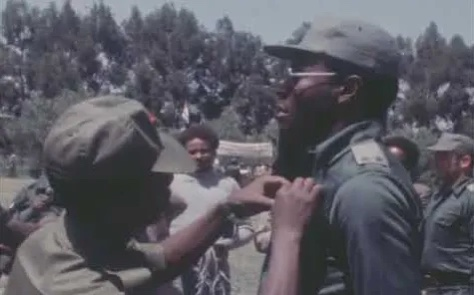
Ethiopian dictator Mengistu Haile Mariam awards Cuban soldiers for their participation in Ogaden War.

Fidel Castro felt that the Somali government had turned its back on socialist ideology and decided to support Ethiopia in the war. Soon after the start of the war, Cuba sent over 15,000 soldiers to the Ogaden region. Although, the regime gained mass armed forces they preferred to stand ground alongside farmers yet they were not trained enough to combat the aggressors. Their presence, along with Soviet troops and equipment, led to an Ethiopian victory in the war in 1978. In 1989, Ethiopia and Somalia signed a deal recognizing each other's territorial limits and the last Cuban soldiers withdrew from the region, some twelve years after they first arrived. In 1984, the Tiglachin Monument was inaugurated as a memorial in Addis Ababa to the Ethiopian and Cuban soldiers involved in the Ogaden War.

Since the end of Cuban military involvement in Ethiopia; relations between nations have remained close. The Cuban government has maintained annually an allocation of scholarships to Ethiopian students to study in Cuba, in different specialties. More than 5,000 Ethiopian students have graduated from Cuban universities since the 1970s. Each year, the Cuban government also sends doctors to assist in providing services in health institutions in Addis Ababa and Jimma.

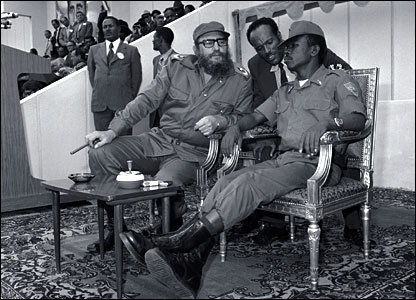
Mengistu and Castro on the military parade in Ethiopia.

Throughout the years, there have been numerous visits between leaders of both nations. In January 2018, Ethiopian President Mulatu Teshome paid a visit to Cuba. In May 2019, Cuban Vice-President Salvador Valdés Mesa paid a visit to Ethiopia. In 2020, both nations celebrated 45 years of diplomatic relations.

=== The Soviet Union and Cuba in Ethiopia ===
A treaty was signed between the Soviet Union and Ethiopia starting a friendship in regards to economic, political and military connections in the year of 1978. These interactions were brought together due to the parallels between Cuba and Ethiopia. There was a constant reliance of weaponry from the Cubans and personals from the Union which initiated the constant question of policies.

== Resident diplomatic missions ==
- Cuba has an embassy in Addis Ababa.
- Ethiopia has an embassy in Havana.

== See also ==
- Eritrean War of Independence
- Ethiopian Civil War
