= Ethiopia–European Union relations =

Bilateral relations

- Ethiopia: European Union

Envoy
- Ambassador Redwan Hussein: Ambassador Roland Kobia

Relations between the European Union and Ethiopia is the largest with EU funding is financed by the European Development Fund (EDF) with objectives of increasing resilience. It is defined by Cotonou Agreement article 8 to 13 with strong bilateral partners and dialogue regarding sustainable development on diverse aspect of the country.

On 14 June 2016, Prime Minister Hailemariam Desalegn signed Joint Declaration towards Strategic Engagement of both relations with EU Commissioner Jean-Claude Juncker which has six sectorial dialogues: Governance and Human Rights; Regional Peace and Security; Countering Terrorism and Violent Radicalism; Migration; Social and Economic Development, Investment and Trade; and Climate Change and Environmental Cooperation.

The EU is the second most trade partner with Ethiopia with total expenditure of 4.1 billion euro in 2016. Ethiopian exports represented 26% of worldwide exports followed by Somalia, Kuwait, and China while import from the EU was 12% behind China, India and Kuwait.

== Political relations ==
Majority of the European Union funding in Ethiopia is financed by the European Development Fund (EDF) with objectives of increasing resilience, accompanied by reforms and promoting sustained agriculture and economic growth. In total, the EU's development assistance for Ethiopia has averaged an estimated €214 million per year.

From 2014 to 2020, the European Union priorities in Ethiopia are: to support Ethiopia's immediate stability and peace by means of dialogue and by providing technical and financial support to the political reform programs and to inclusive governance.

Political relations between the EU and Ethiopia are founded on the Cotonou Agreement, its Article 8 to 13 define the bilateral dialogue and partnership as well as commitment. It includes diverse aspect of cooperation, trade, and economic development, consolidation of democratic institutions, regional peace and security and migration. Ethiopia has been one of African countries to be partnership active in regional peace and security as well as on thematic international debates such as climate change.

On 14 June 2016, Prime Minister Hailemariam Desalegn and the European Commission President Jean-Claude Juncker signed a Joint Declaration towards an EU-Ethiopia Strategic Engagement. This commits both sides to annual Ministerial Meeting and six sectorial dialogues: Governance and Human Rights; Regional Peace and Security; Countering Terrorism and Violent Radicalism; Migration; Social and Economic Development, Investment and Trade; and Climate Change and Environmental Cooperation.

== Economic partnership ==
In 2016, the EU the second most important trade partner for Ethiopia with total 4.1 billion euro. Ethiopia exports to the EU represented 26% of worldwide exports in 2016 followed by Somalia (14%), Kuwait (13%) and China (8%) in terms of export destination. Import of Ethiopia consisted of 12% from the EU, behind China (26%), ahead of India (6%) and Kuwait (5%). This has been compared from the year 1992 to 2014 EU investment totaling over 2 billion euro.

The EU created more than 200,000 jobs in Ethiopia with 300 EU active companies active in Ethiopia. In response, Ethiopia recognized high-quality sustainable development notably for technology transfer in key sectors as well as sustainable employment generation. The EU Commission and membership provide 1/3 of ODA to Ethiopia with 1 billion USD per year, and is progressively leading the country's economic system working within EU+ and the wider DAG community on aid effectiveness.

== Immigration of Ethiopian nationals ==
Immigration often cited as lack of livelihood opportunities as the main driver for migration. Other may include fear of political oppression or persecution. In 2015 more than 3,500 identified Ethiopians crossed the EU borders irregularly, representing 175% increase from 2014. Until October 2015, 4,650 Ethiopians applied asylum seekers in the European Union, the acceptance rate was relatively high nearly 50% in the first 3 quarters of 2015. However, UNHCR estimated around 40% to 60% of asylum seekers comes from Somalia and Eritrea than Ethiopia.

To date, Ethiopia has not been cooperative on returns and readmission of irregular migrants from Europe despite receiving large numbers of returns from neighboring and Middle East countries. On 11 November 2015, the CAMM Joint Declaration was signed in the margin of the Valletta Summit on Migration. On 12–13 January 2016, Ethiopian Minister of Foreign Affairs Tedros Adhanom visited Brussels where he discussed migration with Commissioner Dimitris Avramopoulos, and the Prime Minister commitment to implement CAMM and to cooperate on returns.

Norway has a Memorandum of Understanding, which is not being implemented by Ethiopia.

== Ethiopia's foreign relations with EU member states ==
- Austria
- Belgium
- Bulgaria
- Croatia
- Cyprus
- Czech Republic
- Denmark
- Estonia
- Finland
- France
- Germany
- Greece
- Hungary
- (Republic of Ireland) Ireland
- Italy
- Latvia
- Lithuania
- Luxembourg
- Malta
- Netherlands
- Poland
- Portugal
- Romania
- Slovakia
- Slovenia
- Spain
- Sweden
