= List of ambassadors of Spain to Guatemala =

Ambassador of Spain to Guatemala
- Coat of arms of Spain
- Incumbent; María Clara Girbau Ronda since 13 March 2024
- Ministry of Foreign Affairs; Secretariat of State for Ibero-America
- Style: The Most Excellent
- Residence: Guatemala City
- Nominator: The Foreign Minister
- Appointer: The Monarch
- Term length: At the government's pleasure
- Precursor: Ambassador of Spain to Central America
- Inaugural holder: Mariano Vidal Tolosana
- Formation: 1954
- Website: Mission of Spain to Guatemala

The ambassador of Spain to Guatemala is the official representative of the Kingdom of Spain to the Republic of Guatemala. It is also accredited to Belize.

Spain sent is first diplomatic representatives to Central America in the 1850s, with a unique ambassador to the whole region. The ambassador to Central America was responsible for establishing diplomatic relations with the newly formed republics of the region. In the case of Guatemala, the two countries signed a treaty of peace, friendship, and recognition in 1863. The Legation to Central America was located to Guatemala City. Over time, this position gradually lost its responsibilities to new ambassadors and, since 1936, has been exclusively responsible for the Republic of Guatemala.

After the Guatemalan Revolution, both countries broke relations due to the support of the Guatemalan governments to the Spanish Republican government in exile. These were re-established after the 1954 Guatemalan coup d'état, with the first ambassadorial-rank appointment.

Due to the 1980 Spanish embassy burning in Guatemala City, Spain broke relations with Guatemala in February 1980, and were re-established in September 1984, after the public apology from President Óscar Humberto Mejía Víctores and the acknowledgment by the Guatemalan government that the events constituted "a violation of Article 22 of the Vienna Convention on Diplomatic Relations".

== Jurisdiction ==
- Guatemala: Spain has had a diplomatic representation in Guatemala since the 1850s. In 1954 was elevated to the rank of Embassy. The Consular Section of the Embassy provides consular assistance to Spaniards in the country and it also counts with an honorary consulate in Quetzaltenango.

The ambassador is also accredited to:

- Belize: Both nations established diplomatic relations in 1989. In 1993, the ambassador to Guatemala replaced the ambassador to the Organization of American States as the diplomatic representative to the Belizean authorities. Spain has an honorary consulate in Belize City.

In the past, before 1936, this position served as ambassador to Central America, representing Spain to the republics of Costa Rica, El Salvador, Honduras and Nicaragua.

== List of ambassadors to Guatemala (1936–present) ==
This list was compiled using the work "History of the Spanish Diplomacy" by the Spanish historian and diplomat Miguel Ángel Ochoa Brun. The work covers up to the year 2000, so the rest is based on appointments published in the Boletín Oficial del Estado.

Nombre	Rank	Mandato
Rafael Triana y Blasco	Minister	1936–1940
Antonio Sanz Agero	Minister	1940–1945
Federico Gabaldón y Navarro	Minister	1946
Mariano Vidal Tolosana	Ambassador	1954–1960
Ángel Sanz Briz	Ambassador	1960–1962
José Antonio Giménez-Arnau	Ambassador	1962–1964
Emilio Garrigues y Díaz-Cañabate	Ambassador	1964–1967
Santiago Tabanera Ruiz	Ambassador	1967–1969
Justo Bermejo y Gómez	Ambassador	1969–1975
Carlos Manzanares Herrero	Ambassador	1975–1979
Máximo Cajal López	Ambassador	1979–1980
Break of diplomatic relations
José Antonio Bordallo Huidobro	Chargé d'affaires	1984–1985
José Luis Crespo de Vega	Ambassador	1985–1988
Juan Pablo de Laiglesia	Ambassador	1988–1992
Manuel Piñeiro Souto	Ambassador	1992–1997
Víctor Luis Fagilde González	Ambassador	1997–2001
Ramón Gandarias Alonso de Celis	Ambassador	2001–2004
Juan López-Doriga Pérez	Ambassador	2004–2008
María del Carmen Díez Orejas	Ambassador	2008–2011
Manuel María Lejarreta	Ambassador	2011–2015
Alfonso Manuel Portabales Vázquez	Ambassador	2015–2020
José María Laviña Rodríguez	Ambassador	2020–2024
María Clara Girbau Ronda	Ambassador	2024–pres.
