= List of ambassadors of Spain to Honduras =

Ambassador of Spain to Honduras
- Coat of arms of Spain
- Incumbent; Guillermo Escribano Manzano since 11 March 2026
- Ministry of Foreign Affairs; Secretariat of State for Ibero-America
- Style: The Most Excellent
- Residence: Tegucigalpa
- Nominator: The Foreign Minister
- Appointer: The Monarch
- Term length: At the government's pleasure
- Precursor: Ambassador of Spain to Central America
- Inaugural holder: Alvaro Silvela de la Viesca, 4th Marquess of Santa María de Silvela, GE
- Formation: 1951
- Website: Mission of Spain to Honduras

The ambassador of Spain to Honduras is the official representative of the Kingdom of Spain to the Republic of Honduras.

Spain sent is first diplomatic representatives to Central America in the 1850s, with a unique ambassador to the whole region. The ambassador to Central America was responsible for establishing diplomatic relations with the newly formed republics of the region. In the case of Honduras, it was the last Central American nation to sign a treaty of peace, friendship and recognition with Spain. It was signed in 1894, after several delays. In 1943, the minister to El Salvador assumed also the Honduras–Spain relations until 1948. Since 1949, Spain has had a minister to Honduras and, in December 1951, the position was elevated to the rank of ambassador.

== List of ambassadors to Honduras (1943–present) ==
This list was compiled using the work "History of the Spanish Diplomacy" by the Spanish historian and diplomat Miguel Ángel Ochoa Brun. The work covers up to the year 2000, so the rest is based on appointments published in the Boletín Oficial del Estado.

Name	Rank	Term
The Minister of Spain to El Salvador		1943–1948
Eduardo María Danis y Maranjes	Minister	1949
Fernando de Kobbe y Chinchilla	Minister	1949–1951
Alvaro Silvela de la Viesca, Marquess of Santa María de Silvela	Minister	1951
Alvaro Silvela de la Viesca, Marquess of Santa María de Silvela	Ambassador	1951–1954
Luis Beltrán y González	Ambassador	1954
Valentín Vía y Ventalló	Ambassador	1954–1960
Emilio Núñez del Río	Ambassador	1960–1962
Justo Bermejo y Gómez	Ambassador	1962–1969
Alberto Pascual Villar	Ambassador	1970–1974
Evaristo Ron Vilas	Ambassador	1974–1977
José de Cuadra Echaide	Ambassador	1977–1982
Germán de Caso Ridaura	Ambassador	1982–1984
Fernando González-Camino García-Obregón	Ambassador	1984–1988
Julio Albi de la Cuesta	Ambassador	1988–1991
José Manuel López-Barrón de Labra	Ambassador	1991–1995
Carlos Gómez-Múgica	Ambassador	1996–2000
José Javier Nagore San Martín	Ambassador	2000–2004
Agustín Núñez Martínez	Ambassador	2004–2008
Ignacio Rupérez	Ambassador	2008–2010 (Note: Following the 2009 coup d'état, the ambassador was recalled. In late 2009 he was recalled again after spending two months in San Salvador, El Salvador, because the de facto government denied him entry for supporting the deposed president.)
Luis Belzuz	Ambassador	2010–2013
Miguel Albero Suárez	Ambassador	2013–2017
Guillermo Kirkpatrick de la Vega	Ambassador	2018–2022
Diego Nuño García	Ambassador	2022–2026
Guillermo Escribano Manzano	Ambassador	2026–pres.
