= List of ambassadors of Spain to Nicaragua =

Ambassador of Spain to Nicaragua
- Coat of arms of Spain
- Incumbent; Vacant since 4 March 2026
- Ministry of Foreign Affairs; Secretariat of State for Ibero-America
- Style: The Most Excellent
- Residence: Managua
- Nominator: The Foreign Minister
- Appointer: The Monarch
- Term length: At the government's pleasure
- Precursor: Ambassador of Spain to Central America
- Inaugural holder: Gaspar Sanz y Tovar
- Formation: 1950
- Website: Mission of Spain to Nicaragua

The ambassador of Spain to Nicaragua is the official representative of the Kingdom of Spain to the Republic of Nicaragua. In January 2026, the Nicaraguan government expelled several Spanish diplomats, including the ambassador and the second chief of mission. Since then, the chargé d'affaires a.i. is Alejandro Robles Monsalve, secretary of the embassy.

Spain sent is first diplomatic representatives to Central America in the 1850s, with a unique ambassador to the whole region. The ambassador to Central America was responsible for establishing diplomatic relations with the newly formed republics of the region. In the case of Nicaragua, it was one of the first Central American countries to establish ties with Spain with the signing of a treaty of peace, friendship and recognition in 1850. In 1920, the minister to El Salvador assumed also the Nicaragua–Spain relations until 1939, when the first independent minister of Spain to Nicaragua was appointed. In October 1950, the legation was elevated to the rank of embassy.

The last few years have been marked by tensions between the governments of both countries. While Spain does not recognize the legitimacy of the Nicaraguan government, Nicaragua has repeatedly accused Spain of interfering in its internal affairs. As a result, several ambassadors and other diplomats from both countries have been expelled or recalled.

== List of ambassadors to Nicaragua (1920–present) ==
This list was compiled using the work "History of the Spanish Diplomacy" by the Spanish historian and diplomat Miguel Ángel Ochoa Brun. The work covers up to the year 2000, so the rest is based on appointments published in the Boletín Oficial del Estado.

Name	Rank	Term
The Minister of Spain to El Salvador		1920–1939
Emilio Sanz y Tovar, Count of Lizárraga	Chargé d'affaires	1939–1940
Manuel García Moralejo	Chargé d'affaires	1940–1944
Gaspar Sanz y Tovar	Minister	1949–1950
Gaspar Sanz y Tovar	Ambassador	1950–1951
Manuel Travesedo y Silvela	Ambassador	1951–1955
Juan Álvarez de Estrada y Martín de Oliva	Ambassador	1955–1958
Enrique Beltrán y Manrique	Ambassador	1958–1960
José Antonio Giménez-Arnau	Ambassador	1961–1962
José Pérez del Arco y Rodríguez	Ambassador	1962–1966
Ernesto La Orden Miracle	Ambassador	1966–1969
José María de Garay y Garay	Ambassador	1970–1973
José García Bañón	Ambassador	1973–1977
Pedro Manuel de Arístegui Petit	Ambassador	1977–1980
Mariano Baselga Mantecón	Ambassador	1980–1983
Luis Cuervo Fábrega	Ambassador	1983–1986
Yago Pico de Coaña	Ambassador	1986–1987
Miguel Ángel Fernández-Mazarambroz Bernabeu	Ambassador	1987–1992
Fidel López Álvarez	Ambassador	1992–1996
Carlos Díaz Valcárcel	Ambassador	1996–2000
Ignacio Jesús Matellanes Martínez	Ambassador	2000–2004
Jaime Lacadena Higuera	Ambassador	2004–2008
Antonio Pérez-Hernández y Torra	Ambassador	2008–2011
León de la Torre	Ambassador	2011–2014
Rafael Garranzo García	Ambassador	2014–2018
Mar Fernández-Palacios	Ambassador	2018–2022 (Note: Spain recalled the ambassador in August 2021 and was formally dismissed in July 2022.)
Pilar María Terrén Lalana	Ambassador	2022–2025
Sergio Farré Salvá	Ambassador	2025–2026 (Note: Nicaragua expelled the Spanish ambassador in January 2026.)
