= List of ambassadors of Spain to Ethiopia =

Ambassador of Spain to Ethiopia
- Coat of arms of Spain
- Incumbent; Guillermo Antonio López Mac-Lellan since 29 November 2023
- Ministry of Foreign Affairs; Secretariat of State for Foreign Affairs
- Style: The Most Excellent
- Residence: Addis Ababa
- Nominator: The Foreign Minister
- Appointer: The Monarch
- Term length: At the government's pleasure
- Inaugural holder: José Luis Flórez-Estrada y Ayala
- Formation: 1962
- Website: Mission of Spain to Ethiopia

The ambassador of Spain to Ethiopia is the official representative of the Kingdom of Spain to the Federal Democratic Republic of Ethiopia. It is also accredited to the Republic of Djibouti and the Republic of Seychelles, and acts as Permanent Representation to the African Union and other international organizations based in Addis Ababa.

Although some contacts existed in previous centuries, diplomatic relations between the two countries were formalized during the dictatorship of Francisco Franco. Spain opened a legation in Addis Ababa in April 1951, appointing Domingo de las Bárcenas y López-Mollinedo, ambassador to Egypt, as envoy. In 1962, the legation was raised to embassy status.

== Jurisdiction ==
- Ethiopia: It is the embassy's main jurisdiction and it also provides consular services to Spanish citizens.

It is also accredited to:

- Djibouti: It has an honorary vice-consulate in Gallieni Boulevard, Djibouti City.
- Seychelles: It has an honorary consulate in Mahé, Seychelles.
- African Union: The ambassador of Spain to Ethiopia is the permanent observer ambassador to the African Union.

It also coordinates Spanish activities to the United Nations Economic Commission for Africa and the Intergovernmental Authority on Development.

== List of ambassadors ==
Ambassador		Term	Nominated by	Appointed by	Accredited to
Envoy Extraordinary and Minister Plenipotentiary
-	Domingo de las Bárcenas y López-Mollinedo (Note: Resident in Cairo.)	10 June 1951 – 18 March 1953 (1 year, 281 days)	Alberto Martín-Artajo	Francisco Franco	Haile Selassie
-	José Fernández-Villaverde; Marquess consort of Santa Cruz	18 March 1953 – 11 March 1955 (1 year, 358 days)	Luis Carrero Blanco (acting)	Francisco Franco	Haile Selassie
-	José del Castaño Cardona	5 October 1955 – 27 August 1958 (2 years, 326 days)	Alberto Martín-Artajo	Francisco Franco	Haile Selassie
-	José Felipe de Alcover y Sureda	27 August 1958 – 10 April 1961 (2 years, 226 days)	Fernando María Castiella	Francisco Franco	Haile Selassie
-	José Luis Pérez-Flórez-Estrada y Ayala	10 April 1961 – 21 September 1962 (1 year, 164 days)	Fernando María Castiella	Francisco Franco	Haile Selassie
Ambassador Extraordinary and Plenipotentiary
1	José Luis Flórez-Estrada y Ayala	21 September 1962 – 9 April 1968 (5 years, 201 days)	Fernando María Castiella	Francisco Franco	Haile Selassie
2	Salvador García de Pruneda (Note: Accredited to Yemen.)	24 March 1969 – 18 September 1973 (4 years, 178 days)	Fernando María Castiella	Francisco Franco	Haile Selassie
3	José Luis de la Peña Aznar	12 October 1973 – 23 June 1976 (2 years, 255 days)	Laureano López Rodó	Francisco Franco	Haile Selassie
4	Jesús Núñez Hernández (Note: Accredited to Seychelles and Yemen.)	2 August 1976 – 29 July 1981 (4 years, 361 days)	The Marquess of Oreja	Juan Carlos I	Tafari Benti
5	Mariano Berdejo Rivera (Note: Accredited to Djibouti and Seychelles.)	22 October 1981 – 24 December 1982 (1 year, 63 days)	José Pedro Pérez-Llorca	Juan Carlos I	Mengistu Haile Mariam
6	Enrique Roméu Ramos (Note: Accredited to Djibouti, Seychelles and Yemen.); Count of Barbate	19 May 1983 – 26 February 1987 (3 years, 283 days)	Fernando Morán	Juan Carlos I	Mengistu Haile Mariam
7	Enrique Martínez Morcillo	13 May 1987 – 3 September 1991 (4 years, 113 days)	Francisco Fernández Ordóñez	Juan Carlos I	Mengistu Haile Mariam
8	José María Iparraguirre Thomas	18 December 1991 – 20 February 1993 (1 year, 64 days)	Francisco Fernández Ordóñez	Juan Carlos I	Meles Zenawi (acting)
9	Aurora Bernáldez	26 April 1993 – 26 February 1998 (4 years, 306 days)	Javier Solana	Juan Carlos I	Meles Zenawi (acting)
10	Pablo Zaldívar Miquelarena (Note: Accredited to Eritrea and Djibouti.)	21 May 1998 – 30 November 2002 (4 years, 193 days)	Abel Matutes	Juan Carlos I	Negasso Gidada
11	Rafael Dezcallar	30 November 2002 – 14 June 2004 (1 year, 197 days)	Ana Palacio	Juan Carlos I	Girma Wolde-Giorgis
12	María del Carmen de la Peña Corcuera	26 June 2004 – 14 June 2008 (3 years, 354 days)	Miguel Ángel Moratinos	Juan Carlos I	Girma Wolde-Giorgis
13	Antonio Sánchez-Benedito	9 September 2008 – 4 October 2011 (3 years, 25 days)	Miguel Ángel Moratinos	Juan Carlos I	Girma Wolde-Giorgis
14	Miguel Ángel Fernández-Palacios	4 October 2011 – 18 July 2015 (3 years, 287 days)	Trinidad Jiménez	Juan Carlos I	Girma Wolde-Giorgis
15	Borja Montesino Martínez del Cerro	18 July 2015 – 5 August 2020 (5 years, 18 days)	José Manuel García-Margallo	Felipe VI	Mulatu Teshome
16	Manuel Salazar Palma	5 August 2020 – 29 November 2023 (3 years, 116 days)	Arancha González Laya	Felipe VI	Sahle-Work Zewde
17	Guillermo Antonio López Mac-Lellan	29 November 2023 – present (2 years, 282 days)	José Manuel Albares	Felipe VI	Sahle-Work Zewde

== See also ==
- Ethiopia–Spain relations
