= Joint Congress-Senate Committee on the European Union =

The Joint Congress-Senate Committee on the European Union (Spanish: Comisión Mixta Congreso-Senado para la Unión Europea) is a parliamentary committee of the Spanish Cortes Generales formed by members of the Congress of Deputies and the Senate. A natural evolution of the Joint Committee on the European Communities (created in 1985), the Joint Committee on the European Union is devoted to the participation of the Parliament on EU affairs, obtaining information in order to have influence on the stance of the Government. Since its launch, its functions were expanded after the signing of the Treaty of Lisbon through the Law 24/2009, of 22 December 2009 and the Law 38/2010, of 20 December 2010, modifying the original Law 8/1994.

== Presidents ==
Legislators chairing the committee:

6th term

- Pedro Solbes Mira (10 June 1996 – 15 September 1999)
- Josep Borrell Fontelles (28 September – 18 January 2000)

7th term

- Josep Borrell Fontelles (23 May 2000 – 20 January 2004)

8th term

- Ana Palacio Vallelersundi (27 May 2004 – 28 August 2006)
- Carlos Aragonés Mendiguchía (7 September 2006 – 15 January 2008)

9th term

- Miguel Arias Cañete (3 June 2008 – 27 September 2011)

10th term

- Gerardo Camps Devesa (8 February 2012 – 27 October 2015)

11th term

- José Zaragoza Alonso (24 February 2016 – 3 May 2016)

12th term

- María Soraya Rodríguez Ramos (16 November 2016 – 5 March 2019)

13th term

- Susana Sumelzo Jordán (since 30 July 2019)

== Bibliography ==
- Ferrer Martín de Vidales, Covadonga (2013). "La Comisión Mixta para la Unión Europea. Sus nuevas competencias tras el Tratado de Lisboa y la influencia de los factores constitucionales del Estado español en su eficacia" (PDF). Revista de Derecho Comunitario Europeo. 17 (45): 631–658. ISSN 1138-4026.
