= List of ambassadors of Spain to Costa Rica =

Ambassador of Spain to Costa Rica
- Coat of arms of Spain
- Incumbent; Juan Ignacio Morro Villacián since 27 August 2025
- Ministry of Foreign Affairs; Secretariat of State for Ibero-America
- Style: The Most Excellent
- Residence: San José
- Nominator: The Foreign Minister
- Appointer: The Monarch
- Term length: At the government's pleasure
- Precursor: Ambassador of Spain to Central America
- Inaugural holder: José María Cavanillas y Rodríguez
- Formation: 1950
- Website: Mission of Spain to Costa Rica

The ambassador of Spain to Costa Rica is the official representative of the Kingdom of Spain to the Republic of Costa Rica.

Spain sent is first diplomatic representatives to Central America in the 1850s, with a unique ambassador to the whole region. The ambassador to Central America was responsible for establishing diplomatic relations with the newly formed republics of the region. In the case of Costa Rica, both countries signed a treaty of peace, friendship, and recognition in 1850.

In 1934, Spain appointed Luis Quer y Boule as the first independent diplomat to take care of Costa Rica's affairs and, in 1950, the diplomatic representation was elevated to the rank of embassy.

== List of ambassadors to Costa Rica (1934–present) ==
This list was compiled using the work "History of the Spanish Diplomacy" by the Spanish historian and diplomat Miguel Ángel Ochoa Brun. The work covers up to the year 2000, so the rest is based on appointments published in the Boletín Oficial del Estado.

Nombre	Rank	Mandato
Luis Quer y Boule	Chargé d'affaires and Consul General	1934–1935
Gonzalo de Ojeda y Brooke	Chargé d'affaires and Consul General	1935–1940
Emilio Sanz y Tovar, Count of Lizárraga	Chargé d'affaires and Consul General	1939–1940
Ángel de la Mora y Arena	Minister	1940–1943
Manuel García Moralejo	Chargé d'affaires	1941
Rafael de los Casares y Moya	Chargé d'affaires	1944–1947
José María Cavanillas y Rodríguez	Minister	1947–1950
José María Cavanillas y Rodríguez	Ambassador	1950–1956
Emilio Núñez del Río	Ambassador	1957–1960
Valentín Vía Ventalló	Ambassador	1960–1965
José Manuel de Abaroa y Goñi	Ambassador	1965–1969
José Ramón Sobredo	Ambassador	1969–1972
Ernesto La Orden Miracle	Ambassador	1972–1976
Juan Pérez-Urruti Maura	Ambassador	1976–1977
Manuel Aguilar Otermin	Ambassador	1977–1982
Gonzalo Fernández de Córdova y Moreno	Ambassador	1982–1985
Mercedes Rico	Ambassador	1985–1987
Alfonso Ortiz Ramos	Ambassador	1987–1992
Ignacio Aguirre Borrel	Ambassador	1992–1997
Víctor Ibáñez-Martín Mellado	Ambassador	1997–2002
Juan José Urtasun	Ambassador	2002–2006
Arturo Reig Tapia	Ambassador	2006–2011
Elena Madrazo Hegewisch	Ambassador	2011–2014
Jesús María Rodríguez-Andía y Parada	Ambassador	2014–2018
María Cristina Pérez Gutiérrez	Ambassador	2018–2022
Eva Felicia Martínez Sánchez	Ambassador	2022–2025
Juan Ignacio Morro	Ambassador	2025–pres.
