= Mercedes Rico =

Spanish diplomat

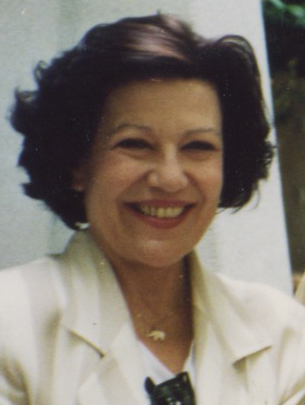

María de las Mercedes Rico Carabias (21 January 1945 – 15 June 2022) was a Spanish diplomat and politician. She was Spain's first female ambassador, representing the country in Costa Rica (1985–1987), Italy (1994–1996) and Ireland (2008–2011). From 2004 to 2008, she was in charge of the General Directorate for Religious Affairs, within the Ministry of Justice.

== Biography ==
Rico's mother was Josefina Carabias (1912–1980), one of Spain's first female journalists, who documented the Spanish Civil War. Her older sister was the writer Carmen Rico Godoy (1939–2001), who was born in Paris shortly after the war, as their parents claimed asylum due to their socialist and republican views. Rico was born in Madrid as the family had returned to Francoist Spain, where her Almería-born father José Rico Godoy was sentenced to 12 years in prison for political reasons.

Rico joined the diplomatic services in 1973, as the third woman to enter the profession in Spain. In the early 1980s, she was a dance critic for El País. In 1985, she became the ambassador to Costa Rica, and also her country's first female ambassador. In 1994, she was made the country's representative in Italy, simultaneously holding the responsibility in San Marino and Albania.

In 2004, Rico was named in charge of the General Directorate for Religious Affairs in the Ministry of Justice under Juan Fernando López Aguilar, in the government of José Luis Rodríguez Zapatero. Rico promoted a secular state with diversity of religion. Zapatero's government enacted socially liberal policies such as same-sex marriage and divorce reform, leading to confrontations with the Catholic Church. Prelates of the church refused to shake hands with ministers, and Rico was personally attacked on religious radio stations.

Towards the end of her life, Rico was a consul in London, living with ambassador Federico Trillo. She returned to the city of her birth in order to be closer to her sister's granddaughters, and died unexpectedly on 15 June 2022, aged 77.
