= Pilar Cancela Rodríguez =

Spanish politician (born 1967)

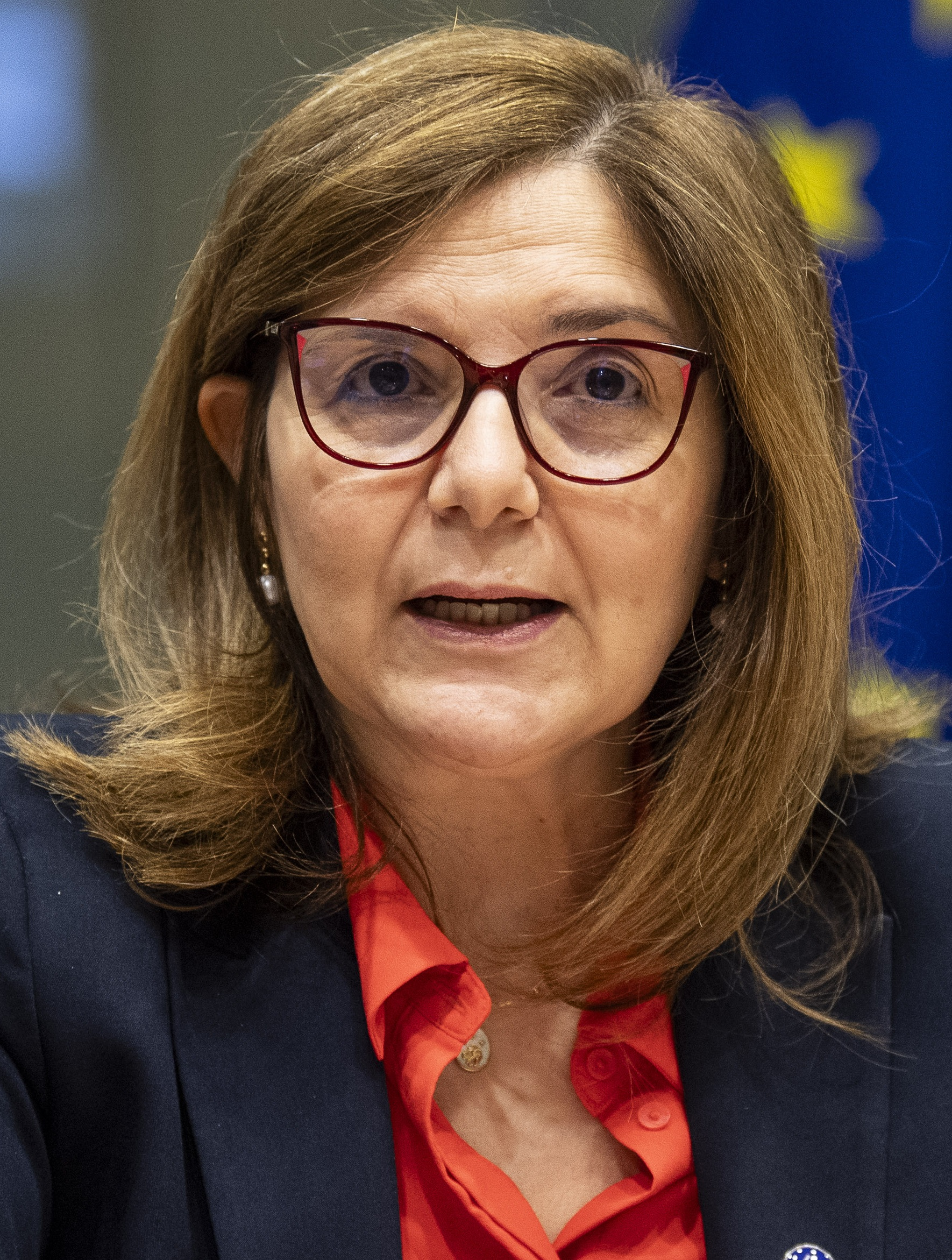

Secretary of State for Migration
- Incumbent
- Assumed office December 6, 2023
- Preceded by: Isabel Castro Fernández

Secretary of State for International Cooperation
- In office July 21, 2021 – December 6, 2023
- Preceded by: Ángeles Moreno Bau
- Succeeded by: Eva Granados

Member of the Congress of Deputies for A Coruña
- In office January 5, 2016 – July 27, 2021

Personal details
- Born: August 21, 1967 (age 58) Stuttgart, Germany
- Party: PSOE; PSdeG–PSOE
- Education: University of Santiago de Compostela
- Occupation: Politician

Pilar Cancela Rodríguez (born August 21, 1967) is a Spanish politician who has been serving as secretary of state for migration since 2023. Previously, she served as secretary of state for international cooperation from 2021 to 2023.

Since 2017, Cancela Rodríguez has been Secretary of the PSOE's Migration and Foreign Policies area in the Federal Executive Committee. She has been member of the Congress of Deputies during the XI, XII, XIII and XIV legislatures. From September 2016 to July 2021, she chaired the Congress of Deputies' Equality Committee.

== Career ==
Cancela Rodríguez was secretary of Organization of the PSdeG.

=== Member of Parliament ===
In December 2015, Cancela Rodríguez was elected deputy for La Coruña in Congress, being reelected in 2016. In September of that same year she was elected President of the Equality Commission of the Congress.

In June 2017, Cancela Rodríguez was elected secretary of the area of Migration Policies and PSOE del Exterior in the executive of Pedro Sánchez.

In her work in Congress, Cancela Rodríguez chaired the Subcommittee created within the Equality Commission for the elaboration of the State Pact on Gender Violence, approved on September 28, 2017, in the Plenary. In July 2021, she left the presidency of the Equality Commission, being replaced on September 30, 2021, by Carmen Calvo.

=== Career in government ===
On July 21, 2021, Cancela Rodríguez was appointed Secretary of State for International Cooperation.

In 2023, United Nations Secretary-General António Guterres appointed Cancela Rodríguez to co-chair his Advisory Group on Local and Regional Governments, alongside Fatimatou Abdel Malick.

In December 2023, Cancela was appointed Secretary of State for Migration.

== Other activities ==
- Barcelona Institute for Global Health (ISGlobal), Member of the Board of Trustees
