= Juan Pablo de Laiglesia =

Spanish diplomat (1948–2022)

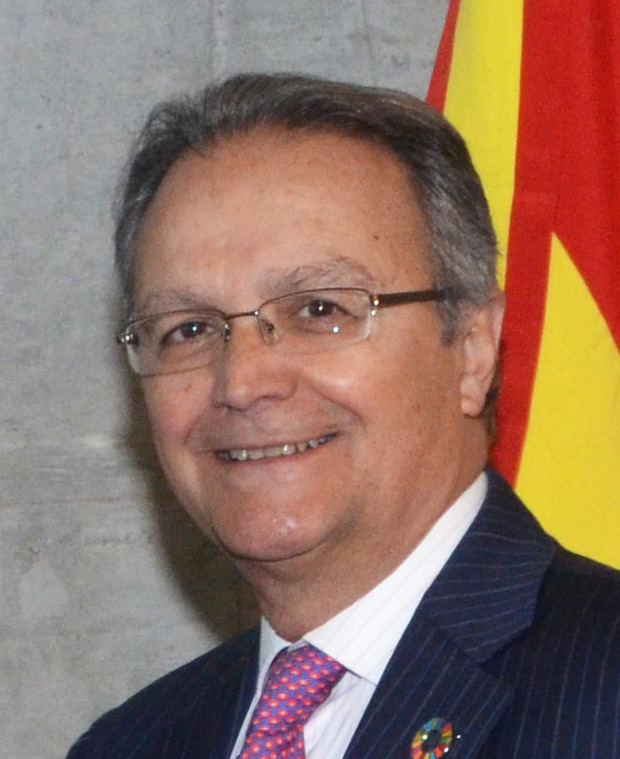
- De Laiglesia in 2019

Secretary of State for International Cooperation AECID President
- In office 23 June 2018 – 5 February 2020
- Preceded by: Fernando García Casas
- Succeeded by: Ángeles Moreno Bau

Secretary of State for Foreign Affairs
- In office 27 July 2010 – 6 November 2010
- Preceded by: Ángel Lossada Torres-Quevedo
- Succeeded by: Juan Antonio Yáñez-Barnuevo

Personal details
- Born: Juan Pablo de Laiglesia y González de Peredo; 6 August 1948 Madrid, Spain
- Died: 4 March 2022 (aged 73)

Juan Pablo de Laiglesia y González de Peredo (6 August 1948 – 4 March 2022) was a Spanish diplomat. He served concurrently as Secretary of State for International Cooperation and President of the Spanish Agency for International Development Cooperation from 2018 to 2020 and was Secretary of State for Foreign Affairs from July to November 2010. He died on 4 March 2022, at the age of 73.
