= Nicolás Pascual de la Parte =

Spanish politician (born 1959)

Nicolás Pascual de la Parte MEP
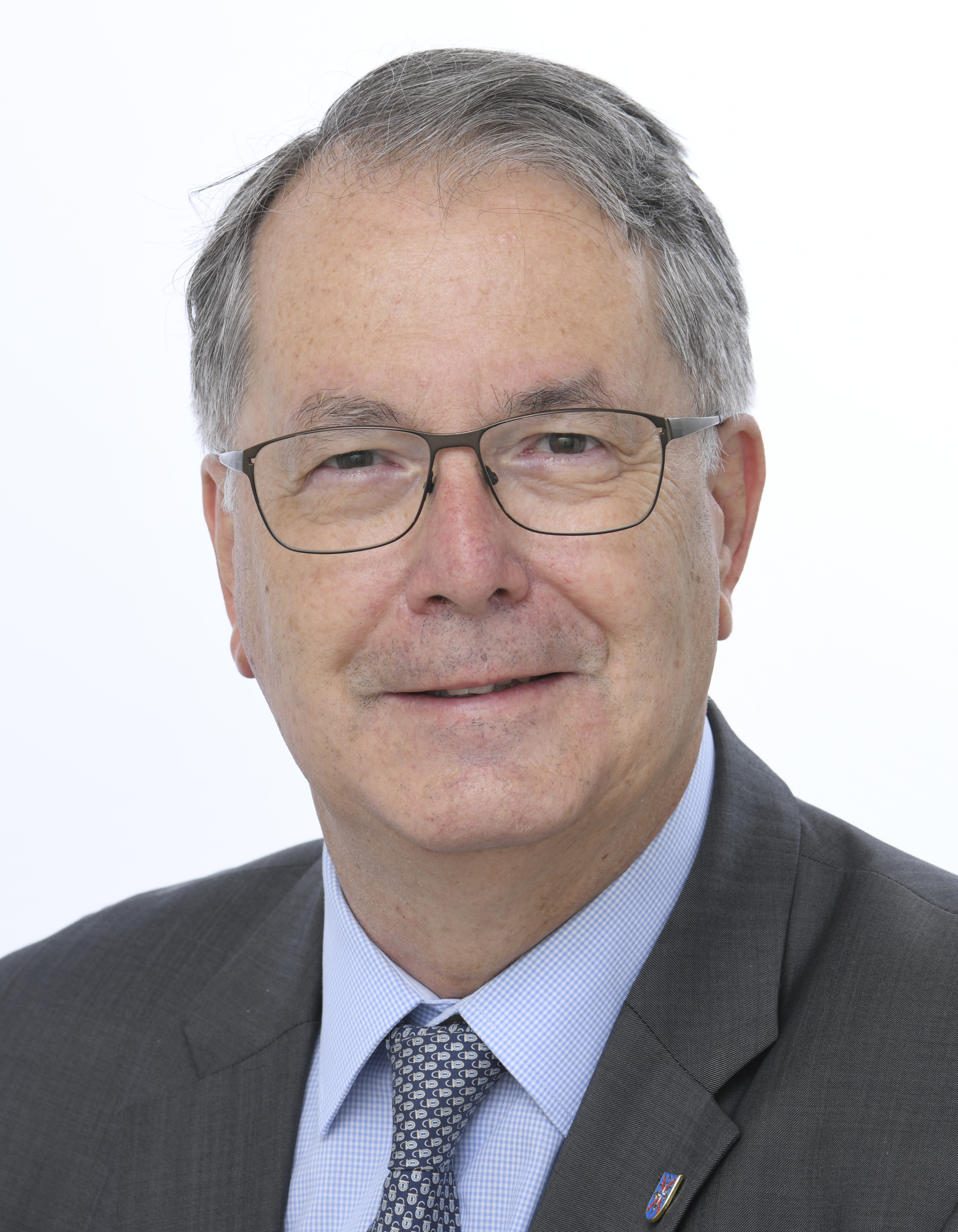
- Nicolás Pascual de la Parte (2024)

Member of the European Parliament
- Incumbent
- Assumed office 16 July 2024
- Constituency: Spain

Ambassador of Spain to NATO
- In office 5 November 2017 – 13 September 2018
- Preceded by: Miguel Aguirre de Cárcer
- Succeeded by: Miguel Ángel Fernández-Palacios

Personal details
- Born: 21 April 1959 (age 66) Cieza, Spain
- Party: People's Party
- Other political affiliations: European People's Party

Nicolás Pascual de la Parte (Spanish pronunciation: [nikoˈlas pasˈkwal ðe la ˈpaɾte]; born 21 April 1959) is a Spanish diplomat and politician of the People's Party who was elected member of the European Parliament in 2024. He previously served as ambassador of Spain to NATO and to the Political and Security Committee, and worked for the Cabinet Office.
