= Federico Torres Muro =

Spanish diplomat (born 1957)

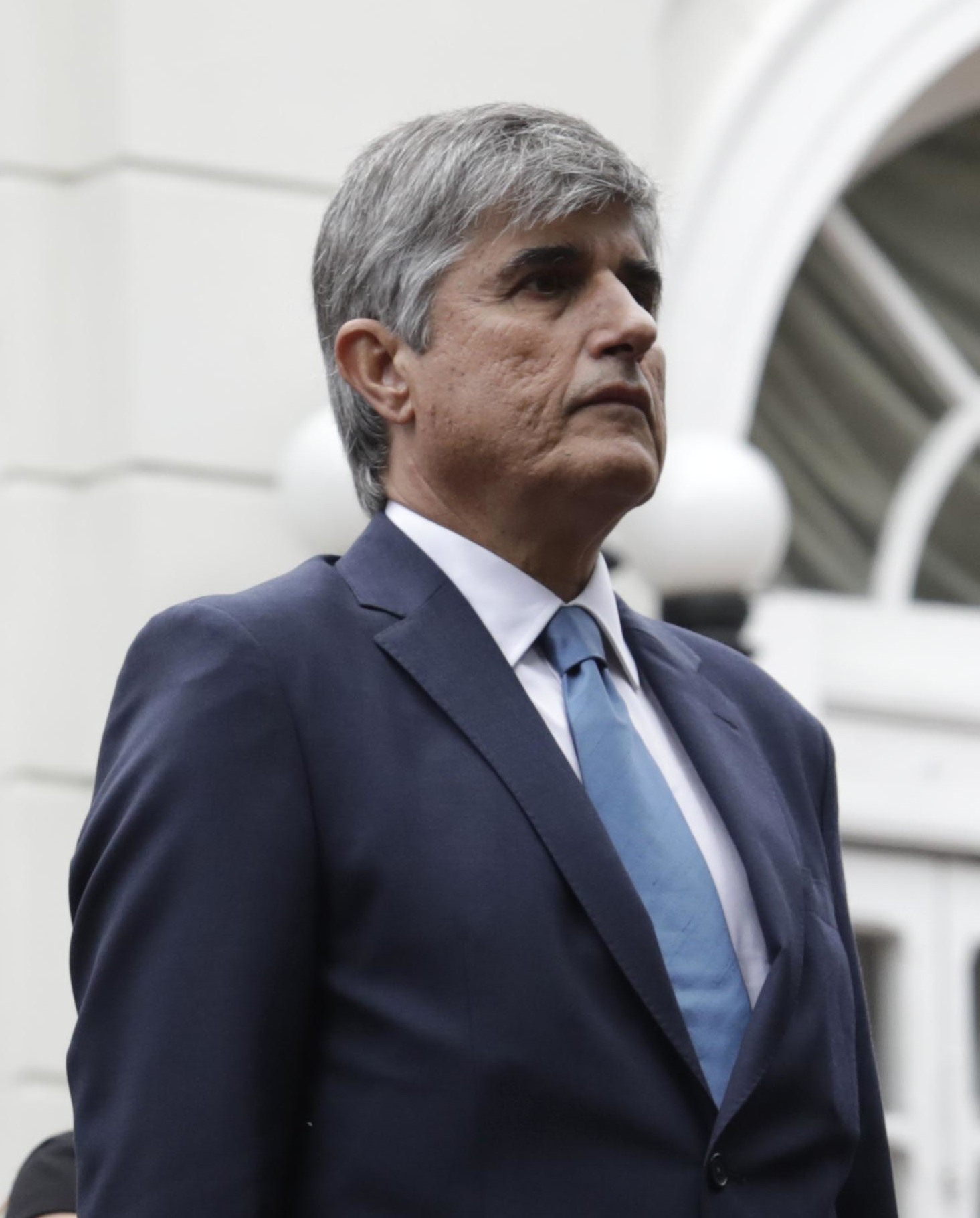

Ambassador of Spain to NATO
- Incumbent
- Assumed office 11 October 2022
- Preceded by: Miguel Ángel Fernández-Palacios

Ambassador of Spain to El Salvador
- In office 24 June 2017 – February 2020

Ambassador of Spain to Ecuador
- In office 2008 – 31 March 2012

Personal details
- Born: Federico Torres Muro; 22 July 1957 (age 68) La Felguera, Spain

Federico Torres Muro (born on 22 July 1957), is a Spanish diplomat who is currently the Permanent Representative to NATO since October 2022.

Previously, he was the ambassador of Spain to Ecuador (2008-2012), to El Salvador (2017-2020), and the general director of Foreign and Security Policy from 2021 to 2022.

== Biography ==
In 2008, he was appointed ambassador of Spain to Ecuador, a position he held until March 2012.

On 24 June 2017 he was appointed ambassador of Spain to El Salvador. He left that role in February 2020.

Later he was general director of Strategy, Foresight and Coherence.

In 2021, he was appointed Director General of Foreign and Security Policy until 11 October 2022, when he was appointed as permanent representative to NATO.
