= List of permanent representatives of Spain to NATO =

Senior diplomat

Ambassador Permanent Representative of Spain to the North Atlantic Council
- Coat of arms of Spain

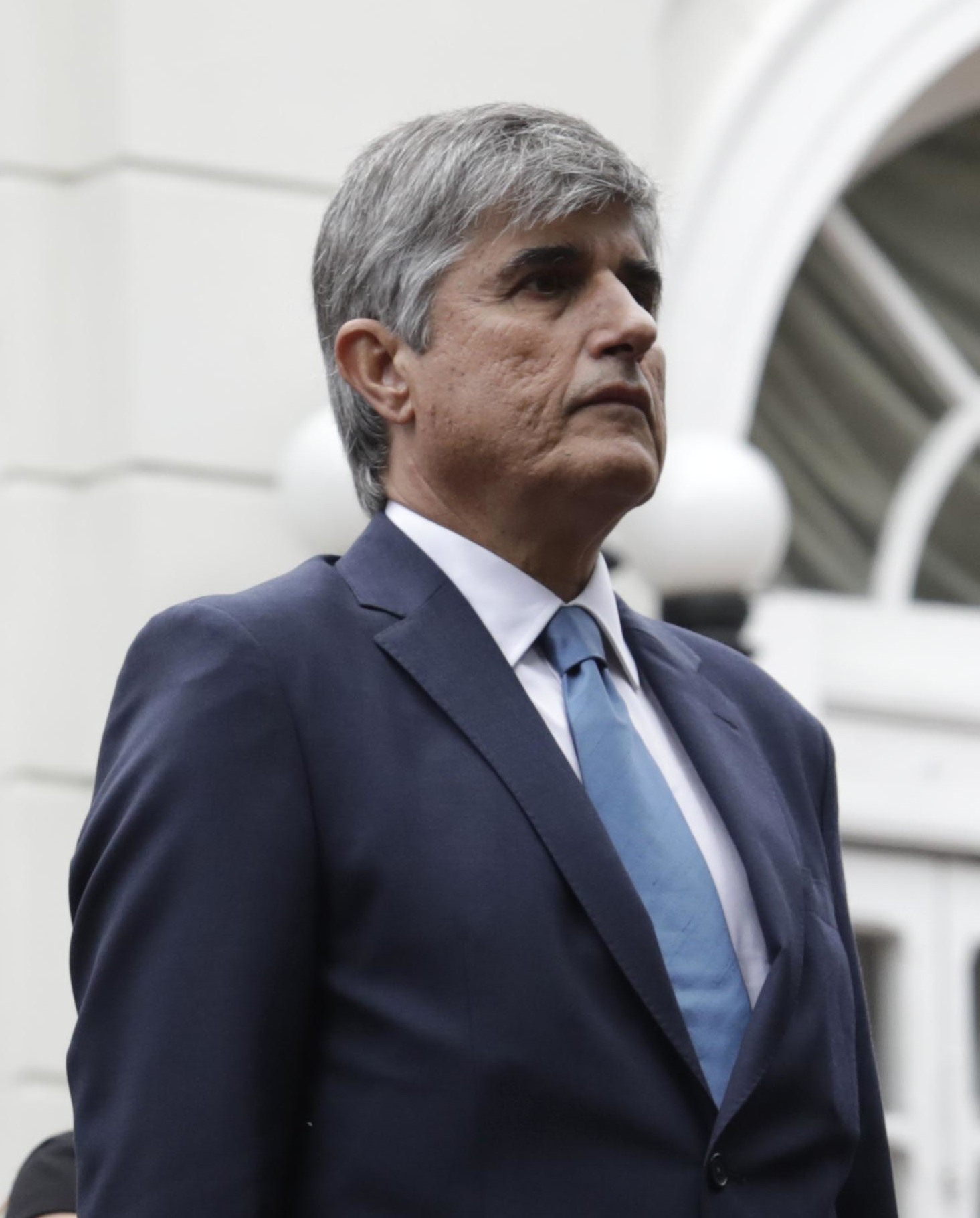
- Incumbent; Federico Torres Muro since 12 October 2022
- Ministry of Foreign Affairs; Secretariat of State for Foreign Affairs
- Style: The Most Excellent
- Member of: North Atlantic Council
- Residence: Brussels
- Nominator: The Foreign Minister
- Appointer: The Monarch
- Inaugural holder: Nuño Aguirre de Cárcer
- Formation: 9 July 1982; 44 years ago
- Deputy: Deputy Permanent Representative
- Website: Spanish Mission to NATO

The ambassador permanent representative of Spain to the North Atlantic Council, also called ambassador permanent representative of Spain to the Council of the North Atlantic Treaty Organization or simply ambassador of Spain to NATO, is the official representative of the Kingdom of Spain to the North Atlantic Treaty Organization (NATO).

The ambassador represents Spanish interests before the political bodies of the Organization. Regarding military affairs, the Ministry of Defence, through the Defence Staff, has a Military Representation headed by an officer, appointed by the Monarch at the joint request of the ministers of foreign affairs and defence. The current military representative is vice admiral (OF-7) José María Núñez Torrente since September 2024.

== List of ambassadors ==
Ambassador		Term	Ref.
1	Nuño Aguirre de Cárcer y López de Sagredo	9 July 1982 – 29 July 1982	
2	Francisco Javier Rupérez Rubio	29 July 1982 – 8 December 1982	
3	Jaime de Ojeda y Eiseley	22 January 1983 – 3 March 1990	
4	Máximo Cajal López	3 March 1990 – 10 April 1991	
5	Carlos Miranda y Elío	13 April 1991 – 8 June 1996	
6	Francisco Javier Conde de Saro	8 June 1996 – 3 June 2000	
7	Juan Prat y Coll	3 June 2000 – 3 July 2004	
8	Pablo Benavides	3 July 2004 – 5 July 2008	
9	Carlos Miranda y Elío	5 July 2008 – 11 February 2012	
10	José de Carvajal Salido	11 February 2012 – 5 October 2013	
11	Miguel Aguirre de Cárcer y García del Arenal	5 October 2013 – 24 October 2017	
12	Nicolás Pascual de la Parte	24 October 2017 – 28 July 2018	
13	Miguel Ángel Fernández-Palacios	28 July 2018 – 12 October 2022	
14	Federico Torres Muro	12 October 2022 – present	

== See also ==
- 1986 Spanish NATO membership referendum
- NATO Rapid Deployable Corps – Spain
