= Máximo Cajal López =

Spanish diplomat

Máximo Cajal López (February 17, 1935 – April 3, 2014) was a Spanish diplomat and ambassador.

López was born in Madrid. He was the Spanish ambassador to Guatemala in 1980 and was one of the two survivors of the burning of the Spanish Embassy (the other being Guatemalan lawyer Mario Aguirre Godoy). He was also ambassador to Sweden and France as well as Permanent Representative of Spain to NATO.

He was also the special representative of the Spanish Prime Minister, José Luis Rodríguez Zapatero, in the Alliance of Civilizations.

He died on April 3, 2014, in Madrid.

== Works ==
- Cajal, Máximo (1999). ¡Saber quién puso fuego allí!. Masacre en la embajada de España en Guatemala. SidiHarth Metha.
- Cajal, Máximo (2003). ¡Ceuta y Melilla, Olivenza y Gibraltar. ¿Dónde acaba España?. Siglo XXI. ISBN 84-323-1138-3.
