= Eva Granados =

Spanish politician (born 1975)

The Most Excellent Eva Granados
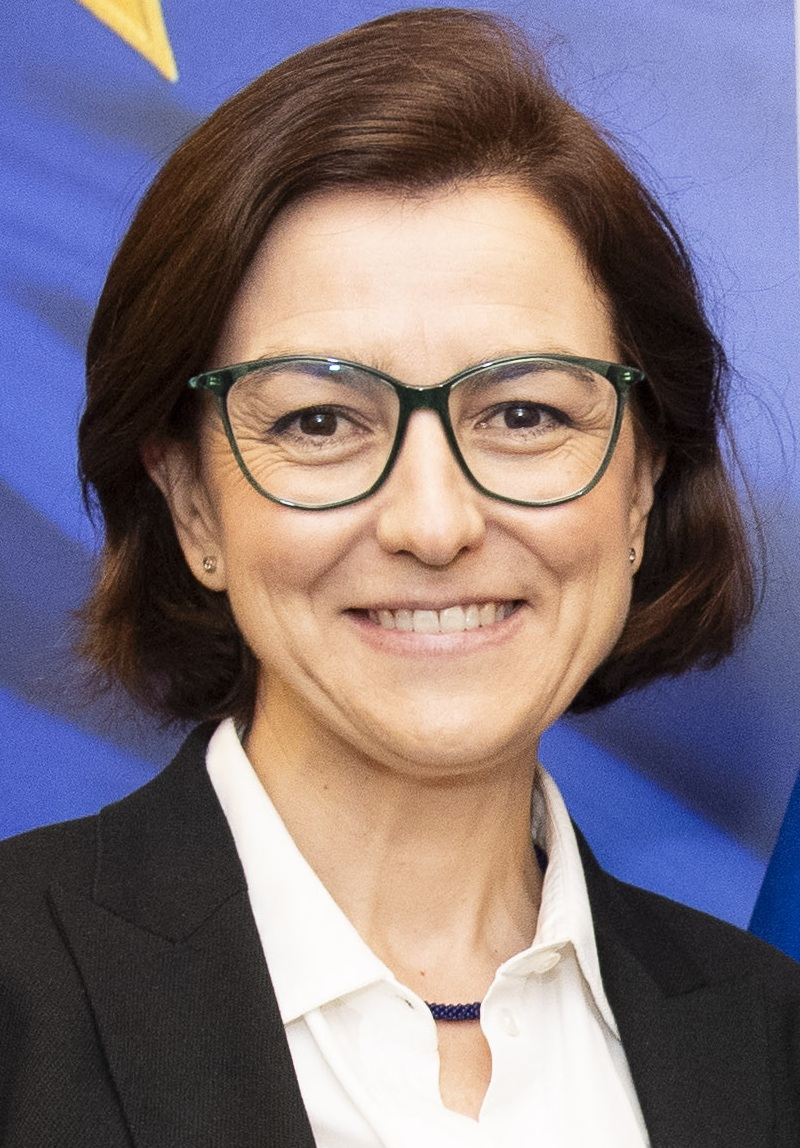

Secretary of State for International Cooperation
- Incumbent
- Assumed office 6 December 2023
- Preceded by: Pilar Cancela Rodríguez

Senator designated by the Parliament of Catalonia
- In office 1 October 2021 – 2 January 2024

Spokesperson of the Socialist Group in the Parliament of Catalonia
- In office 26 October 2015 – 12 March 2021
- Preceded by: Maurici Lucena
- Succeeded by: Alícia Romero

Member of the Parliament of Catalonia for the Province of Barcelona
- In office 16 December 2010 – 5 October 2021

Personal details
- Born: January 6, 1975 (age 51) Barcelona, Spain
- Citizenship: Spanish
- Party: Socialists' Party of Catalonia
- Other political affiliations: Spanish Socialist Workers' Party
- Education: University of Barcelona; ESADE; Complutense University of Madrid
- Occupation: Politician
- Website: @Eva_Granados

Eva Maria Granados Galiano (born 6 January 1975) is a Spanish politician serving as secretary of state for international cooperation and ex officio president of the Spanish Agency for International Development Cooperation (AECID) since 2023.

A member of the Socialists' Party of Catalonia, before entering in national politics in 2021, she had a very active role in regional politics, being a member of the Parliament of Catalonia from 2010 to 2023 and spokesperson for her party in the same regional parliament from 2015 to 2021.

In October 2021, the Catalan parliament appointed her as senator and, in the Senate, she served as spokesperson of the Spanish Socialist Workers' Party from 2021 to 2023. In December 2023, foreign minister José Manuel Albares appointed her as Secretary of State for International Cooperation.

== Biography ==
She has studied Political Science and Administration at the University of Barcelona, a Master in Public Management at ESADE and is an expert in the labor market and social dialogue at the Complutense University of Madrid in collaboration with the Julián Besteiro School of UGT. She has been linked to the University of Barcelona in the field of research and Human Rights and to information and encouragement of young people in the Student Information and Services Center of Catalonia (CISEC).

She is a member of the patronage of the Rafael Campalans Foundation, dedicated to the dissemination of democratic socialist thought.

== Political career ==
He has belonged to the Association of Young Students of Catalonia (AJEC). Granados is part of the Party of the Socialists of Catalonia since 1999 in the Group of Pallejà in the Federation of the Baix Llobregat.

Affiliated in the General Union of Workers of Catalonia, she has been a member of the National Secretariat of the UGT from 2002 to 2010. She has represented UGT as a counselor and vice-president of the Economic and Social Work Council of Catalonia, in the Occupation Service of Catalonia, Industrial Pact of the Metropolitan Region of Barcelona and the Strategic Metropolitan Plan of Barcelona. He has also been a member of the Economic and Social Council of Spain, the Public Employment Service of the State and the Council of the European Social Fund.

In November 2010, she was elected deputy of the Parliament of Catalonia for the seat of Barcelona, which she revalidated in November 2012. She has been deputy spokesperson for the socialist group in the Catalan parliament and from January 2013 to August 2015, date of dissolution of the X legislature and spokesperson for the Commission for Social Welfare, Family and Immigration of its parliamentary group.

Since December 2011 she has been a member of the PSC executive, first led by Pere Navarro and since June 2014 by Miquel Iceta, where she is responsible for Social Cohesion.

In March 2015, she was part of the Promoting Commission of the Popular Legislative Initiative for Guaranteed Citizenship Income, supported by personalities from the cultural sphere and more than 50 social, civic and political entities to demand from the Catalan government the processing of a proposal of law on this subject carried out by way of urgency.

In July 2015 it was announced that she would occupy the number of 2 on the PSC list that Miquel Iceta will head to the regional elections on 27 September. She occupied the same place in the lists for the regional elections of 21 December 2017 after the dissolution of the Parliament in application of article 155 of the Spanish Constitution.

On 30 September 2021, the Catalan parliament appointed her as senator, where she also served as spokesperson of the Spanish Socialist Workers' Party.

=== Secretary of State for International Cooperation ===
In December 2023, foreign minister José Manuel Albares nominated her as Secretary of State for International Cooperation. She left her Senate positions in early 2024.

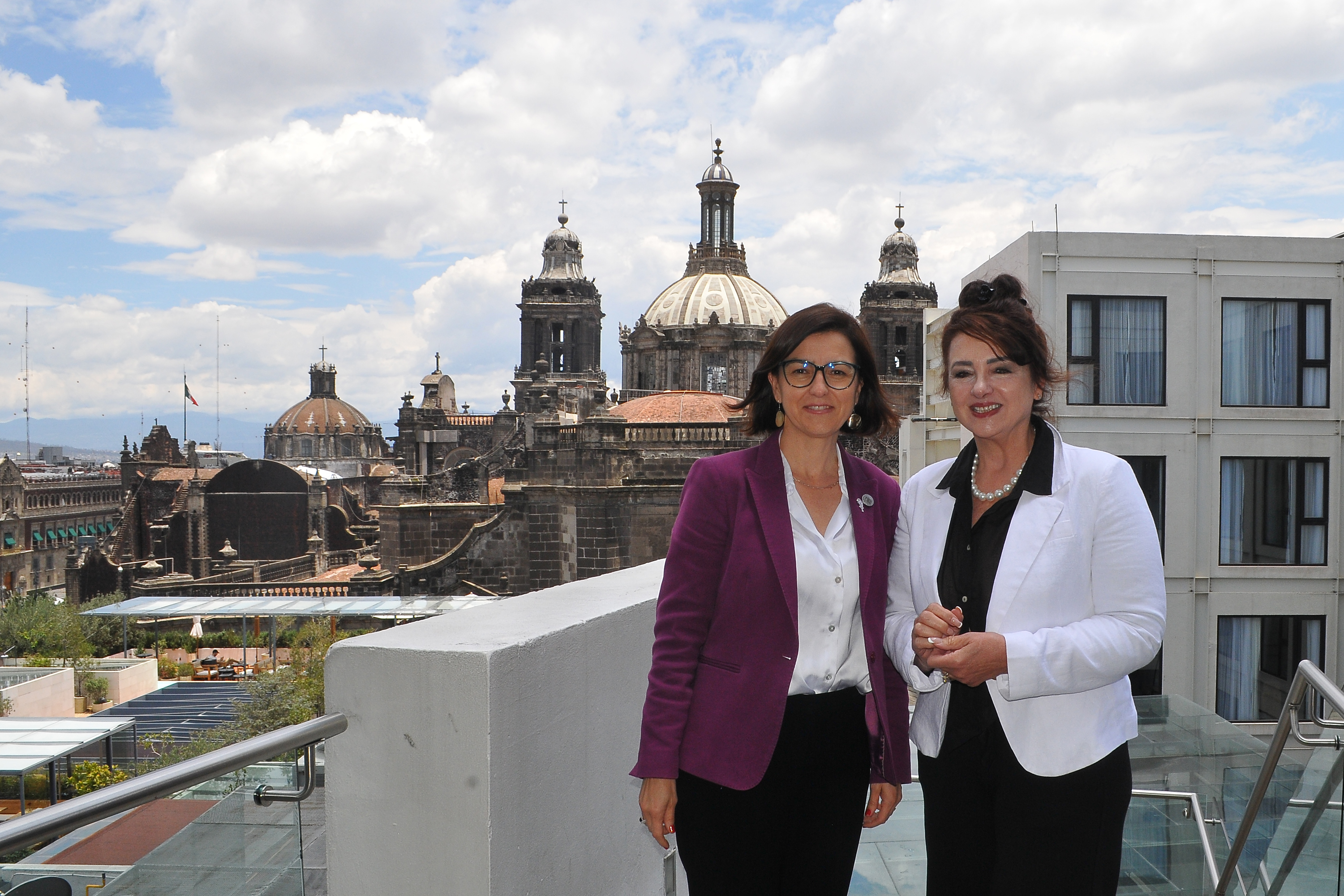
State Secretary Granados and European Commissioner Helena Dalli during a trip to Mexico

As the top official responsible for Spanish Cooperation, the state secretary has accompanied Queen Letizia on international cooperation trips to Guatemala (2024), Cape Verde (2025) and Bolivia (2026), and has also made solo trips to Mauritania and Senegal in November 2024, Guatemala and Costa Rica in November 2025 and to Panama in February 2026, among others.

In 2025, Granados promoted to apply a feminist approach to the development financing policy, in cooperation with the Carolina Foundation and UN Women. In this sense, Granados defended this feminist approach "to contribute to more equitable, prosperous and sustainable societies" and, to achieve this, she emphasized "we are working to mainstream the gender perspective across all areas of the development finance agenda: from reforming the international financial architecture to designing financial instruments and gender-responsive budgeting".

In the context of the 70th session of the United Nations Commission on the Status of Women, which Spain attended and whose delegation was headed by Granados, on 11 March 2026 she presented, at the Instituto Cervantes headquarters in New York, the first Feminist Cooperation Strategy of the Spanish government. This strategy revolves around four pillars: 1. women's rights, 2. women's institutional representation and participation, 3. human & financial resources, and 4. alliances to achieve them.
