= Miguel Ángel Fernández-Palacios =

Spanish diplomat (born 1965)

Spanish Ambassador to Italy
- Incumbent
- Assumed office 12 October 2022
- Preceded by: Alfonso Dastis

Permanent Representative of Spain to NATO
- In office 28 July 2018 – 12 October 2022
- Preceded by: Nicolás Pascual de la Parte
- Succeeded by: Federico Torres Muro

Ambassador to Democratic Republic of the Congo
- In office 2006–2008

Personal details
- Born: Miguel Ángel Fernández-Palacios Martínez; 1 October 1965 (age 60) Las Palmas de Gran Canaria, Spain
- Education: Complutense University of Madrid

Miguel Ángel Fernández-Palacios Martínez (born 1 October 1965) is a Spanish politician and diplomat who is currently the Ambassador to Italy.

He has also been Spain's ambassador to the Democratic Republic of the Congo and Ethiopia, with concurrence also in the Seychelles and Djibouti, and was Ambassador of Spain to NATO.

== Early life ==
Fernández-Palacios was born on 1 October 1965, in Las Palmas de Gran Canaria.

He completed his primary and secondary studies at the Colegio Oficial Alemán in Las Palmas de Gran Canaria and later graduated in law at the Complutense University of Madrid, where he completed his Doctorate in Law. He also obtained a diploma in European Relations from the Catholic Institute of Paris.

== Career ==
In his early diplomatic career, Fernández-Palacios was assigned to the Spanish diplomatic missions in Algiers, The Hague, and Tegucigalpa.

Fernández-Palacios has been head of the United Nations and Western Europe area at the Ministry of Foreign Affairs, and advisor for International Affairs to the Ministry of Defence. In June 2005, he was appointed director of the cabinet of the defense minister.

In 2006, Fernández-Palacios was appointed ambassador of Spain in the Democratic Republic of the Congo.

In 2008, Fernández-Palacios was General Director of the Cabinet of the President of the Congress of Deputies, José Bono.

From 2011 to 2015, Fernández-Palacios was Ambassador of Spain in Ethiopia, Djibouti and Seychelles, as well as Permanent Representative Observer to the African Union.

In March 2007, the diplomatic staff of the Spanish Embassy in Kinshasa was evacuated after the headquarters was hit by a shell. Fernández-Palacios and the rest of the officials were evicted in tanks by Uruguayan soldiers from the UN mission, amid a hail of gunfire. The evacuees were sheltered in a building under the United Nations flag.

Fernández-Palacios held the position of Counselor for Parliamentary Affairs in the Permanent Representation of Spain to the European Union.

In September 2018, Fernández-Palacios became the ambassador to NATO.
