= Ambassador of Spain to Central America =

The ambassador of Spain to Central America was a diplomatic position within the Spanish Ministry of State (today Ministry of Foreign Affairs) that, from 1850 to 1936, managed the diplomatic relations between the Kingdom of Spain and the republics of Central America: Costa Rica, El Salvador, Guatemala, Honduras and Nicaragua. The Spanish Legation to Central America had its headquarters in Guatemala City and was assisted by several consulates. Until the mid-1890s, this diplomat was accredited as resident minister to Guatemala and chargé d'affaires to the rest of the republics.

== Background ==
After the dissolution of the Federal Republic of Central America, Spain first recognized the independence of Costa Rica and Nicaragua, signing treaties with both nations in 1850. Guatemala and El Salvador came next, with diplomatic agreements in 1863 and 1865, respectively. Honduras was the last country of Central America to establish diplomatic relations with Spain. Both countries signed a friendship treaty in 1887, however, this treaty was never ratified. Diplomatic relations were finally established in 1894.

Despite the Spanish effort to reinforce the links between countries, the trade and exchange of citizens were limited, with no major trade routes and no large groups of Spanish residents in the area. This probably explains why, in order not to unnecessarily abuse the ministry's budget, a single legation was created for all of Central America.

The Legation in Guatemala also had a consulate in Guatemala City and several honorary vice-consuls in the rest of countries of the area. New honorary consulates were founded in 1890, located in San José, Costa Rica and Tegucigalpa, Honduras. In 1894, the consulate in San Jose was elevated in rank, becoming staffed by a career civil servant.

From the beginning of the 20th century, Spain strengthened diplomatic relations with these countries and created independent legations in each republic, with El Salvador becoming responsible also for Honduras and Nicaragua. After losing most of its jurisdictions, since 1936 the Legation in Guatemala City has served as Embassy to Guatemala.

== List of ambassadors to Central America ==
This list was compiled using the work "History of the Spanish Diplomacy" by the Spanish historian and diplomat Miguel Ángel Ochoa Brun.

Name	Rank	Term
Diego Ramón de la Quadra	Chargé d'affaires	1851–1854
Facundo Goñi	Chargé d'affaires	1854–1856
José de Zambrano	Chargé d'affaires	1856–1857
Melitón Luján	Chargé d'affaires	1865
Francisco Javier Losada y Melgarejo	Chargé d'affaires	1864–1867
Manuel Llorente y Vázquez	Minister	1883
Melchor Ordóñez y Ortega	Minister	1883–1887
Enrique Dupuy de Lôme	Minister	1887–1888
Antonio de Castro y Casaléiz	Chargé d'affaires	1887–1889
Julio de Arellano y Arróspide	Minister	1888–1895
Felipe García-Ontiveros y Serrano	Minister	1895–1900
Manuel Pastor y Bedoya	Minister	1900–1901
Eduardo Bosch y Barrau	Minister	1901
Pedro Carrere y Lembeye	Minister	1901–1907
Manuel García y Jove	Minister	1907–1910
Tomás de Rueda y Osborne, Viscoust of Fuente de Doña María	Minister	1911–1916
Francisco Agramonte Cortijo	Chargé d'affaires	1916–1917
Ginés Vidal y Saura	Minister	1917–1919
Pedro Quartín y del Saz Caballero	Minister	1917–1925
Manuel García de Acilu	Minister	1925–1929
Rafael de Ureña y Sanz	Minister	1929–1936
Buenaventura Caro y del Arroyo	Minister	1936
Pablo de Jaurrieta y Múzquiz	Minister	1936
Francisco López Escobar	Chargé d'affaires	1936

== See also ==
- List of Spanish ambassadors to: Costa Rica, El Salvador, Guatemala, Honduras and Nicaragua.

== Bibliography ==
- Sánchez Andrés, Agustín (2016). "La normalización de las relaciones entre España y Centroamérica durante la gestión de Julio de Arellano y Arróspide, 1889-1895" [The normalization of relations between Spain and Central America during the administration of Julio de Arellano y Arróspide, 1889–1895]. Revista complutense de historia de América (in Spanish). 42 (42): 243–266. doi:10.5209/RCHA.53718. ISSN 1132-8312.
