= Ignacio Rupérez =

Ignacio Rupérez Rubio (17 October 1943 – 25 December 2015) was a Spanish diplomat, journalist, and writer. Rupérez was appointed Ambassador to Iraq on 3 June 2005, becoming the first Ambassador to Iraq since 1991, when the Spanish embassy in Baghdad was closed during the Gulf War. He served as Ambassador to Iraq from 2005 until 2008. He was later appointed Ambassador to Honduras. Rupérez was the brother of Javier Rupérez, a diplomat and politician.

Rupérez began his career as a newspaper journalist, including ABC and El País. He became a Spanish diplomat in 1980. His first diplomatic posting was to Cairo, Egypt. He transferred to Tel Aviv, Israel, which had recently established diplomatic relations with Spain, in 1986. Rupérez was next posted to the Embassy of Spain in Havana, Cuba, from 1989 to 1992. He was then sent to Kyiv, Ukraine, as a deputy in 1992.

Ignacio Rupérez was posted to the Spanish diplomatic mission in Iraq by the government of José María Aznar in 1997. Spain had closed its embassy and recalled its ambassador in 1991 during the first Gulf War. Since there was no ambassador, Ruperez was posted as chargé d'affaires until 2000.

He became the Vice President of the Comité Hispano-Americano in 2003.

On 3 June 2005 Ignacio Rupérez was appointed Ambassador to Iraq, becoming the first Spanish ambassador since 1991. He served as Ambassador from 2005 to 2008. In a 2008 interview with El País, Rupérez called the situation in Iraq and the Iraq War "more complicated than Vietnam." He later published his book, "Collateral Damage," in which he criticized the 2003 invasion of Iraq.

Rupérez was next appointed Ambassador to Honduras in 2009. However, then President Manuel Zelaya was ousted in a coup d'état during the 2009 Honduran constitutional crisis shortly before Rupérez was scheduled to arrive in the country. The government of Prime Minister José Luis Rodríguez Zapatero criticized Zelaya's ouster. As a result, Rupérez was denied entry into Honduras by the new Honduran government. Instead, Rupérez spent the first fourteen months of his Ambassadorship to Honduras stationed at the Spanish Embassy in neighboring El Salvador. He was finally allowed into Honduras when relations between the two countries improved.

Most recently, Rupérez has served as Ambassador-at-large for Muslim Communities and Organizations Abroad.

Ignacio Rupérez died at a hospital in Madrid on 25 December 2015 at the age of 72, following a long illness.
