= Susana Sumelzo =

Spanish politician (born 1969)

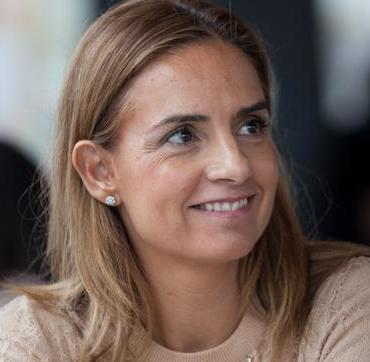

Secretary of State for Ibero-America
- Incumbent
- Assumed office 20 December 2023
- Preceded by: Juan Fernández Trigo

Member of the Congress of Deputies
- In office 13 December 2011 – 11 January 2024
- Constituency: Zaragoza

Senator for Zaragoza
- In office 9 March 2008 – 12 December 2011

Personal details
- Born: 22 December 1969 (age 56) Zaragoza, Spain
- Party: Spanish Socialist Workers' Party (since 1990)
- Occupation: Lawyer, politician

Susana Sumelzo Jordán (born 1969) is a Spanish politician of the Spanish Socialist Workers' Party (PSOE) who has been serving as Secretary of State for Ibero-America since 2023. Previously, she served as member of the Congress of Deputies from 2011 to 2024, representing the province of Zaragoza.

== Early life and career ==
Born on 22 December 1969 in Zaragoza, Sumelzo graduated in law at the University of Zaragoza. She later worked for a time at a law firm, as well as an eight-year spell at the Provincial Deputation of Zaragoza.

== Political career ==
=== Early beginnings ===
Sumelzo joined the Spanish Socialist Workers' Party (PSOE) in 1990, when she was 20 years old. She ran as PSOE senatorial candidate for the province of Zaragoza vis-à-vis the 2008 general election; Sumelzo was elected and she served as member of the Upper House for its 8th term integrated within the Socialist Parliamentary Group.

=== Member of Parliament ===
Regarding the 2011 general election, she ran in the PSOE list for Zaragoza for the Congress of Deputies. She was elected, and she has renovated her seat at the 2015, 2016, and 2019 general elections. She was one of the 15 MPs of the Socialist Parliamentary Group who, in October 2016, broke party discipline and refused to abstain in the investiture vote of Mariano Rajoy, voting against instead. Once Pedro Sánchez made a comeback to party leadership, Sumelzo joined the PSOE's Federal Executive Board in June 2017, charged with responsibilities at the Area of Municipal Politics.

Following the 28 April 2019 general election, Sumelzo was elected to chair the Joint Congress-Senate Committee on the European Union on 30 July 2019.

In addition to her committee assignments, Sumelzo has been a member of the Spanish delegation to the Parliamentary Assembly of the Council of Europe (PACE) since 2019. In the Assembly, she has served on the Committee on Political Affairs and Democracy (since 2022); the Sub-Committee on Democracy (since 2022); the Sub-Committee on the Europe Prize (since 2020); the Sub-Committee on the European Social Charter (since 2020); the Sub-Committee on Children (2020–2022); the Committee on Social Affairs, Health and Sustainable Development (2019–2022); and the Sub-Committee on Gender Equality (2020–2021).

=== Secretary of State for Ibero-America ===
In December 2023, she was appointed Secretary of State for Ibero-America.
