= Ethiopia–Poland relations =

Bilateral relations

- Ethiopia: Poland

Diplomatic mission
- Embassy of Ethiopia, Berlin: Embassy of Poland, Addis Ababa

Envoy
- Ambassador of Ethiopia in Poland Mulu Solomon: Ambassador of Poland in Ethiopia

Ethiopia–Poland relations are the bilateral relations between Ethiopia and Poland.

Economic ties between Poland and Ethiopia have yet to fully develop, with Ethiopia currently ranked as Poland's 114th trade partner as of 2020.

== History ==
In the 1680s, Polish King John III Sobieski attempted to establish relations and an alliance with Ethiopia for it to join the Great Turkish War against the Ottoman Empire.

Poland–Ethiopia relations began in the early 1930s when the first Polish chargé d'affaires Juliusz Dzieduszycki arrived in Addis Ababa to attend Haile Selassie's coronation. Shortly thereafter, the Ethiopian envoy in Paris made the first official visit to Poland. In 1934, the two countries signed the Treaty of Friendship, Trade, and Settlement, ratified by Poland in 1935, It was thwarted by the Italian invasion that followed.

In 1946, the Ethiopian legation in Cairo proposed a restoration of diplomatic relations. On October 3, 1947, Zygmunt Kuligowski, the Special Envoy and Minister Plenipotentiary, presented his credentials to Selassie. During this time, the Ethiopian envoy in Moscow received his credentials in Warsaw. From 1947 to 1960, bilateral relations were minimal with sporadic interactions. In 1960, the Polish Legation and the Office of Commercial Counselor began operating in Addis Ababa. A year later, in 1961, diplomatic missions between Poland and Ethiopia were elevated to the rank of embassies in Addis Ababa and Moscow.

Polish Embassy in Addis Ababa in 1966

Significant progress was made in September 1963 when Haile Selassie was awarded the Grand Cross of the Order of the Rebirth of Poland (Polonia Restituta) during his visit, which also led to the signing of treaties, one on Cultural Cooperation and another on Scientific and Technical Cooperation. Poland provided subsidies for Ethiopian students and dispatched experts to assist Ethiopia.

Following the Ethiopian Revolution and the rise of the Derg to power in 1974, Poland recognized the new authorities. Since then, the two countries strengthened their relations through reciprocal visits by representatives and the signing of agreements covering trade, aviation, loans, culture, and media. Notably, the number of Ethiopian scholars in Poland has significantly increased during this time. In 1985–1987, the Polish Relief Helicopter Squadron took part in a relief operation in response to the 1983–1985 famine in Ethiopia.

=== 1989–present ===
In 1992, the Polish Embassy in Ethiopia was closed due to budget cuts, and its responsibilities were transferred to the Polish Embassy in Yemen. The Embassy reopened in 2003. In 2000–2001, a Polish Military Contingent took part in the United Nations Mission in Ethiopia and Eritrea.

A double tax avoidance agreement was signed between the two countries in Addis Ababa in 2015.

In May 2017, Polish President Andrzej Duda made an official visit to Ethiopia, marking the first visit to Sub-Saharan Africa by a Polish president. President Duda held consultations with Ethiopian President Mulatu Teshome and Prime Minister Hailemariam Desalegn to discuss political and economic cooperation between the two countries.

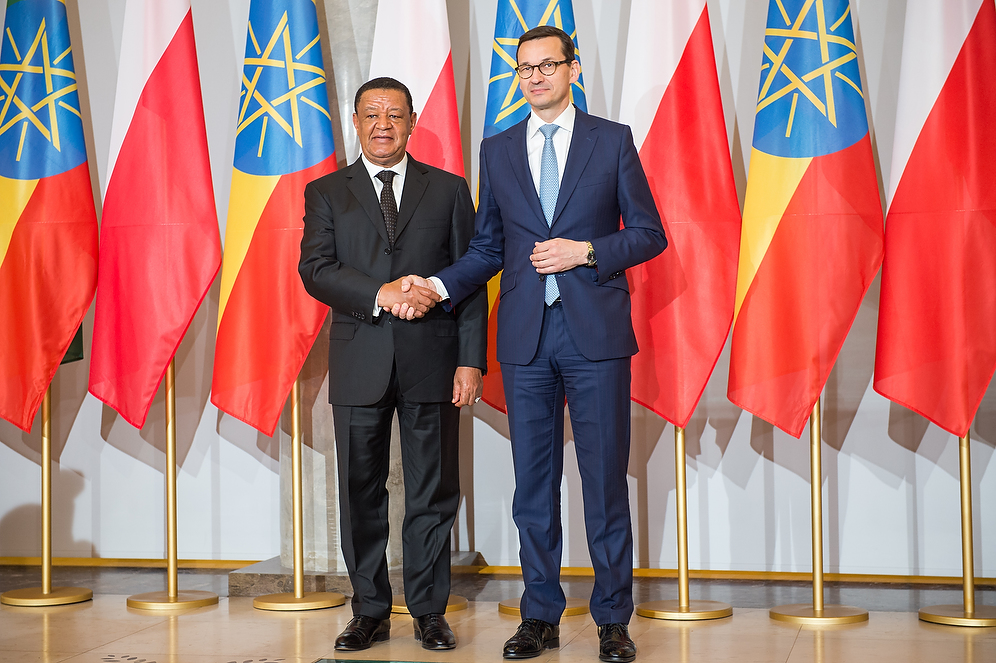
Ethiopian President Mulatu Teshome met with Polish Polish Prime Minister Mateusz Morawiecki in April 2018

In April 2018, Ethiopian President Teshome visited Poland and met with President Duda and Prime Minister Mateusz Morawiecki. During the visit, representatives from the Polish and Ethiopian Ministries of Foreign Affairs held consultations, and both countries sat together in the UN Security Council.

== Economic relations ==
Economic relations between the two countries are relatively small. As of 2020, Ethiopia was 114th partner in foreign trade turnover, with exports from Poland reached 2,585 million USD, while the import from Ethiopia reached 1,088 million USD. All imports from Ethiopia to Poland are duty-free and quota-free, with the exception of armaments, as part of the Everything but Arms initiative of the European Union.

== Education ==
In 2021 and 2022, there were nearly 1,000 students from Ethiopia at Polish higher education institutions, forming the 15th largest group of foreign students in Poland in 2021, and the 16th largest in 2022, at the same time being one of the largest groups from Africa.

== Diplomatic missions ==
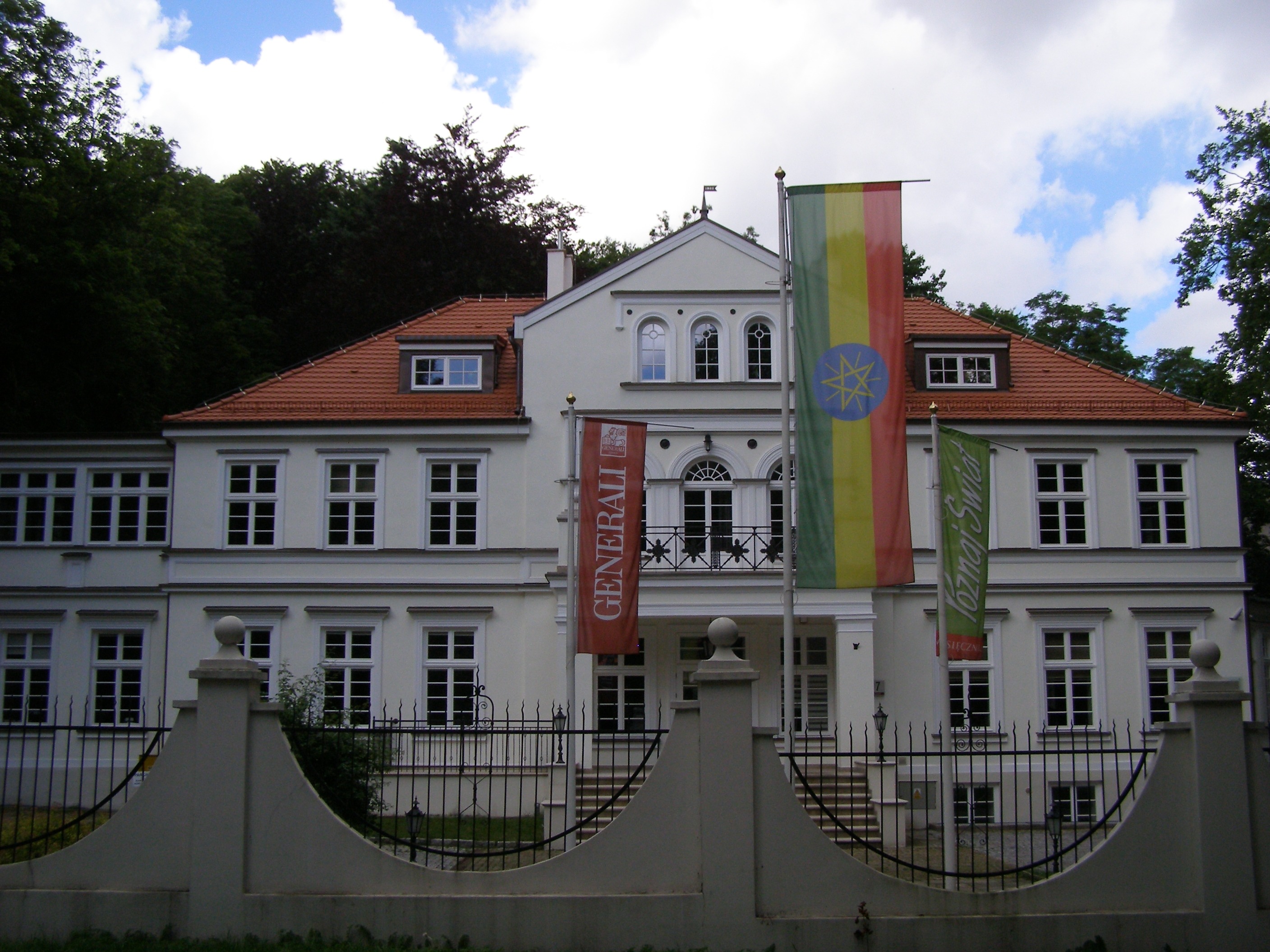
Honorary Consulate of Ethiopia in Gdańsk

- Ethiopia is accredited to Poland from its embassy in Berlin, and there is an honorary consulate of Ethiopia in Gdańsk.
- Poland has an embassy in Addis Ababa.
