= Soraya Rodríguez =

Spanish lawyer and politician

Maria Soraya Rodriguez Ramos
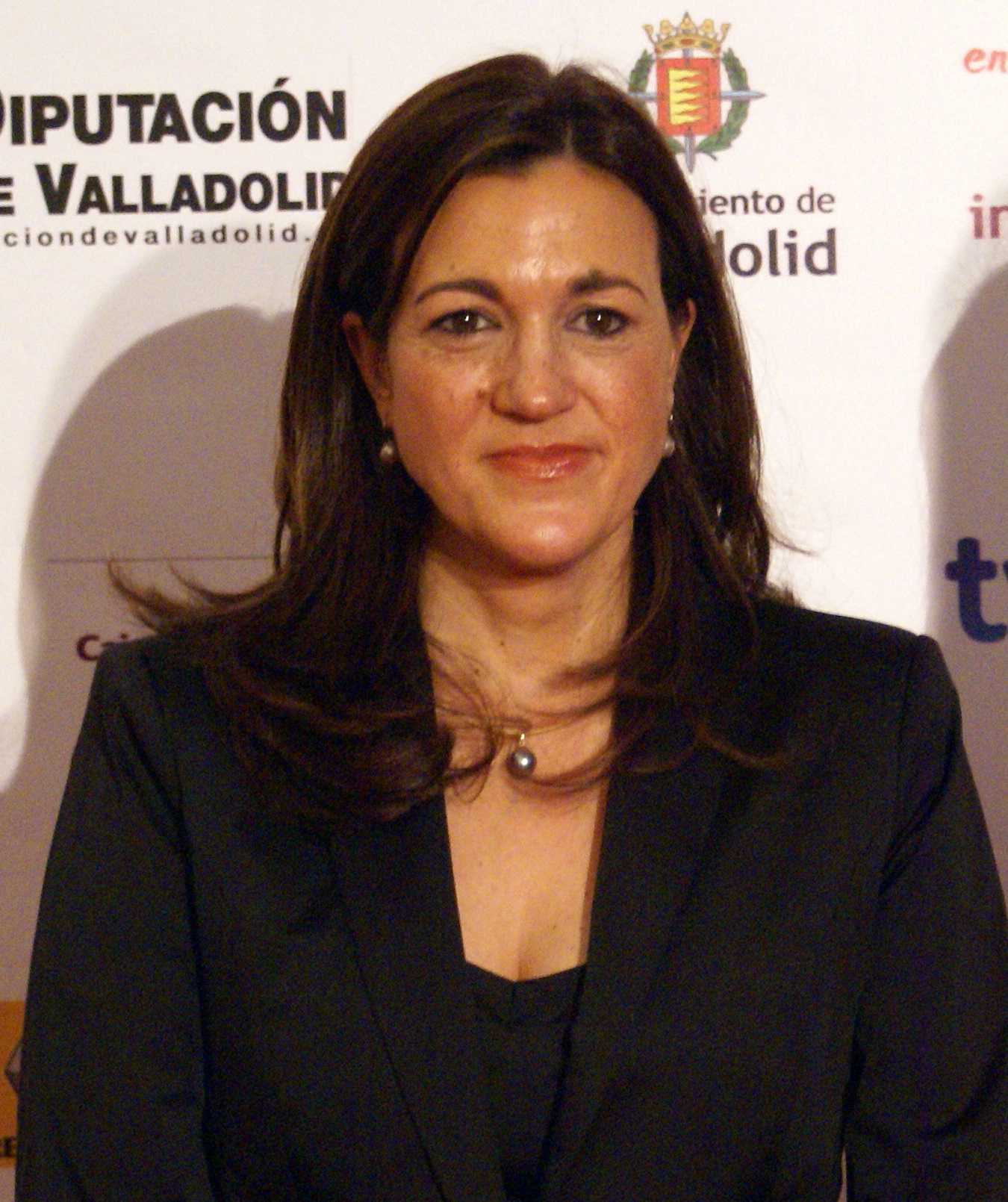

Personal details
- Born: 1 December 1963 (age 62) Valladolid, Spain
- Education: Universidad de Valladolid
- Occupation: Lawyer and politician

María Soraya Rodríguez Ramos (pronounced [soˈɾaʝa roˈðɾiɣeθ]; born 1 December 1963) is a Spanish lawyer and politician who has been serving as a Member of the European Parliament for Ciudadanos since 2019. She previously was a Deputy of the PSOE in the Congress of Deputies.

== Early life and education ==
Born in Valladolid, Rodríguez graduated with her law degree from the University of Valladolid, with a specialization in Community Law, in 1987. Between 1988 and 1990 she worked as a lawyer at the Center for the Reception of Women Victims of Ill-treatment in Valladolid. She was Secretary of Social Movements and Citizen Participation in the Regional Executive of the PSOE in Castile and Leon. Later, in 1991 she was professor of the University School of Labor Relations of Valladolid. Between 1994 and 1997 she was director of the Center for Women in the city of Valladolid. In 1998, she served as legal advisor to the Local Administration.

== Political career ==
=== Career in national politics ===
In 1994, as a member of the PSOE, Rodríguez was named the Secretary of Organization in the Provincial Executive of the Party in Valladolid. She was later a member of the Federal Committee of the PSOE between 2000 and 2008. In the general elections of 2004 Rodríguez won a seat in the Parliament representing Valladolid. In the municipal elections of 2007, she ran as the PSOE candidate to the mayoralty of Valladolid, but was defeated by the candidate of the Popular Party.

Between 2007 and 2008 Rodríguez was the spokeswoman of the socialist municipal group in the City Council of Valladolid. In the general elections of 2008 she was re-elected as a national deputy in Valladolid and was second consecutive legislature, being number two in the list, after Jesus Quijano. In July 2008, on the proposal of President José Luis Rodríguez Zapatero, she left her seat and position as president of the municipal group of the PSOE in Valladolid to become Secretary of State for International Cooperation, replacing Leire Pajin. In the municipality of Valladolid, she was replaced by Óscar Puente.

In the 2011 national elections Rodríguez topped the list of PSOE by the Province of Valladolid, accompanied by the provincial secretary Mario Bedera, obtaining 2 seats against the 3 of the PP. After the 38th Congress of the PSOE in which Alfredo Perez Rubalcaba was elected general secretary, she was appointed spokesman for the socialist group in the Congress of Deputies, a position she held until September 2014.

=== Member of the European Parliament, 2019–present ===
Since the 2019 European elections, Rodríguez has been serving as a member of the Renew Europe for Ciudadanos on the European Parliament’s Committee on the Environment, Public Health and Food Safety and the Committee on Women's Rights and Gender Equality. She is also a member of the European Parliament Intergroup on Climate Change, Biodiversity and Sustainable Development, the European Parliament Intergroup on LGBT Rights and the MEPs Against Cancer group.

== Positions held ==
- Secretary of State for International Cooperation (2008-2011)
- Member of the Permanent Deputation (2012–2014)
- Alternate Member of the Permanent Deputation (2014–2016)
- Spokesperson for the Board of Spokespersons (2012–2014)
- Member of the Committee on Foreign Affairs (2014–2015)
- Member of the Committee on Foreign Affairs (2012)
- Joined the Committee on Foreign Affairs (2014)
- Spokesman for the Justice Commission (2015)
- Second Vice-President of the Justice Commission (2014–2015)
- Member of the Justice Commission (2014–2014)
- Member of the Regulations Committee (2012–2014)
- Member of the Commission for the control of appropriations for expenditure booked (2012–2014)
- Spokesman for the Commission for the Study of Climate Change (2014)
- Speaker of the Conference Proy. LO on privileges and Immunities States (121/162) (2015)
- Speaker of the Conference Proy. L. member status of Spain in Eurojust (121/135) (2015)
- Speaker of the Lecture Proy.L. Mod. Criminal Enforcement Act (121/138) (2015)
- Member of the Spanish Delegation to the Parliamentary Assembly of the Council of Europe (2014–2016)
- Member of the Spanish Delegation to the Parliamentary Assembly of the Union for the Mediterranean (2012–2014)

== Personal life ==
Rodríguez is divorced and has two children.

== See also ==
- Politics of Spain
