= Miguel Ángel Cortés Martín =

Spanish politician (born 1958)

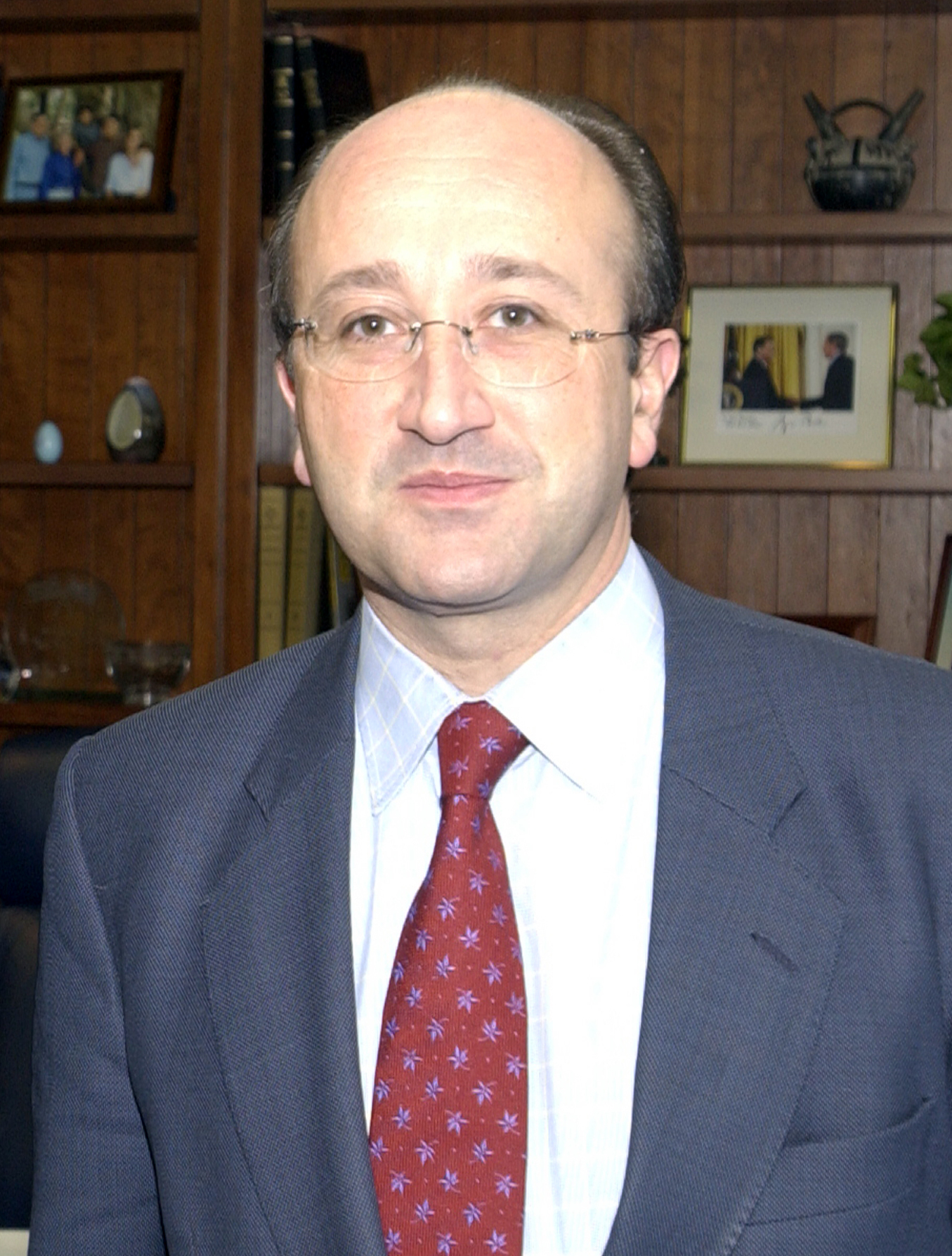
Cortés in 2003

Miguel Ángel Cortés Martín (Valladolid, Spain, 14 July 1958) is a Spanish politician who belongs to the main opposition People's Party (PP).

Single with two children, Cortés graduated in law at the University of Valladolid and subsequently worked as a lawyer. He served as a local councillor in his hometown of Valladolid. He then served as a regional procurator and PP spokesman in the Parliament of Castille and Leon. An associate of future Prime Minister Jose Maria Aznar, with Aznar he quit regional Castilian politics in 1989 in order to enter national politics. At the 1989 General Election he was elected to the Spanish Congress of Deputies representing Valladolid Province. He was re-elected at the subsequent elections in 1993, 1996, 2000, 2004 and 2008. At both the 2004 and 2008 elections he headed the PP list in a district where the PP and predecessors had won at least two seats since 1982, effectively guaranteeing him a seat. Between 2000 and 2004 he served as the 6th Secretary of State for International Cooperation and Ibero-America of the Government of Spain.

In Congress he has served as PP spokesman on Information Technologies. He has also served as a member of the Foundation for Analysis and Social Studies.
