= List of ambassadors of Spain to El Salvador =

Ambassador of Spain to El Salvador
- Coat of arms of Spain
- Incumbent; Sonia Isabel Álvarez Cibanal since 31 July 2024
- Ministry of Foreign Affairs; Secretariat of State for Ibero-America
- Style: The Most Excellent
- Residence: San Salvador
- Nominator: The Foreign Minister
- Appointer: The Monarch
- Term length: At the government's pleasure
- Precursor: Ambassador of Spain to Central America
- Inaugural holder: Juan Gómez de Molina y Elío
- Formation: 1950
- Website: Mission of Spain to El Salvador

The ambassador of Spain to El Salvador is the official representative of the Kingdom of Spain to the Republic of El Salvador. Through this embassy, Spain acts as observer of the Central American Integration System and it supports its actions with the Spain-SICA Found, created in 2006.

Spain sent is first diplomatic representatives to Central America in the 1850s, with a unique ambassador to the whole region. The ambassador to Central America was responsible for establishing diplomatic relations with the newly formed republics of the region. In the case of El Salvador, both countries signed a treaty of peace, friendship, and recognition in 1865.

Since 1914, a chargé d'affaires was seated in San Salvador. This position was elevated to minister in 1929 and to ambassador in 1950. The minister to El Salvador also represented Spain in Nicaragua (1920–1939), Honduras (1943–1948) and Cuba (1946).

== List of ambassadors to El Salvador (1914–present) ==
This list was compiled using the work "History of the Spanish Diplomacy" by the Spanish historian and diplomat Miguel Ángel Ochoa Brun. The work covers up to the year 2000, so the rest is based on appointments published in the Boletín Oficial del Estado.

Name	Rank	Term
Ricardo Spottorno y Sandoval	Chargé d'affaires	1914
Luis de Pedroso y Madán, Count of San Esteban de Cañongo	Chargé d'affaires	1914
Manuel Gutiérrez	Chargé d'affaires	1916–1918
Fernando Gómez Caballero	Chargé d'affaires	1917
Fernando Alcalá-Galiano y Smith	Chargé d'affaires	1918–1919
Vicente González Arnao y Amar de la Torre	Chargé d'affaires	1919–1921
Manuel Travesedo y Silvela	Chargé d'affaires	1921–1922
Ángel Donesteve y Pérez de Castro	Chargé d'affaires	1922–1928
Juan Gómez de Molina y Elío, Marquess of Fontana	Chargé d'affaires	1928
Carlos de Miranda y Quartín, Count of Casa Miranda	Chargé d'affaires	1928–1929
Carlos de Sostoa y Sthamer	Minister	1929–1930
Felipe García-Ontiveros y Laplana	Minister	1930–1931
Pedro Sebastián de Erice	Minister	1931–1932
Fernando González-Arnao y Norzagaray	Minister	1932–1936
Diego Buigas Ortuño	Chargé d'affaires	1936–1937
José Cavero-Bailén y Goicorrotea, Duke of Bailén	Minister	1937–1943
Julio Palencia Tubau	Minister	1943–1944
José Cavero-Bailén y Goicorrotea, Duke of Bailén	Minister	1944–1945
Juan Manuel de Arístegui y Vidaurre	Minister	1945–1946
Juan Gómez de Molina y Elío, Marquess of Fontana	Minister	1946–1950
Juan Gómez de Molina y Elío, Marquess of Fontana	Ambassador	1950–1954
Miguel Teus y López	Ambassador	1954–1956
Miguel Sáinz de Llanos	Ambassador	1956–1959
Miguel Teus y López	Ambassador	1959–1963
Antonio Cacho Zabalza	Ambassador	1963–1970
Manuel Fuentes Irurozqui	Ambassador	1970–1973
José María Trías de Bés y Borrás	Ambassador	1973–1977
Víctor Sánchez-Mesas y Juste	Ambassador	1977–1980
Luis Mariñas Otero	Ambassador	1980–1986
Fernando Álvarez de Miranda	Ambassador	1986–1989
Francisco Cádiz Deleito	Ambassador	1989–1991
Ricardo Peidró	Ambassador	1991–1995
Arturo Avella Díez del Corral	Ambassador	1995–1998
Andrés Collado González	Ambassador	1998–2001
Juan Francisco Montalbán Carrasco	Ambassador	2001–2004
Jorge Hevia Sierra	Ambassador	2004–2008
José Javier Gómez-Llera	Ambassador	2008–2011
Enrique Ojeda Vila	Ambassador	2011–2012
Francisco José Rábena Barrachina	Ambassador	2012–2017
Federico Torres Muro	Ambassador	2017–2020
Carlos de la Morena Casado	Ambassador	2020–2024
Sonia Álvarez Cibanal	Ambassador	2024–pres.
