= Ethiopia–Germany relations =

Bilateral relations

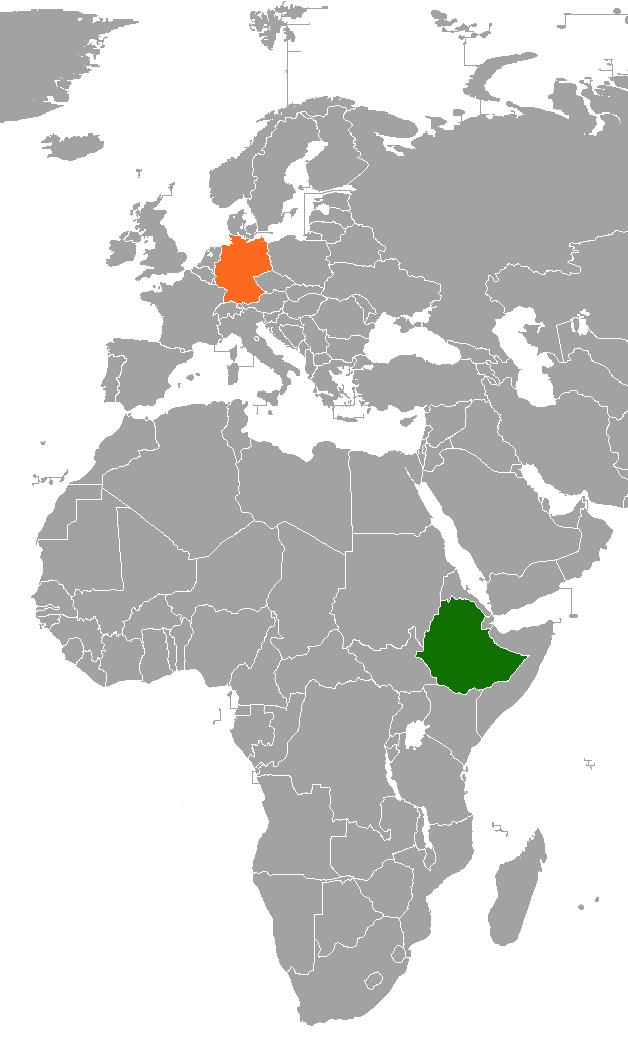

- Ethiopia: Germany

Diplomatic mission
- Embassy of Germany, Addis Ababa: Embassy of Ethiopia, Berlin

Ethiopia–Germany relations are bilateral relations between Ethiopia and Germany. Traditionally, they have had close diplomatic ties characterized by friendly relations. The two countries established their embassies on 7 March 1905, and in 1907 by order of Emperor Menelik II, the German embassy moved to its current site in Addis Ababa. Both enjoyed favored relations and visited each other's countries on numerous occasions. Germany has an embassy in Addis Ababa and Ethiopia has an embassy in Berlin.

== Overview ==
Germany views Ethiopia as one of the most important economic partner for cooperation and development policies. Traditionally, Germany is the largest importer of Ethiopian coffee and many German NGOs are active in Ethiopia.

Culturally, they shared long tradition. Numerous holders such as German Academic Exchange Service (DAAD) and Humboldt among other scholarship have been mediator of both cultures. Addis Ababa has a German school, German-speaking Christian community, the most frequent Goethe-Institut. In addition, Germany's Deutsche Welle is the most popular broadcaster in Ethiopia, primary in the Amharic language. Germany's support of Ethiopia directed through multilateral relations primarily from the European Union, United Nations, World Bank and International Monetary Fund.

== Economic relations ==
Until 2014, Germany was the largest importer of Ethiopian coffee, with 30% exports. Ethiopia's commodities to Germany are mostly food items, textiles and raw material, while Germany exports vehicles, machines, electrical and measuring technology and chemical products. Therefore most machinery products in Ethiopia are made in Germany. Since 2016, German heavy vehicle manufacturer MAN selling dissembled large good vehicles components to a customer in Ethiopia and assembly and training takes in Ethiopia. In 2017, Siemens opened its headquarter to Addis Ababa. In the following year, the Ethiopian Airlines and DHL (minority share) set up joint venture. In late January 2019, Volkswagen signed a Memorandum of Understanding with the Ethiopian Investment Commission.

Cooperation of German and Ethiopian companies are growing faster. In 2007, a bilateral trade protection agreement signed in order to encourage wide-range investment to Ethiopia. There is no German chamber of commerce in Ethiopia as the chamber in Nairobi, Kenya covers in Ethiopia. 20 companies are at operational level, while 12 companies are pending in implementation stage and 9 in pre-implementation level. In 2017, value of Ethiopia's export to Germany estimated 248 million dollars while Germany exports was 201 million.

In September 2014, a Summary Record of the Negotiations on Development Cooperation between the Ethiopian and German government was signed. On 24 June 2019, they have Joint Ministerial Council.

All imports from Ethiopia to Germany are duty-free and quota-free, with the exception of armaments, as part of the Everything but Arms initiative of the European Union.

== Military relations ==
During the Second Italo-Ethiopian War, Nazi Germany was the first country to supply arms and munitions to the Ethiopian Arbegnoch resistance unit against Italy due Rome's objection to the absorption of Austria into Germany. This caused Italian resources to weaken into prolonged war, and economic dependence on Germany led to Italy's abandoning support for Austria, leading to Hitler's Anschluss in 1938.

Amid the Tigray War in November 2020, the German Military Attaché, Colonel Thomas Roberling visited Hurso contingent center in Somali Region, to build military cooperation between the two countries.

== List of visits ==
=== From Germany side ===
- President Roman Herzog (1996)
- Chancellor Gerhard Shroder (2004)
- President Horst Köhler (2004)
- President Frank-Walter Steinmeier (2018)
- Angela Merkel (2007 and 2016)
- Parliamentary Delegation (2011)
- President Joachim Gauck (2013)
- Federal Minister for Agriculture and Consumer Protection (2013)
- Foreign Minister Frank-Walter Steinmeier (2019)
- Parliamentary Undersecretary Thomas Silberhorn (2014)
- German Parliament Group (Bundestag) East African group (2016)

=== From Ethiopia side ===
- Prime Minister Meles Zenawi (2002)
- Meles Zenawi (2004)
- Meles Zenawi for the G-7 meeting (2007)
- President Girma Wolde-Giorgis ( 2008)
- Prime Minister Hailemariam Desalegn (2014)
- Prime Minister Abiy Ahmed (2018)

== Resident diplomatic missions ==
- Ethiopia has an embassy in Berlin.
- Germany has an embassy in Addis Ababa.
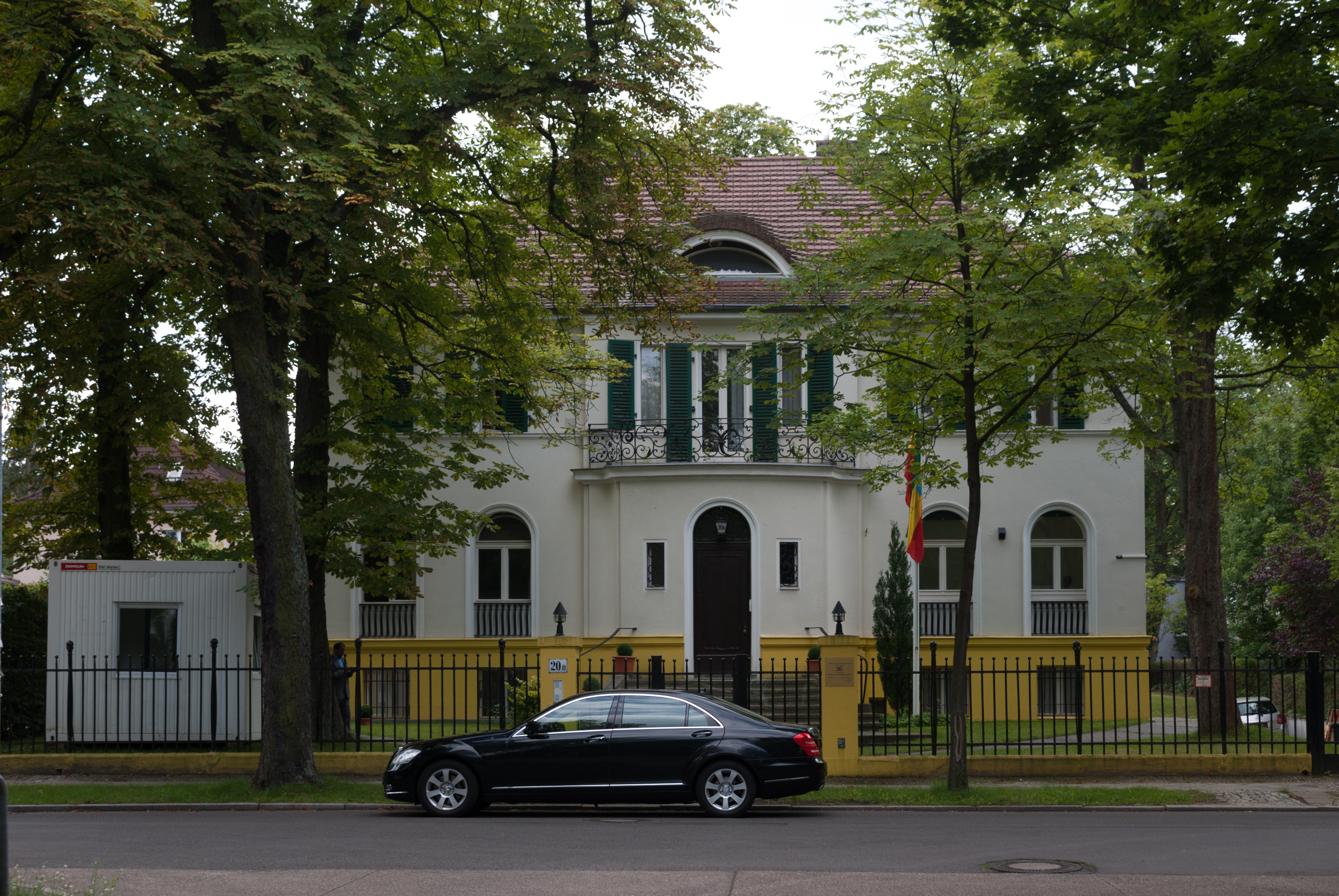
Embassy of Ethiopia in Berlin

== See also ==
- Foreign relations of Ethiopia
- Foreign relations of Germany
