= Secretary of State for International Cooperation =

- Secretario de Estado de Cooperación Internacional
- Coat of Arms used by the Government

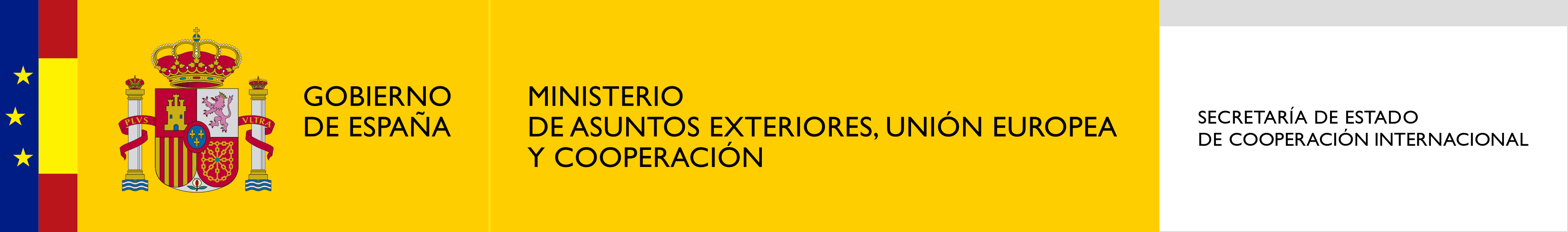

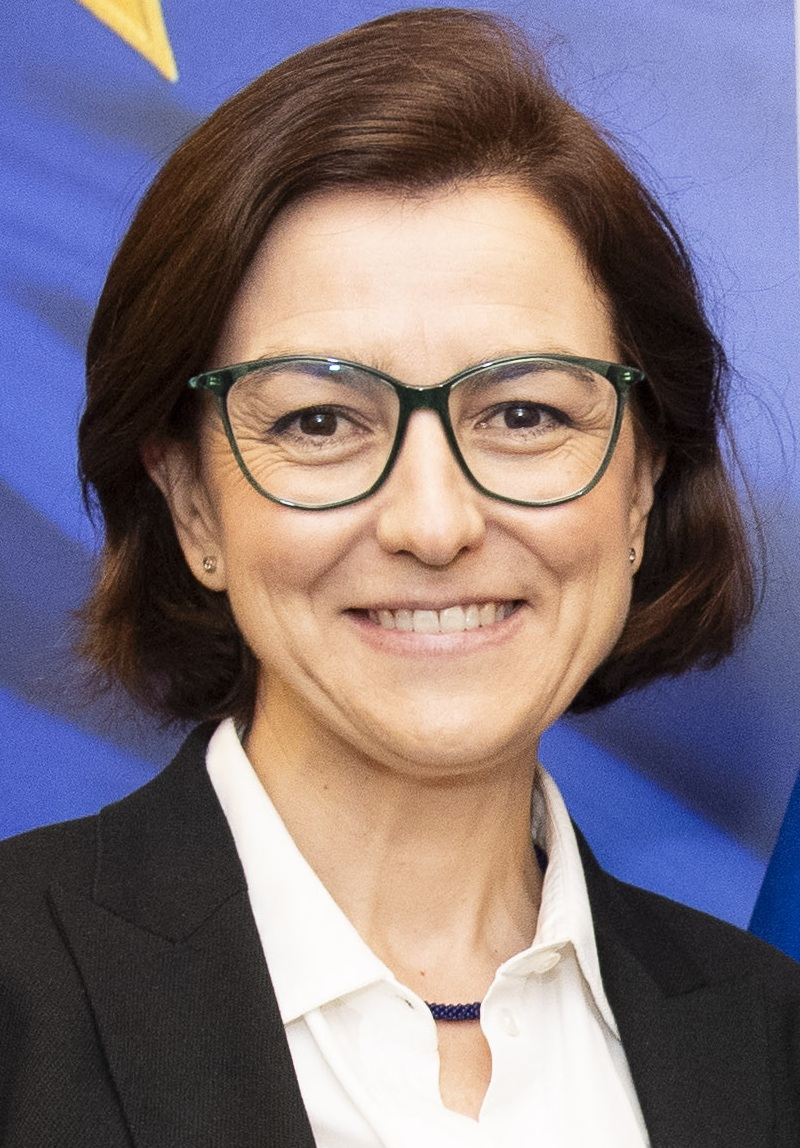
- Incumbent; Eva Granados since December 6, 2023
- Ministry of Foreign Affairs; Secretariat of State for International Cooperation
- Style: The Most Excellent (formal); Mr/Ms. Secretary of State (informal)
- Abbreviation: SECIPIC
- Reports to: The Foreign Minister
- Nominator: The Foreign Minister
- Appointer: The Monarch
- Formation: August 29, 1985
- First holder: Luis Yáñez-Barnuevo
- Website: exteriores.gob.es

The secretary of state for international cooperation (SECI) is a senior minister of the Spanish Ministry of Foreign Affairs responsible for the international cooperation for development and humanitarian aid policies—especially focused on Latin America and Africa.

The SECI is appointed by the monarch on the advice of the foreign minister and, as the highest official in charge of the Spanish international cooperation, the SECI is also the president of the Spanish Agency for International Development Cooperation (AECID).

== History ==
The international cooperation and development policy of Spain exists since the dictatorship of Francisco Franco and the relations with Latin America since the independence of their current states.

During the first years of democracy, the competences over this matters were attached to bodies with the rank of directorate-general or less, however, during the premiership of Felipe González in 1985 the current Secretariat of State was established, with the aim to get an "effective cooperation with all the peoples of the Earth", a mandate collected in the preamble of the Spanish Constitution (Constitution § Preamble).

Although international cooperation for development is destined for countries around the world, due to historical and cultural ties most of this Spanish cooperation goes to Latin America and the former Spanish territories of Africa like Equatorial Guinea, Morocco or Western Sahara, and also to Asian countries such as the Philippines, also former Spanish territories.

The most significant change since its creation was in 2004, when the competencies of the foreign policy of Spain in Ibero-American were transferred to the Secretariat of State for Foreign Affairs, competences that were recovered in very late 2011.

In 2017 the name was extended to include the Caribbean in the denomination in order to target the objective of at-that-time Foreign Minister Alfonso Dastis to impulse the relations with that geographical area. In 2020, the Secretariat of State lost is responsibilities over Ibero-American affairs.

In 2023, the Cortes Generales approved a new International Cooperation Law that strengthened the policy evaluation system, creating an independent office for this purpose.

=== Name ===
- Secretary of State for International Cooperation and for Ibero-America (1985-2004)
- Secretary of State for International Cooperation (2004-2011)
- Secretary of State for International Cooperation and for Ibero-America (2011-2017)
- Secretary of State for International Cooperation and for Ibero-America and the Caribbean (2017–2020)
- Secretary of State for International Cooperation (2020–present)

== Organization ==
The Secretariat of State is divided in two departments:

- The Directorate-General for Sustainable Development Policies.

It is the agency responsible for the implementation of the Spanish International Cooperation and Development Plan respecting the framework established by the Sustainable Development Goals of the United Nations and coordinating the different public administrations. It is also responsible for Spain's participation in the international meetings about its competences (particularly of the European Union but also with the UN, G20, OECD, among others) and the negotiation of international treaties about this matter.
It is divided in three departments:

The Deputy Directorate-General for Planning and Policy Coherence.
The Deputy Directorate-General for Multilateral and European Development Policies.
The Division for Evaluation of Policies for Development and Knowledge Management.

- The Spanish Cooperation Evaluation Office (OECE), with the rank of deputy directorate-general, an independent agency under the oversight of the secretary of state whose purpose is to carry out independent evaluations on cooperation policies and its bodies, regardless of their affiliation or administrative level.

=== Agencies ===
The Secretariat of State has two government agencies:

- The Spanish Agency for International Development Cooperation (AECID), chaired by the secretary of state.
- The Royal Academy of Spain in Rome, formally attached to the under-secretary but functionally to the secretary of state for international cooperation.

== List of secretaries of state ==
1. Luis Yáñez-Barnuevo (August 30, 1985 – April 10, 1991)
2. Inocencio Arias (April 10-1991-September 18, 1993)
3. José Luis Dicenta Ballester (September 18, 1993 – December 23, 1995)
4. Miguel Ángel Carriedo Mompín (December 23, 1995 – May 14, 1996)
5. Fernando María Villalonga Campos (May 14, 1996 – May 6, 2000)
6. Miguel Ángel Cortés Martín (May 6, 2000 – April 20, 2004)
7. Leire Pajín (April 20, 2004 – July 12, 2008)
8. Maria Soraya Rodriguez Ramos (July 12, 2008 – December 24, 2011)
9. Jesús Manuel Gracia Aldaz (January 6, 2012 – December 12, 2016)
10. Fernando García Casas (December 12, 2016 – June 23, 2018)
11. Juan Pablo de Laiglesia (June 23, 2018 – February 5, 2020)
12. Ángeles Moreno Bau (February 5, 2020 – July 21, 2021)
13. Pilar Cancela Rodríguez (July 21, 2021 – December 6, 2023)
14. Eva Granados (December 6, 2023 – present)

== See also ==
- Directorate-General for International Cooperation and Development
- European Development Fund
