= Ethiopia–Spain relations =

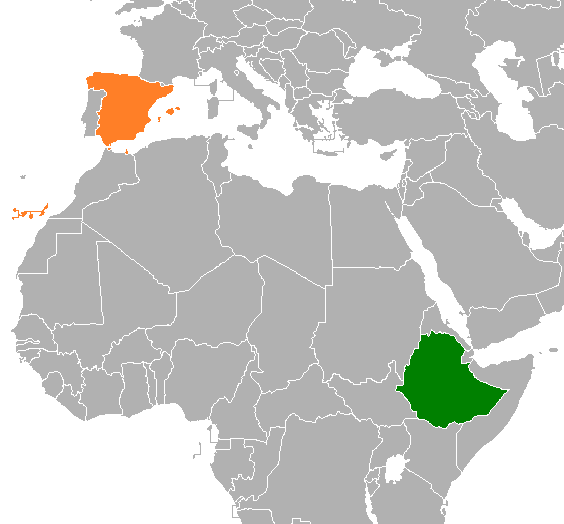

- Ethiopia: Spain

Ethiopia–Spain relations are the bilateral and diplomatic relations between these two countries. Ethiopia has no embassy in Spain, but the Ethiopian embassy in Paris is accredited to Spain. Ethiopia has an honorary consulate in Madrid. Spain has an embassy in Addis Ababa.

== Historical background ==
Contacts between the Iberian Peninsula and Abyssinia date at least to the early Solomonid period. Emperor Wedem Arad in the early 14th century. sent an embassy of which only few traces are recorded, offering an alliance against the Muslims. It was probably following this that Prester John was first located in Ethiopia on a map of 1339 drawn by Angelino Dulcert in Mallorca. In 1427/1428 Emperor Yeshaq I sent envoys with a letter to king Alfonso V of Aragon in Valencia, suggesting a marriage alliance and asking for irrigation experts. In his answer the king proposed a wedding with princess Joana d'Urgell. However, the ambassadors, tasked with this mission never reached Ethiopia, as Alfonso confirmed in a letter to Zara Yaqob in 1450.

In the 16th to 17th century. Spain was again involved in the region, first indirectly through Portugal and then directly during the union with Portugal. A member of the Portuguese expedition of Cristóvão da Gama, Miguel de Castanhoso, was of Spanish origin, as well as a few Jesuit missionaries who worked in Ethiopia (such as Andrés de Oviedo, and the most influential Pedro Paez). Moreover, the Spanish silver dollar, coined in Peru and other Spanish colonies, became the dominant currency in the Indian Ocean and was widely used in the Horn of Africa until the massive import of the Maria Theresa thaler in the 19th century.

In the 19th century, just before the inauguration of the Suez Canal, Spain briefly contemplated some sort of presence in the Horn of Africa. During the reign of Emperor Yohannes IV, Spain initiated a first diplomatic contact with Ethiopia. In 1880, the explorer Juan Victor Abargues de Sostén, a resident in Egypt, was sent by the Real Sociedad Geografica with a letter from Alfonso XII to the Ethiopian King. He aimed at promoting more sympathy for the Catholics in the northern borderlands and inquired into the possibility of commercial contacts and the establishment of a Spanish enclave on the Red Sea coast.

== Diplomatic relations ==
In 1951, Spain established permanent diplomatic relations with Ethiopia. The first Spanish Ambassador was José Luis Florez Estrada, who presented his credentials on 19 September 1962. In 1970 Emperor Haile Selassie went to Spain on a state visit and was received by General Franco. The return visit was paid by the then crown prince Juan Carlos. In 1962 a Spanish Embassy was opened in Addis Abeba. Relations with Ethiopia soured, however, after the Derg took power in 1975. They resumed only in the 1990s and were strongly revitalized in the 2000s.

In March 2004, the Vice Minister AAEE visited Madrid and signed the MOU for cooperation between the two Ministries. Ethiopia was considered a priority Country in the Africa Plan adopted by the Council of Ministers in May 2006. Since then, political relations between the two countries have been consolidated with a regular exchange of high-level visits.

The Spanish Minister of Foreign Affairs visited Ethiopia in 2008, followed by a return visit by his counterpart in 2009. Within the framework of the Spanish policy towards Africa, Ethiopia is considered a High Priority Country; both countries collaborate in the Spanish international initiative Alliance of Civilization and other global initiatives.

The celebration of the African Union Summit at the end of January of each year in Addis Ababa provides the framework for high-level Spanish visits to always have an important bilateral agenda. The visit in 2015 of S.M. King Felipe VI, is an example of the importance that Africa, in general, and Ethiopia, in particular, has for Spain. The King, much loved by the Ethiopian authorities, wanted to thank with his visit the support given by the support of a large number of African countries to the Spanish candidacy for the United Nations Security Council for the biennium 2015–16.

== Economic relations ==
Bilateral economic relations do not yet reflect the potential of both countries. An important milestone in 2014 was the entry into operation of the direct flight Madrid-Addis Ababa, operated by the Ethiopian Airlines Ethiopian flag company.

Ethiopia is one of the African countries with the highest annual growth in recent years. The double-digit economic growth figures achieved in recent years have caused a growing commercial interest in Spain, as evidenced by the increasingly frequent visits of Spanish businessmen to the country. The organization of commercial visits in both directions is also increasing, so that entrepreneurs in both countries could know each other better.

All imports from Ethiopia to Spain are duty-free and quota-free, with the exception of armaments, as part of the Everything but Arms initiative of the European Union.

== Cooperation ==
Ethiopia, the second most populous country on the African continent (94.1 million inhabitants, in 2013), is listed by the Development Assistance Committee (DAC) as a Least Developed Country (WFP), and is ranked 173 in the Index of Human Development 2014 (from a total of 187 countries, according to 2013 data). The country has a GDP of US$1,342 PPP per inhabitant (2011) and its population has a life expectancy of 63.6 years. Ethiopia receives a large volume of ODA, although the trend is decreasing: while in 2010 it represented 11.9% of its GNP (3,525 M $), in 2012 it accounted for approximately 7.6% (3,261 M $) 4.

== Resident diplomatic missions ==
- Ethiopia is accredited to Spain from its embassy in Paris, France.
- Spain has an embassy in Addis Ababa.

== See also ==
- Foreign relations of Ethiopia
- Foreign relations of Spain
