= Ángeles Moreno Bau =

Spanish diplomat

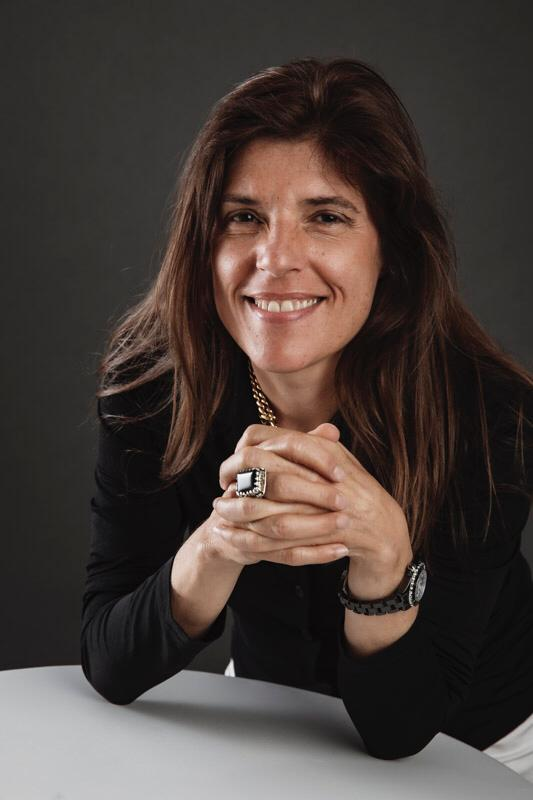

Ambassador of Spain to the United States
- Incumbent
- Assumed office 1 February 2024
- Monarch: Felipe VI
- Preceded by: Santiago Cabanas

Secretary of State for Foreign Affairs
- In office 21 July 2021 – 20 December 2023
- Prime Minister: Pedro Sánchez
- Preceded by: Cristina Gallach
- Succeeded by: Diego Martínez Belío

Secretary of State for International Cooperation
- In office 7 February 2020 – 21 July 2021
- Prime Minister: Pedro Sánchez
- Preceded by: Juan Pablo de Laiglesia
- Succeeded by: Pilar Cancela Rodríguez

Personal details
- Born: 1968 (age 57–58) Madrid, Spain

Ángeles Moreno Bau (born 1968) is a Spanish diplomat who has been serving as ambassador of Spain to the United States since 2024. She is the first woman to serve in this position. Previously, Moreno served as Secretary of State for Foreign Affairs in the second government of Pedro Sánchez from 2021 to 2023 and Secretary of State for International Cooperation from 2020 to 2021.

== Early life and education ==
Born in Madrid in 1968, Moreno earned a licentiate degree in Law from the Complutense University of Madrid (UCM). She also studied sociology at The American University in Cairo and international law at the University of Vienna.

== Career ==
Having joined the diplomatic corps in 1994, Moreno was posted to Mexico, Sierra Leone, Cairo, Panama, and Moscow. She was appointed Under-Secretary of Foreign Affairs in July 2018.

Following the formation of a new government in January 2020 and the appointment of Arancha González Laya as new foreign minister, Moreno was entrusted a Secretariat of State solely responsible for international cooperation, removed from the General State Administration since 2011. She took office on 7 February 2020.

In July 2021, the new Foreign Minister, José Manuel Albares, appointed her as the 14th Secretary of State for Foreign Affairs.

In January 2024, she was appointed ambassador of Spain to the United States, being the first woman to hold the office. She assumed the office in February 2024. In September 2025, Moreno hosted Queen Sofía of Spain at the Embassy of Spain in Washington, D.C.

== Other activities ==
- Barcelona Institute for Global Health (ISGlobal), Member of the Board of Trustees
