= Secretary of State for Ibero-America =

Secretary of State for Ibero-America and the Caribbean and Spanish in the World
- Secretario de Estado para Iberoamérica y el Caribe y el Español en el Mundo
- Coat of arms of Spain

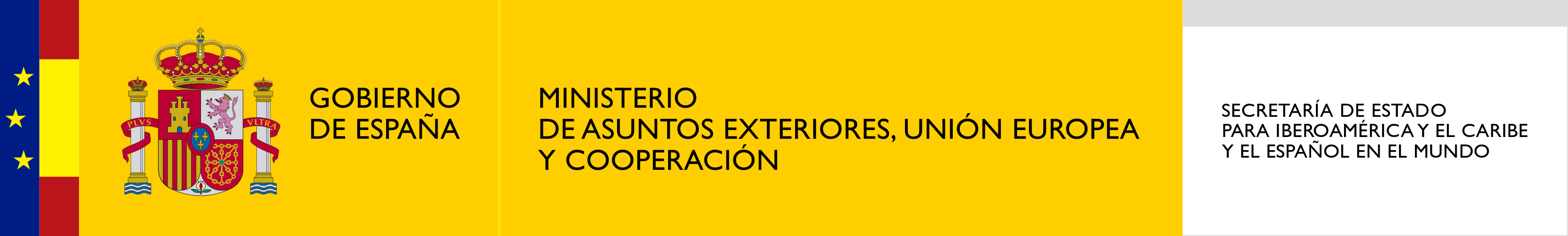

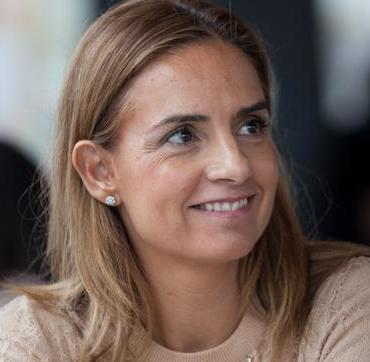
- Incumbent; Susana Sumelzo since December 20, 2023
- Ministry of Foreign Affairs; Secretariat of State for Ibero-America
- Style: The Most Excellent (formal); Mr. Secretary of State (informal)
- Nominator: The Foreign Minister
- Appointer: The Monarch
- Formation: September 8, 2006; 19 years ago
- First holder: Trinidad Jiménez
- Website: exteriores.gob.es

The secretary of state for Ibero-America and the Caribbean and Spanish in the World is a government official within the Spanish Ministry of Foreign Affairs, European Union and Cooperation responsible for executing the foreign policy over Ibero-America and the Caribbean, as well as promoting Spanish language around the world.

In these sense, the secretary of state prepares and coordinates Spain's participation in the Ibero-American Summits and the Ibero-American Community of Nations and gives support to the Madrid-based Ibero-American General Secretariat. Finally, the secretary of state also designs the policy towards the Organization of American States, giving the appropriate orders to the ambassador.

== Organization ==
The Secretariat of State is organized as follows:

- The Secretary of State.
  - The Cabinet, to provide political, technical, parliamentary, institutional and communication support.
- The Directorate-General for Ibero-America and the Caribbean, which executes the government policy related to these geographical areas.

It is supported by the following departments:

  - The Deputy Directorate-General for Mexico, Central America and the Caribbean.
  - The Deputy Directorate-General for Andean Countries.
  - The Deputy Directorate-General for Mercosur Countries and Ibero-American Multilateral Organizations.
- The Directorate-General for Spanish in the World, which establishes the general guidelines for the promotion Spanish language at all levels and promotes the collaboration with other countries and international organizations.

It is assisted by the following bodies:

  - The Deputy Directorate-General for Coherence in Action to Promote Spanish
  - The Deputy Directorate-General for the Promotion of Spanish in the World

To the Secretary of State for Ibero-America is attached the Instituto Cervantes.

== History ==
The Secretariat of State was created in 2006, by order of minister Miguel Ángel Moratinos. Moratinos separated the Ibero-American responsibilities from the Secretariat of State for Foreign Affairs and it assumed the Directorate-General of Policy for Ibero-America, a body created in 1966. It also established a new body, the Directorate-General for Ibero-American Multilateral Organizations. In the word of the government, it was created to "emphasize the importance [the government] attributes to Ibero-America in the development of our foreign policy, it also shows the will to promote the development of the Ibero-American Community of Nations and to encourage the presence and participation of Spain in the various multilateral international organizations in this geographical area". Trinidad Jiménez was appointed as the first secretary of state. It didn't last long, as in July 2010 the Secretariat was abolished to reduce government spending in the context of the 2008–2014 Spanish financial crisis.

After the change of government in late 2011, foreign minister José Manuel García-Margallo planned to restore this department, however, in January 2012 the decision was reverted and he merged it with the Secretariat of State for International Cooperation.

Finally, in July 2021 minister José Manuel Albares announced that the body would be recovered. Juan Fernández Trigo, charge d'affaires in Venezuela, was appointed for the post.

== List of secretaries of state ==
Officeholder		Term			Prime Minister	Monarch
Officeholder		Start	End	Duration	Prime Minister	Monarch
1	Trinidad Jimenez	9 September 2006	9 April 2009	2 years, 212 days	José Luis Rodríguez Zapatero	Juan Carlos I
2	Juan Pablo de Laiglesia	18 April 2009	27 July 2010	1 year, 100 days	José Luis Rodríguez Zapatero	Juan Carlos I
Responsibilities merged into the Secretariat of State for International Cooperation
3	Juan Fernández Trigo	20 July 2021	20 December 2023	2 years, 153 days	Pedro Sánchez	Felipe VI
4	Susana Sumelzo	20 December 2023	Incumbent	2 years, 261 days	Pedro Sánchez	Felipe VI
