= Que reste-t-il de l'occident? =

2014 book by Régis Debray and Renaud Girard

- Author: Régis Debray and Renaud Girard
- Language: French
- Subject: Western world
- Publisher: Éditions Grasset
- Publication date: 1 October 2014
- Publication place: France
- Pages: 144

Que reste-t-il de l'occident? (lit. 'What remains of the West?') is a 2014 book by the French writers Régis Debray and Renaud Girard. It consists of a discussion about the current state of the Western world and Western identity.

== Synopsis ==
Régis Debray, a left-wing philosopher, and Renaud Girard, a journalist for Le Figaro, discuss the state of the Western world in separate texts. They address whether it is undergoing a decline, discuss its identity crisis and its position in a rapidly changing world after the Cold War.

== Publication ==
Que reste-t-il de l'occident ? was published by Grasset on 1 October 2014. On the occasion of the publication, Le Figaro organised a debate between Debray and Giraud about the Iraq War, Ukraine and Africa.

== Reception ==
Jérôme Pellistrandi wrote in the Revue Défense nationale that he read the book in one sitting, that it alternates between optimism and pessimism, and complimented the authors for having the courage to address issues in ways that politicians cannot. He said the differing perspectives of the authors complement each other, such as when Girard laments how people increasingly ignore the Christian component of Western identity, while Debray laments how it has become associated with the English-speaking world and the laws of the market. Pellistrandi said the book "is not only welcome, but it is essential, if only to counterbalance professional decliners or media polemicists". Frédéric Pons of Conflits highlighted how Debray attacks the West with anti-imperialist arguments, targeted against the United States with the European Union as its "cuckold", and how Girard defends the West without resorting to moralism, but by confirming many of Debray's points while predicting a return of European Realpolitik. Pons called the book "invigorating" and a "rich, high-flying dialogue, sometimes annoying but always stimulating".
