= Jonathan Beller =

American film theorist

Academic background
- Education: Columbia University (BA); Duke University (PhD)

Academic work
- Discipline: Media studies
- Institutions: Pratt Institute

Jonathan Beller is a film theorist, culture critic and mediologist. He currently holds the position of Professor of Humanities and Media Studies and Critical and Visual Studies, Pratt Institute, Brooklyn, NY. He is the recipient of numerous awards and fellowships including Mellon, J.P. Getty and Fulbright Foundation grants and honors.

== Education ==
Beller received his B.A. and M.A. from Columbia University and Ph.D. from Duke University. He is also an adjunct professor at Barnard College.

== The Cinematic Mode of Production ==
Beller's major work, The Cinematic Mode of Production, proposes that cinema and its successor media (television, new digital audiovisual media) "brought the industrial revolution to the eye" and located the production of capital in the cerebral cortex. He has developed an analysis of what new media futurists call the "attention economy" within a Marxist approach to production that forefronts looking as labor. "To look is to labor": not only does the television (or radio) audience produce itself as a commodity to be vended by broadcasters to advertisers, but watching image-commodities is value-creating labour on those commodities, the looked-at commodity being the mechanism by which surplus value (the value created by the spectators above that which is returned to them - as services, pleasures - in a kind of barter) is extracted by the capitalist. Thus Beller proposes an understanding of exploitation and value creation today, with the important innovation of digital visual entertainment commodities of all sorts - furthering the proliferation of what Debord called "The Spectacle" ("capital at a degree of abstraction it has become image") - that completes Marx's analysis rather than refutes or "rethinks" it:

I am interested in the structural, psychological, libidinal, and corporeal adaptation of spectators to the protocols of global production. This conversion of spectating, generally conceived as a consumer activity, into a socially productive activity depends on the establishing of media as a worksite of global production. Today, mass media functions as a deterritorialized factory, where the maintenance and retooling of a transnational, transsubjective infrastructure composed of human beings, factories, cottage industries, service sectors, as well as programmed software and electronic hardware is essential to the valorization of capital. The cinematicity of objects is harnassed as an alternative force and used to intensify production. The cinema and its technological descendants extract the labor for the maintenance and calibration of the social totality. Without television, as well as fax-modems, telephones, computers and digitized, computerized money, production would grind to a halt. Each of these media burrows its way into the flesh of the globe. - Jonathan Beller, The Cinematic Mode of Production p. 112

While drawing on Italian post-workerist theorists associated with speculations about so-called "immaterial labour" Antonio Negri and Paolo Virno and their American associate Michael Hardt, Beller disagrees with their conclusion that developments such as "the social factory", "Post-Fordism" and the increasing capture and commodification of human social interaction itself means that the labour content of value is no longer measureable and thus Marx' theory of value obsolete. Beller lays out the case that it is not obsolete but that both it and our historical moment have been misunderstood. For Beller, Marx' observation that value is dead labour - alienated life - more comprehensively grasps the nature of value globally now than ever before, although value-creating labour today, which includes, for the most privileged strata of workers, so much leisure activity, entertainment consumption and unremunerated (unwaged, unsalaried) attention labour (what is often called "playbor") - labour conditions very different from those the international division of labour and polarizing class divisions assign to the poorest strata of the global working class - has to be understood as taking quite diverse concrete forms. This is in keeping, Beller argues, with Marx' conception of abstract labour, not a phenomenon requiring the transcendence of that analysis.

In addition to Guy Debord and the situationists, Beller's analysis absorbs the work of diverse mediologists and sociologists, principally Hans Magnus Enzensberger, the early Jean Baudrillard of The Political Economy of the Sign, Marshall McLuhan, Friedrich Kittler, Niklas Luhmann, and Régis Debray, and cultural critics like Walter Benjamin, Max Horkheimer and Theodor Adorno, to develop his case, in an original and yet fairly orthodox Marxist fashion, that capital has always been image and medium, the products of labour have always been abstract, and that the history of capital's development is one of the ongoing "recession of the real" from the language and sensual access of human subjects:

[T]he apolcalyptic themes of mid-century, themes that include the fundamental irrationality of the rational (Horkheimer’s Eclipse of Reason and Adorno and Horkheimer’s "Enlightenment as Mass Deception"), the evacuation of being not only from the sign, but from writing understood as the situation of all representation (Derrida), and the foreclosure of representation itself (Debord) function as a kind of barometer, charting the tidal rise of an unconscious that swallows up what may now be glimpsed as the relatively small islands of intelligibility that formerly seemed to contain All. The irrationality of capital’s rational accumultation, its constant humanization of an anti-human agenda was, in the onslaught of its expansion, understood to require profound structural shifts in the operation of mediation in order to adequately distort the field of intelligibility and oeprationalize it in accord with its deeper though unrepresentable logic. - Jonathan Beller, The Cinematic Mode of Production p. 298

Without seeking to minimize the dramatic historical transformations of modernity, Beller contends that the post-modern, post-Fordist, post-human, "digital" society that may seem so disconcertingly new and rapidly changing is a culmination of the progressive intensification and entrenchment of exploitative social relations with continuity going back at least to early modernity. "Digitalisation, and the ideology of the digital, is one of the great reifications of our time. It seems as if the word digital would sum up our entire life situation now because everything is digitized. Everything passes through the computer and the computer mediation, and we all know that. However, it is important to understand that the digital is in fact an abbreviation for a very complex set of social processes which means nothing less than a world system. It takes the entire organization of the world to produce the digital and the digital is now dialectically implicated in whatever else that world is. In fact if one thinks seriously about digitality, one can recognize that the contemporary sense of digital culture is really only the second version, the first being capital itself."

Beller's interest in new technologies and new media is avowedly political. He argues that the fascination with technology can disguise continuity and that "one has to see the technology itself as coming out of the prior sedimentation of dead labour....The earlier forms of exploitation are intensified and continued by the current forms of the removal of value. Furthermore, we don't know how to think about this, in part by design and in part by our own exploitation or the fact that our current situation depends on the exploitation of others. Two billion people live on two dollars a day. That's well known. It's also well known that that's the population of Earth in 1929. The current levels of poverty are higher than ever before, and therefore we are dealing with a kind of immiseration which is distinctly modern, or post-modern. What is the role of digitality in that?"

== Cinema of the Philippines ==
Beller has also written extensively about the cinema of the Philippines where he formerly taught film studies. Acquiring Eyes, his second published book, is on this topic.
