= Ciro Bustos =

Argentine revolutionary

- Born: Ciro Roberto Bustos Marcos; 29 March 1932; Mendoza, Argentina
- Died: 1 January 2017 (aged 84); Malmö, Sweden
- Other names: Mauricio, Pelao, and Pelado
- Education: National University of Cuyo
- Occupations: Painter, guerrilla fighter
- Known for: Guerilla activity in the 1960s

Ciro Roberto Bustos Marcos (29 March 1932 – 1 January 2017), better known as Ciro Bustos, was an Argentine painter who participated in various guerilla movements in Argentina and Bolivia during the 1960s. He was accused of providing information to the Bolivian army and the CIA that allowed them to locate and fight forces under the command of Che Guevara, although he always denied the accusation.

== People's Guerilla Army ==
Bustos studied in the Escuela de Bellas Artes at the National University of Cuyo and in 1961 he traveled to Cuba, attracted by the revolution which was just taking power. He began a close friendship with Alberto Granado which allowed him to come into contact for the first time with Ernesto "Che" Guevara, who in 1962 was planning to start a guerrilla war in Argentina in order to internationalize the Cuban revolution and see it succeed in his own country of origin.

Bustos joined the guerrilla organization the People's Guerrilla Army (EGP), which under the orders of Jorge Masetti in 1963 settled in a jungle region of the province of Salta, Argentina, near the Bolivian border and received the order to establish a support network for the organization in different provinces of that country. Desertions, internal struggles, the difficult geographic conditions of such a remote and rural area, and the operations of the Argentine National Gendarmerie brought about the failure of the project in 1964. Bustos managed to evade the security forces and fled to Uruguay, where he lived in secrecy, although without losing contact with Guevara nor with the prisoners of the EGP, to whom he was providing aid.

== Bolivian Campaign ==
After this first failure, Guevara formed a new guerrilla movement which was established in Ñancahuazú, Bolivia, and which was known as the Ejército de Liberación Nacional de Bolivia (ELN) or the Guerrilla de Ñancahuazú. This group began to operate in mid-1966 in an area in the south of the Santa Cruz Department, by orders of Guevara and under his direct command beginning in November of that year, with the objective of taking power. Bolivia was governed by the dictatorship imposed by general of the Bolivian Air Force René Barrientos after having ousted president-elect Víctor Paz Estenssoro, by means of the coup d'état of 4 November 1964.

At the end of 1966 Guevara requested the collaboration of Bustos again, who met up in La Paz with Régis Debray, French Marxist journalist and author, and together they traveled to Ñancahuazú, where Guevara ordered Bustos to establish a support network in Argentina and to recruit people aligned with Marxist ideology.

On 20 April 1967, Bustos, Régis Debray and English journalist George Andrew Roth, were detained by a patrol of the Bolivian Army in the city of Muyupampa, subjected to interrogation and torture with assistance of members of the CIA, judged and condemned to thirty years in prison, of which they only served four before being granted amnesty in 1970 by president Juan José Torres.

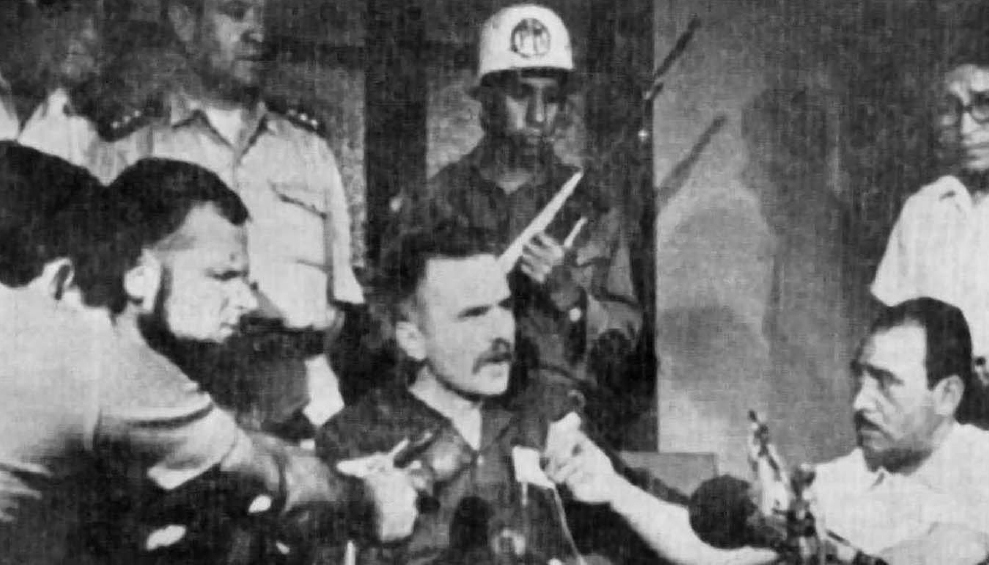
Régis Debray denouncing his sentence of thirty years in prison

Bustos continued living in a clandestine fashion in Mendoza province, under continuous threats of death on the part of the far-right organization Triple A. In 1976 he requested and was granted political asylum in Sweden, the country in which lived from then on, dedicating himself to painting. He died at 84 as the result of a cardiac arrest.

== Involvement in the capture of Che Guevara ==
Some versions, among them that of Jorge Castañeda Gutman and that of Frenchman Pierre Kalfon, accused Bustos of having spoken too much, resulting in Guevara's downfall.

Bustos always maintained that neither he nor Debray were subjected to torture because it wasn't necessary as when they were captured the Bolivian army was perfectly aware of the existence of the guerrilla group ELN, the location of its encampments, and that Guevara was at the head of it:

"It didn't have any importance what Debray and I said nor at what moment we said it; they already knew it."

In Bolivia, officers that took part in the actions confirmed that it was not necessary that the detainees confirm that comandante Ramón was Che because they already knew.

The documentary Sacrificio - ¿Quién traicionó al Che Guevara?, produced in Sweden in 2001 and directed by Erik Gandini, points in the same direction with interviews with retired Bolivian general Gary Prado (the main perpetrator of the capture of Che) and ex-CIA agent Félix Rodríguez, who confirmed that they didn't require the information Bustos and Debray could have provided during their captivity and they also didn't need the famous drawings of Guevara, created by Bustos during his interrogation, to confirm that it was Guevara himself who was at the head of the guerrilla movement of Santa Cruz.

In an interview with CNN in October 2013, Félix Rodríguez confirmed that the ideological positions of Guevara and Fidel Castro had been radicalized to the point of making them incompatible. While Castro and his regime were clearly pro-Soviet, Guevara was a supporter of the Chinese Marxist model, something that the Cuban regime could not tolerate given its great dependency on the Soviet Union. Rodríguez insinuated throughout the interview that Castro or his regime had prominent and crucial participation in the tragic end of Guevara's Bolivian adventure.

Other opinions, on the contrary, direct their accusation against the frenchman Régis Debray, of whom the assert that he was so terrified during the interrogations that it wasn't necessary to torture him for him to tell all that he knew. Aleida Guevara, the daughter of Che Guevara, places all the blame for the capture of the guerrilla leader on the French journalist, coming to assert in 1996 thatː

"Everything indicates that upon being taken prisoner, Debray talked too much."
