= The Joe Rogan Experience =

American podcast

- Genre: Talk
- Format: Audio; video
- Language: English

Cast and voices
- Hosted by: Joe Rogan

Production
- Production: Joe Rogan (occasional); Brian Redban (2009–2012); Jamie Vernon (2012–present)
- Length: 1–5+ hours

Technical specifications
- Video format: YouTube
- Audio format: Spotify

Publication
- No. of episodes: 2,576 (as of November 4, 2026)
- Original release: December 24, 2009
- Provider: YouTube (2013–present); Spotify (2020–present)

Related
- Website: joerogan.com

YouTube information
- Channel: PowerfulJRE
- Years active: 2013–present
- Subscribers: 21 million
- Views: 6.6 billion
- Last updated: Jun 25, 2026

The Joe Rogan Experience is a podcast hosted by American comedian, presenter, and UFC color commentator Joe Rogan. It was initiated on December 24, 2009, on YouTube by Rogan and comedian Brian Redban, who was its sole co-host and producer until 2012 when Jamie Vernon, who would eventually take over production, was hired to co-produce. By 2015, it was one of the world's most popular podcasts, regularly receiving millions of views per episode, and including a wide array of guests, including business magnate Elon Musk, rapper Kanye West, conspiracy theorist Alex Jones, whistleblower Edward Snowden, Senator Bernie Sanders, astrophysicist Neil deGrasse Tyson and President Donald Trump. From December 2020 to February 2024, the podcast was exclusively available on Spotify, with highlights uploaded onto the main Joe Rogan Experience YouTube channel. The podcast was originally recorded at Rogan's home in California, before moving to a private studio in Woodland Hills, Los Angeles. Production was relocated to Austin, Texas, after the podcast was licensed exclusively on Spotify in 2020.

Although most episodes feature entertainers, academics, comics, UFC fighters, and other non-political figures, The New York Times described the podcast as an "unlikely political influencer" in the 2020 U.S. presidential election after presidential candidates Andrew Yang and Tulsi Gabbard both had measurable surges in popularity and fundraising after making guest appearances on the program. Bernie Sanders received Rogan's endorsement after appearing on his show, and the Sanders campaign promoted it through its online channels. Four years later, Rogan endorsed then–former president Donald Trump.

The podcast has been described as a "boundary-free arena" and a platform for the intellectual dark web. It features an ideologically diverse mix of political guests. Rogan has been criticized for hosting far-right guests and has been accused of using racially insensitive language. He has also been criticized for his opinions concerning the COVID-19 pandemic and vaccines, and for hosting a number of guests who expressed opinions that contradicted the present medical orthodoxy. Supporters of the podcast have praised Rogan for his advocacy of free speech.

== History ==
=== 2009–2012 ===
During the early 2000s, Rogan hired Brian Redban, a self-taught video editor and an employee at a Gateway 2000 computer store in Ohio, to work for him full-time to film, produce, and edit videos for his website. Rogan had noticed video work that Redban did for comedian Doug Stanhope and invited him to film him and his group on stand-up comedy tours. Redban accepted and relocated to California in the process, following Rogan with a camera and "recording everything". After several years, Redban noticed that fans were demanding an increasing amount of content from Rogan and for it to be delivered faster. This prompted the two to seek new ways of quickening what was a lengthy editing process to make their website and content more interactive. Coupled with his interest in popular live video streaming services of the time, Redban wanted "to do the same thing I was filming, but live," and set up live streams on Justin.tv from the green room at Rogan's various comedy gigs. Redban had no prior experience with audio engineering, so he taught himself how to operate the mixing board and microphone setups through his subsequent podcasts. After some time on Justin.tv, Rogan suggested the idea of hosting a live video stream with Redban from his home and interacting with fans in a chatroom and on Twitter, with the audio portion released as a downloadable podcast. Rogan was influenced by the open discussion format appearing on Opie and Anthony and the live Ustream show that co-host Anthony Cumia did from his basement studio, Live from the Compound.

The first episode aired live on December 24, 2009, which initially took the form of a weekly broadcast on Ustream, with the pair "sitting in front of laptops bullshitting". Much of the first episode was dead air with the hosts figuring out the equipment, and the early episodes featured an animated snowflake effect that was reintroduced on episode Nos. 674 in 2015 and No. 1,000 in 2017. The show developed with Rogan inviting friends as guests and having lengthy conversations on various subjects; comedian Ari Shaffir was the first, who appeared on episode No. 3 on January 6, 2010.

Rogan said that maintaining a consistent schedule was important in jumpstarting the podcast's growth, and it soon grew to two episodes a week. In May 2010, the podcast acquired its first sponsor in a partnership with the sex-toy production company Fleshlight. The company withdrew in mid-2012 when it claimed it had saturated its market. By August 2010, the podcast was formally named The Joe Rogan Experience as an homage to The Jimi Hendrix Experience, and aired live several times a week. In May 2011, Rogan secured a deal with the satellite radio service SiriusXM to have the podcast air on its uncensored talk channel The Virus. That year, Rogan said that the podcast was helping his stand-up comedy as he would take ideas that arose during conversations and develop them into routines.

=== 2013–2020: First YouTube era ===
In January 2013, video episodes of the podcast started to be uploaded onto YouTube under the account PowerfulJRE; its episodes regularly achieved viewership in the hundred thousands to millions. Later in 2013, Redban started to reduce his time as the podcast's sole producer as Rogan had increased the number of podcasts each week, "and it got to the point where [Rogan] wanted to keep on going, six, seven hours" which became too much for him to handle alone. As a result, Jamie Vernon was hired as a second producer, initially to fill in as Redban's assistant, leaving Redban to produce roughly half of subsequent episodes. Vernon soon took over full time and Redban subsequently appeared on the podcast as a guest.

Originally, the podcast was recorded at Rogan's home in California. From November 24, 2011, some episodes were recorded at the Ice House Comedy Club in Pasadena, California, also known as the Deathsquad Studios. Beginning on November 27, 2012, the majority of episodes were recorded in a private studio that Rogan acquired in Woodland Hills, Los Angeles. The 1,000th episode aired on August 18, 2017, and featured comedians Joey Diaz and Tom Segura as guests.

In April 2020, Rogan began having guests take an antibody test for COVID-19 before recording the podcast during the COVID-19 pandemic. Rogan used a personalized, on-demand service that offers each test for $299.

=== 2020–2024: Spotify-exclusive era ===
In May 2020, Rogan announced that starting September 2020, The Joe Rogan Experience would be available on Spotify in an exclusive licensing deal worth an estimated $200 million. Under the terms of the agreement, uploads of full episodes to YouTube continued until December 2020, after which the podcast became exclusive to Spotify. Highlight clips are still uploaded to YouTube. Rogan emphasized that the podcast would retain the same format, and that Spotify would not have any creative control. On the day following Rogan's announcement, Spotify's share price increased by seven percent. The move to Spotify coincided with Rogan's relocation from Los Angeles to Austin, Texas, and the debut of a new, temporary studio there. The first new episode released on Spotify was no. 1,530 with comedian Duncan Trussell, which lasted for over five hours. On September 8, 2020, Rogan debuted the studio on episode no. 1,533 with guest Adam Curry. (He has subsequently moved to another, more permanent studio in Austin.)

After the podcast became available on Spotify on September 1, 2020, people reported on social media that past episodes with more controversial or far-right guests, including Alex Jones, Milo Yiannopoulos, Gavin McInnes, and Chris D'Elia, among others, were missing from the platform. Episodes featuring comedian and activist Tommy Chong, comedian Joey Diaz, and Mikhaila Peterson, daughter of Jordan Peterson, were also unavailable. VICE later reported that Spotify CEO Daniel Ek defended having episode No. 1,509 on the platform, during which Rogan and author and journalist Abigail Shrier discussed topics that some deemed transphobic, causing some Spotify employees to voice their concerns to management. A Spotify spokesperson said the episode was within its content guidelines. Rogan later clarified that the company had said nothing to him about plans to censor or editorialize the podcast, as some employees had suggested. He also pointed to the abundance of song lyrics hosted on Spotify that some would consider offensive.

In October 2020, the production of new episodes was put on hold for a week after Vernon tested positive for COVID-19. Rogan and the rest of the staff tested negative and resumed once they got the all-clear from a doctor.

In episode No. 1,554, Kanye West clarified his reasons for running for president of the United States in 2020 and how it began in 2015. West was one of Rogan's most anticipated guests after the idea of Kanye coming on the podcast first surfaced in late 2018 and a premature confirmation by West in early 2019, ultimately taking close to a year before Kanye finally appeared on the show.

In January 2022, an open letter signed by 270 health care professionals called on Spotify to develop a counter-misinformation content policy. An epidemiologist who signed the letter stated that she viewed Rogan as "a menace to public health", and that his ideas are "fringe", and "not backed in science". The health care professionals especially took issue with an episode that featured Robert W. Malone which was criticized for a comment Rogan made where he stated that he believed that young, healthy people do not need a COVID-19 vaccine. It was later reported that the letter gained an additional thousand signatures.

On February 1, 2024, only a month before the murder of Collin Small, alleged perpetrator Sheldon Johnson was featured as a guest on The Joe Rogan Experience, wherein he talked about his criminal history and advocated for prison rehabilitation.

=== 2024–present: Return to YouTube and other platforms ===
In February 2024, Spotify signed Rogan to a new $250 million contract but announced his show would not be exclusive to its service and instead be available to other platforms. Shortly thereafter, the podcast returned to Apple Podcasts. On February 29, 2024, for the first time in more than three years, a full episode of the podcast, an interview with Katt Williams, was released on YouTube. Episode No. 2,219 featured former US President Donald Trump during his 2024 presidential campaign. The three-hour episode went viral and acquired over 26 million views in its first 24 hours on YouTube. YouTube noted in a statement that the full episode “didn't appear prominently” in searches on the site, which was later fixed. On October 29, Rogan had uploaded the episode on his personal X account after he claimed YouTube hid the video from search results on purpose. The video gained 18.4 million views on X in two days. On October 31, the YouTube video had amassed 41 million views, becoming the podcast's second-most-viewed episode on the platform.

== Format ==
There are at least four types of episodes, as labeled on YouTube and Spotify. These are the "main" general category (of which there are over 2000 episodes), "JRE MMA Show", "Protect our Parks", and the "Fight Companion" episodes, which are streamed live.

== Guests ==
=== Comedians ===
- Judd Apatow
- Owen Benjamin
- Doug Benson
- Bill Burr
- Louis C.K.
- Andrew Dice Clay
- Dane Cook
- Jeff Dye
- Andy Dick
- Nick DiPaolo
- Nikki Glaser
- Bobcat Goldthwait
- Tom Green
- Kevin Hart
- Kevin James
- Anthony Jeselnik
- Bobby Lee
- Artie Lange
- Howie Mandel
- Sebastian Maniscalco
- Marc Maron
- Ralphie May
- Randall Park
- Greg Proops
- Rafinha Bastos
- Matt Rife
- Jeff Ross
- Bob Saget
- Adam Sandler
- Amy Schumer
- Pauly Shore
- Dave Smith
- Doug Stanhope
- Theo Von
- Harland Williams
- Steven Wright
- Iliza Shlesinger

=== Filmmakers and writers ===
- Andrew Jarecki
- Mike Judge
- Guy Ritchie
- Jon Ronson
- Taylor Sheridan
- Kevin Smith
- Zack Snyder
- Oliver Stone
- Chad Stahelski
- Quentin Tarantino
- Louis Theroux
- Alex Winter
- Chuck Palahniuk

=== Actors ===
- Jon Bernthal
- Josh Brolin
- Priyanka Chopra
- Bradley Cooper
- Robert Downey Jr.
- Scott Eastwood
- Mel Gibson
- Luke Grimes
- Woody Harrelson
- Ethan Hawke
- Taylor Kitsch
- Matthew McConaughey
- Dennis Quaid
- Katee Sackhoff
- Rick Schroder
- Billy Bob Thornton

=== Musicians ===
- James Hetfield
- Oliver Anthony
- Travis Barker
- Gary Clark Jr.
- Billy Corgan
- Charley Crockett
- Miley Cyrus
- Kid Cudi
- Tom DeLonge
- Melissa Etheridge
- Everlast
- Shooter Jennings
- Liz Phair
- Jelly Roll
- Ice Cube
- Wiz Khalifa
- John Mellencamp
- Shirley Manson
- Post Malone
- Ted Nugent
- Kid Rock
- David Lee Roth
- Lionel Richie
- Paul Stanley
- Steven Tyler
- Immortal Technique
- Bono
- Jesse Welles
- Kanye West
- Demi Lovato
- Jewel
- Snoop Dogg
- The Black Keys

=== Political/religious commentators and activists ===
- Scott Adams
- Ben Burgis
- Steven Crowder
- Daryl Davis
- Jimmy Dore
- Riley Gaines
- Glenn Greenwald
- Alex Jones
- Charles C. Johnson
- Ana Kasparian
- TJ Kirk
- Graham Linehan
- Jordan Peterson
- Wes Huff
- Chris Rufo
- Dave Rubin
- Ben Shapiro
- Matt Taibbi
- Cornel West
- Milo Yiannopoulos
- Cenk Uygur

=== Politicians ===
- Rod Blagojevich
- Dan Crenshaw
- John Fetterman
- Tulsi Gabbard
- Wesley Hunt
- Robert F. Kennedy Jr.
- Rupert Lowe
- Anna Paulina Luna
- Kash Patel
- Rand Paul
- Rick Perry
- Pierre Poilievre
- Bernie Sanders
- James Talarico
- Donald Trump
- JD Vance
- Jesse Ventura
- Andrew Yang

=== Businesspeople ===
- Sam Altman
- Marc Andreessen
- Jimmy Donaldson
- Jensen Huang
- Palmer Luckey
- Elon Musk
- Dave Portnoy
- Peter Thiel
- Mark Zuckerberg

=== Athletes ===
- Lance Armstrong
- Antonio Brown
- Daniel Cormier
- Terence Crawford
- Tony Hawk
- Laird Hamilton
- Evander Holyfield
- Max Holloway
- Demetrious Johnson
- Jon Jones
- Aaron Rodgers
- Jake Shields
- Kelly Slater
- Ilia Topuria
- Mike Tyson
- BJ Penn
- Dustin Poirier
- Fedor Gorst

== Influence ==
In January 2015, the podcast was listened to by more than 11 million people. By October 2015, it had grown to 16 million downloads each month. In April 2019, Rogan said that the podcast had 190 million downloads each month.

Starting in 2017, Rogan and friends Bert Kreischer, Tom Segura, and Ari Shaffir participate in an annual "Sober October" tradition, which has influenced some listeners to curb their addictions by partaking in the challenge. In addition to sobriety from drugs and alcohol, the tradition has also encouraged skill learning and daily workout competitions.

Elon Musk's appearance on episode No. 1,169 on September 6, 2018, saw Musk smoke cannabis, which attracted worldwide press attention and was followed by a 9% fall in Tesla stock.

In 2023, Cornell University scholars Adam Szetela and Shiyu Ji published data in Newsweek showing how The Joe Rogan Experience has impacted the book sales of guests. For example, Graham Hancock's Visionary: The Mysterious Origins of Human Consciousness (The Definitive Edition of Supernatural) experienced a 519% sales increase within one week of his appearance on the podcast. Phil McGraw, Neil deGrasse Tyson, and other authors experienced even bigger sales increases.

The Norwegian podcaster Wolfgang Wee has been compared to The Joe Rogan Experience.

=== 2020 U.S. presidential election ===
According to The New York Times, Rogan and The Joe Rogan Experience became an "unlikely political influencer" in the 2020 U.S. presidential election after presidential candidates Andrew Yang and Tulsi Gabbard both saw measurable surges in popularity and fundraising after making guest appearances on the program in 2019, and in 2020, when presidential candidate Bernie Sanders saw a surge of press coverage in national news and global media outlets as a result of his campaign using a clip from The Joe Rogan Experience showing Rogan speaking favorably about the candidate and saying on air, "I think I'll probably vote for Bernie."

The podcast was integral to Yang's campaign. In the 30 days before the interview, Yang averaged 62 donations per day; in the 30 days after, he received about 2,150 daily. Research has credited Yang's appearance on the Joe Rogan Experience, in particular Yang's discussions with Rogan about the Universal Basic Income (UBI), as having had a considerable impact on the prominence of UBI in public debates, with a potential impact on the COVID-19 relief bills (which included one-time payments similar to UBI).

A study conducted by Coleman Insights in 2019 with 1,000 monthly podcast listeners aged 18 to 64 revealed that The Joe Rogan Experience ranked the highest in the "unaided awareness" category, double that of any other podcast.

On September 8, 2020, President Donald Trump tweeted a clip from Rogan's interview with Mike Tyson, in which the boxer says hurting people can be "orgasmic". Later in the day, Trump tweeted a clip in which Rogan jokes, "Biden, to me, is like having a flashlight with a dying battery and going for a long hike in the woods. It is not going to work out. It's not gonna make it." On September 13, UFC fighter Tim Kennedy tweeted that, in Rogan's podcast with him two days earlier, the host had "offered to moderate a debate between [Biden] and [Trump] ... It would be four hours with no live audience. Just the two candidates, cameras, and their vision of how to move this country forward. Who wants this?" The next day, President Trump tweeted in reply, "I do!" This prompted Sunny Hostin of The View to denounce Rogan as being unfit to hold a presidential debate because she claimed Rogan was "misogynistic, racist [and] homophobic" for having made insensitive comments at selected times during his long history as a podcast host. (Note: Also in the podcast with Tim Kennedy, Rogan discussed a premise from his Netflix comedy special Triggered in which he jokes that the women of Keeping Up with the Kardashians had influenced Caitlyn Jenner to become a woman, specifically saying, "Maybe if you live with crazy bitches long enough they fuckin' turn you into one.")

=== 2024 U.S. presidential election ===
Various sources wrote that Rogan's interviews with Trump and JD Vance helped the former president's candidacy for the 2024 general election, particularly due to the show's largely young male audience. According to CNN, Trump made 32 false claims, none of which Rogan fact-checked or attempted to rebuke, leading to media criticism that Rogan was taking an uncritical approach with Trump by not pushing back on his false claims.

Rogan and Democratic candidate Kamala Harris discussed having her appear on the show during the campaign, but could not make the scheduling work. Another potential factor, according to an adviser to Harris's husband Doug Emhoff, was that there was a "backlash with some of our progressive staff that didn't want her to be on it".

== Criticism and reactions ==
The show has engaged with a wide variety of controversial topics.

=== Extraterrestrials ===
On June 20, 2019, conspiracy theorist Bob Lazar, along with producer Jeremy Corbell, made an appearance on the show where Rogan frequently discusses the possibility of aliens and extraterrestrial life. This episode was cited as the inspiration for the planned Facebook event and Internet meme known as "Storm Area 51, They Can't Stop All of Us", created one week later.

The episode with Lazar and Corbell remains the most watched episode on YouTube, with over 66 million views.

=== Climate change ===
In February 2022, journalist Amy Westervelt criticized Rogan's appearances on his podcast for climate change denial, and alleged Rogan was involved in starting false rumors that environmentalists deliberately set wildfires in 2020 in the western United States.

=== COVID-19 ===
On April 27, 2021, Rogan made remarks about COVID-19 vaccines, in particular suggesting that young, healthy people have no need to be vaccinated against the virus. Rogan's view was criticized by Anthony Fauci and White House communication director Kate Bedingfield, as well as by several media outlets. Rogan acknowledged there was "some legitimate science" behind Fauci's view and emphasized that he is not a doctor or "a respected source of information".

On October 13, 2021, in conversation with CNN's Sanjay Gupta, Rogan defended taking the medication ivermectin his physician prescribed him off-label for treating COVID-19. CNN had previously said Rogan was "taking a livestock drug despite warnings" when Rogan contracted COVID19 in late August that year. Rogan accused the news network of lying because they claimed the drug was a "horse dewormer"; ivermectin, an antiparasitic medication, is widely used for both humans and animals. On that same episode, Gupta admitted that, as ivermectin was prescribed for Rogan by a physician, it should not have been referred to as a "horse dewormer". Rogan reiterated his view that people should have the autonomy to choose to get vaccinated, and repeated the false claim that ivermectin is a legitimate treatment option for COVID-19.

In a December 2021 episode, guest Robert W. Malone compared the U.S. reaction to the pandemic to the rise of Nazi Germany, claiming that a "mass formation psychosis" had developed among its residents. YouTube took down the episode as violations of its COVID-19 misinformation rules. An open letter by 270 U.S. healthcare professionals, scientists and professors called for Spotify to drop the podcast, citing the interview and Rogan's "concerning history of broadcasting misinformation, particularly regarding the COVID-19 pandemic". On January 3, 2022, Congressman Troy Nehls entered a full transcript of the interview with Malone into the Congressional Record in order to circumvent what he said was censorship by social media.

Later that month, musician Neil Young threatened to pull his music from Spotify if the company did not drop Rogan, saying Rogan was disseminating COVID-19 vaccine misinformation. After the company declined his request, Young's music was removed from Spotify on January 26. Joni Mitchell also removed her music from Spotify in solidarity with Young, as did Bruce Springsteen's guitarist Nils Lofgren and podcaster Brené Brown.

Singer David Draiman, on the other hand, "applauded" Spotify's decision, saying that "I may not agree with everything Joe Rogan or his guests say, but they're entitled to have the forum to say it".

On January 30, 2022. Spotify announced that it would add a content advisory to all episodes of all podcasts discussing COVID-19, pointing to its own information hub on the topic.

=== Insensitive language and removed episodes ===
In February 2022, singer India Arie shared a compilation of Rogan saying the racial slur nigger on The Joe Rogan Experience on Instagram. Rogan apologized, calling his past language "regretful and shameful" while also saying that the clips were taken out of context and he only quoted the slur to discuss its use by others. The footage in question was first published by the political action committee (PAC) PatriotTakes, an affiliate of the liberal PAC MeidasTouch. This resulted in allegations of a defamation attempt by MeidasTouch, which MeidasTouch representatives denied in an interview with Barstool Sports founder Dave Portnoy. Rogan described the video compilation as a "political hit job". A number of UFC fighters defended Rogan.

Spotify refused to carry 42 episodes of the podcast when it acquired the exclusive rights. Spotify said it spoke to Rogan about his "history of using some racially insensitive language", and was reported to have written (in an internal memo) that Rogan selected 70 episodes which were removed on February 4, 2022, all of which pre-date the COVID-19 pandemic.

India Arie complained about the "Fraction of a penny" royalties Spotify was paying to musicians in comparison to the $100 million Rogan had received for his exclusivity agreement with Spotify. Spotify later said in an internal memo it would be committing $100 million to create and promote audio from creators from historically marginalized groups.

== Reception ==
The podcast has been described by Slate magazine as "an important node of the intellectual dark web". In an article for National Review, Theodore Kupfer wrote that the podcast, hosted by "A weed-smoking DMT-obsessive whose most cherished political cause is the quest to end male circumcision", has become "one of the last bastions for civil discussion in contemporary America".

In August 2010, nine months after its launch, The Joe Rogan Experience entered the list of Top 100 podcasts on iTunes. In 2017 and 2018, the podcast was Apple's second-most-downloaded podcast.

== Awards ==
In February 2014, the podcast won a Stitcher Award for Best Overall Show of 2013.

In January 2019, the podcast won Best Comedy Podcast at the iHeartRadio Podcast Awards.
