= United States of the West =

Political satire published by Régis Debray in 2002

The United States of the West is a political union satirically advocated by French writer, philosopher, social commentator, and self-proclaimed mediologist, Régis Debray (born 1940), in his short essay entitled, Empire 2.0: A Modest Proposal for a United States of the West by Xavier de C***. (asterisks in the original)

== Synopsis ==
Empire 2.0 is presented as a fictitious letter sent to Debray from an old acquaintance, a French expatriate named Xavier de C***, who is writing to him from America in October 2001, in the immediate aftermath of the 9/11 attacks.

The essay was first published in France in 2002, as L'édit de Caracalla ou plaidoyer pour des Etats-Unis d'occident.

In Empire 2.0, Debray's fictitious acquaintance, Xavier de C***, argues that the political enfranchisement of Europe by the United States of America and the official consolidation of the West into an enlarged United States of the West, is the best solution to confronting the current ideological threats and political challenges the West faces from radical Islam, international terrorism, competition for finite resources and responsible resource management, as well as population decline, and would be the only effective safeguard against any future claims to a "Confucian" or Asian empire, asserted by an ascendant, militarized, and aggressive China.

== Outline ==
=== Epilogue ===
Debray begins the epilogue with the lines: "A man of quality went off to war, and never came home. From the other shore of America, he wrote to an old friend from university days, a mellowed Parisian with the perspective of distance."

=== The Letter ===
The letter to Debray from Xavier, begins: "The past is over. You can guess which past I mean, since I'm no longer writing you in our common lingo."

Debray's Xavier de C***, formerly a French citizen, government official, political consultant, and international military advisor, then recounts to Debray how he swore his oath of allegiance in New York City and gained American citizenship in September 2001, immediately after the 9/11 attacks.

=== Xavier's Argument for A United States of the West ===
Xavier discusses the current state of the world, world history, American and European styles of government, western culture, the intellectual traditions of France, the failures of the European Union, NATO and the United Nations to effectively address serious crises, and his own conception of the Western cultural tradition and Western philosophy, as well as what the events of 9/11 and the inevitable American response which will shortly follow, portend for both men.

In his letter, de C*** states that currently, only the United States is in a position to take physical and moral responsibility for the stability of the political and economic order, as well as the preservation of the shared values and culture of Western nations, because the United States is the only Western political entity capable of effectively and decisively using force against the ideological enemies of the distinctly "Western" values and traditions which Europeans and Americans share, thus the United States is the only truly politically empowered nation in the Western world.

Xavier argues that there is essentially already an informal arrangement between many nations and the United States, and that if Europe, namely France, wants to play any serious role in her own domestic affairs, as well as a leading role in guiding or shaping international relations, then European citizens must gain many of the rights currently afforded solely to U.S. citizens in regards to the administration of the U.S. government.

Xavier believes that France and other nations could preserve their local and regional governments and cultural identities, and could refine the more base aspects and tendencies of inferior American culture, much as Greece contributed to Rome in the classical era.

While France and Europe would contribute to a larger whole by electing presidents and assuming roles in the U.S. government, instead of wasting time trying to counter U.S. hegemony economically but not militarily, through the European Union and other economic entities, which all ultimately fail to govern because they lack the "force" of law, they would sacrifice little in Xavier's eyes, and gain individual political rights, in tune with the Western democratic tradition.

Xavier argues that because Europeans and other "Occidental" or Westernized societies continue to deny the reality of their near complete military and economic dependency on the United States, as well as their commonality with American culture out of pretension, and fail to admit the gravity of the situation that the entire West at-large faces from distinctly intolerant, illiberal, and un-Western ideologies and cultures quickly spreading throughout the world, Europeans will face cultural extinction, a further disintegration of economic security, free trade, and free conscience, as well as political oppression within a few hundred years.

In de C***'s eyes, as American power wanes from lack of coherence, guidance, and grand strategy, which only European knowledge and insight can provide, Europeans will find themselves in a much more degraded state, and at the mercy of social and political ideologies and forces which are incompatible with Western virtues and conceptions of individuality; a decline that must be avoided and reversed by either a large influx of new citizens into the American structure or expanded national, civic and cultural awareness, among a broadened, cohesive citizenry.

Xavier advises Debray, and the French to lead the effort for this "official merger" between Europe and the United States, instead of persisting along the current path, because the current tendencies of European governments have led to a precarious situation and continuing along this trajectory only serves to preserve a kind of servile, political half-life among European nations and citizens, either as "junior partners" in U.S. led ventures, or conversely, as merely resentful, reluctant critics in ineffective organizations such as the United Nations and NATO or other naive, self-deluding social organizations.

Xavier states that France is in danger of losing individual rights, political freedoms, and even the ability to co-exist with other nations, because Totalitarian Islam continues to acquire influence as a legitimate reaction to Western economic and military practices, and Islamic culture in general, will soon have over 2 billion adherents. As Europe faces a serious depopulation crisis, and "the West" only constitutes about 1/4 of the world's current population, there is no reason to believe that any Western values will be transmitted down through any of the generations beyond the next 200 years.

Xavier asks rhetorically, if individual liberties, namely women's rights, religious freedom and tolerance, political stability and domestic order, would be better preserved if Europe were to accommodate totalitarian Islamists as France and England did with Hitler at Munich, or alternately whether Europe and the West would survive the ideological and political machinations of China, if China were allowed to become the world's only economic and military hyperpower, following U.S. military overstretch or economic depression resulting from this lack of Western cohesion, and the blowback effects of U.S. unilateralism operating without a moderating European influence.

He firmly believes that the United States should extend United States citizenship (through a modernized Edict of Caracalla to all Canadians, Latinos, Europeans, Japanese, Koreans, New Zealanders and Australians, in order to formalize the political center of Western civilization, which in fact, already exists and is tacitly understood, thus formally extending democracy to people who are already governed by U.S. economic and security policies, as well as dominated by American cultural forms, yet have no vote or official representation in the U.S. government, and thus no real say in strategic or economic affairs.

=== Who is Xavier de C*** ? ===
In his "Epitaph", following the end of the letter, Debray describes Xavier as a "man of letters against his will", a "man of action, always preferring to be 'on the ground'", who specialized in classical studies, specifically the Roman Empire. He goes on to state that he was a "strategist, resolute and without illusions... (who) had intelligence, without the morose of self-indulgence that so often accompanies it".

== Related writings ==
Cullen Murphy in his book, Are We Rome? The Fall of an Empire and the Fate of America, writes about American expansionists and their desire to bring America, and especially American culture, to the rest of the world, starting with Europe.

== See also ==
- Atlantic Union
- Of Paradise and Power
