= Prix du livre politique =

Annual French literary award

The Prix du livre politique (the political book prize) is an annual French literary prize awarded to the best political book published. The €5,000 award was established by Lire la Société, a French group whose goal is to revive interest in public affairs. The prize announcement is one of the events of the Journée du Livre Politique (Political Book Day), organized by the group since 1991. The prize is to promote reflection, discourse and political thought.

== Winners ==
- 1995 - Le passé d’une illusion, François Furet, Éditions Robert Laffont
- 1996 - Les blessures de la vérité, Laurent Fabius, Editions Flammarion
- 1997 - Le voleur dans la maison, Jean-François Revel, Editions Plon
- 1998 - Par l’amour de l’art, Régis Debray, Editions Gallimard
- 1999 - Une ambition française, Alain Duhamel, Editions Plon
- 2000 - Libération, la biographie, Jean Guisnel, Editions La Découverte (Jean Guisnel a été rédacteur en chef du journal de 1991 à 1996)
- 2001 - L’abolition, Robert Badinter, Editions Fayard
- 2002 - Le gouvernement invisible, Laurent Joffrin, Editions Arléa (among the members of the jury was Michèle Cotta
- 2003 - J’ai vu finir le monde ancien, Alexandre Adler, Editions Grasset
- 2004 - Ni putes ni soumises, Fadela Amara, Editions La Découverte
- 2005 - Le venin de la mélancolie, Denis Tillinac, Editions la Table ronde
- 2006 - La tentation obscurantiste, Caroline Fourest, Editions Grasset
- 2007 - Qu’est-ce que l’intégration ?, Dominique Schnapper, Editions Gallimard
- 2008 - La Reine du monde : essai sur la démocratie d’opinion, Jacques Julliard, Editions Flammarion
- 2009 - Cahiers secrets de la Ve République : Tome 2, 1977-1986, Michèle Cotta, Fayard (parmi les membres du jury il y a Laurent Joffrin)
- 2010 - Le sorcier de l'Elysée, l'histoire secrète de Jacques Pilhan, François Bazin, Plon
- 2011 - La France est-elle finie ?, Jean-Pierre Chevènement, Fayard
- 2012 - Populisme : la pente fatale, Dominique Reynié, Plon, 2011
- 2013 - Jours de pouvoir, Bruno Le Maire, Gallimard, 2012
- 2014 - La récréation, Frédéric Mitterrand, Robert Laffont, 2013
- 2015 - Les Chirac - Les secrets du clan, Béatrice Gurrey, Robert Laffont, 2015
- 2016 - Un Français de tant de souches, Alain Minc, Editions Grasset, 2015
- 2017 - Plus rien à faire, Plus rien à foutre, Brice Teinturier, Robert Laffont, 2016
- 2018 - Printemps de force : Une histoire engagée du mouvement étudiant au Québec (1958-2013), Arnaud Theurillat-Cloutier, Lux Éditeur, 2017
- 2019 - L’économie sociale au Québec : Une perspective politique, Gabriel Arsenault, Presses de l'Université du Québec, 2018
- 2020 - TBA
