= Laurence Debray =

French writer (born 1976)

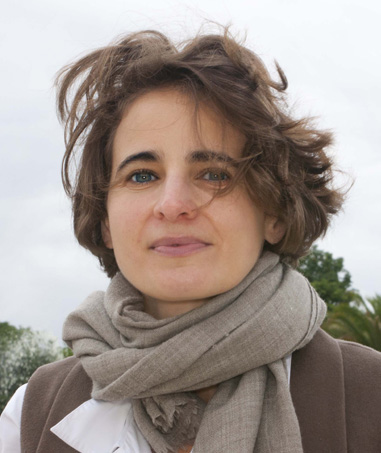
- Debray in 2013
- Born: 1976 (age 49–50); Paris, France
- Citizenship: French
- Education: Sorbonne; London School of Economics; HEC Paris
- Occupations: Writer, screenwriter and biographer
- Children: 2

Laurence Debray (French: [lɔʁɑ̃s dəbʁɛ]; born 1976) is a French writer, daughter of Régis Debray and Elizabeth Burgos.

In 2018 she wrote a biography of her parents.

In her childhood, she lived in a camp in Cuba. She studied History and Literature at the Sorbonne and Economics at the London School of Economics and HEC Paris. She dedicated herself to working in finance.

She is an admirer of King Juan Carlos I of Spain and of the Spanish transition, of which she has made books and a documentary.

She lived in France and Spain, with long stays in Venezuela, London and New York City. She is married to Émile Servan-Schreiber (son of Jean-Jacques Servan-Schreiber) and has two children.

== Bibliography ==
- La forja de un rey: Juan Carlos I, de sucesor de Franco a Rey de España: política exterior y democratización interior (2000)
- Juan Carlos d'Espagne (2013)
- Juan Carlos de España (2016)
- Hija de revolucionarios (2017)
- Mon roi déchu: Juan Carlos d'Espagne (2021)
