= Louise Merzeau =

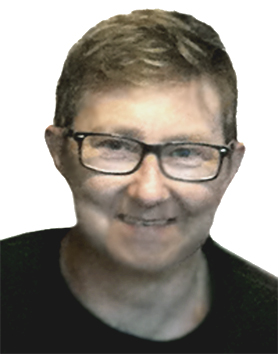
- Louise Merzeau en 2013.
- Born: Sylvie Louise Lucienne Merzeau; 8 November 1963; 15th arrondissement of Paris
- Died: 15 July 2017 (aged 53); 20th arrondissement of Paris
- Employer: Paris Nanterre University (1993–)
- Website: merzeau.net

Sylvie Merzeau (commonly called Louise Merzeau, 8 November 1963 – 15 July 2017) was a French academic, university professor at the Paris Nanterre University (specializing in communication studies) and a photographer.

Merzeau was a trustee of Wikimedia France between 2015 and 2017.

== Biography ==
Louise Merzeau was a former student of the École normale supérieure de Saint-Cloud (L1982 promotion) and a qualified teacher of contemporary literature (1985). Her doctoral thesis "From scriptural to index: text, photography, document" in 1993 was written under supervision of Nicole Boulestreau. She passed her habilitation to conduct research in 2011 on the subject of the concept of memory in the age of internet. In 2016, she became a university professor at Paris-Nanterre. She was a co-director of the Nanterre research laboratory Dicen-IDF and member of the e.laboratory on Human Trace Complex System Digital Campus UNESCO founded by Béatrice Galinon-Mélénec.

Merzeau's research was inspired by the concept of mediology designed by Régis Debray and was primarily about the relations between culture and technology, in particular, on the technological, institutional, and sociological aspects of memory. She has designed the concept of hypersphere to extend the list of mediaspheres initially proposed by Debray, to characterize sociological and technical ecosystems associated with the development of the internet. She was the chief co-editor of the journal Les cahiers de médiologie during several years.

Merzeau also focused on the question of traces – that she developed with researchers like Béatrice Galinon-Mélénec – with whom she directed her first thesis – and on numerical identity around the idea of an identity mediation and a presence which cannot be reduced to an accumulation of calculated traces. More generally, her work concentrated on behavior in numerical environments and the conditions of a numerical culture. In a conference on "The User's intelligence" for example, employing the theories of usage and the stakes of digital literacy, she sought to demonstrate, from the user to the consumer and the content producer, the multiplicity of the user's role. In the article "Copy and paste", Louise Merzeau proposed a vision that aims at overcoming the simple notions of plagiarism and theft associated with this practice. The notion of paste and copy should not be forbidden: a new learning process of copying as a way of thinking could lead to knowledge, therefore underlying the importance of a pedagogical frame. The copy and paste could be a solution to the commercial logics of the web. This conception is to be put in relation to her engagement in the movement of common goods, in which she participates through the Savoirscom1 collective group, which fights for the user's rights against the risks of informational enclosure. On this subject, she has opened an axe called "numerical common goods" in the university master's "Cultural industries and numerical environments" at the Paris Nanterre university.

In March 2015, Sylvie directed in collaboration with Lionel Barbe and Valérie Schafer the publication of a collective book on Wikipedia.

Her research switches to the notion of editorialisation, that she developed with researchers like Marcello Vitali-Rosati of the University of Montréal and Gérard Wormser of the journal Sens Public. This notion centers the question of traces on writing processes seen as collective interaction and technical contexts.

Louise Merzeau was also involved in web archiving through the workshops on methodological research of legal web deposits at INA, where she supervised scientific aspects from 2010 to her death.

She also has an activity of numeric and creative photography. She became a member of the scientific council of Wikimedia France in 2015, and was coopted as a member of the board of trustees in May 2017.

Sylvie died on July 15, 2017.
