= Elizabeth Burgos =

Venezuelan anthropologist

Elisabeth Burgos (born in 1941) is a Venezuelan anthropologist. She is the editor of Rigoberta Menchú's controversial autobiography I, Rigoberta Menchú. She was director of the Maison de l'Amerique Latine in Paris and of the Institut Cultural Français in Seville.

== Rigoberta Menchú's book ==
Rigoberta Menchú told Burgos her life in a series of interviews. Menchu claims in the book that she could not read or write in Spanish very well. She also adds that her spoken Spanish was poor. For this reason, Burgos took on the role of assembling Menchu's testimony. Menchu's story speaks to her experience as an indigenous woman, as well as atrocities committed by the Guatemalan military.

Menchú's story is considered one of the major texts of Latin American testimonios (testimonies). In the U.S., the title of the narrative went by the name of I, Rigoberta Menchu, and in the original Spanish Me llamo Rigoberta Menchú y así me nació la conciencia. In the text, Burgos also adds quotes from the Popol Vuh, the sacred book of the Mayans. Those epigraphs foreshadow the narrative of the testimonial of Menchu. The translation into English became an international phenomenon.

Menchú claims that following the text receiving the Casas de las Américas prize for best testimonial in 1983 that she did not receive any prize money and learned only then Burgos-Debray had registered copyrights in her own name. However, anthropologist David Stoll supports Burgos-Debray's contention that she paid all royalties to an organization identified by Menchú.

== Personal life ==
Burgos was born in Valencia, Venezuela. Burgos and French philosopher Régis Debray had a daughter, the writer Laurence Debray (born 1976).
