= Civilization: How We All Became American =

2017 book by Régis Debray

- Author: Régis Debray
- Original title: Civilisation. Comment nous sommes devenus américains
- Translator: David Fernbach
- Language: French
- Publisher: éditions Gallimard
- Publication date: 4 May 2017
- Publication place: France
- English publication date: 2019
- Pages: 240
- ISBN: 9782072732409

Civilization: How We All Became American (French: Civilisation. Comment nous sommes devenus américains) is a 2017 book by the French writer Régis Debray. It is about the relationship between contemporary Europe and the United States.

== Summary ==
Débray writes that the past century has seen a reversal of the previous order, where Europe was the centre of civilization to which the United States was a distant offshoot. Debray argues that American civilization forces an obsession with "space, image and happiness" upon Europe, suppressing a European focus on "time and writing", which leads to infantilization and an obscured understanding of tragedy. He writes that Europe still can provide an environment for rich culture, distinct from American dominance, which may be understood as both decadent and liberating.
