= Eugénie Bastié =

French journalist and essayist (born 1991)

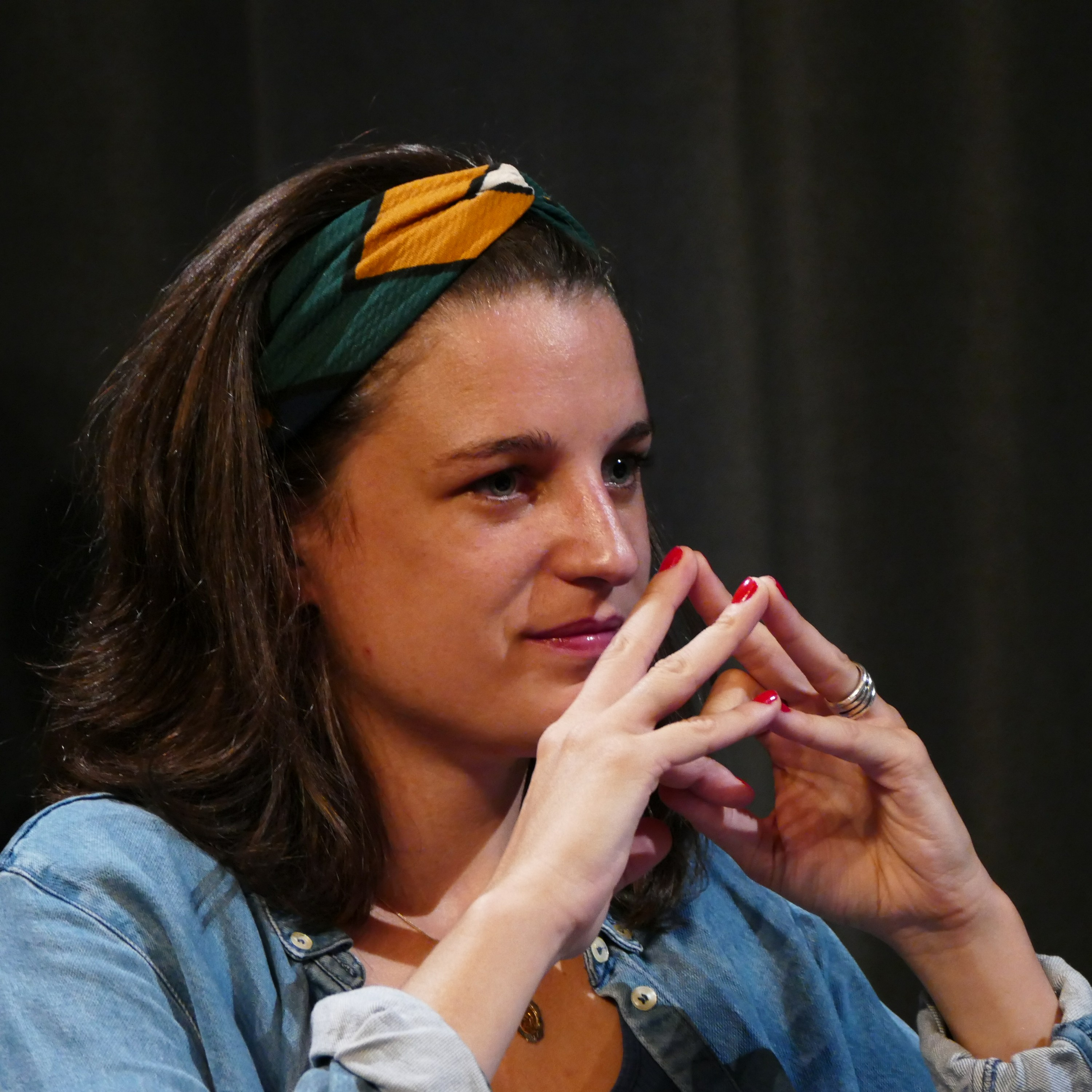
- Bastié in 2017
- Born: Eugénie Bastié; 18 November 1991 (age 34); Toulouse, France
- Education: Sciences Po; Paris-Sorbonne University
- Occupations: Journalist, writer
- Employers: Europe 1 (2022–present); CNews (2020–present); Le Figaro (2014–present); BFM TV (2019–2020); France 2 (2016)
- Awards: Grand Prix de la biographie politique (2026)

Eugénie Bastié (born 18 November 1991) is a French journalist, columnist and essayist. She is deputy editor-in-chief of Le Figaro, where she oversees the newspaper's Champs libres opinion and debate pages. She is also a regular political commentator on French television and radio. Her essays address contemporary feminism, the place of intellectuals in public life, cultural conflict and freedom of thought.

== Early life and education ==
Eugénie Bastié was born in Toulouse on 18 November 1991. She is one of five children raised in a Catholic household, where her father worked as a landscaper and her mother specialised in nuclear medicine. She grew up in the village of Pibrac, near Toulouse.

Bastié was educated at the private, boarding school Saint Jean de Lectoure then attended the Paris Institute of Political Studies, graduating in 2014 with a Master in Public Affairs (MPA). She went on to earn a master's degree in Philosophy at Paris-Sorbonne University.

== Career ==
While still a student at Sciences Po, Bastié began contributing to the French magazine Causeur, with her first article published in December 2012. She completed an internship at Figaro-Vox, the opinion and debate platform of Le Figaro newspaper where she was subsequently hired in 2014. In 2015, she co-launched Limite, a magazine dedicated to Integral Ecology, a central theme of Catholic Social Teaching.

In September 2015, Bastié made a notable appearance on the television program Ce soir (ou jamais!) where she engaged in a spirited debate against Jacques Attali, delving into the topic of refugees and immigration. In April 2016 she published her first essay Adieu mademoiselle (Goodbye Mademoiselle: The defeat of women). In September 2016 she briefly joined the program AcTualiTy, on the French public TV channel France 2. During this time, she also contribute to Historiquement show on the TV channel Histoire and to 24h Pujadas on La Chaîne Info.

In April 2017 Bastié became a columnist on Le Figaro débats et opinions page. In October 2018 she published her second essay Le Porc émissaire : Terreur ou contre-révolution (The Scapepig: Terror or counterrevolution). While promoting the book on a France Inter radio program, she expressed her criticism of what she saw as "excessive victimisation" stemming from the MeToo movement. In 2019 she left Limite, the magazine that she co-founded.

During the 2019–20 season Bastié contributed to the program et en même temps on BFMTV as columnist, she also contributed to the program 19 h Ruth Elkrief, debating current affairs opposing Alain Duhamel. In July 2020 she left the network to become a political commentator on television news channel CNews; In May 2021 Bastié hosted her own show entitled Place aux idées. In September 2021, Bastié joined Face à l'info on CNews, as one of several commentators brought in following the departure of Éric Zemmour.

In 2022, she began presenting Le Club des idées on Le Figaro TV, subsequently known as Le Club Le Figaro Idées, a discussion programme featuring debates with writers, philosophers and other public intellectuals. She also became a commentator on Europe 1, contributing opinion segments to the station's morning programme.

By 2024, Bastié was deputy editor-in-chief of Le Figaro, responsible in particular for the newspaper's Champs libres pages, which feature opinion columns, essays, interviews and analysis.

In October 2026, she participated as an interviewer in the revival of L'Heure de vérité, a political interview programme presented by Caroline Roux on France 2. The first edition, broadcast on 8 October, featured former prime minister Édouard Philippe.

== Essays and intellectual work ==
Bastié’s essays focus on contemporary feminism, relations between the sexes, ideological conflict and the conditions of public debate. In La Guerre des idées: Enquête au cœur de l’intelligentsia française (2021), written after three years of research and interviews with around thirty thinkers from different political backgrounds, she examined the changing role of intellectuals in France and the fragmentation of the country’s intellectual life. In Sauver la différence des sexes and La Dictature des ressentis, both published in 2023, she continued her examination of sex, identity, emotion and individual experience in contemporary political discourse.

In September 2026, Bastié published Le Rouge et le Blanc: Régis Debray et nous (Gallimard), a biographical essay devoted to French philosopher and political intellectual Régis Debray. The book traces Debray's trajectory from revolutionary activism in Latin America to his later role in French political and intellectual life. Through his career, Bastié examines the political ideals and disillusionments of the postwar generation, contrasting Debray's left-wing commitments with her own conservative outlook.

=== Reception ===
Bastié’s essays have attracted attention for their engagement with contemporary cultural and ideological disputes. Le Point described Le Porc émissaire as a “counter-current” examination of the consequences and perceived excesses of the #MeToo movement. Discussing La Guerre des idées, the magazine presented Bastié as an essayist with a taste for intellectual debate and described the book as an examination of French intellectual life that defended debate as a “conflictual conversation”. In a 2021 profile prompted by the same book, Le Temps praised the narrative force of her writing and compared aspects of her intellectual posture to that of Germaine de Staël. In an opinion column published by Le Figaro, Élisabeth Lévy described La Dictature des ressentis as “a small light in the night”.

In March 2023, The Times described Bastié as a "leading French columnist" in its coverage of Sauver la différence des sexes, presenting the essay as part of a wider French debate over biological sex, gender identity and the influence of Anglo-American ideas. Later that month, philosopher Kathleen Stock, writing in UnHerd, discussed the essay in the context of French intellectual and political debates over the social significance of biological sex.

Le Rouge et le Blanc received favourable reviews in Le Figaro, Le Point, Le JDNews, La Croix and L’Express, with critics praising its narrative qualities and exploration of the affinities between Debray and his conservative biographer. On 14 November 2026, Bastié received the Grand Prix de la biographie politique du Touquet-Paris-Plage for Le Rouge et le Blanc: Régis Debray et nous.

== Publications ==
=== Books ===
- Le Rouge et le Blanc: Régis Debray et nous (in French). Gallimard. 2026. ISBN 978-2-07-297378-9. — Winner of the 2026 Grand Prix de la biographie politique du Touquet-Paris-Plage.
- La Dictature des ressentis: Sauver la liberté de penser. Tribune libre (in French). Place des éditeurs. 2023. ISBN 978-2-259-31759-7.
- Sauver la différence des sexes. Tracts (Paris. 2019) (in French). Gallimard. 2023. ISBN 978-2-07-302545-6.
- La Guerre des idées: Enquête au coeur de l'intelligentsia française. Arion (in French). Éditions Robert Laffont. 2021. ISBN 978-2-221-25294-9.
- Le porc émissaire: Terreur ou contre-révolution (in French). Éditions du Cerf. 2018. ISBN 978-2-204-12880-3.
- Adieu mademoiselle: La Défaite des femmes (in French). Éditions du Cerf. 2016. ISBN 978-2-204-10489-0.

=== Contributions to edited volumes ===
- Boutin, Christophe; Dard, Olivier; Rouvillois, Frédéric, eds. (2017). Le Dictionnaire du conservatisme (in French). Éditions du Cerf. ISBN 978-2-204-12358-7. — Entries "Antigone", "Féminisme" and "Limite".
- Boutin, Christophe; Dard, Olivier; Rouvillois, Frédéric, eds. (2019). Le Dictionnaire des populismes (in French). Éditions du Cerf. ISBN 978-2-204-13136-0. — Entry "Virilité".
- Rester vivants: qu'est-ce qu'une civilisation après le coronavirus ? (in French). Fayard. 2020. ISBN 978-2-213-71759-3. — Contributor.
- Buisson, Jean-Christophe; Tabard, Guillaume, eds. (2020). Les Grandes Figures de la droite: de la Révolution française à nos jours (in French). Perrin. ISBN 978-2-262-08810-1. — Chapter "La duchesse de Berry, ou le romantisme ultra".
- Éloge de la politique: les grandes œuvres, de Platon à Soljenitsyne (in French). Tallandier. 2020. ISBN 979-10-210-4354-1. — Chapters on Charles Péguy's Notre jeunesse and Simone Weil's L'Enracinement.
