= Mediology =

Cultural transmission theory by Régis Debray

Mediology (French: médiologie) is a method for analysing the interactions between technology and culture. This pluridisciplinary intellectual movement, developed at the initiative of the philosopher Régis Debray in the late twentieth century, focuses on the “materialities of the spiritual”, that is, the technical and organic systems through which ideas produce collective effects and are transmitted over time.

== Definition ==
Mediology (etymologically, the "discourse on means" or the "study of mediations") seeks to address the following questions. How do certain "products of the mind (religions, doctrines, ideologies, academic disciplines)" become "material forces" capable of changing the political, economic or military functioning of a society, rather than remaining merely "inside people's heads"? How does the emergence of a technology (a means of transportation, writing or recording) durably transform the mentalities, worldviews, conceptions of space and time, and behaviour of a human group? How does an institution respond to a technological innovation? How does a culture influence the adoption and adaptation of a new technology?

In "mediology", medio does not refer to media or medium, but to "mediations", that is, the dynamic ensemble of procedures and intermediary bodies that stand between the production of signs and the production of events.

— Régis Debray, Manifestes médiologiques

Regarding his interest in mediations, Debray writes: "When the wise man points at the moon, the fool looks at the finger... The mediologist will be a meticulous fool, and his approach a reasoned foolishness." By examining the interactions between technology and culture through the analysis of technical apparatuses and institutions, mediology seeks to distinguish itself from semiotics, which studies signified and signifier, neglecting somewhat the question of the material medium of transmission. At the same time, it seeks to avoid the technological determinism associated with Marshall McLuhan's dictum "The medium is the message".

An innovation does not mechanically produce a belief or an institution, but may constitute a sine qua non condition for its emergence, following a period of maturation during which the technology spreads and gradually transforms social practices.

Debray illustrates this causal relationship in God: A Trajectory. Materials for a History of the Eternal in the West (2001). He links the emergence of monotheism to the invention of alphabetic writing and the possibility of fixing sacred texts on portable scrolls. Writing thus makes conceivable an abstract and universal God, detached from local material representations.

Similarly, the printing press made the Protestant Reformation possible and, in combination with other technological inventions, contributed to the emergence of modern nation-states and Marxist ideology.

== Origins and precursors ==
"Mediology" is a neologism that first appeared in 1979 in Le Pouvoir intellectuel en France ("Intellectual Power in France"). In its opening sentence, Régis Debray announces that he is preparing a "treatise on mediology". The meaning of the term, still somewhat vague at this stage, appears narrower than the one it would later acquire. In the context of his analysis of the intelligentsia, mediology refers to the study of the means by which opinions are manufactured.

In this book, Honoré de Balzac is presented as the "founding father" of mediology. Debray singles out two passages from Lost Illusions. The first is Étienne Lousteau's monologue in the Jardin du Luxembourg, in which the journalist explains to Lucien de Rubempré the socioeconomic foundations of Parisian cultural life. The second is the soirée at Florine's, which illustrates how this system operates.

Régis Debray subsequently developed and broadened his definition of mediology to encompass symbolic productions as a whole—including religions, ideologies, arts and sciences—and the material conditions (technical and institutional) underlying their emergence and their transmission and transformation.

In the late 1980s, mediology became the subject of a course at Stendhal University in Grenoble, followed by a seminar at the Collège international de philosophie in Paris, co-directed with Daniel Bougnoux. In 1991, Debray published Cours de médiologie générale, setting out the foundations of his intellectual approach. After completing his doctoral thesis in philosophy at the Sorbonne, he founded Les Cahiers de médiologie in 1996, a journal to which several dozen authors contributed.

Mediologists identified numerous intellectual precursors, writers and philosophers whose work anticipated certain "mediological" insights. For instance, Régis Debray has frequently cited a passage from Victor Hugo's novel The Hunchback of Notre-Dame (1831).

The archdeacon gazed for some time in silence at the gigantic edifice, then, with a sigh, extended his right hand towards the printed book lying open on his table and his left towards Notre-Dame, casting a sorrowful glance from the book to the church: — Alas! he said, this will kill that.

Victor Hugo then interrupts the narrative to comment at length on the archdeacon Claude Frollo's remark. He explains that, until the end of the Middle Ages, architecture had been the principal medium for the transmission of human thought, before being displaced in this role by the printing press. By replacing the monumental, locally situated book of stone with the printed book, which could be reproduced and circulated, Johannes Gutenberg's invention profoundly transformed society.

In tracing mediology's intellectual genealogy, Régis Debray also identified two writers from the interwar period: Paul Valéry (The Conquest of Ubiquity, 1928) and Walter Benjamin, who quotes Valéry at the beginning of his 1936 essay The Work of Art in the Age of Mechanical Reproduction.

Mediology draws on other precursors from the second half of the 20th century, including Walter J. Ong and Marshall McLuhan in North America, and the French prehistorian André Leroi-Gourhan and philosopher Gilbert Simondon. Régis Debray's thought also shares significant affinities with that of his contemporaries Jacques Derrida, Roland Barthes, Jean Baudrillard, François Dagognet, Bernard Stiegler and Pierre Lévy.

== Main concepts ==
=== Mediaspheres ===
A mediasphere is a cultural environment technically shaped by the modes of transportation across space and time prevailing at a given point in history. Within a mediasphere, the transmission and circulation of ideas and knowledge take place.

Régis Debray distinguishes three major mediaspheres: the logosphere, which emerged with the invention of writing and is characterised by the predominantly oral transmission of rare and sacred texts; the graphosphere, which emerged with the invention of the printing press; and the videosphere, which emerged with the advent of audiovisual media.

In his doctoral thesis "Life and Death of the Image: A History of the Gaze in the West" (1993), Debray distinguishes three regimes of vision: the magical gaze, associated with the logosphere and the idol (understood as an intermediary with the supernatural world); the aesthetic gaze, associated with the graphosphere and the work of art; and, finally, the economic gaze, associated with the videosphere. According to this periodisation, the successive functions of the image have been survival, pleasure and information.

A rupture, he observes, occurs between film, which maintains a distinction between the image and the world beyond the screen, and television, whose image tends to present itself as the world itself.

Mediaspheres and regimes of vision overlap and coexist, with new technical arrangements reorganising older ones.

A fourth category, the hypersphere, was subsequently introduced by mediologist Louise Merzeau to designate the digital environment.

The "average time of symbolic diffusion" is measured in centuries for the logosphere, years for the graphosphere, hours for the videosphere and seconds for the hypersphere. These technical environments determine the capacity of discourses to circulate throughout society. Debray gives the example of critical rationalism, whose transmission he considers limited in the logosphere, facilitated by schooling and print in the graphosphere, but once again hindered in the videosphere (and hypersphere), where the speed of circulation and the predominance of affect tend to disadvantage argumentative coherence.

Debray emphasises that this periodisation is a schematic typology intended to identify broad trends in the evolution of systems of transmission. On its own, it does not account for the diversity of historical situations or the specific temporalities of cultural movements.

=== Technology and mediation ===
Technology refers to "any skill, performance or invention that is not encoded in the genetic programme of the species".

Mediology conceives of mediation as the articulation of two dimensions: a technical dimension ("organised matter") and an organisational or political dimension ("materialised organisation"). Supports and tools—the alphabet, the book, the road or the bicycle—are effective only when embedded in institutions, communities and sites of production, such as schools, postal services, libraries and religious orders, which disseminate and legitimise them.

=== Communication and transmission ===
Institutions vary in the extent to which they specialise in communication, understood as the circulation of information across space, or in transmission, understood as its passage through time and between generations (the media communicate, whereas schools transmit).

=== The jogging effect ===
Innovations can give rise to the resurgence of archaic practices, or to "regressive progress", through which cultures compensate for or resist changes in the technological environment that occur too rapidly. Régis Debray calls this phenomenon the "jogging effect", alluding to the paradoxical enthusiasm of car owners for running. To prevent muscular atrophy, human beings take up exercise in parks or gyms, using machines and treadmills.

== Mediologists ==
Hundreds of authors contributed (some on a single occasion and others on a regular basis) to Les Cahiers de médiologie, a biannual journal published by Gallimard between 1996 and 2004, and subsequently to the quarterly journal Médium, published by Éditions Babylone between 2004 and 2019.

Among them were : Régis Debray, Jacques Derrida, Jean Baudrillard, Michel Serres, Bruno Latour, Marc Fumaroli, Ernest Pignon-Ernest, Claude Lanzmann, Pierre Haffner, Pierre Nora, Pierre Vidal-Naquet, Peter Sloterdijk, Louise Merzeau, François-Bernard Huyghe, Serge Tisseron, Françoise Gaillard, François Dagognet, François Cusset, Bernard Stiegler, Jean Clair, Jean-Michel Frodon, Pierre Lévy, Rony Brauman, Michel Onfray, Michel Tabachnik, Maryvonne de Saint-Pulgent, François de Closets, Pierre Assouline, Renaud Girard, Vincent Desportes, Gilles Kepel, and Dominique de Villepin.

The list above focuses on contributors who have an article on the English-language Wikipedia, rather than on those who contributed most frequently.

Between 2019 and 2023, mediologists, including Régis Debray, continued to publish articles on a blog hosted on the website of the magazine Marianne.

== Reception and criticism ==
=== France ===
In his essay On Television (1996), the sociologist Pierre Bourdieu mocked the "self-proclaimed holders of a science that does not exist, mediology", whom he criticised for drawing categorical conclusions before conducting any empirical research.

Régis Debray sought to clarify the matter by explaining that mediology differs from media studies and "does not claim the status of a science, still less a 'new' one". He presents it instead as a crossroads of research bringing together philosophers, historians of technology and scholars in communication studies.

Yves Jeanneret described mediology as an "antidiscipline" that is difficult to fit into established academic categories, and whose practitioners may be criticised by specialists for treating their subjects too superficially. He identified an ambiguity in mediological thought between technological determinism and the interdependence of technology and culture. He also pointed to the difficulty of reconciling Debray's broad historical periodisations with the empirical analysis of practices.

Despite the introduction of a mediology course at the Sorbonne University in 2007, mediology has not achieved the status of an autonomous academic discipline. A 2016 article in Le Monde attributed this limited reception to Régis Debray's public persona and to the resistance of the academic establishment to a multidisciplinary approach. In 2024, Daniel Bougnoux similarly observed that "the graft did not take", attributing this failure to the fact that Régis Debray "did not play the university game".

=== English-speaking world ===
The screenwriter Yvette Bíró claimed to have discerned "traces of a strong, vulgar Marxist school of thought" in Debray’s doctoral thesis (Wide Angle magazine, Vol.18, No.1, January 1996).

Canadian scholar Imre Szeman acknowledged the value of mediology while criticising Régis Debray's tendency to elevate the technical conditions of transmission into a general principle of historical explanation, without always providing sufficient evidence for the causal relationships he proposes. He also accused Debray of overstating the originality of his theoretical approach and overlooking earlier contributions by Raymond Williams and other theorists of cultural studies.

An article by Steven Maris in Fibreculture No.12 similarly suggests that Debray is too firmly embedded in "the French academic scene" and that his explicit engagement with other national scholarly traditions of media, communications and cultural studies in the works mentioned above is "minimal". Maris also notes that mediology "predates much of the [current academic] interest in networked cultures and new media".

Mediology became more widely known in the English-speaking world with the translation of some key texts, such as Debray's Transmitting Culture (University of Columbia Press, 2004).

The New Dictionary of the History of Ideas (2004) wrote of Debray that "His achievement is to have synthesized these earlier arguments into a practice with a powerful political project ahead of it." (Vol.4, page 1394).

== See also ==
- Communication studies
- Walter Benjamin
- History of technology
- History of ideas
- Memes
- Memetics
- Cultural behavior
- Cultural selection theory
- Cultural reproduction
- Evolutionary epistemology
- Tipping point (sociology)
- Taste (sociology)
- Diffusion of innovations
