= Atlantic Union =

Proposal to unite democratic nations into a federal union

Atlantic Union was the most common name for the proposal, originally advanced by journalist Clarence Streit in 1939, to unite the world's leading democratic nations into a federal union, in much the way the thirteen states united in 1789 under the U.S. Constitution.

== History ==
For many years an Atlantic Union Resolution was introduced every session in the U.S. Congress, by Rep. Paul Findley, Donald Fraser, and Morris Udall as the lead co-sponsors, to call an "Atlantic Convention" which its proponents hoped would draft a constitution to be submitted for ratification to the countries represented. In 1960, the resolution finally passed and the convention was held, but President Lyndon B. Johnson, who was not a supporter of the concept, did not appoint supporters of federation as the U.S. delegates, so nothing came of the convention except a broadly-worded resolution calling for "greater cooperation".

The idea of Atlantic Union had its origin in the brain of an Englishman named Cecil Rhodes. To this end he established the Rhodes Foundation, providing for the education in England of bright young Americans.

In 1939, a Rhodes Scholar named Clarence Streit wrote a book called Union Now, which advocated a gradual approach to final world union by way of regional unions, starting with the union between the US and Britain. Committees were set up all over America, and Mr. Streit reported that over two million Americans had signed petitions asking for union with Britain.

In Streit's own words, the Atlantic Union, now expanded to include Western Europe, was the first step towards total world government: "It [Union Now] proclaimed the need of world government and insisted that no country needed this more urgently than the United States." Streit, who has been a close associate of Communists and socialists all his adult life, had no hostility towards collectivism. He said in Union Now: "Democracy not only allows mankind to choose freely between capitalism and collectivism, but it includes Marxist governments." In his pamphlets Streit asks the question: "Does the rise of socialism in some Western European democracies prevent our federating with them?" He answers with an emphatic "No!"

In March 1949, Federal Union set up a political-action unit called the Atlantic Union Committee. The first president of this Committee was former Supreme Court justice Owen J. Roberts, who said he considers national sovereignty a "silly shibboleth."

The work for Atlantic Union is being worked towards by the Streit Council.

== See also ==
- Community of Democracies
- European Union (EU)
- North American Union
- North Atlantic Treaty Organization (NATO)
- United States of the West
