= Régis Debray =

French philosopher (born 1940)

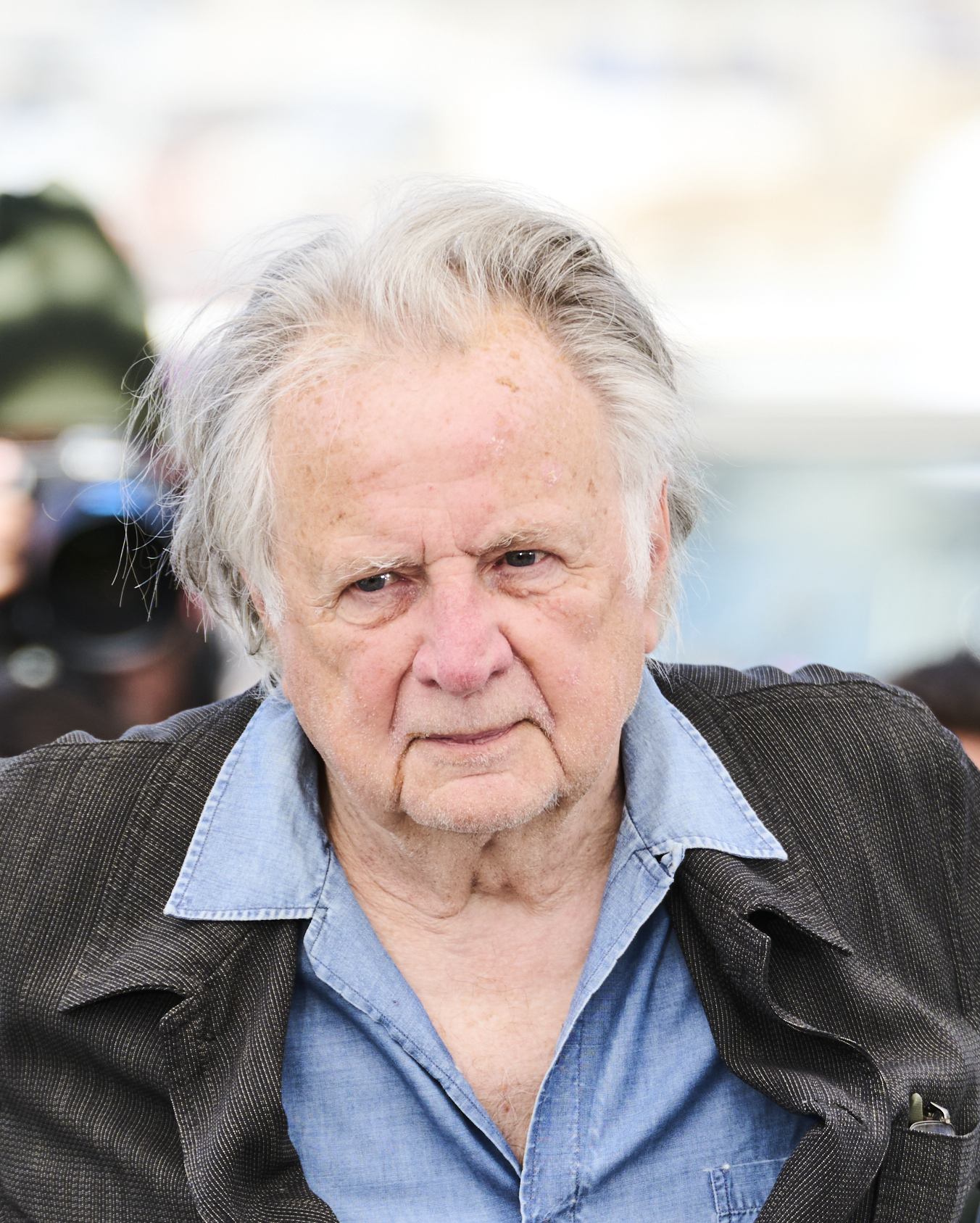
- Debray at the 2026 Cannes Film Festival
- Born: 2 September 1940 (age 86); Paris, Occupied France
- Education: École normale supérieure Panthéon-Sorbonne University
- Occupations: Writer, civil servant, journalist, academic
- Writing career
- Language: French
- Genres: Essay, novel, autobiography
- Subjects: Philosophy, religion, cultural transmission, politics, international relations

Régis Debray (French: [ʁeʒis dəbʁɛ]; born 2 September 1940) is a French writer and philosopher.

A revolutionary activist in his youth, he took part in the Bolivian guerrilla led by Che Guevara in 1967. He was arrested, tried by a military tribunal and sentenced to thirty years in prison. President Juan José Torres granted him amnesty in 1970. Following his release, he supported Salvador Allende’s socialist government in Chile. During François Mitterrand’s first presidential term, he served as an adviser on relations with countries of the Third World.

Debray is the founder of mediology, an approach to analysing the interplay between technology and culture.

== Early life ==
=== Family background ===
Régis Debray was born in Paris on 2 September 1940 into an upper-class family. Both his parents were lawyers at the Court of Appeal of Paris. His mother, Janine Alexandre-Debray (1910–2000), served as vice-president of the Paris Municipal Council and later as a senator. His maternal grandfather was of Jewish descent ; during the Nazi occupation of France, his mother was required to obtain a certificate of "Aryan ancestry.".

He is the nephew of child psychiatrist Pierre Debray-Ritzen.

=== Childhood ===
Born shortly after the Fall of France, Debray was staying in the Poitou region with his grandmother at the time of the Liberation. He watched the SS Division Das Reich retreat while armed with a wooden sword.

He was raised a Catholic but abandoned his belief in God in the mid-1950s. His political awakening was shaped by the wars of decolonisation. He wept because of the French army's defeat at the Battle of Dien Bien Phu. At the age of sixteen, he became a communist and supported the Algerian independence.

=== Education ===
Debray ranked first in the entrance examination to the École normale supérieure in 1960, where he studied under the neo-Marxist philosopher Louis Althusser.

At the age of twenty, he appeared in the cinema verité movie Chronique d'un été by Jean Rouch and Edgar Morin, who filmed him denouncing French public opinion's acquiescence in the Algerian War. He developed a Third-Worldist outlook, influenced by his reading of Alejo Carpentier's Explosion in a Cathedral and Frantz Fanon's The Wretched of the Earth.

Debray became an agrégé de philosophie in 1965 and taught at a secondary school in Nancy for three months, before leaving to pursue revolutionary activity in Latin America.

== Revolutionary in Latin America ==
In 1961, Régis Debray first visited Cuba, travelling there from the United States after the Bay of Pigs Invasion. He took part in a literacy campaign in the Sierra Maestra..

Two years later, sent by Les Temps modernes, the magazine edited by Jean-Paul Sartre, he embarked on an eighteen-month journey across South America. In Venezuela, he met his wife Elizabeth Burgos and filmed guerrilla fighters with Peter Kassovitz.

His article published in Les Temps modernes attracted the attention of Che Guevara. Debray was invited by Fidel Castro to attend the Tricontinental Conference, held in Havana in January 1966.

Officially a professor at the University of Havana, Debray grew closer to Castro and joined the Punto Cero training camp. In September 1966, he was sent to the Alto Beni region in northern Bolivia to assess its suitability for establishing a rural guerrilla base. He submitted his report to Manuel Piñeiro, head of the Cuban intelligence services. (Note: The reconnaissance mission aroused the suspicions of the Bolivian Communist Party (PCB). The Cubans sought to replicate in Bolivia the guerrilla foco strategy: clandestinely establish an armed force, initiate armed struggle, and make the guerrilla the nucleus around which a revolutionary movement could gradually develop. The PCB, following the leninist tradition, argued instead that the Bolivian revolution should be prepared politically and based on existing social organisations, particularly the labour movement and mining unions. Mario Monje, the PCB's leader, met Guevara on 31 December 1966. Monje agreed in principle to support the guerrilla campaign but sought to retain political and military control, arguing that a revolution fought on Bolivian territory should be led by Bolivians. Guevara categorically rejected this demand. The resulting break led the PCB leadership to withdraw its official support, depriving the guerrilla force of a major source of recruits.) The area was eventually abandoned in favour of Ñancahuazú, where Che Guevara arrived in November 1966.

In January 1967, Debray published Revolution in the Revolution?, an argument in favour of the foco strategy developed by Che Guevara. Fidel Castro read it before publication. The book was published in Spanish by Casa de las Américas, with a print run of 300,000 copies, and was broadcast on Cuban radio. Several editions in other languages soon followed.

Debray returned to Bolivia on 28 February 1967 under the codename "Danton". He was to act as an intermediary between Fidel Castro and Che Guevara. Along with the Argentine Ciro Bustos, he joined the Ñancahuazú guerrilla on 6 March. In his Bolivian Diary, Guevara noted on 21 March that the Frenchman wished to remain with him. Two days later, the guerrillas ambushed Bolivian soldiers, several of whom were killed. On 27 March, Guevara wrote that Debray and Bustos should leave promptly, adding: "I have the impression that Danton was not at all pleased when I told him." The following day, Guevara noted that Debray was now insisting "too vehemently" on the usefulness he could have outside the guerrilla camp. Opportunities to leave dwindled as the Bolivian army tightened its encirclement.

On 20 April, Debray, Bustos and George Roth, a British reporter who had arrived the previous day and whom Guevara distrusted, left the group and reached the village of Muyupampa, where they were arrested by soldiers. Debray claimed to be a journalist, but he was covered in insect bites, and his razor still bore long hairs, suggesting that he had been living in the jungle and had only recently shaved off a guerrilla's beard. The soldiers found documents they considered incriminating in his bag, including cartographic materials. It was also alleged during the trial that he was carrying a list detailing army casualties in the guerrilla ambushes.

=== Detention and trial ===
Following his arrest, Debray was imprisoned in Camiri. For two days, Bolivian soldiers beat him severely and threatened to kill him. (Note: When visited by legal representatives of the International League for Human Rights in late August, he told them that he had lost consciousness under the beatings. He added that an intelligence officer had held a pistol to his temple for about twenty minutes. In Les Masques (p. 93), Debray describes extremely violent beatings and threats of execution, but writes that he was "fortunate not to have been systematically tortured".) CIA agents subsequently arrived to interrogate him. According to Jean Lartéguy, Debray narrowly escaped an extrajudicial execution. (Note: The first alleged attempt occurred during his transfer from Muyupampa to Camiri, under the pretext of a supposed escape attempt, which his transport by helicopter reportedly prevented. A second alleged plot involved relatives of Bolivian soldiers killed by the guerrillas, who supposedly intended to shoot him with the complicity of certain guards. According to Lartéguy, a man disguised as a police officer was arrested near the prison.)

He was held incommunicado for two months, without access to a lawyer or representatives of his country's embassy. Reports of his death circulated in the media. (Note: As his trial approached, Debray told reporters: "Those interrogating me showed me a newspaper saying that I was dead and told me with a smile: ‘If we make the news come true, what difference will it make?’") The French ambassador in La Paz obtained confirmation of his imprisonment on 26 April. In Paris, his mother appealed to Charles de Gaulle – the Debray family had connections to the Vendroux family, that of Yvonne de Gaulle – who sent a message to General René Barrientos Ortuño, president of Bolivia, asking him to spare the young man's life.

An international campaign was quickly organised to obtain information about the prisoner's situation and demand respect for his rights. Dozens of prominent figures, including writers, academics, politicians and religious leaders, joined the campaign. In Britain, Bertrand Russell accused the CIA of having ordered the detention of journalist Régis Debray and demanded either his immediate release or his appearance before an ordinary court. In the United States, academics at Harvard University and the MIT signed petitions calling for his rights to be respected C. L. Sulzberger of The New York Times described the Frenchman as "hippie" whom the Bolivians should release.

General Barrientos rejected these appeals. He declared that "Régis Debray's adventures will end here" and announced that he was considering reinstating the death penalty for insurgents. The Bolivian authorities denied that the Frenchman had been tortured and stated that a trial would be held in due course.

After two months in detention, Debray received his first outside visitor on 21 June: Andrés Kennedy, the American apostolic vicar of La Paz, who was related to Senator Robert F. Kennedy. The latter had reportedly conveyed to Bolivian leaders the concern that the case had generated on both sides of the Atlantic. A fortnight later, his mother was granted permission to visit him in Camiri. A press conference was authorised as the trial approached. His defence was handled by the court-appointed Bolivian lawyer Raúl Novillo, assisted by Debray’s father and three legal observers from the International League for Human Rights.

The trial opened in Camiri on 26 September 1967. Debray appeared alongside Ciro Bustos; the journalist George Roth had been released. The families of soldiers killed in the ambushes joined the proceedings as civil parties. Four Bolivians who had deserted the guerrillas were also tried. Before the case file had been read in full or witnesses heard, military prosecutor Colonel Remberto Iriarte delivered an impassioned indictment, describing Debray as "a cynical and cruel bandit" who had organised the guerrilla campaign theorised in his book Revolution in the Revolution?. Iriarte demanded the maximum sentence of thirty years' imprisonment.

The military court regarded Debray as an agent acting on behalf of Fidel Castro. The defence, by contrast, presented him as an observer and a writer working on a journalistic assignment. This account was supported by François Maspero, his Paris publisher, who had travelled to Bolivia and was eventually expelled from the country in July; Jean-Paul Sartre, editor of Les Temps modernes; and the Mexican weekly Sucesos.

As the trial proceeded, the hunt for Che Guevara reached its conclusion. The Bolivian army captured and executed him on 9 October 1967. Debray then sent a letter to the court. He wrote that the guerrilla leader's death "did not mark the end of the anti-imperialist struggle, but its beginning" and that Guevara was "immortal, because he will live in the heart of every revolutionary". The only reason he had not taken up arms, he added, was that Guevara had asked him to organise support from outside. "My greatest sorrow today is that I did not die by his side," he wrote. Debray later told AFP: "For me, Guevara's adventure was a mystical adventure, and the last months of his life were a passion, his revolutionary passion. He irresistibly evoked the image of Christ."

On 17 November 1967, the military court in Camiri delivered its verdict. It sentenced Debray and Ciro Bustos to thirty years' imprisonment for rebellion, murder, violence and theft. The four Bolivian co-defendants, who had testified against them, were acquitted. The defence challenged the ruling and filed an appeal for annulment, alleging several violations of the Bolivian Constitution and military penal code.

=== Controversy over Che Guevara's death ===
At the end of the trial, Colonel-prosecutor Remberto Iriarte claimed that the Frenchman had "rendered the Bolivians a great service" by revealing Che Guevara's presence in the jungle. Indignant at what he called this "outrageous" accusation, Debray told journalists after his conviction that the army had known of Guevara's presence since March, having obtained the information from several sources. These included the acquitted deserters Choque, Barrera and Rocavado, followed by Jorge Masquez, a guerrilla fighter captured by the army who was executed after being tortured. Masquez had reportedly confided information to a CIA agent while in hospital. Ciro Bustos allegedly spoke afterward. According to Debray, he had merely acknowledged Guevara's presence, saying, he "was the sixth to do so."

A declassified CIA cable dated 10 May 1967 partially corroborates this account, although it does not specify that Debray was the sixth person to provide such information.

On 30 June 1967, upon hearing on the radio that General Ovando had publicly disclosed his presence in Bolivia, Che Guevara wrote in his Bolivian Diary: "He bases this on Debray's statements, who seems to have spoken more than he should have, although we cannot know exactly what this amounts to, or under what circumstances he said what he appears to have said." On 10 July, Guevara reproached Bustos and Debray for revealing the guerrilla campaign's continental objectives.

In the preface to the 1968 edition of the Bolivian Diary, Fidel Castro nevertheless praised Debray's "firm and courageous attitude" in the face of his captors.

According to Debray, CIA public-relations advisers had suggested to the Bolivian military that they portray him as the betrayor of Che Guevara, in order to discredit him in the eyes of international public opinion. In 1989, former CIA officer Félix Rodríguez claimed that "it was Debray's testimony, in fact, that helped convince the Agency to lay on a concentrated effort to capture the elusive revolutionary".

In August 1996, Che Guevara's daughter, Aleida Guevara, accused Debray of having been responsible for her father's capture. The accusation came after the French writer had broken with Fidel Castro. He had condemned the excesses of the Cuban regime in 1989, following the executions of his friend Antonio de la Guardia and General Arnaldo Ochoa. He had also published Loués soient nos seigneurs, in which Guevara is portrayed as a sectarian and authoritarian figure whose conduct in Bolivia was, at the very least, imprudent. Aleida Guevara rejected Debray's suggestion that her father had deliberately rushed towards martyrdom.

The accusation was not officially endorsed by the Castro government. In 1998, Manuel Piñeiro, the former head of Cuban intelligence, stated that it would be wrong to hold Debray responsible for the guerrillas' location, let alone for Guevara's death. Piñeiro instead accused Ciro Bustos, who had produced drawings while in detention, including a portrait of Guevara. Jorge Castañeda Gutman, Mexican Secretary of Foreign Affairs, and Harry Villegas, a fellow guerrilla fighter of Guevara, likewise believed that Bustos had betrayed the group.

In 2001, a Swedish documentary by Erik Gandini and Tarik Saleh suggested that Bustos had been blamed in order to exonerate Debray. Gary Prado, the commander of the Bolivian unit that captured Guevara, stated: "For us, it was never important to know who spoke first. But among the military, it is well known that it was Debray. I read all the interrogation records myself. From the beginning, he confirmed that Che Guevara was in Bolivia and said that he had come only as a journalist to interview him."

In 2003, Pacho O'Donnell wrote in his biography of Che Guevara that the guerrillas had been forced to divide their forces to allow Debray and Bustos to leave, and that they were unable to regroup effectively. Convinced that the Debray had reached an understanding with his interrogators, O'Donnell brought renewed attention to a letter the Frenchman had written to his lawyer, previously published by a Bolivian newspaper in 1968. The letter referred to a promise made to the military not to disclose Guevara's presence to the press. Other witnesses confirmed that Debray had cooperated, including a CIA agent who described him as "loquacious".

In 2006, Fidel Castro reiterated in his Biografía a dos voces that he had sent Debray on a mission to Bolivia and held nothing against him.

As long as the Bolivian archives remain closed, it is impossible to establish precisely what was said to the interrogators or to assess the value of any information supplied for counterinsurgency operations. The affair cannot be reduced to a simple story of betrayal. The failure of the Ñancahuazú Guerrilla and Guevara's capture resulted primarily from his misjudgements on the ground, his poor relations with the Bolivian Communist Party, communication difficulties with Cuba, and his persistence after the situation had become desperate.

It is possible that the international campaign in support of Régis Debray indirectly contributed to the Bolivian army's decision not to spare Che Guevara's life, in order to avoid a trial that would attract widespread international attention.

=== Imprisonment and release ===
A few weeks after the verdict, in January 1968, General Barrientos raised the possibility of exchanging Régis Debray for Huber Matos, a political prisoner in Cuba, before withdrawing the proposal. The idea was also rejected by Fidel Castro.

In February 1968, Debray married Elizabeth Burgos in a civil ceremony in Camiri. He was permitted to see his wife for ten days every three months, for half an hour each day. A French consular official could visit him once a month in the presence of a Bolivian officer. His correspondence was censored, and Marxist literature was prohibited. Having decided not to appeal his conviction before a military court, Debray attempted a hunger strike in the summer of 1968 to protest against his conditions of detention. His visitors became concerned about his health.

In the autumn of 1969, following General Barrientos's death and General Ovando's seizure of power, writers André Malraux, François Mauriac and Jean-Paul Sartre published a letter to the new Bolivian president, asking him to grant Debray an amnesty. They described him as "a thinker of great worth, one of the most gifted of his generation". An international campaign in his support followed, with hundreds of prominent figures joining the appeal, from Pablo Picasso and Charlie Chaplin to Igor Stravinsky and Laurence Olivier.

In Bolivia, Debray received support from trade unions and students. The revolutionary council of the University of La Paz appointed him "professor of the chair of Marxist philosophy".

In October 1970, General Ovando was overthrown in a coup and General Torres took power. The new president announced that he was considering an amnesty for the two prisoners held in Camiri, although the military's more right-wing factions opposed the measure. Following lengthy diplomatic efforts by France under President Georges Pompidou, Debray was released on 23 December 1970, after three years and eight months in captivity. He was expelled to Chile with Ciro Bustos aboard a Bolivian military aircraft.

=== Chile ===
Debray spent some time recovering at Pablo Neruda's home. He befriended President Salvador Allende; in Miguel Littín’s film Compañero Presidente, the two men discuss the experience of the Popular Unity government and contrast the Guevarist conception of revolution with Allende's "Chilean way to socialism", based on gaining power through institutional means.

Debray returned to Cuba in 1971, where he briefly resumed military training. However, he now criticised the foco strategy he had helped theorise. He acknowledged that he was wrong to believe that an armed vanguard could, by itself, set a revolutionary process in motion. He first drafted a text in Havana in 1971 drawing lessons from the activities of the Tupamaros in Uruguay. He then published in 1974 a detailed analysis of armed-struggle campaigns in Venezuela, Bolivia, Uruguay and Guatemala

=== Klaus Barbie ===
In 1972, Debray joined Serge and Beate Klarsfeld in their efforts to bring to justice Klaus Barbie, a former head of the Gestapo in France who had taken refuge in Bolivia. Faced with difficulties in securing his extradition, they considered abducting him, taking him to Chile and then handing him over to the French authorities. The clandestine operation involved Monika Ertl and other opponents of Bolivian president Hugo Banzer. It failed: Ertl was captured, tortured and executed in May 1973. The possibility of using Chile as a transit point for Barbie's removal disappeared after the Pinochet coup, while the request for Barbie's extradition was rejected.

Debray left Chile shortly before the coup d'état of 11 September 1973 orchestrated by the CIA. He met Allende in August and published an account of their final conversation in Le Nouvel Observateur. He portrayed the president as aware of the gravity of the situation and pursuing a strategy intended to buy time in the face of the military threat.

== Adviser to François Mitterrand ==
After returning to France, Debray became involved with François Mitterrand, whom he advised from the 1974 presidential campaign onward, although he never joined the French Socialist Party. After Mitterrand's electoral defeat, he accompanied him to Cuba to meet Fidel Castro.

In the summer of 1979, Debray travelled to Nicaragua to support the Sandinistas in their struggle against Somoza. He took part in the capture of Managua.

=== At the Élysée Palace ===
After François Mitterrand was elected president of France in May 1981, he appointed Debray as a special adviser responsible for relations with the Third World. According to Hubert Védrine, Debray worked "feverishly" to revive the Latin American policy pursued by Charles de Gaulle. Together with his friend Jorge Castañeda, Mexico's Secretary of Foreign Affairs, he helped initiate a Franco-Mexican declaration recognising the political legitimacy of the FMLN and calling for non-interference in the internal affairs of El Salvador. The initiative irritated Washington. Richard V. Allen, national security adviser to Ronald Reagan, telephoned Jacques Attali at the Élysée Palace and, half-jokingly, asked whether France intended to send troops.

In September 1981, Debray was received discreetly at the White House by Richard V. Allen, who remarked that the Americans could also fight imperialism, namely French imperialism in Africa.

Debray's appointment at the Élysée attracted controversy in the United States. He was on the American intelligence services' blacklist because of his links to the Cuban regime and his role as an ideologue of guerrilla movements. He was also in contact with Philip Agee, a former CIA officer who had publicly disclosed the names of former colleagues and was collaborating with the Cubans.

According to Pierre Joxe, Debray was highly influential with Mitterrand during the early months of his presidency. He pressed for covert aid to be provided to Latin America's far left. At his request, the French intelligence agency reportedly helped members of the MIR escape from Chile.

In early autumn 1982, the fall of Bolivia's dictatorship made the extradition of Klaus Barbie to France possible. Debray, whose plan to abduct the nazi war criminal had failed a decade earlier, immediately contacted Gustavo Sánchez, the new interior minister. On 5 February 1983, Barbie was extradited to France in exchange for an arms shipment to Bolivia.

==== Gradual break with Mitterrand ====
The French president began to set aside Debray's advice on South America, particularly after a visit to Washington in March 1983. Hubert Védrine later recalled: "No more dreaming! He didn’t want a few sympathetic Latin American or Third Worldist lobbies to jeopardise the methodical work he had carried out over the past ten months to avoid Anglo-Saxon ostracism."

Mitterrand reportedly explained his position to Debray in these terms: "You can't fight on two fronts, Régis, domestic and foreign. Having Communists in the government, even at the far end of the table, is already hard for Reagan and big business to stomach. If I also take on America head-on, I become Allende. Is that what you want?"

Debray's assignments were then redirected towards the Pacific. In June 1983, while in Australia, he invited foreign scientists to visit Mururoa Atoll, where France conducted nuclear tests.

In early 1985, Debray left the Élysée to become a Master of Requests at the Council of State. A year later, Mitterrand appointed him secretary-general of the South Pacific Council, created to defend French interests in the region after the Rainbow Warrior Case.

Debray unsuccessfully sought to lead the commemorations of the French Revolution bicentenary, a position awarded to Jean-Noël Jeanneney. (Note: Debray was, however, appointed to work with Paul Virilio and Bernard Stiegler on the French Pavilion at the 1992 Universal Exposition.) He finally left the Élysée after Mitterrand's re-election in 1988. Their break was motivated by Debray's opposition to the creation of supranational European institutions. Before leaving, he refused to write the speech for the transfer of Jean Monnet's remains to the Panthéon.

In his resignation letter from the Council of State, dated 28 December 1992, Debray wrote: "There would first have to be a state left to advise. What is the point of serving something that no longer serves any purpose? Why tend a body whose soul is fading?"

Although he retained private affection for François Mitterrand, Debray started criticizing him publicly. In comparison with General de Gaulle, he wrote, Mitterrand was a tactician whose sole objective was to hold on to power, without a vision for France in the twenty-first century.

In Loués soient nos seigneurs (Praised be our lords), published shortly after Mitterrand's death, Debray offered a disillusioned assessment of the relationship between intellectuals and political power. He explained the reasons for his support of the leader of French socialism in 1973, after returning from Salvador Allende's Chile. He had seen Mitterrand as a potential figure capable of reconciling the revolutionary heritage of the left with the national independence associated with Gaullism. This projection had led him to downplay Mitterrand's ideological ambiguities, his past under the Vichy regime and his role during the Algerian War.

According to Debray, Mitterrand favoured intuition, style and political manoeuvring over the pursuit of truth and long-term perspectives. He possessed remarkable practical intelligence but he lacked a coherent worldview. Debray regretted the failure of his attempts to bring the president closer to academics and researchers. Mitterrand preferred small talk and the company of mondain writers to substantive intellectual discussions.

Rather than "changing life" as promised, the fourteen years of Mitterrand's pragmatic presidency produced more conventional outcomes: democratic alternation in power and a reshaping of the elites. His election enabled former dissidents to enter the establishment and transformed the activist left into a force of government motivated by individual ambitions.

Mitterrand's exercise of power was one of Stoic detachment. He inspired loyalty without making himself dependent on those around him and knew how to separate outward displays of emotion from political calculation. By seeking to keep all the levers of power in his hands and leave everyone uncertain, he blurred responsibility and fostered secrecy and opacity. Debray argued that the president ultimately hindered administrative and diplomatic action.

Finally, Debray accused Mitterrand of diminishing the sacred character of republican institutions. Whereas General de Gaulle maintained a strict distance between his personal life and his role as head of state, Mitterrand prolonged and staged his presidential farewells. The highest office, which was meant to transcend the personal interests and moods of its holder, was reduced to his private life

== Political ideas ==
Debray's experience in Latin America confronted him with the strategic limitations of armed struggle as a means of achieving international revolution. (Note: In 1967, Debray observed that the Cuban victory had strengthened counter-revolutionary forces. The United States and Latin American governments had developed their counterinsurgency capabilities through military training, intelligence gathering, infiltration of clandestine organisations and police coordination. Guerrilla movements that replicated Cuban tactics without accounting for this new environment were therefore far more vulnerable and likely to fail. These armed vanguards lacked preparation, ideological maturity and political roots. They took up arms without sufficient coordination, while Communist parties often remained committed to electoral and trade-union activity. The compartmentalisation of revolutionary movements across national borders compounded the problem: revolutionary experiences circulated poorly, leading activists to repeat mistakes already made elsewhere. Without a durable organisation capable of building popular support, voluntarism and audacity alone could not create the conditions for revolution.) The inability of Che Guevara's Bolivian Guerrilla to win the support of the peasantry and proletariat reinforced his understanding that "the concrete analysis of the concrete situation" required taking geographical, political and cultural realities into account, rather than reducing them to class struggle alone.

He became particularly aware of the importance of national identity. Revolutions, he concluded, had historically been associated with struggles for national liberation or patriotic defence. His four years in prison, 6,000 miles from his homeland, gave him time to reflect on this question. (Note: He came to believe that patriotism was not inherently reactionary, provided that French history was understood as containing both a republican and revolutionary tradition, exemplified by the Battle of Valmy, the Paris Commune and the French Resistance, and a colonial imperialism that had made him ashamed of being French.) "I discovered that I was French in Latin America," he later explained. After his release, this realisation gradually led him away from Marxism–Leninism towards what he would call "far-left Gaullism".

Although Debray continued to support revolutionary movements in Latin America into later life, (Note: These included the Sandinistas in Nicaragua in 1979 and, in 1996, the Zapatistas in Chiapas, where he visited their leader, Subcomandante Marcos.) his political position in France, following his return in 1973, centred on promoting a form of republican socialism. This led to his involvement with François Mitterrand, as well as his subsequent disillusionment.

=== NATO ===
In Empires against Europe (1985), Debray analysed the decline of the Soviet Union compared to the more attractive and less overtly coercive American power. He criticised the intellectual influence exercised over Western European elites by the Atlantic alliance through the networks it had established. In his view, Washington was the principal obstacle to European strategic autonomy.

Debray argued that the collapse of the Soviet bloc risked making the old continent more dangerous by reviving national and identity-based conflicts in Eastern Europe. He anticipated, in particular, the resurgence of "Holy Russia".

Since the end of the Cold War, Debray has systematically opposed NATO's military operations, including the Gulf War, the intervention in Bosnia, the bombing of Yugoslavia and the war in Afghanistan.

He has been on the American intelligence services' blacklist since his involvement in Che Guevara's Bolivian guerrilla campaign. His diplomatic passport temporarily allowed him to circumvent the restriction under François Mitterrand, but in the spring of 2001, while travelling to Boston for a series of lectures, he was stopped at the airport and deported from the United States.

Following the September 11 attacks, Debray published The Edict of Caracalla. Xavier de C***, a fictional former senior French civil servant who became an American citizen, argues for incorporating the European imperial province into the "United States of the West", to better counter Islamists and China.

Debray challenged the conclusions of a report commissioned by President François Hollande on France's return to NATO's integrated military command, a decision announced by President Nicolas Sarkozy in 2007. Whereas Hubert Védrine argued that reversing the decision would not give France any new levers of influence, Debray advocated complete withdrawal from the Atlantic alliance, while remaining “non-aligned allies” of the United States. He argued that NATO, whose command structure and strategic priorities are dominated by the United States, perpetuates European military weakness rather than compensating for it. In his view, the alliance complicates relations with Russia, undermines the UN and limits France's diplomatic freedom of action towards countries in the Global South. He maintained that NATO membership risks drawing France into conflicts that do not serve its national interests.

=== European Union ===
Dissatisfied with France's integration into a supranational Europe, Debray opposed the Maastricht Treaty. He instead advocated selective cooperation among European nations in the fields of industry, diplomacy, and defence, with French nuclear deterrence playing a major role, in keeping with the Gaullist tradition. He considered it dangerous to place "the fiction of Europe above the fiction of France".

In 2019, in a pamphlet entitled The Panthom Europe, Debray offered a scathing assessment of the European Union's political state, describing it as a "gloomy bureaucratic maze" without a historical horizon. He recalled the spiritual foundations of the European project: the blue flag bearing twelve stars, associated with the Virgin Mary, draws on the Book of Revelation, giving the project an eschatological dimension. The "founding fathers of Europe" were steeped in Christian—and predominantly Catholic—culture. These original references, he argued, have been forgotten, leaving behind a desacralised financial and legal structure incapable of fostering a sense of belonging to a community sharing a common destiny.

=== French Republic ===
In Long Live the Republic (1989), Debray criticised the consensual tone of the commemorations of the French Revolution bicentenary. In his view, presenting the Revolution as a completed process, definitively incorporated into the national heritage, effectively neutralised its political significance. The Republic, he argued, requires a commitment to social transformation and a continuing struggle for equality in order to survive. He urged the left to recover a revolutionary and militant ethos rather than indulge in what he described as self-satisfied moralising.

He argued that the left in power had not only abandoned socialism but also relinquished the very idea of the Republic; that it had become excessively liberal and managerial, increasingly influenced by political communications advisers and show business. He denounced the dominance of money, opinion polls and statistics, arguing that "the obsession with figures turns government into an airline pilot who mistakes a weather report for a flight plan".

==== Television and the Yugoslav Wars ====
Debray criticised television as an "air conditioner" of public opinion shaping the conduct of political leaders. In the "videosphere", public figures derive their legitimacy from their access to visibility.

During the Yugoslav Wars, he accused some media-savvy pseudo-intellectuals of substituting moral indignation and humanitarian spectacle for realistic strategic analysis. These "big-hearted simplifiers", repeating NATO's elements of language, called for Serbian positions to be bombed and for weapons to be supplied to the Bosniaks without considering the risks of escalation and retaliation, or the consequences for the populations they claimed to defend. They framed the conflict as a struggle between good and evil without having to bear the consequences themselves, demanding sacrifices from others.

Debray highlighted the gap between the instantaneous circulation of images of massacres and the government's limited capacity to act.

==== Laïcité and public education ====
Debray advocated a secular republic founded on the transmission of a common heritage and civic ideals through the school system. He distinguished this republican model from American-style liberal democracy, in which individualism and consumerism—somewhat tempered by religion—rule society.

In 1989, during the first major controversy over the Islamic scarf controversy in France, Debray and others intellectuals published an open letter to Education Minister Lionel Jospin. They argued that discipline should not be confused with discrimination and regretted that "respect for gender equality and free will" no longer seemed to govern public life in France.

Debray was a founding member of the Comité Laïcité République, established in 1991 at the initiative of the Grand Orient de France. This "watchdog committee" sought to counter what it regarded as a growing trend towards the fragmentation of society into separate communities, which it considered a threat to the Republic.

During the 2002 presidential campaign, Debray submitted a report to the government in witch he proposed to teach religious studies in secular schools, in order to provide pupils with analytical tools to understand history, literature and art. He advocated moving from a "secularism of incompetence" to a "secularism of understanding". His conclusions were rejected by the Grand Orient de France, which feared that they might call the 1905 law on the separation of Church and State into question.

Following Debray's proposal, the European Institute for Religious Studies was established to train teachers. Debray chaired its committee until 2004, when he resigned in protest at what he regarded as the French education system's inertia in implementing the teaching of religious matters.

==== "Far-left Gaullism" ====
In the aftermath of Nicolas Sarkozy’s election, Debray analysed in The Democratic Obscenity the political arena's transformation in the age of the "videosphere". He deplored the lack of culture among politicians of the French Fifth Republic, whom he regarded as communications professionals with no remaining historical awareness.

In 2010, he published In Praise of Borders. Like a membrane, simultaneously open and closed, a border serves to protect and differentiate: it filters exchanges and separates while remaining traversable, unlike a wall, thereby making reciprocity and coexistence possible.

Some of Debray’s positions have led commentators to place him among the "new reactionaries". His Euroscepticism, which he has shared with the far right since the debates over the Maastricht Treaty, has appealed to supporters of the Front National. More broadly, his nostalgia for a bygone era has resonated with the conservative right. The former revolutionary activist frequently appears in the pages of Le Figaro; Eugénie Bastié has devoted a book to him.

Debray nevertheless continues to describe himself as a proponent of "far-left Gaullism". Welcoming the creation of the New Anticapitalist Party and the Left Front, he expressed support for Jean-Luc Mélenchon in the 2012 and 2017 presidential elections.

==== Americanization ====
Debray interpreted the election of Emmanuel Macron, a "Gallo-American" candidate for a "startup nation", as a sign of the hegemony of American values and the advent of a globalized "neo-Protestantism", in which individuals’ worth is defined by their financial success.

In Civilization: How We All Became American, he contrasts a European civilization shaped by time—transmission and memory—with an American civilization structured by space—communication and mobility. Americanization, visible in everyday practices, is profoundly transforming European societies through cultural hybridization. He compares it with other processes of acculturation throughout history, such as the one that followed the Roman conquest of Greece.

Debray was the first to propose that the remains of Josephine Baker, an African-American entertainer and member of the French Resistance, be transferred to the Panthéon, in order to "bring the Republic into tune with the times". The proposal was carried out by Emmanuel Macron in 2021.

=== Memory conflicts ===
During Jacques Chirac’s second presidential term, Régis Debray was entrusted with two missions abroad.

==== Haiti ====
In 2003, at the request of Dominique de Villepin, Debray chaired a committee tasked with examining and making recommendations on Franco-Haitian relations. Jean-Bertrand Aristide had asked France to repay Haiti’s independence debt—compensation for former slaveholders, forcibly imposed by King Charles X in 1825. Debray’s committee rejected the demand on legal grounds while acknowledging the need to address the historical legacy. It recommended a policy of aid rather than repayment.

Following the coup d’état of February 2004, Aristide accused Debray of having taken part in a Franco-American conspiracy to overthrow him. Debray acknowledged meeting Aristide to tell him that he had "lost power" and should leave. He denied, however, conspiring against him.

==== Israel ====
In 2006, Jacques Chirac assigned Debray a mission concerning religious coexistence in the Middle East. Following an idea proposed by François Maspero, Debray retraced the route taken by Jesus as described in the Gospels. In A Naïve Visitor in the Holy Land (2008), which recounts his journey through Israel, the Palestinian territories, Egypt and Lebanon, he examines how religious and national identities are rooted in contested territories.

In 2010, he published a Letter to an Israeli Friend, addressed to Élie Barnavi, followed by Barnavi’s response. Debray deplores the political dominance of Likud and expresses concern about a form of "autism" regarding the Palestinian question. In his view, war has become a source of national cohesion for Israelis, who see themselves as engaged in perpetual conflict with enemies deemed irreconcilable. The traumatic memory of persecution and the Holocaust, he argues, cannot indefinitely dictate the contemporary conduct of the Jewish state towards its Arab neighbours.

== Philosophy ==
Régis Debray is the founder of mediology.

In 1993, he completed a PhD in philosophy at Paris 1 Panthéon-Sorbonne University under the supervision of François Dagognet, with a thesis entitled "Life and Death of the Image: A History of the Gaze in the West". The following year, he obtained a qualification to supervise doctoral research. The examining committee included the philosopher Michel Serres, who gave him a hard time, and the historian Jacques Le Goff.

He was appointed a professor at Jean Moulin University Lyon 3 in 1999.

=== Reflections on the sacred ===
In Critique of Political Reason (1981) and many of his ulterior essays, Debray examines the symbolic beliefs that underpin social cohesion. His starting premise is that, in order to create a sense of collective belonging that endure over time and across space, a human group must refer to an abstract principle external to itself. He compares this "incompleteness" to that of arithmetic systems, as demonstrated by Kurt Gödel.

This need for a social "keystone" was long fulfilled by God and later by principles such as the Nation, the Republic, the People and the Revolution. These enable individuals to form a collective "we" by providing coherent narratives through which they can situate their lives. Both a church and a nation-state have founding figures, "exemplary dead", symbols, rituals and promises for the future.

In nation-states, the material forms of secular sacredness may be places—such as the Tomb of the Unknown Soldier, the Panthéon or the crypt at Mont Valérien for the French Republic, and Lenin's Mausoleum for the Soviet Union—or objects, such as the dollar bill and the manuscripts of the Declaration of Independence and the United States Constitution.

Sacred places are surrounded by reverence and ritual; entering in them produces a "change of state". To varying degrees, this phenomenon may apply to landscapes (Mount Sinai), places of worship (Western Wall), sites of remembrance (Yad Vashem) or places of power, such as courthouses.

==== Contemporary transformations of the sacred ====
The sacred prohibits sacrilege and can justify sacrifice. When sacralization no longer concerns Nature and the things that materially sustain life—the sun, water, fire, earth and plants—but instead attaches to ideas or historical figures embodying a community, it inevitably generates conflict. The history of civilizations is thus marked by successive, antagonistic and short-lived forms of sacredness: kings are no longer anointed in France, and it is likely that a thousand years from now people will no longer sing La Marseillaise or feel the need to ensure that the Unknown Soldier’s flame never goes out.

In Debray’s view, contemporary France is experiencing an exhaustion of its historical sacred symbols. The memory of the French Resistance is fading as those who took part in it disappear. The death in 2021 of the last Compagnon de la Libération signal the passing of a generation that still embodied a grand national narrative.

Debray also asks whether the memory of the Holocaust will retain the same symbolic power after the last survivors have died. At the beginning of the 21st century, he argues, it remains the principal sacred "rallying point" in the Western world: "you don’t sell pancakes outside the Auschwitz gate". Even in a society dominated by mockery, there are still things that must not be laughed at.

Alongside the question of transmission, there is also the problem of the coexistence of competing forms of sacredness. Globalization brings into contact communities that rank values differently and recognize different prohibitions. This was illustrated, for example, by the Charlie Hebdo shooting and the subsequent international reactions. The de-Christianized West treats human rights as sacrosanct and regards sexism and homophobia as forms of sacrilege, while much of the world remains attached to a non-material, divine transcendence.

Modernization, Debray observes, is accompanied by a paradoxical return of archaic forms. Grand historical narratives fade away, civic passions and universalist ideologies lose their intensity, while older, deeply rooted ethnic and religious identities re-emerge.

In The Green Century (2020), Debray examines new forms of sacredness conveyed by environmentalism. Western civilization had been built around the transition from Nature to History: mastering nature and shaping its own future. It now finds itself dependent on an environment whose balance it has disrupted and whose resources it has depleted. Nature consequently tends to become once again the encompassing framework around which collective values, fears and representations are organized. Debray describes this as a transition from "Faustian man" to "green man", concerned with preserving life. In his view, the risk posed by this "ecological neopaganism" is a shift from anthropocentrism to a misanthropic "biocentrism".

== Literature ==
The doors of the Académie française were opened to him, but he never deigned to put himself forward and pay the customary visits to the "Immortals."

In 2011, he was elected a member of the Académie Goncourt, which awards France’s most prestigious literary prize. He resigned four years later, explaining that he did not want to become a literary establishment figure and that, at his age, he preferred to reread masterpieces

Régis Debray was a close friend of Julien Gracq, who had declined the Prix Goncourt. Until the writer's death, Debray frequently visited him in Saint-Florent-le-Vieil.

He laments the breakdown of ties between generations and the hold exerted by audiovisual and instantaneous communications. In his view, impatience and declining attention spans jeopardize the transmission of the national cultural heritage, particularly its language.

He suffered a stroke in 2021 and was left with cognitive impairments that hinder his ability to follow a line of reasoning. To adapt his writing, he favors aphorisms.

== Personal life ==
In 1963, Régis Debray met Elizabeth Burgos in Caracas. She later accompanied him to Cuba. They married in February 1968, while he was imprisoned in Bolivia. After returning to France in 1973, they stayed at the home of Simone Signoret on Place Dauphine in Paris..

They had a daughter, Laurence Debray, born in 1976. After their divorce, Régis Debray dedicated a book to his nine-year-old daughter, whom he had with him on weekends. Starting from a promise to watch the return of Halley's Comet with her in 2061, he reflects on parental love and the brevity of human life on an astronomical timescale. He also wrote about his relationship with Elizabeth Burgos and their separation (Masks: An Education in Love). Laurence Debray recounts her parents' story and her childhood in Hija de revolucionarios (2017).

In 1995, Régis Debray met his second wife, Isabelle Ambrosini, who helped him organize the work of the mediologists. They had a son, Antoine, born in 2001 and baptized at Saint-Sulpice Church in Paris. In Bilan de faillite (Balance Sheet of Failure), parodying the language of business, Régis Debray advised his seventeen-year-old son against writing or entering politics. Antoine Debray has since joined a research laboratory specializing in quantum optics.

In 2024, Isabelle Debray published Dans l'ombre (In the Shadow) in which she reflects on her husband.

== Honours ==
Régis Debray declined to be awarded the Legion of Honour by French President François Mitterrand and his successors.

=== Literary awards ===
- Prix Femina for his novel La neige brûle (1977)
- Prix Novembre for his autobiographical account Loués soient nos seigneurs (1996)
- Prix du livre politique for his autobiographical account Par l'amour de l'art (1998)
- Prix Montaigne de Bordeaux for his essay Un candide à sa fenêtre (2015)
- Grand Prix de Littérature de l'Académie française for his entire body of work (2019)

== Bibliography ==
=== Books ===
In French:

- Révolution dans la révolution ? : Lutte armée et lutte politique en Amérique latine [essai](Paris, Maspero, 1967, series: Cahiers libres)
- La Frontière, suivi de Un jeune homme à la page [littérature] (Paris, Le Seuil, 1967, series: Écrire)
- Nous les Tupamaros, suivi d'apprendre d'eux (Paris, Maspero, 1974, series: Cahiers libres)
- La guérilla du Che (Paris, Le Seuil, 1974, series: Histoire immédiate)
- L'Indésirable [littérature](Paris, Le Seuil, 1975)
- Les rendez-vous manqués (pour Pierre Goldman) [littérature] (Paris, Le Seuil, 1975, series: Combats)
- Journal d'un petit bourgeois entre deux feux et quatre murs [littérature] (Paris, Le Seuil, 1976)
- La neige brûle [littérature] (Paris, Grasset, 1977) Prix Femina
- Le pouvoir intellectuel en France (Paris, Ramsay, 1979)
- Critique de la raison politique (Paris, Gallimard, 1981, series: Bibliothèque des idées)
- La Puissance et les Rêves (Paris, Gallimard, 1984)
- Comète ma comète [littérature] (Paris, Gallimard, 1986)
- Christophe Colomb, le visiteur de l'aube, suivi des Traités de Tordesillas [littérature] (Paris, La Différence, 1991, series: Les voies du Sud: histoire)
- Contretemps : Eloge des idéaux perdus (Paris, Gallimard, 1992, series: Folio actuel)
- Trilogie "Le temps d'apprendre à vivre" I: Les Masques, une éducation amoureuse [littérature] (1992)
- Vie et mort de l'image : une histoire du regard en Occident (Paris, Gallimard, 1992, series: Folio actuel)
- L'État séducteur: les révolutions médiologiques du pouvoir (Paris, Gallimard, 1993)
- L'œil naïf (Paris, Le Seuil, 1994)
- Manifestes medialogiques (Editions Gallimard, 1994)
- Contre Venise [littérature](Paris, Gallimard, 1995, series: Folio)
- A demain de Gaulle (Paris, Gallimard, 1996)
- La République expliquée à ma fille (Paris, Le 1998)
- L'abus monumental (Paris, Fayard, 1999, series: L'abus monumental)
- Shangaï, dernières nouvelles [littérature] (Paris, Arléa, 1999)
- Trilogie "Le temps d'apprendre à vivre" II: Loués soient nos seigneurs, une éducation politique [littérature] (2000)
- Trilogie "Le temps d'apprendre à vivre" III: Par amour de l'art, une éducation intellectuelle [littérature] (2000)
- Dieu, un itinéraire : matériaux pour l'histoire de l'éternel en occident (Paris: Odile Jacob, 2001, series: Champ médiologique; Paris, Odile Jacob, 2003, series: Poches Odile Jacob; Prix Combourg 2003)
- L'Enseignement du fait religieux dans l'école laïque: rapport au ministre de l'Education nationale (Paris, Ministère de l'éducation nationale, 2002)
- L'édit de Caracalla ou plaidoyer pour des Etats-Unis d'occident (Paris, Fayard, 2002). Written by Debray under pseudonym of "Xavier de C...".
- Le Feu sacré : Fonction du religieux (Paris, Fayard, 2003)
- L'Ancien et le Nouveau Testament à travers 200 chefs-d'œuvre de la peinture (Paris, Presses de la Renaissance, 2003), 2 volumes: Tome I: L’Ancien testament à travers 100 chefs-d’œuvre de la peinture (2003); Tome II: Le Nouveau testament à travers 100 chefs-d’œuvre de la peinture (2003)
- À l'ombre des lumières : Débat entre un philosophe et un scientifique (2003) (Entretien avec Jean Bricmont).
- Ce que nous voile le voile (Paris, Gallimard, 2004)
- Le plan vermeil: modeste proposition [littérature](Paris, Gallimard, 2004)
- Le siècle et la règle. Une correspondance avec le frère Gilles-Dominique o. p. (Paris, Fayard, 2004)
- Julien le Fidèle ou Le banquet des démons [théâtre] (Paris, Gallimard, 2005, series: NRF)
- Sur le pont d'Avignon (Paris, Flammarion, 2005, series: Café Voltaire)
- Les communions humaines (Paris, Fayard, 2005, series: Les dieux dans la Cité - Bibliothèque de culture religieuse)
- Supplique aux nouveaux progressistes du XXIe siècle (Paris, Gallimard, 2006)
- Aveuglantes Lumières : journal en clair-obscur (Paris, Gallimard, 2006, series: NRF)
- Un candide en Terre sainte (Paris, Gallimard, 2008)
- Dégagements (Paris, Gallimard, 2010)
- Que reste-t-il de l'occident ? (Paris, Grasset, 2014). Written by Debray and Renaud Girard.
- Civilisation. Comment nous sommes devenus américains (Paris, Gallimard, 2017).

In English:

- Revolution in the Revolution? Armed Struggle and Political Struggle in Latin America (London and New York, M.R. Press, 1967)
- The Border & A Young Man in the Know (New York, Grove Press, 1968).
- Media Manifestos: On the Technological Transmission of Cultural Forms (London, Verso, 1996).
- Against Venice (Berkeley, Calif., North Atlantic Books, 1999; New York, Pushkin Press, 2001).
- God: An Itinerary (New York, Verso, 2004).
- Transmitting Culture (New York, Columbia University Press, 2004).
- Empire 2.0: A Modest Proposal for a United States of the West by Xavier de C*** (Berkeley, California, North Atlantic Books, 2004).
- Civilization: How We All Became American (London, Verso, 2019).

=== Articles ===
- La Puissance et les Rêves: 3 Intermezzos, translated into English by Sian Reynolds, in Parker, Geoff (ed.), Cencrastus No. 19, Winter 1984, pp. 17 – 22, ISSN 0264-0856
- "This Was an Intellectual". TELOS 44 (Summer 1980). New York: Telos Press

=== Reports ===
- Rapport au Ministre des affaires étrangères M. Dominique de Villepin du Comité indépendant de réflexion et de propositions sur les relations Franco-Haïtiennes - Janvier 2004

.
