= Renaud Girard =

French journalist and writer (born 1955)

- Born: 25 May 1955 (age 71); New York City, New York, US
- Education: École normale supérieure École nationale d'administration
- Occupations: Journalist, writer

Renaud Girard (French pronunciation: [ʁəno ʒiʁaʁ]; born 25 May 1955) is a French journalist and writer. He studied at the École normale supérieure and the École nationale d'administration. He has worked as a war correspondent and written books about the Middle East, geopolitics and international relations.

He is an advocate of political realism. One of his concepts is that of the "principal enemy" (ennemi principal), which constitutes a hierarchy of political priorities. For example, in the Syrian Civil War, he considers the principal enemy to be Sunni jihadists, which makes it acceptable to seek alliances with Shi'a Islamist groups such as Hezbollah. Another concept he uses is that of "blatant evil" (mal flagrant), which creates distinctions between different dictatorships. A dictatorship may be deserving of strong criticism, but at the same time not legitimize mass murder or strive for unlimited expansion, in which case it can not be considered as blatantly evil. This is exemplified by the regimes of Muammar Gaddafi, Saddam Hussein and Bashar al-Assad. On the other hand, Nazi Germany and the Islamic State of Iraq and the Levant are examples which Girard regards as blatantly evil.

Girard describes himself as a realist and is critical of the neoconservative movement, which he sees as a doctrine of trying to impose democracy on other countries by force. He has argued that the United States under President George W. Bush prioritized democracy in Iraq over the prospect of peace, which only lead to failure and took the country further from democracy than it was when the operation began.

== Bibliography ==
- Pourquoi ils se battent ? : Voyage dans les guerres du Moyen-Orient, éditions Flammarion, 2005 ISBN 2080687697, Prix Montyon from the Académie Française
- La guerre ratée d'Israël contre le Hezbollah, éditions Perrin, 2006 ISBN 226202605X
- Retour à Peshawar, éditions Grasset, 2010 ISBN 978-2246765516
- Le Monde en marche, CNRS Éditions, 2014 ISBN 978-2271079916
- Que reste-t-il de l'occident ?, with Régis Debray, éditions Grasset, 2014 ISBN 978-2246851363
- Le monde en guerre. 50 clefs pour le comprendre, Carnets Nord / éditions Montparnasse, 2016.
