= François Dagognet =

French philosopher & academic

François Dagognet (French: [dagɔɲɛ]; 24 April 1924 – 3 October 2015) was a 20th-century French philosopher.

François Dagognet was born in Langres. He studied both science and philosophy, and was a student of Georges Canguilhem. He was Professor of Philosophy at the University of Lyon before becoming Professor of Philosophy at Pantheon-Sorbonne University.

Dagognet wrote extensively on the philosophy of the body.

He died in Avallon.

== Works ==
- Philosophie biologique. Paris: PUF, 1955.
- La Raison et les remèdes, essai sur l’imaginaire et le réel dans la thérapeutique contemporaine. Paris: PUF, 1964
- Gaston Bachelard: sa vie, son oeuvre, avec un exposé de sa philosophie. Paris: PUF, 1965.
- Sur Lavoisier, Cahiers pour l’Analyse, vol. 9 (1968)
- Tableaux et langages de la chimie. Paris: Éditions du Seuil, 1969.
- Écriture et iconographie. Paris: Vrin, 1974.
- Pour une théorie générale des formes. Paris: Vrin, 1975.
- Philosophie de l’image. Paris: Vrin, 1986.
- Le Cerveau citadelle. Le Plessis-Robinson: Les Empêcheurs de penser en rond, 1992.
- Etienne-Jules Marey : a passion for the trace, New York: Zone Books, 1992.
- Georges Canguilhem, philosophe de la vie. Le Plessis-Robinson: Les Empêcheurs de penser en rond, 1997.
- Le Nombre et le lieu. Paris: Vrin, 2000.
- Faces, Surfaces, Interfaces. Paris: Vrin, 2003.
- L’Animal selon Condillac: une introduction au Traité des animaux de Condillac. Paris: Vrin, 2004.
