= Gary Prado Salmón =

Bolivian militant and diplomat (1938–2023)

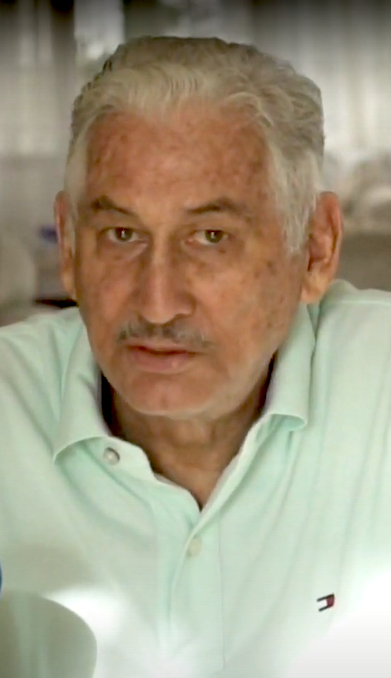
- Prado in 2020
- Born: Gary Augusto Prado Salmón; 15 November 1938; Rome, Italy
- Died: 6 May 2023 (aged 84); Santa Cruz de la Sierra, Bolivia
- Education: Army Military College

Gary Augusto Prado Salmón (15 November 1938 – 6 May 2023) was a Bolivian military officer, diplomat, politician, and academic.

== Biography ==
Born in Rome on 15 November 1938 to Julio Prado Montaño and Adela Salmón Tapia, Prado's family returned to Bolivia at the onset of World War II. He completed his primary studies in Cochabamba and Vallegrande and his secondary studies in La Paz and London. In 1954, he enrolled in the Army Military College, graduating in 1958.

Prado's family moved to Santa Cruz de la Sierra while he took military courses in the United States. He was the captain of a squadron that captured Che Guevara near La Higuera on 9 October 1967. He was not present at Guevara's execution the next day.

From 24 November 1978 to 19 November 1979, Prado was Minister of Planning and Coordination in the cabinet of President David Padilla. From 1990 to 1993, he was Ambassador of Bolivia to the United Kingdom, and from 2000 to 2002, Ambassador to Mexico. In 2012, he was accused by the government of President Evo Morales of having organized a civil war.

Gary Prado Salmón died in Santa Cruz de la Sierra on 6 May 2023, at the age of 84.
