= Guatemala–Spain relations =

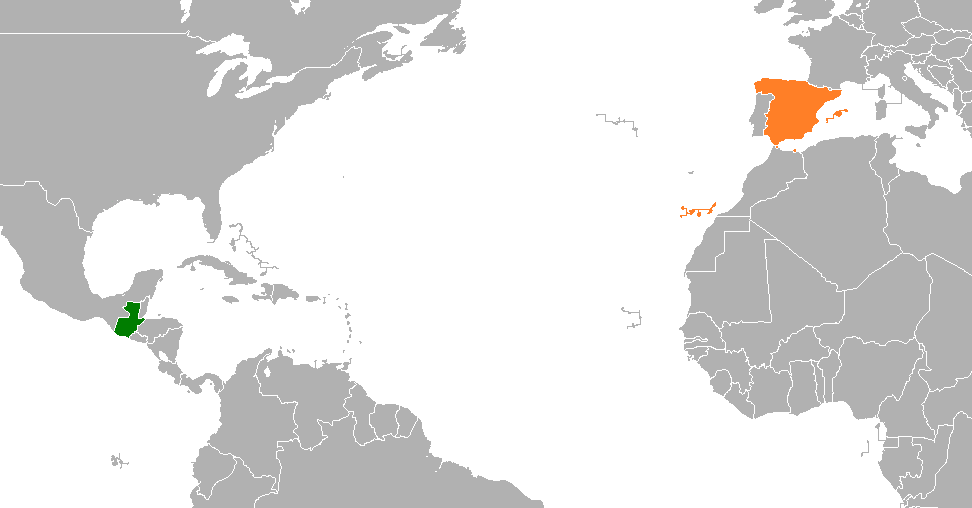
- Guatemala: Spain

Diplomatic mission
- Embassy of Guatemala, Madrid: Embassy of Spain, Guatemala City

Relations between the Republic of Guatemala and the Kingdom of Spain date back to 1524, when the modern territory was conquered by the Spanish. Guatemala achieved its independence in 1821 and established diplomatic relations with Spain in 1863. Both nations are members of the Organization of Ibero-American States and the United Nations.

== History ==
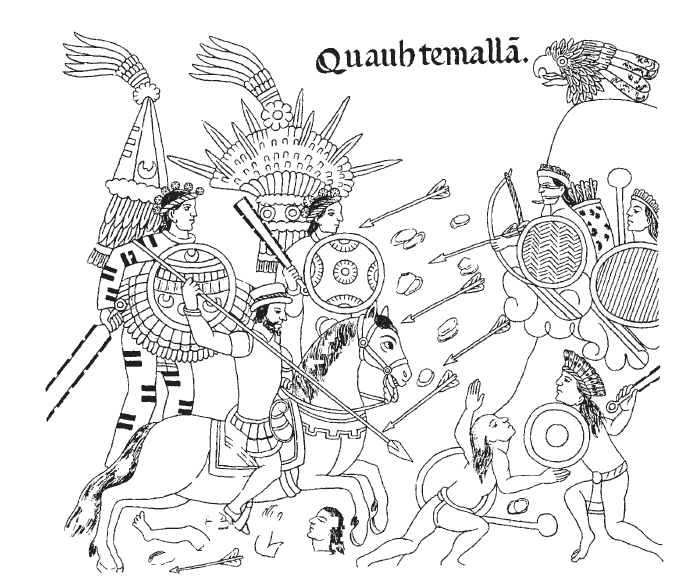
Spanish conquest of Guatemala

=== Spanish conquest ===
The first Spanish troops to arrive to Guatemala were led by Spanish conquistador Pedro de Alvarado in 1524. On arrival to the territory, the Spaniards discovered various peoples of the Mayan and Nahua cultures. The Spaniards, with help of indigenous allies and Tlaxcaltec troops, began to slowly conquer the peoples of Guatemala. The first and major battles involved the Kʼicheʼ people who were defeated in March 1524 and resulted in the capture of the K'iche' capital of Qʼumarkaj. In 1525, Spanish conquistador of the Aztec Empire, Hernán Cortés arrived to Petén to subdue the rebellious Cristóbal de Olid who had been sent to conquer Honduras. Cortés soon returned to New Spain after the battles.

Soon after the conquest of southern Guatemala, the Spanish, in 1557 founded the city Santiago de los Caballeros de Guatemala which was to be the capital of the Captaincy General of Guatemala. Spanish missionaries soon began to Guatemala to convert the native indigenous people to Catholicism. In March 1697, the Spanish fully conquered all of Guatemala for Spain after the conquest of Petén. The Captaincy General of Guatemala became part of New Spain and was governed by the Viceroy of New Spain based in Mexico City.

=== Independence ===
In 1808, Joseph Bonaparte was installed as King of Spain and several Spanish American colonies began to declare their independence from Spain. As Guatemala and most Central American nations were governed by Mexico City; New Spain declared its independence from Spain in 1810. In 1821, the Plan of Iguala which declared Mexico as a constitutional monarchy. Guatemala declared its own independence from Spain on 15 September 1821 and chose to join the Mexican Empire under Emperor Agustín de Iturbide.

In March 1823, Iturbide resigned as Emperor and Mexico became a republic. Guatemala decided to separate from Mexico on 1 July 1823. Guatemala, along with El Salvador, Honduras, Nicaragua and Costa Rica formed the Federal Republic of Central America (with the exception of the Guatemala province of Chiapas which choose to remain part of Mexico in July 1824). In 1839 the Central American Federation dissolved and Guatemala became an independent nation.

=== Post-Independence ===
In May 1863, Guatemala and Spain signed a Treaty of Peace, Friendship and Recognition. During the 1920s, several hundred Spaniards immigrated to Guatemala. In 1960, Guatemala entered into a civil war between the government and various leftist rebel groups supported chiefly by ethnic Maya indigenous people and Ladino peasants. In September 1977, King Juan Carlos I of Spain paid an official visit to Guatemala, his first and only trip as King to the country.

==== Burning of the Spanish Embassy in Guatemala ====
In the early morning of 31 January 1980, a group of Guatemalan peasants from the Committee for Peasant Unity, joined by workers and students, entered the Spanish Embassy in Guatemala City. The protesters announced that they had come to the embassy peacefully and that they would hold a press conference to state their grievances against the Guatemalan government. The protesters choose to enter the Spanish embassy as Spain had been sympathetic towards their cause. At the time the protesters entered, the Spanish Ambassador, Máximo Cajal López was meeting with former Guatemalan Vice-President Eduardo Rafael Cáceres Lehnhoff at the embassy.

The Spanish Ambassador met with the protesters and announced to the government that they hope for a peaceful negotiation to take place. Guatemalan President Fernando Romeo Lucas García and police and government officials immediately met at the National Palace and decided to remove the protesters by force from the embassy. Just before noon that same day, 300 armed state agents surrounded the building and cut the electricity, water and telephone lines. The armed agents entered the building and began to shoot at the protesters who ran to barricade themselves in the various offices. During the commotion, a fire broke out on the second floor of the embassy. As the fire blazed, the police refused to allow volunteers and firefighters to enter the building to save those trapped on the second floor. 37 people died during the fire, including the former vice-president Cáceres Lehnhoff and Vicente Menchú, father of future Nobel Peace Prize laureate, Rigoberta Menchú, as well protesters and Spanish embassy employees. There were only two survivors for the fire, the Spanish Ambassador who narrowly escaped and protester Gregorio Yujá Xona. Both were taken to Herrera Llerandi Hospital for treatment.

On 1 February, 20 armed men entered the hospital and kidnapped Gregorio Yujá Xona. His dead body was later found tortured. On him was a sign stating that the Spanish Ambassador Máximo Cajal López was next. The Ambassador, with assistance from the diplomatic staff left the hospital and fled the country. On 2 February 1980, Spain severed diplomatic relations with Guatemala over the incident at the embassy and the threat on its diplomatic staff.

In September 1984, Guatemala and Spain re-established diplomatic relations. In 1999, Rigoberta Menchú presented charges for torture, genocide, illegal detention and state-sponsored terrorism against former President Ríos Montt and four other retired Guatemalan generals, two of them ex-presidents in Spain as Spain's Constitutional Court ruled in 2005 that Spanish courts can try those accused of crimes against humanity even if the victims were not of Spanish origin. In July 2006, a Spanish judge ordered an arrest warrant for Ríos Montt and others accused of genocide.

== High-level visits ==
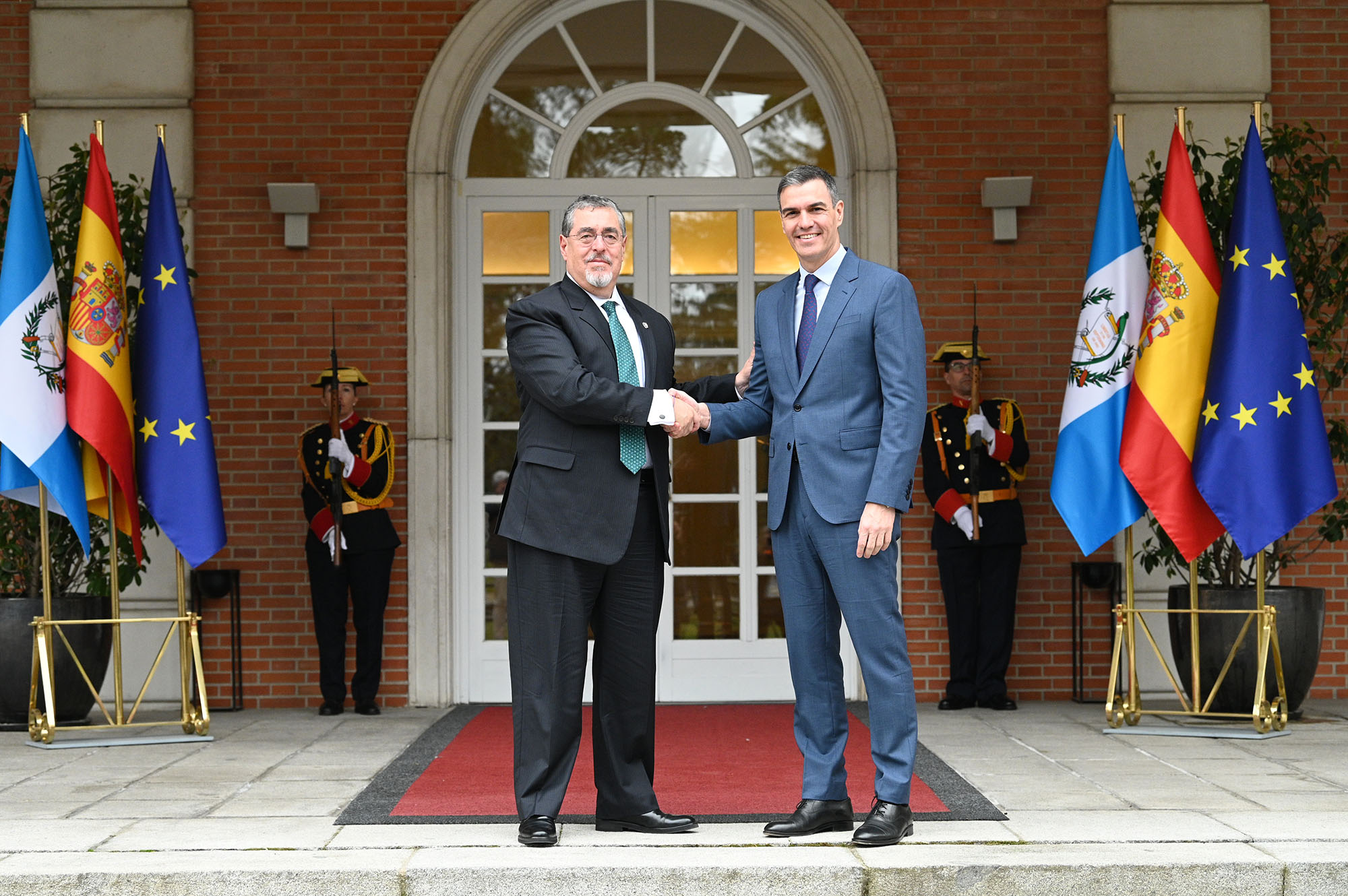
Guatemalan President Bernardo Arévalo and Spanish Prime Minister Pedro Sánchez in Madrid; 2024.

Presidential visits from Guatemala to Spain

- President Vinicio Cerezo (1986)
- President Jorge Serrano Elías (May and July 1992)
- President Álvaro Arzú (1997)
- President Óscar Berger (2004)
- President Otto Pérez Molina (2013)
- President Alejandro Giammattei (2021, 2023)
- President Bernardo Arévalo (2024, 2026)

Royal and Prime Ministerial visits from Spain to Guatemala

- King Juan Carlos I (1977, 2007)
- Queen Sofía (1977, 1996, 2014)
- Crowned Prince Felipe (2004, 2008, 2012)
- Prime Minister Mariano Rajoy (2015)
- King Felipe VI (2018, 2024)
- Prime Minister Pedro Sánchez (2018)
- Queen Letizia (2024)

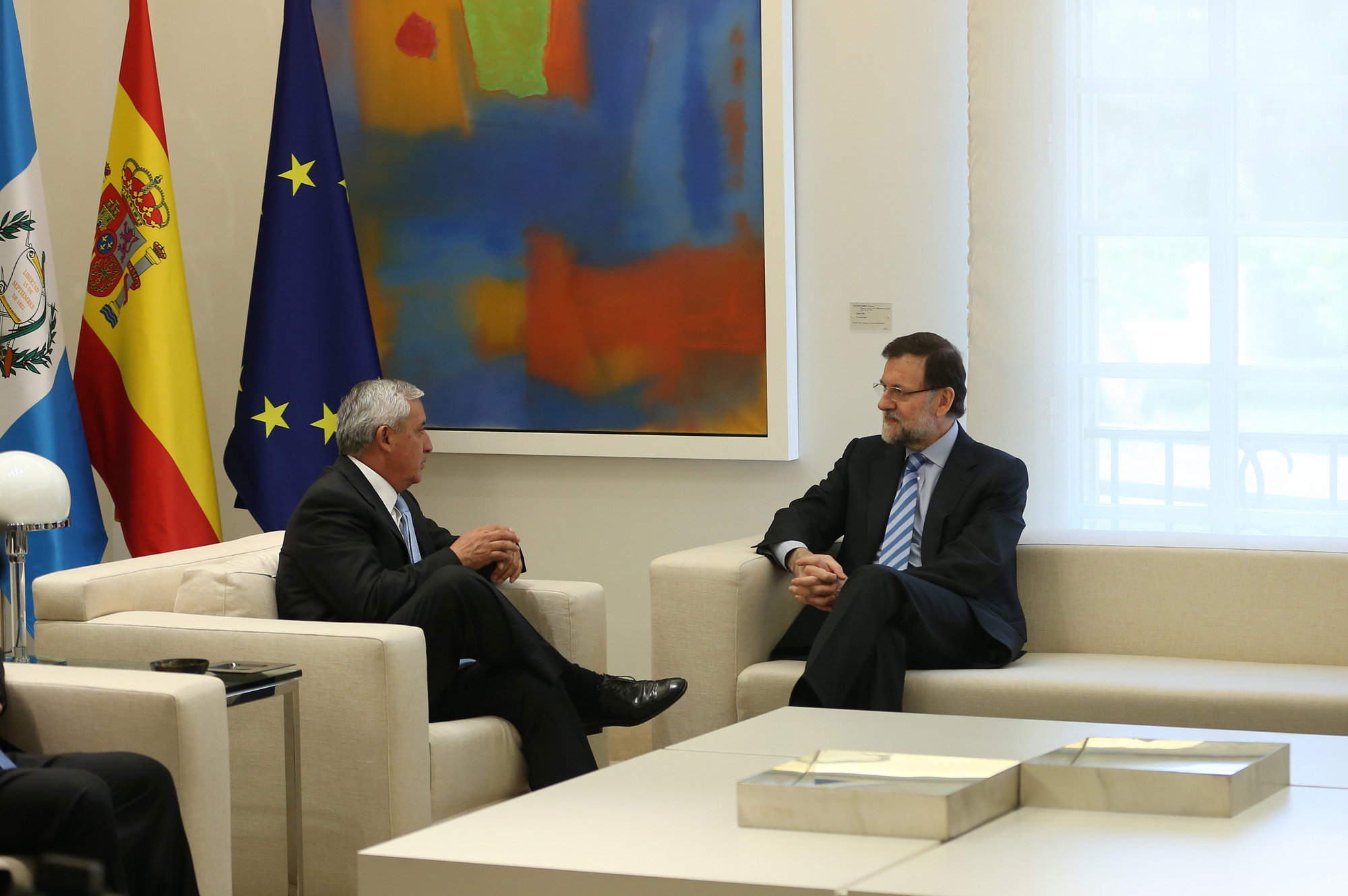
Prime Minister Mariano Rajoy and President Otto Pérez Molina in Madrid; 2013.

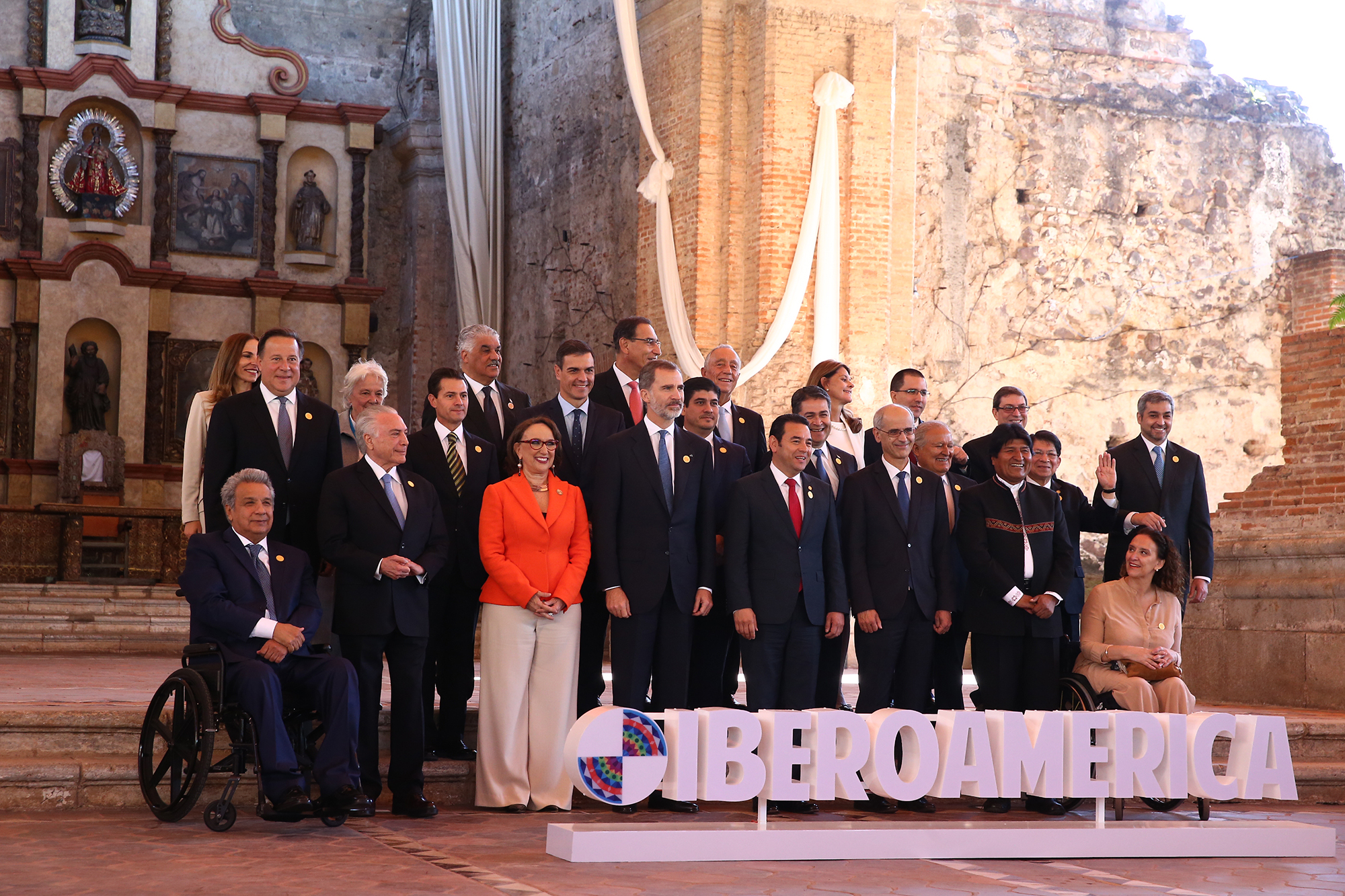
President Jimmy Morales along with King Felipe VI and Prime Minister Pedro Sánchez (among other leaders) in Antigua Guatemala; November 2018.

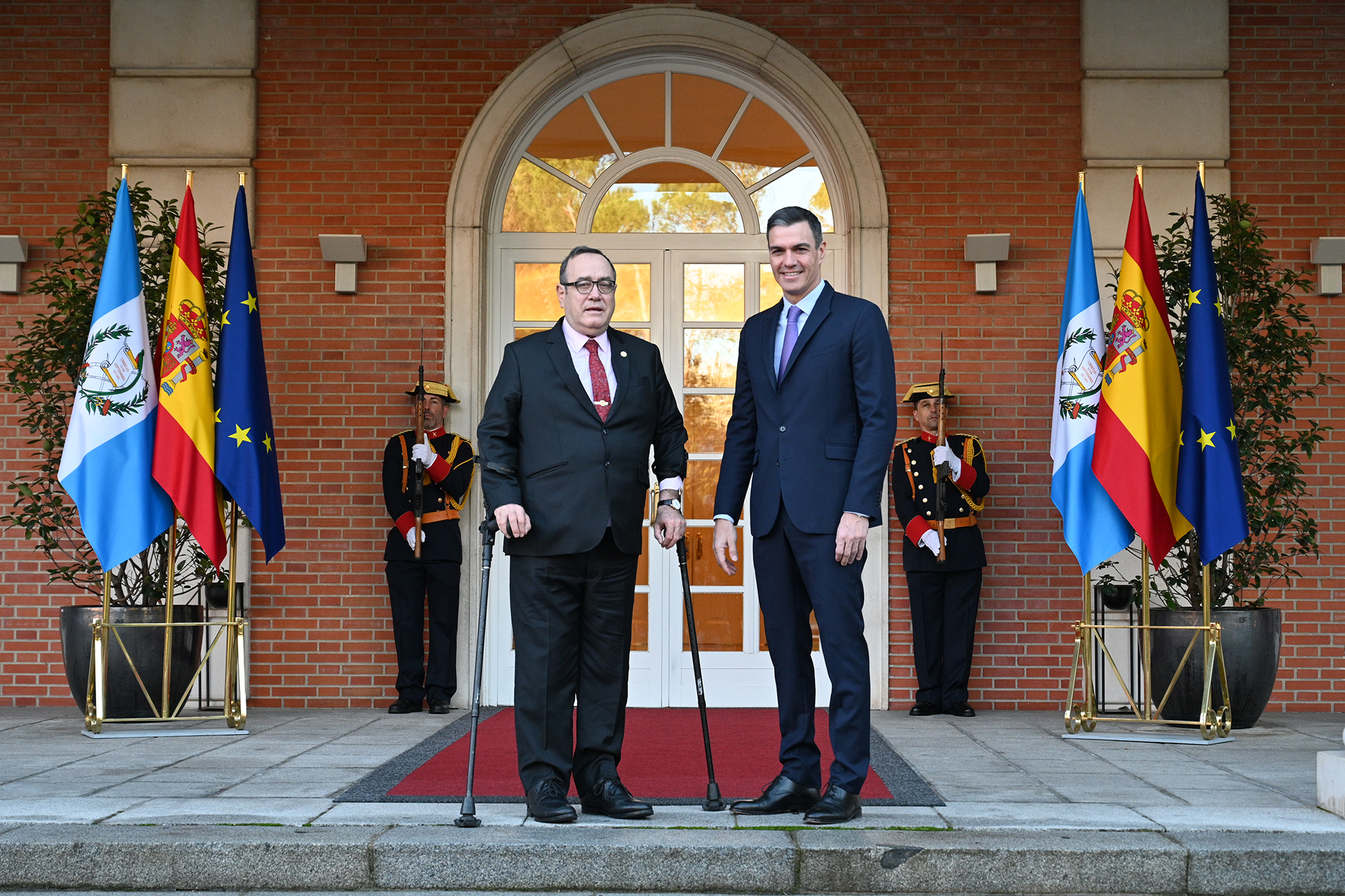
Prime Minister Pedro Sánchez and President Alejandro Giammattei in Madrid; January 2023.

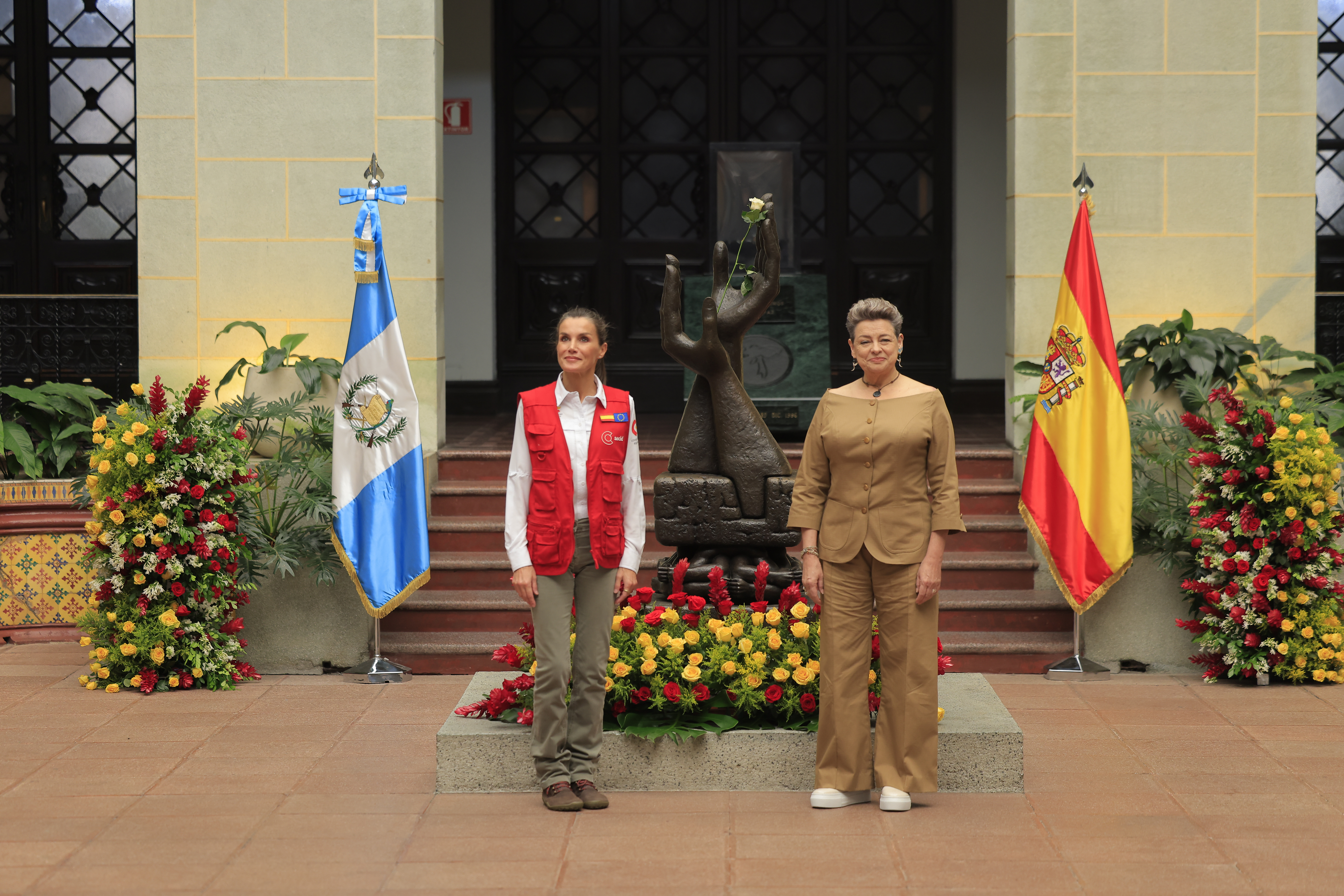
First Lady Lucrecia Peinado and Queen Letizia in Guatemala City; June 2024.

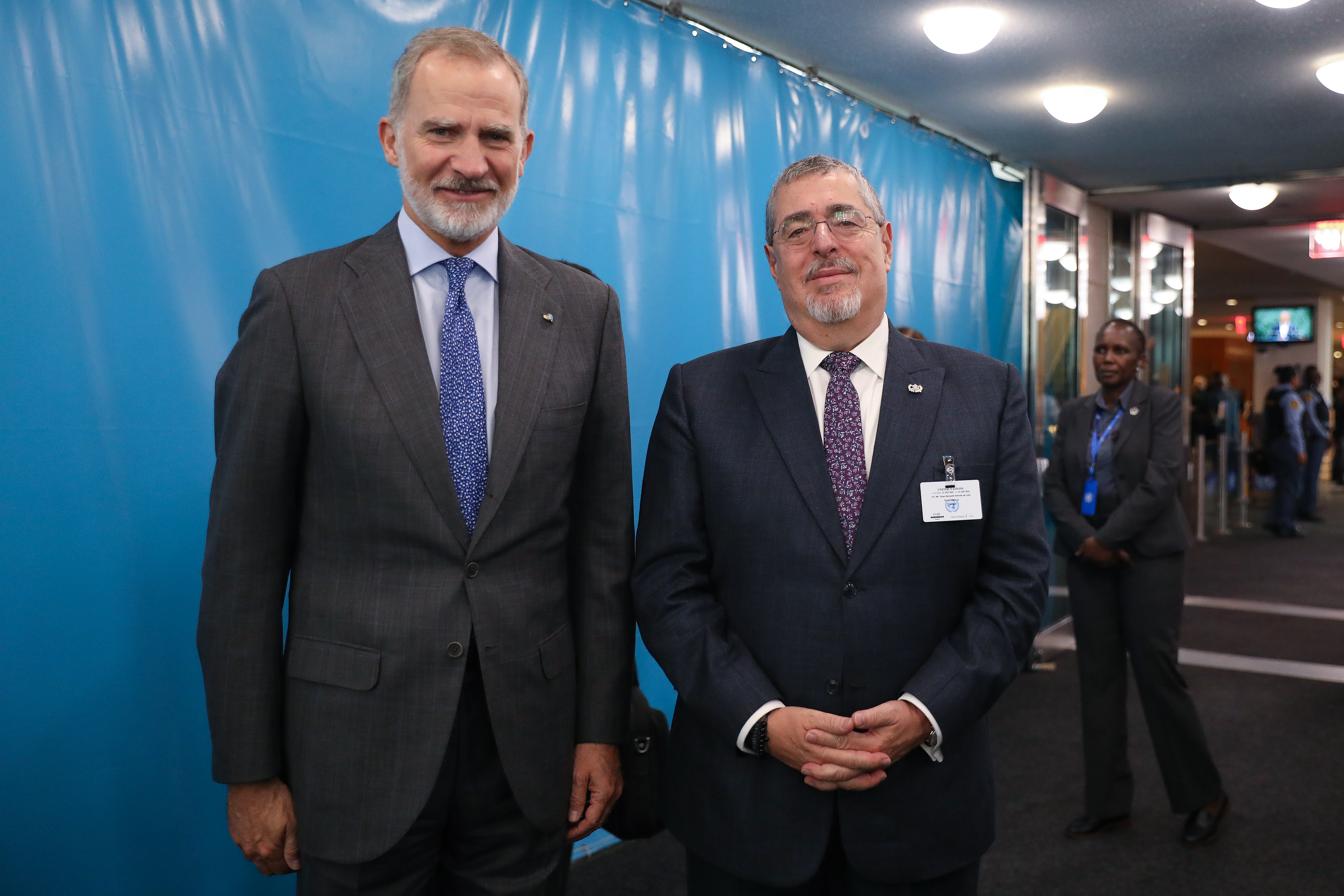
King Felipe VI and President Bernardo Arévalo in New York City; September 2025.

== Bilateral relations ==
Guatemala and Spain have signed numerous bilateral agreements and treaties, such as an Extradition Treaty (1895); Agreement on the Protection of Industries and Trade (1925); Agreement on Dual-Nationality (1961); Cultural Agreement (1964); Agreement on the elimination of Tourist Visas (1968); Air Transportation Agreement (1971); Agreement on Technical Cooperation (1977); Agreement on Educational, Cultural and Sports Cooperation (1989) and an Agreement on the Protection of Investments (1999).

== Cultural cooperation ==
Guatemala hosts a Spanish Cultural Center in Guatemala City and a Spanish Cooperation Training Center in Antigua Guatemala. Likewise, both countries have carried out cultural exchanges with exhibitions on Guatemalan and Spanish culture in their respective museums and galleries, promoting tourism between both societies. Twinning agreements have also been processed between several of their respective cities.

== Transportation ==
There are direct flights between Guatemala and Spain with Iberia airlines.

== Trade ==
In 2025, trade between Guatemala and Spain totaled €544 million Euros. Guatemala's main exports to Spain include: tuna, shrimp, zinc, sugar, rum and coffee. Spain's main exports to Guatemala include: machinery, medicine, food products, electrical equipment and steel. Spain is Guatemala's fifth largest foreign investor (after the United States, Canada, Mexico and Colombia). In 2018, Spanish investments in Guatemala totaled US$31 million. Spanish multinational companies such as Mapfre, Telefónica and Zara operate in Guatemala.

== Resident diplomatic missions ==
of Guatemala in Spain

- Madrid (Embassy)

of Spain in Guatemala

- Guatemala City (Embassy)

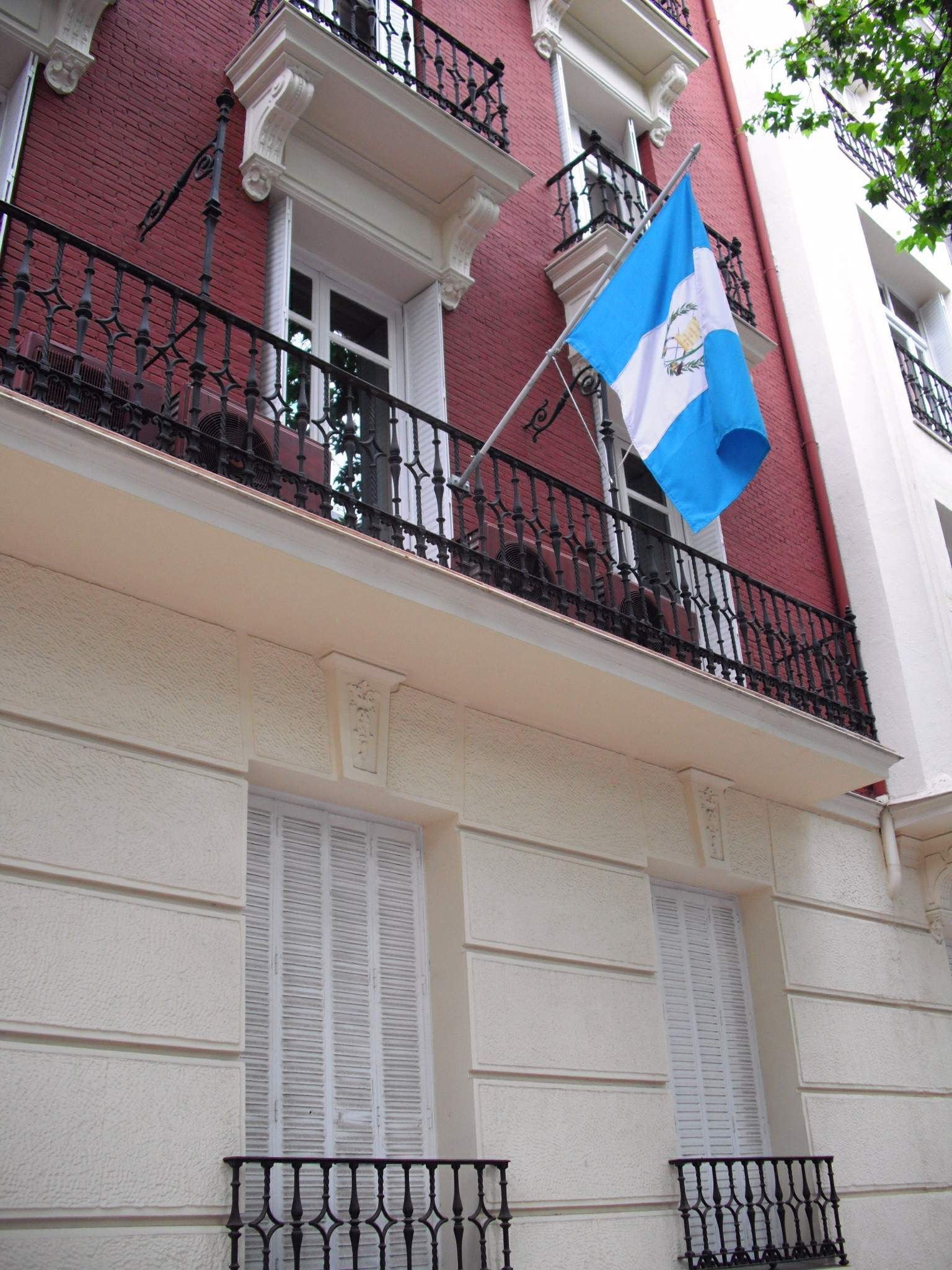
Embassy of Guatemala in Madrid

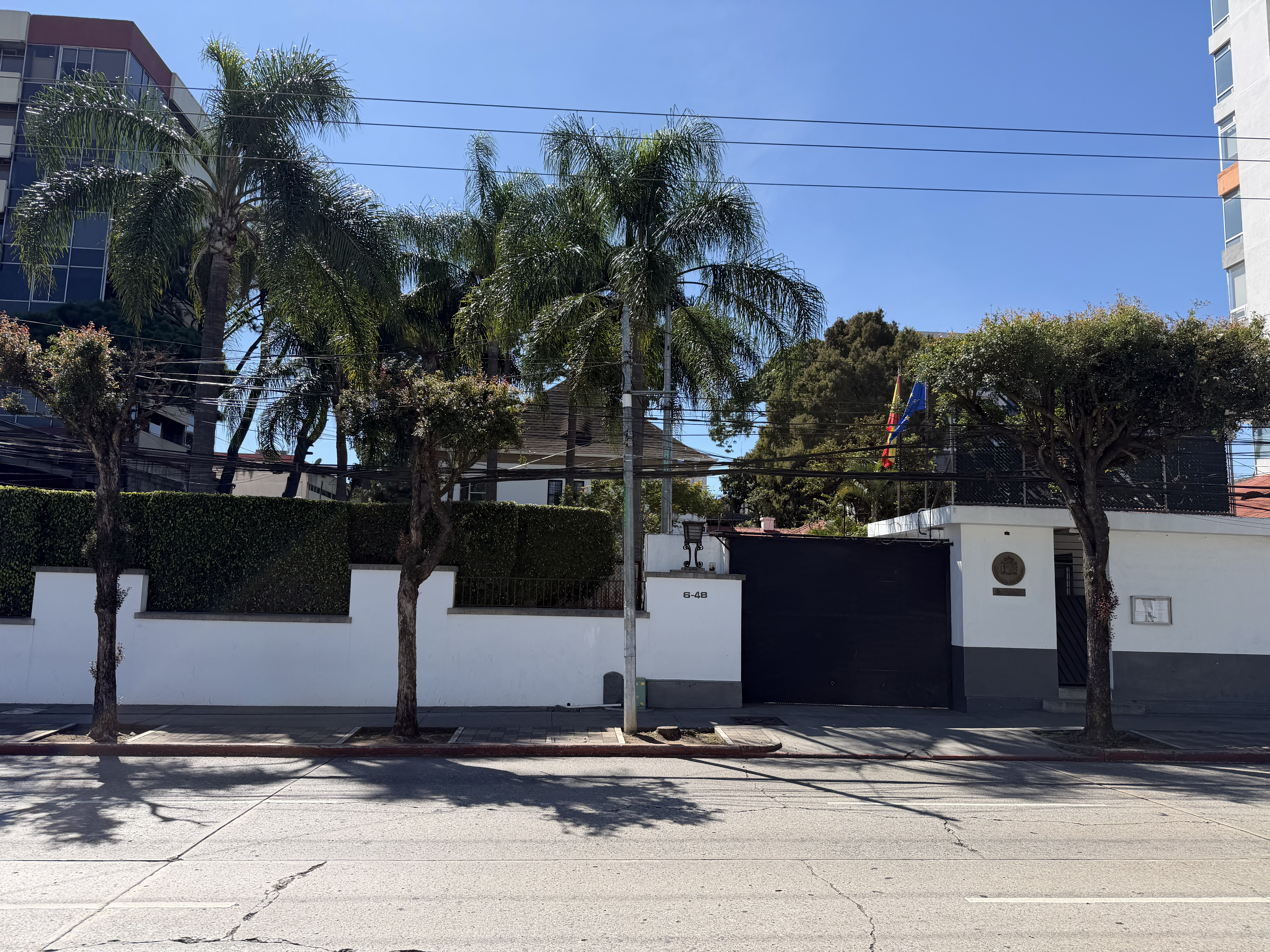
Embassy of Spain in Guatemala City

== See also ==
- Burning of the Spanish Embassy
- Immigration to Spain
- Spanish immigration to Guatemala
- List of ambassadors of Spain to Guatemala
