= Rigoberta Menchú =

K'iche' Guatemalan human rights activist (born 1959)

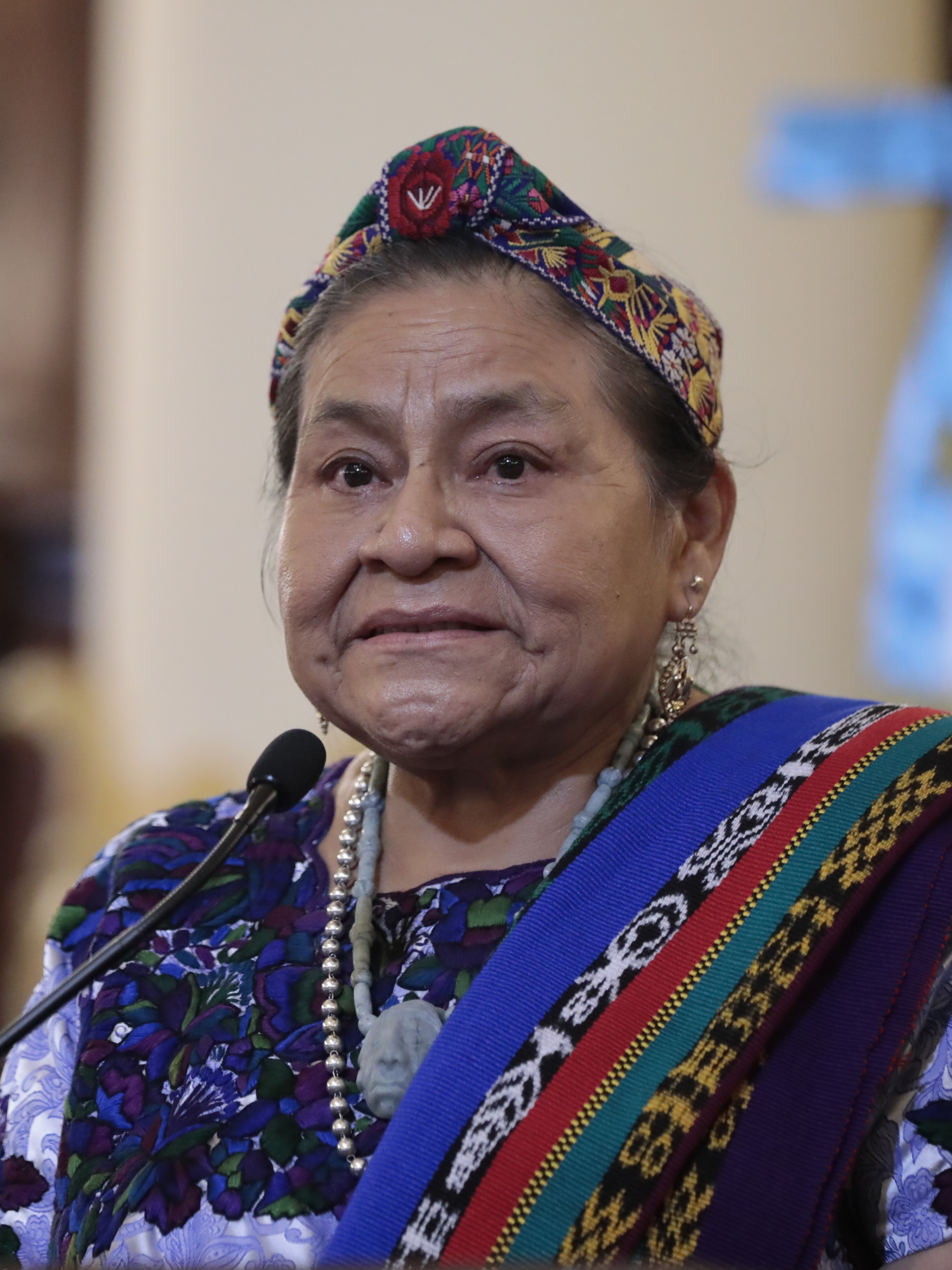
- Menchú in 2024
- Born: Rigoberta Menchú Tum; 9 January 1959 (age 67); Laj Chimel, Quiché, Guatemala
- Citizenship: Guatemala; Mexico
- Occupations: Activist, politician
- Political party: Winaq (founder)
- Spouse: Ángel Cortez (m. 1995)
- Children: 2 (1 deceased)
- Parents: Vicente Menchú Pérez-Mia (father); Juana Tum Kótoja-Mia (mother)
- Awards: Nobel Peace Prize in 1992; Prince of Asturias Awards in 1998; Order of the Aztec Eagle in 2010

Rigoberta Menchú Tum (Spanish: [riɣoˈβeɾta menˈtʃu]; born 9 January 1959) is a K'iche' Guatemalan human rights activist, feminist, and Nobel Peace Prize laureate. Menchú has dedicated her life to publicizing the rights of Guatemala's Indigenous peoples during and after the Guatemalan Civil War (1960–1996), and to promoting Indigenous rights internationally.

She received the Nobel Peace Prize in 1992, was named a UNESCO Goodwill Ambassador in 1996, and received the Prince of Asturias Award in 1998. She is the subject of the testimonial biography I, Rigoberta Menchú (1983), and author of the autobiographical work Crossing Borders (1998). Menchú founded the country's first indigenous political party, Winaq, and ran as its candidate for president of Guatemala in the 2007 and 2011 presidential elections.

== Personal life ==
Rigoberta Menchú was born to a poor Indigenous family of K'iche' Maya descent in Laj Chimel, a rural area in the north-central Guatemalan department of El Quiché. Her family was one of many Indigenous families who could not sustain themselves on the small pieces of land they were left with after the Spanish conquest of Guatemala. Menchú's mother began her career as a midwife at age sixteen and continued to practice using traditional medicinal plants until she was murdered at age 43. Her father was a prominent activist for the rights of Indigenous farmers in Guatemala. Both of her parents regularly attended Catholic church, but her mother remained connected to her Maya spirituality and identity. She believes in many teachings of the Catholic Church, but her mother's Maya influence also taught Menchú the importance of living in harmony with nature and retaining her Maya culture. Menchú considers herself to be the perfect mix of both her parents.

In 1979–80, Menchú's brother, Patrocinio, and mother, Juana Tum Kótoja, were kidnapped, brutally tortured and murdered by the Guatemalan Army. Her father, Vicente Menchú Perez, died in the 1980 Burning of the Spanish Embassy, which occurred after urban guerrillas took hostages and were attacked by government security forces. In January 2015, Pedro García Arredondo, a former police commander of the Guatemalan Army who later served as the chief of the now defunct National Police (Policía Nacional, PN), was convicted of attempted murder and crimes against humanity for his role in the embassy attack; Arrendondo was also previously convicted in 2012 of ordering the enforced disappearance of agronomy student Édgar Enrique Sáenz Calito during the country's long-running internal armed conflict.

In 1984, Menchú's other brother, Victor, was shot to death after he surrendered to the Guatemalan Army, was threatened by soldiers, and tried to escape.

In 1995, Menchú married Ángel Canil, a Guatemalan, in a Mayan ceremony. They had a Catholic wedding in January 1998; at that time they also buried their son Tz'unun ("hummingbird" in K’iche’ Maya), who had died after being born prematurely in December. They adopted a son, Mash Nahual Ja' ("Spirit of Water").

Menchú featured prominently in the 1983 documentary When the Mountains Tremble, directed by Newton Thomas Sigel and Pamela Yates.

She lives with her family in the municipality of San Pedro Jocopilas, Quiché Department, northwest of Guatemala City, in the heartland of the Kʼicheʼ people.

In 2025, Menchú became a Mexican citizen.

== Connections to the Guatemalan civil war ==
Following military coups that started with the CIA-orchestrated removal of President Jacobo Arbenz in Guatemala in 1954, the Cuban revolution of 1959, and the Che Guevara's commitment to create as many Vietnams as he could, the U.S. moved to condone and often support authoritarian rule in the name of national security. The Guatemalan Civil War lasted from 1962 to 1996 and was provoked by social, economic, and political inequality. An estimated 250,000 people were assassinated, including 50,000 desaparecidos, and hundreds of thousands of displaced individuals, either at the hands of the armed forces or the militarized civilians knows as Patrullas de Autodefensa Civil (Civil Defense Patrols). This made people nervous since arming civilians, let alone Indigenous peoples, was not a very common occurrence in Guatemala and was, in fact, illegal according to the country's constitution.

Massacres of Indigenous men, women, and children in Guatemala began in May 1978, culminating in 1982. By 1981 the US Central Intelligence Agency (CIA) was reporting on the indiscriminate killing of civilians in rural areas, government soldiers being "forced to fire at anything that moved". In 1982 the CIA reported several villages being burned to the ground while Guatemalan commanding officers were "expected to give no quarter to combats and non-combats alike".

These inequalities were most impactful on marginalized populations, especially indigenous communities. To maintain order, the state implemented forceful measures that often, violated human rights. This ultimately led to mass genocide, disappearances, and displacement of indigenous populations. 83% of victims were later identified as Mayan, indicating that a majority of human rights violated were those of the Indigenous communities of Guatemala. These events had a deep impact on Menchú and her family and were the root cause of her activism in Indigenous rights.

== Guatemalan activism ==
From a young age, Menchú was active alongside her father. Together they advocated for the rights of Indigenous farmers through the Committee for Peasant Unity. Menchú often faced discrimination for wanting to join her male family members in the fight for justice, but she was inspired by her mother to continue making space for herself. Menchú believes that the roots of Indigenous oppression in Guatemala stem from issues of exploitation and colonial land ownership, and in her early activism focused on defending her people from colonial exploitation.

After leaving school, Menchú worked as an activist campaigning against human rights violations committed by the Guatemalan Army during the country's civil war, which lasted from 1960 to 1996. Many of the human rights violations that occurred during the war targeted Indigenous peoples. Women were targets of physical and sexual violence at the hands of the military.

In 1981, Menchú was exiled and escaped to Mexico where she found refuge in the home of a Catholic bishop in Chiapas. Menchú continued to organize resistance to oppression in Guatemala and organize the struggle for Indigenous rights by co-founding the United Republic of Guatemalan Opposition. Tens of thousands of people, mostly indigenous Maya people, fled to Mexico from 1982 to 1984 at the height of Guatemala's 36-year civil war.

A year later, in 1982, she told her life story to Venezuelan author and anthropologist Elizabeth Burgos. Leading to the book titled Me llamo Rigoberta Menchú y así me nació la conciencia (My Name is Rigoberta Menchú, and this is how my Awareness was Born). The book was translated into five other languages including English and French. Menchú's work made her an international icon at the time of the ongoing conflict in Guatemala and brought attention to the suffering of Indigenous peoples under an oppressive government regime.

Menchú served as the Presidential Goodwill Ambassador for the 1996 Peace Accords in Guatemala. That same year she received the Peace Abbey Courage of Conscience Award in Boston.

After the Guatemalan Civil War ended, Menchú campaigned to have Guatemalan political and military establishment members tried in Spanish courts. In 1999, she filed a complaint before a court in Spain because prosecutions of civil-war era crimes in Guatemala was practically impossible. These attempts stalled as the Spanish courts determined that the plaintiffs had not yet exhausted all possibilities of seeking justice through the legal system of Guatemala. On 23 December 2006, Spain called for the extradition from Guatemala of seven former members of Guatemala's government, including Efraín Ríos Montt and Óscar Mejía, on charges of genocide and torture. Spain's highest court ruled that cases of genocide committed abroad could be judged in Spain, even if no Spanish citizens were involved. In addition to the deaths of Spanish citizens, the most serious charges include genocide against the Maya people of Guatemala.

=== Politics ===
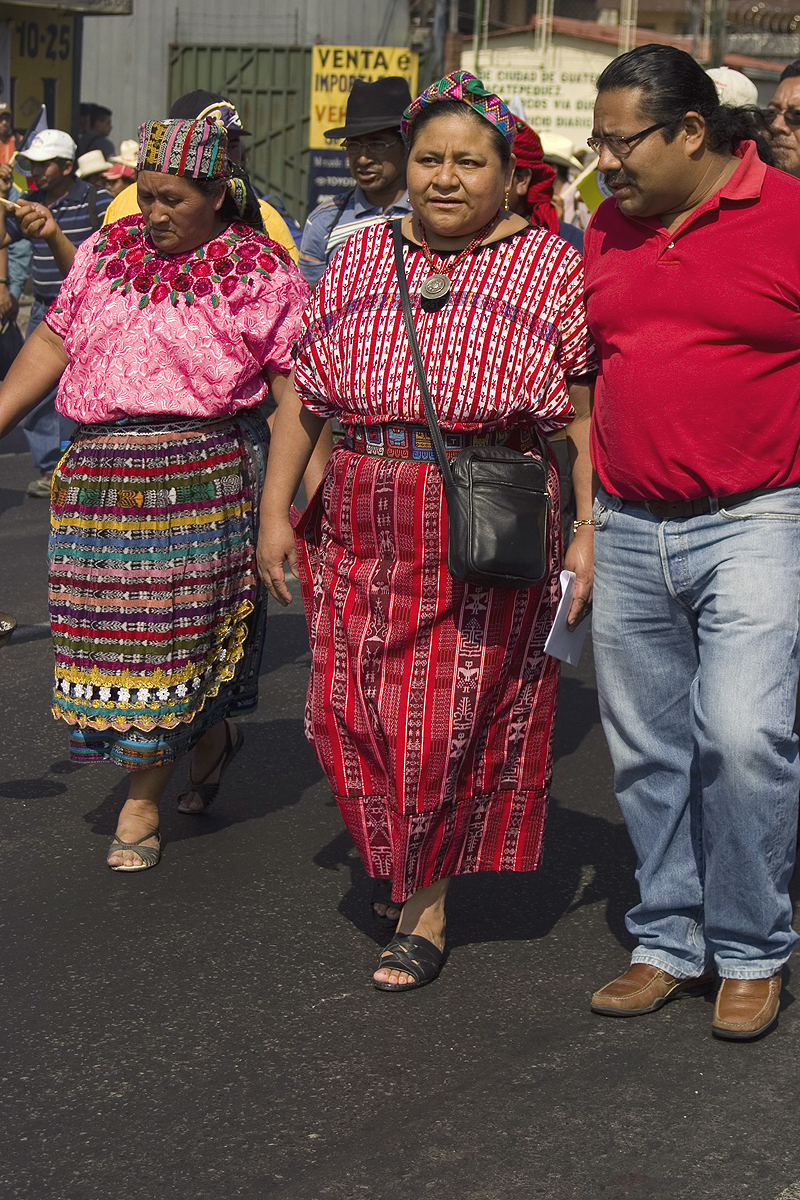
Menchú commemorating the Treaty on Identity and Rights of Indigenous Peoples, 2009

In 2005, Menchú joined the Guatemalan federal government as goodwill ambassador for the National Peace Accords. Menchú faced opposition and discrimination. In April 2005, five Guatemalan politicians would be convicted for hurling racial epithets at Menchú. Court rulings would also uphold the right to wear indigenous dresses and practice Mayan spirituality.

On 12 February 2007, Menchú announced that she would form an Indigenous political party called Encuentro por Guatemala and that she would stand in the 2007 presidential election. She was the first Maya, Indigenous woman to ever run in a Guatemalan election. In the 2007 election, Menchú was defeated in the first round, receiving three percent of the vote.

In 2009, Menchú became involved in the newly founded party Winaq. Menchú was a candidate for the 2011 presidential election, but lost in the first round, winning three percent of the vote again. Although Menchú was not elected, Winaq succeeded in becoming the first Indigenous political party of Guatemala.

== International activism ==
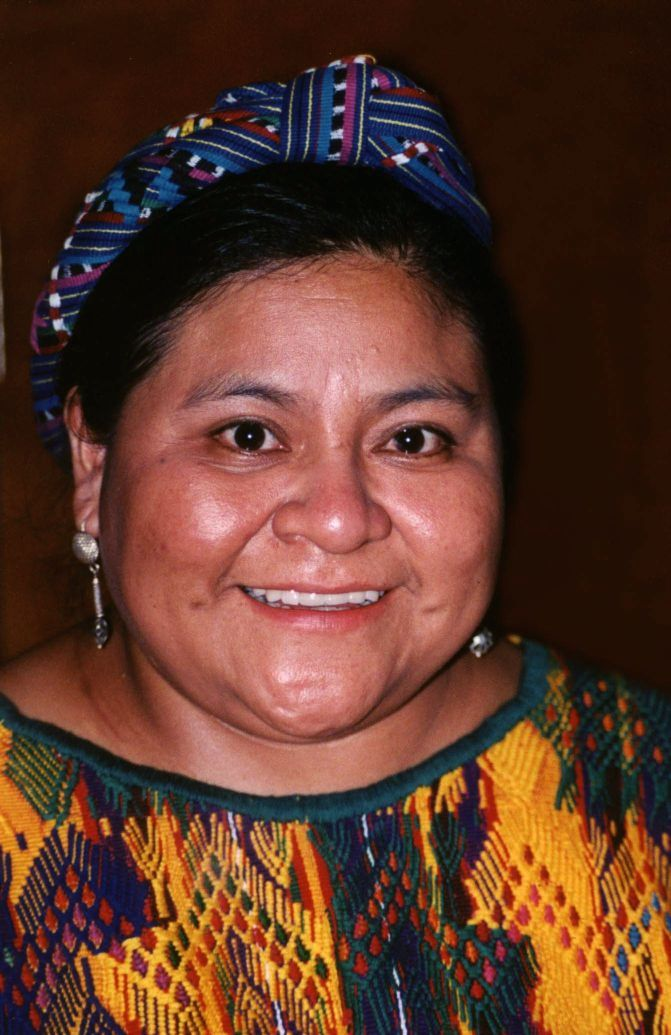
Menchú in 1998

At the peak of state counterinsurgency, the Permanent Peoples’ Tribunal: Session on Guatemala (PPT-SG), held in Madrid in 1983, was the first of its kind for Central America. The tribunal looked at evidence going back to the CIA-backed coup that ousted democratically elected president Jacobo Árbenz in 1954; although its focus was on the massacres, scorched earth policies, forced disappearances, torture, and killings taking place at the time under General Efraín Ríos Montt. Menchú was included in the five-day tribunal, that included twenty-two testifiers, and shared how her mother was used as bait as an effort to trap her children:

According to the testimony of a cousin, who [also] tortured my mother and even looked after her corpse for four months on the mountainside, my mother was tortured for about twelve days. They changed her Maya dress for a military uniform, they cut her hair, and for twelve days she was cruelly tortured . . . [doctors were brought to resuscitate her], and they began again with the same tortures, they started raping her again. . . . Little by little my mother lost her will to live. When she was again about to die, they took her to a ravine about fifteen minutes away from Uspantán, they dumped her, still alive, among the vegetation. The military guarded her permanently for four months. My mother died slowly, she was eaten by animals, by buzzards, until only the largest bones of her body remained. The military let no one draw near. (TPP 1984, 43)

— Rigoberta Menchú, Five-day tribunal, Speed, Shannon, and Lynn Stephen, eds. Indigenous Women and Violence : Feminist Activist Research in Heightened States of Injustice / Edited by Lynn Stephen and Shannon Speed. 1st ed. Tucson, Arizona: University of Arizona Press, 2021.

Almost thirty years later, the First Tribunal of Consciousness Against Sexual Violence Toward Women took place in Guatemala City in 2010. The 1983 PPT-SG did not acknowledge the rape of women, particularly Maya women, during the armed conflict testifiers spoke; but it would take another twenty-seven years for sexual violence to be fully recognized in an ethical tribunal, and thirty-three years for it to be legally condemned in 2016 in the Sepur Zarco case. The trial and conviction of Jose Efrain Rios Montt in Guatemala in 2013 demonstrates that 15 years later, it is possible to convict a former head of state of crimes against humanity. Guatemala became the first Latin America country to place a former president on trial for genocide, being charged for the killing and disappearance of 70,000 people and the displacement of hundreds of thousands.

In 1996, Menchú was appointed as a UNESCO Goodwill Ambassador in recognition of her activism for the rights of Indigenous people. In this capacity, she acted as a spokesperson for the first International Decade of the World's Indigenous Peoples (1995–2004), where she worked to improve international collaboration on issues such as environment, education, health care, and human rights for Indigenous peoples. In 2015, Menchú met with the general director of UNESCO, Irina Bokova, in order to solidify relations between Guatemala and the organization.

Since 2003, Menchú has become involved in the Indigenous pharmaceutical industry as president of "Salud para Todos" ("Health for All") and the company "Farmacias Similares," with the goal of offering low-cost generic medicines. As president of this organization, Menchú has received pushback from large pharmaceutical companies due to her desire to shorten the patent life of certain AIDS and cancer drugs to increase their availability and affordability.

In 2006, Menchú was one of the founders of the Nobel Women's Initiative along with sister Nobel Peace Laureates Jody Williams, Shirin Ebadi, Wangari Maathai, Betty Williams and Mairead Corrigan Maguire. These six women, representing North America, South America, Europe, the Middle East, and Africa, decided to bring together their experiences in a united effort for peace, justice and equality. It is the goal of the Nobel Women's Initiative to help strengthen women's rights around the world.

Menchú is a member of PeaceJam, an organization whose mission is to use Nobel Peace Laureates as mentors and models for young people and provide a way for these Laureates to share their knowledge, passions, and experience. She travels around the world speaking to youth through PeaceJam conferences. She has also been a member of the Foundation Chirac's honor committee since the foundation was launched in 2008 by former French president Jacques Chirac in order to promote world peace.

Menchú has continued her activism by continuing to raise awareness for issues including political and economic inequality and climate change.

On 21 September 2002, together with Rita Levi-Montalcini, she took part in a meeting at Villa del Vascello, Rome, Italy, in the headquarters of the Masonic organization Grand Orient of Italy, to discuss science and peace in the service of mankind.

== Legacy ==
=== Awards and honors ===
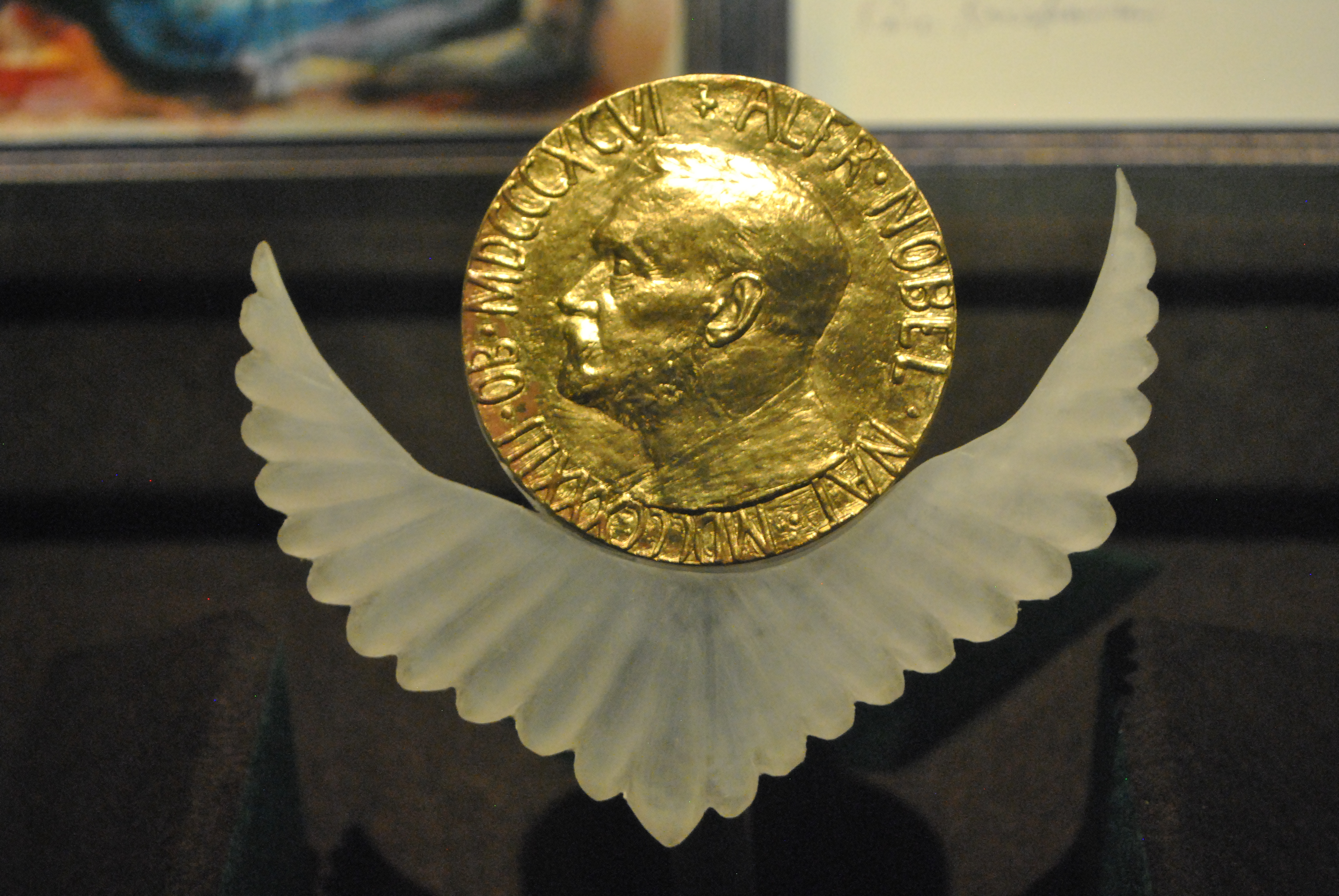
The Nobel Peace Prize Medal awarded to Menchú is safeguarded in the Museo del Templo Mayor in Mexico City.

- 1992 Nobel Peace Prize for her advocacy and social justice work for the indigenous peoples of Latin America
- 1992 UNESCO Goodwill Ambassador position for her advocacy for the indigenous peoples of Guatemala
  - Menchú was the youngest recipient of the Nobel Peace Prize at the time, and the first indigenous people recipient.
- 1996 Peace Abbey Courage of Conscience Award for her authorship and advocacy for the indigenous peoples of Guatemala
- 1998 Prince of Asturias Prize for improving the condition of women and the communities they serve. (Jointly with 6 other women.)
- 1999 asteroid 9481 Menchú was named in her honor (M.P.C. 34354)
- 2010 Order of the Aztec Eagle for services provided for Mexico
- 2018 Spendlove Prize for her advocacy for minority groups
- In 2022, the University of Bordeaux Montaigne, located in Pessac, gave her name to its newly built library in her honor.

=== Publications ===
- I, Rigoberta Menchú (1983)
  - This book, also titled My Name is Rigoberta Menchú and that's how my Conscience was Born, was dictated by Menchú and transcribed by Elizabeth Burgos
- Crossing Borders (1998)
- Enkelin der Maya [Daughter of the Maya] (1999)
- The Girl from Chimel (2005) with Dante Liano, illustrated by Domi
- The Honey Jar (2006) with Dante Liano, illustrated by Domi
- The Secret Legacy (2008) with Dante Liano, illustrated by Domi
- K'aslemalil-Vivir. El caminar de Rigoberta Menchú Tum en el Tiempo (2012)

== Testimony controversy ==
More than a decade after the publication of I, Rigoberta Menchú, anthropologist David Stoll investigated Menchú's story and claimed that Menchú changed some elements about her life, family, and village to meet the publicity needs of the guerrilla movement. Stoll acknowledged the violence against the Maya civilians in his book, Rigoberta Menchu and the Story of all Poor Guatemalans, but believed the guerillas were responsible for the army's atrocities. The controversy caused by Stoll's book received widespread coverage in the US press of the time; thus the New York Times highlighted a few claims in her book contradicted by other sources:

A younger brother whom Ms. Menchu says she saw die of starvation never existed, while a second, whose suffering she says she and her parents were forced to watch as he was being burned alive by army troops, was killed in entirely different circumstances when the family was not present. Contrary to Ms. Menchu's assertion in the first page of her book that I never went to school and could not speak Spanish or read or write until shortly before she dictated the text of I, Rigoberta Menchu, she in fact received the equivalent of a middle-school education as a scholarship student at two prestigious private boarding schools operated by Roman Catholic nuns.

Many authors have defended Menchú, and attributed the controversy to different interpretations of the testimonio genre. Menchú herself states, "I'd like to stress that it's not only my life, it's also the testimony of my people." An error in Rigoberta Menchu and the Story of all Poor Guatemalans is Stoll's representation of the massacre at the Spanish embassy in Guatemala in 1980 as a self-immolation coordinated by student and indigenous leaders of the peasant protesters occupying the embassy; investigators in 1981 reported on the massacre and the La Comisión para el Esclarecimiento Histórico (Commission for the Historical Clarification-CEH) and published findings concluding that the army carried out a premeditated firebombing of the embassy.

Later, a declassified CIA document from late February 1982 states that in mid-February 1982 the Guatemalan army reinforced its existing forces and launched a "sweep operation in the Ixil Triangle; and commanding officers of the units involved had been instructed to destroy all towns and villages which were cooperating in the Guerilla Army of the Poor (EGP) and eliminate all sources of resistance." This was a fallacy recently repeated in the Times Literary Supplement by Ilan Stavans in his review of Stoll's book. Some scholars have stated that, despite its factual and historical inaccuracies, Menchú's testimony remains relevant for the ways in which it depicts the life of an Indigenous Guatemalan during the civil war.

The Nobel Committee dismissed calls to revoke Menchú's Nobel Prize, in spite of Stoll's allegations regarding Menchú. Geir Lundestad, the secretary of the committee, stated that Menchú's prize was awarded because of her advocacy and social justice work, not because of her testimony, and that she had committed no observable wrongdoing.

According to Mark Horowitz, William Yaworsky, and Kenneth Kickham, the controversy about Stoll's account of Menchu is one of the three most divisive episodes in recent American anthropological history, along with controversies about the truthfulness of Margaret Mead's Coming of Age in Samoa and Napoleon Chagnon's representation of violence among the Yanomami.

== See also ==
- List of civil rights leaders
- List of peace activists
- List of female Nobel laureates
- List of feminists

== Bibliography ==
- Ament, Gail. "Recent Maya Incursions into Guatemalan Literary Historiography". Literary Cultures of Latin America: A Comparative History. Eds. Mario J. Valdés & Djelal Kadir. 3 Vols. Vol 1: Configurations of Literary Culture. Oxford: Oxford University Press, 2004: I: 216–215.
- Arias, Arturo. "After the Rigoberta Menchú Controversy: Lessons Learned About the Nature of Subalternity and the Specifics of the Indigenous Subject" MLN 117.2 (2002): 481–505.
- Beverley, John. "The Real Thing (Our Rigoberta)" Modern Language Quarterly 57:2 (June 1996): 129–235.
- Brittin, Alice A. "Close Encounters of the Third World Kind: Rigoberta Menchu and Elisabeth Burgos's Me llamo Rigoberta Menchu". Latin American Perspectives, Vol. 22, No. 4, Redefining Democracy: Cuba and Chiapas (Autumn, 1995), pp. 100–114.
- De Valdés, María Elena. "The Discourse of the Other: Testimonio and the Fiction of the Maya." Bulletin of Hispanic Studies (Liverpool), LXXIII (1996): 79–90.
- Feal, Rosemary Geisdorfer. "Women Writers into the Mainstream: Contemporary Latin American Narrative". Philosophy and Literature in Latin America. Eds. Jorge J.E. Gracia and Mireya Camurati. New York: State University of New York, 1989. An overview of women in contemporary Latin American letters.
- Golden, Tim. "Guatemalan Indian Wins the Nobel Peace Prize": New York Times (17 October 1992): p. A1, A5.
- Golden, Tim. "Guatemalan to Fight on With Nobel as Trumpet": New York Times (19 October 1992): p. A5.
- Gossen, Gary H. "Rigoberta Menchu and Her Epic Narrative". Latin American Perspectives, Vol. 26, No. 6, If Truth Be Told: A Forum on David Stoll's "Rigoberta Menchu and the Story of All Poor Guatemalans" (Nov., 1999), pp. 64–69.
- Gray Díaz, Nancy. "Indian Women Writers of Spanish America". Spanish American Women Writers: A Bio-Bibliographical Source Book. Ed. Diane E. Marting. New York: Greenwood Press, 1988
- Millay, Amy Nauss. Voices from the Fuente Viva: The Effect of Orality in Twentieth-Century Spanish American Narrative. Lewisburg: Bucknell University Press, 2005.
- Logan, Kathleen. "Personal Testimony: Latin American Women Telling Their Lives". Latin American Research Review 32.1 (1997): 199–211. Review Essay.
- Nelan, Bruce W. "Striking Against Racism". Time 140:61 (26 October 1992): p. 61.
- Stanford, Victoria. "Between Rigoberta Menchu and La Violencia: Deconstructing David Stoll's History of Guatemala" Latin American Perspectives 26.6, If Truth Be Told: A Forum on David Stoll's "Rigoberta Menchu and the Story of All Poor Guatemalans" (Nov., 1999), pp. 38–46.
- ---. "From I, Rigoberta to the Commissioning of Truth Maya Women and the Reshaping of Guatemalan History". Cultural Critique 47 (2001) 16–53.
- Sommer, Doris. "Rigoberta's Secrets" Latin American Perspectives, Vol. 18, No. 3, Voices of the Voiceless in Testimonial Literature, Part I. (Summer, 1991), pp. 32–50.
- Stoll, David "Rigoberta Menchu and the Story of All Poor Guatemalans" (Westview Press, 1999)
- ---. "Slaps and Embraces: A Rhetoric of Particularism". The Latin American Subaltern Studies Reader. Ed. Iliana Rodríguez. Durham: Duke University Press, 2001.
- Wise, R. Todd. "Native American Testimonio: The Shared Vision of Black Elk and Rigoberta Menchú". In Christianity and Literature, Volume 45, Issue No.1 (Autumn 1995).
- Zimmerman, Marc. "Rigoberta Menchú After the Nobel: From Militant Narrative to Postmodern Politics". The Latin American Subaltern Studies Reader. Durham: Duke University Press, 2001.
