= Irma Alicia Velásquez Nimatuj =

Kʼicheʼ Mayan Guatemalan journalist and anthropologist (born 1965)

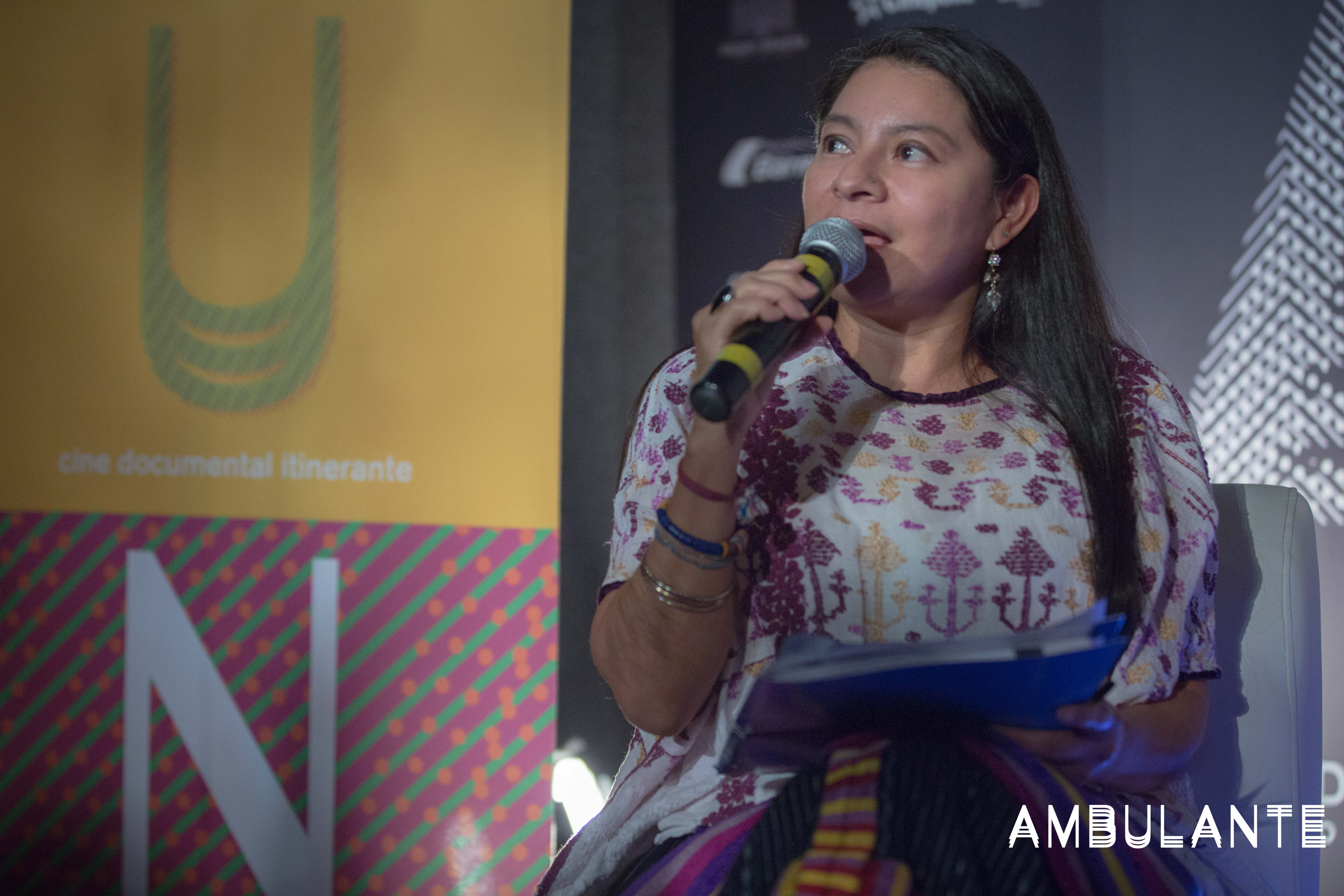
- Irma Alicia Velásquez Nimatuj in 2019
- Born: 1965 (age 60–61); Quetzaltenango, Guatemala
- Education: Universidad de San Carlos de Guatemala; University of Texas

Irma Alicia Velásquez Nimatuj (born 1965) is a K'iche' Mayan Guatemalan journalist and anthropologist. She is a leading author in the study of structural racism.

== Early life and education ==
Velásquez Nimatuj was born in Quetzaltenango, Guatemala, in 1965. Her childhood was marked by Guatemalan civil war and discrimination against indigenous people.

She graduated as a teacher from the Instituto Normal para Señoritas de Ocidente in her hometown. She then moved to Guatemala City, where earned a degree in Communication Sciences from the Universidad de San Carlos de Guatemala. In 1997, Velásquez Nimatuj became the first indigenous woman to receive a Fulbright scholarship, and she studied social anthropology in the United States, where she earned her doctorate from the University of Texas in 2005.

== Career ==
On 14 June 2002, she filed a complaint against a company after being denied entry to a Cervecería Centro Americana tavern in Guatemala City for wearing regional clothing. It became the first complaint of racial discrimination in the country, especially after the 1996 peace agreements. The following day, Ana Cofiño published an opinion column in the El Periódico calling for a boycott of the company. This column contributed greatly to the media coverage of the altercation, to such an extent that members of the government and the president of Congress himself spoke out against racial discrimination. The Minister of Culture and Sports Otilia Lux stated that a constitutional reform recognising Guatemala as a multicultural society and the enactment of laws against racism would be necessary and a call for citizens to change their attitudes towards discrimination. The complaint was dismissed in September as racial discrimination was not classified as a crime. Years later, this led to racial discrimination being classified as a crime.

As a journalist, she worked for Prensa Libre, El Industrial, El Periódico, and El Quetzalteco. Between 2005 and 2013, she was executive director of the Oxlajuj Tz’ikin Indigenous Peoples Mechanism.

In 2010, she gave her testimony at the Tribunal of Conscience against Sexual Violence against Women during the Armed Conflict. During the trial against Ríos Montt, she wrote several articles for which she received death threats and attended the hearings. She was in charge of the expert report in the Sepur Zarco case, recounting the slavery and sexual violence suffered by Mayan women between 1960 and 1996 during the armed conflict.

Between 2014 and 2015, she was gender and indigenous peoples advisor for the UN Women office in Latin America and the Caribbean. Nimatuj has participated in documentaries about the resistance of the Maya people. Nimatuj has lectured at Brown University, Stanford University and Duke University.

She was part of the initial group that began working in 2003 and ended up founding the Movimiento Semilla, although she did not sign the party's charter. In 2025, she criticised President Bernardo Arévalo's lack of leadership and organic work for the party.

== Books ==
- La justicia nunca estuvo de nuestro lado. Peritaje cultural sobre conflicto armado y violencia sexual en el caso de Sepur Zarco, Guatemala (Instituto Hegoa, 2019)
- Lunas y Calendarios, colección poesía guatemalteca (Editorial Cultura, 2018)
- Pueblos indígenas, estado y lucha por tierra en Guatemala: Estrategias de sobrevivencia y negociación ante la desigualdad globalizada (AVANCSO, 2008)
- La pequeña burguesía indígena comercial de Guatemala: Desigualdades de clase, raza y género (SERJUS Y AVANCSO, 2002)
