= 1980 Spanish embassy burning in Guatemala City =

Guatemalan attack on the Spanish Embassy in Guatemala City, Guatemala

Burning of the Spanish Embassy
- Part of Guatemalan Civil War
- Location: Guatemala City, Guatemala.
- Date: 31 January 1980; 46 years ago
- Target: Committee for Peasant Unity Members of the Embassy of Spain in Guatemala
- Attack type: State terrorism
- Deaths: 37 hostage (8 Spanish diplomats + 28 peasants and activists)
- Perpetrators: Guatemalan Police; Armed Forces of Guatemala

The Burning of the Spanish Embassy (sometimes called the Spanish Embassy Massacre or the Spanish Embassy Fire) refers to an event beginning with the occupation of the Spanish Embassy in Guatemala City, Guatemala, on 31 January 1980, by indigenous peasants of the Committee for Peasant Unity and their allies, which was responded to by a subsequent raid by Guatemalan police that resulted in a fire which destroyed the embassy and left 37 people dead. The incident has been called "the defining event" of the Guatemalan Civil War. Spain terminated diplomatic relations with Guatemala as a result.

== History ==
=== Background ===
In January 1980 a group of K'iche' and Ixil peasant farmers, recruited for a march to Guatemala City to protest the kidnapping and murder of peasants in Uspantán, in Quiché department, by elements of the Guatemalan Army. The peasants were organized, guided and joined by members of the Comité de Unidad Campesina (Committee of Peasant Unity) and a radical student organization known as the Robin García Revolutionary Student Front, groups associated with the Ejército Guerrillero de los Pobres (EGP, the Guerrilla Army of the Poor). The protesters were denied a hearing in Congress and their legal adviser was assassinated. On 28 January, they briefly took over two radio stations.

=== Incident ===
At 11:05 in the morning on 31 January 1980, the peasants, joined by workers and students, entered the Spanish Embassy in Guatemala City. According to police reports, some of the demonstrators were armed with machetes, pistols and Molotov cocktails.

Spain was considered sympathetic to the indigenous cause, especially after the Guatemalan Army came to be suspected of the murder of Spanish priests in the indigenous regions. Ambassador Máximo Cajal y López, who had visited the Ixil and Kiche regions in the previous weeks, was holding a meeting with former vice president of Guatemala Eduardo Cáceres Lenhoff, former Minister of Foreign Affairs Adolfo Molina Orantes, and lawyer Mario Aguirre Godoy when the group entered the embassy. The protesters announced that they had come to peacefully occupy the embassy and that they would hold a press conference at noon. They presented the ambassador with a letter that read in part, "We ... direct ourselves to you because we know you are honorable people who will tell the truth about the criminal repression suffered by the peasants of Guatemala." In 1978 an occupation of the Swiss Embassy by factory workers in a labour dispute had ended with a peaceful resolution.

President Fernando Romeo Lucas García, Guatemala City police chief Germán Chupina Barahona, and Minister of the Interior Donaldo Álvarez Ruiz met in the National Palace. Despite pleas by the Spanish ambassador to negotiate, a decision was taken to forcibly expel the group occupying the embassy. Shortly before noon, and before the protesters could air their grievances, about 300 armed state agents surrounded the building and cut the electricity, water and telephone lines. SWAT police proceeded to occupy the first and third floors of the building over the shouts of the ambassador that they were violating international law in doing so. The peasants barricaded themselves, along with the captive embassy staff and the visiting Guatemalan officials, in the ambassador's office on the second floor.

An order was given to charge the ambassador's office. Police breached the office door and introduced a substance, most likely white phosphorus, which together with the Molotov cocktails ignited a fire. Some academics and critics, including David Stoll and Jorge Palmieri, contend that it was the Molotov cocktails alone that started the blaze. Exactly how the fire started and who is responsible for it has been the subject of considerable controversy. It has also been noted that the action was a violation of international law, for the Ambassador had never granted permission for the police to enter the sovereign territory of the embassy. As fire consumed the second floor and the demonstrators and captive staff of the embassy were burned alive, police refused pleas from bystanders to allow firefighters to combat the blaze. A total of 37 people died in the fire, including former vice president Eduardo Cáceres, former Minister of Foreign Affairs Adolfo Molina Orantes and activist Vicente Menchú, father of Rigoberta Menchú, a future politician and Nobel Peace Prize-winner. Spanish Consul Jaime Ruiz del Árbol also died in the fire, along with other Spanish citizens employed by the embassy.

Ambassador Cajal y López survived by escaping through a window. The only other survivor, demonstrator Gregorio Yujá Xona, suffered third-degree burns. Both were sent to Herrera Llerandi Hospital for treatment. On 1 February, at 7:30 a.m., the police guard at Herrera Llerandi Hospital was withdrawn. Shortly thereafter a band of twenty armed men masked with bandanas, widely believed to be plainclothes members of the Judicial Police, entered the hospital and kidnapped Gregorio Yuja Xona. He was taken to an unknown location, tortured, and shot dead. His body was dumped on the campus of the University of San Carlos. Around his neck was a placard with a note that read "Brought to Justice for Being a Terrorist" and "The Ambassador will be next." Ambassador Cajal y López escaped the hospital with the assistance of other members of the diplomatic corps and eventually fled the country.

=== Aftermath and legacy ===
The Guatemalan government issued a statement claiming that its forces had entered the embassy at the request of the Spanish Ambassador, and that the occupiers of the embassy, whom they referred to as "terrorists," had "sacrificed the hostages and immolated themselves afterward." Ambassador Cajal denied the claims of the Guatemalan government and Spain immediately terminated diplomatic relations with Guatemala, calling the action a violation of "the most elementary norms of international law." Relations between Spain and Guatemala were not normalized until 22 September 1984.

Hundreds attended the funeral of the victims, and a new guerrilla group was formed commemorating the date, the Frente patriótico 31 de enero (Popular Front of 31 January).

Two years after the Guatemalan Peace Accords were signed, in 1998, Congress requested an investigation into the fire, which continued to divide Guatemalan society. As a result, the embassy fire received dedicated attention in both of the country's two truth commissions, the UN-sponsored Comisión para el Esclarecimiento Histórico (CEH) and the project for the Recovery of Historical Memory (REHMI), spearheaded by the Guatemalan Archdiocese. Both reports rejected the government's claims that protestors were responsible for the fire.

In 1999, Rigoberta Menchú filed a criminal complaint in Spain accusing former government officials of responsibility for the incident, including former Presidents Romeo Lucas García, Efraín Ríos Montt and Óscar Humberto Mejía Víctores. In 2005, a Spanish judge issued an arrest warrant holding former Guatemalan Interior Minister Donaldo Álvarez responsible for the incident. Álvarez was last seen in Mexico and is considered a fugitive.

On 30 January 2009, the eve of the 29th anniversary of the incident, the Guatemalan government filed 3,350 criminal complaints alleging human rights violations against former soldiers and paramilitaries.

On 20 January 2015, former SWAT police chief Pedro García Arredondo was sentenced to 40 years in prison for murder and crimes against humanity, for ordering that no one should be allowed to get out of the burning building alive. He was also sentenced to 50 additional years for killing two students at the funeral for the embassy fire victims. Prior to this conviction, Arredondo, who later became chief of the now-defunct National Police (Policía Nacional, PN), was already serving a 70-year prison sentence after being found guilty in 2012 of ordering the enforced disappearance of agronomy student Édgar Enrique Sáenz Calito during the country's long-running internal armed conflict,

The names of those who died in the burning of the Spanish embassy are commemorated in Guatemala City's main square, along with other victims of the Guatemalan Civil War.

== See also ==
- Guatemala–Spain relations
- 2017 Guatemala orphanage fire
