= Chimel =

Chimel may refer to:

- Chimel v. California, the United States Supreme Court case
- Laj Chimel, a small town in Guatemala

== People with the surname ==
- Tony Chimel, American wrestling announcer
