= David Stoll (anthropologist) =

American cultural anthropologist

David Matthew Stoll (born 1952) is an American public commentator and cultural anthropologist. His research has focused on the indigenous peoples of modern Latin America, and especially on the Mayas in Guatemala. He has been a professor of anthropology at Middlebury College since 1997.

== Education and early work ==
Stoll studied anthropology at the University of Michigan. He became interested in Protestant evangelism in Latin America and, as an independent researcher, investigated the role of the Summer Institute of Linguistics, focusing on its ties with Evangelical missionary work among the indigenous populations (see Wycliffe Bible Translators), as well as with its possible covert ties with the anti-communist foreign policy of the United States government. That work appeared in 1983 as Fishers of Men or Founders of Empire?, published by Zed Books.

Stoll began post-graduate work at Stanford University in 1985. He investigated the role of and impact upon the native Maya Ixil communities of Santa Maria Nebaj of the Guatemalan Civil War, at the peak of its violence in the early 1980s. Stoll received a doctorate in anthropology from Stanford in 1992. His doctoral advisor was William H. Durham.

== Work on Guatemala ==
Stoll's work among the native Mayas in the Guatemalan highlands led to two books: Between Two Armies in the Ixil Towns of Guatemala (1994) and Rigoberta Menchú and the Story of All Poor Guatemalans (1999). There Stoll argued that, contrary to the view then prevalent among foreign observers, the native population of rural Guatemala was never deeply or broadly committed to the leftist guerrillas' armed struggle against the Guatemalan state. According to Stoll, with the brutal counterinsurgency launched in the early 1980s by the Guatemalan Army, the Ixils found themselves "caught between two fires", with the guerrillas on one side and the army on the other. Stoll joined the faculty at Middlebury College's Department of Anthropology in 1997.

=== Rigoberta Menchú controversy ===
In Rigoberta Menchú and the Story of All Poor Guatemalans, David Stoll claimed that the life story of Guatemalan Nobel Peace Prize laureate Rigoberta Menchú, as she had told it to anthropologist Elizabeth Burgos in 1982 and as it was recounted in the book I, Rigoberta Menchú (published by Burgos in 1983), was not entirely consistent with the testimonies of her neighbors and relatives or with the documentary evidence. According to Stoll, although the basic elements of Menchú's testimony were true, significant aspects of it were distorted to make it more compatible with the Marxist ideology of the Guerrilla Army of the Poor (EGP), with which Menchú was affiliated at the time. Stoll also criticized anthropologists and historians for ignoring other indigenous testimonies that did not fit as well with their own political agendas.

Journalist Larry Rohter investigated Stoll's claims and wrote a story that appeared on the front page of The New York Times on December 15, 1998, shortly before Stoll's book came out in print. Rohter's story supported Stoll's main findings. Stoll's book attracted a great deal of attention and controversy upon its release. Anthropologist Victoria Sanford claimed that Stoll had used unreliable sources as his research informants and accused Stoll of historical negationism and victim blaming. Other critics generally accepted the factual evidence about Menchú's life offered by Stoll, but questioned his interpretations and argued that he had failed to recognize that Menchú's testimonio was part of a cultural tradition that legitimately incorporated communal experiences into an individual voice.

Stoll's Rigoberta Menchú and the Story of All Poor Guatemalans was re-issued in 2008 in an extended edition with a new foreword by Elizabeth Burgos. According to Mark Horowitz, William Yaworsky, and Kenneth Kickham, the controversy over Stoll's book on Menchú is one of the three most divisive events in the history of anthropology in the United States, along with controversies about the truthfulness of Margaret Mead's Coming of Age in Samoa and Napoleon Chagnon's representation of violence among the Yanomami.

=== Later work ===
Stoll continues to carry out research in the Guatemalan highlands. He has recently focused on immigration, microcredit, and what he argues is a financial bubble created by the two elements.

== Books ==
- Stoll, David (1983). Fishers of Men or Founders of Empire? The Wycliffe Bible Translators in Latin America. Zed Books. ISBN 978-0862321123.
- Stoll, David (1990). Is Latin America Turning Protestant? The Politics of Evangelical Growth. University of California Press. ISBN 978-0520076457.
- Garrard-Burnett, Virginia; Stoll, David, eds. (1993). Rethinking Protestantism in Latin America. Temple University Press. ISBN 978-1566391030.
- Stoll, David (1994). Between Two Armies in the Ixil Towns of Guatemala. Columbia University Press. ISBN 978-0231081832.
- Stoll, David (1999). Rigoberta Menchú And The Story Of All Poor Guatemalans. Westview Press. ISBN 0813336945. Republished in 2008 by Routledge in an extended edition with a foreword by Elizabeth Burgos ISBN 978-0813343969
- Stoll, David (2012). El Norte or Bust: How Migration Fever and Microcredit Produced a Financial Crash in a Latin American Town. Rowman & Littlefield Publishers. ISBN 978-1442220683.
