= Laj Chimel =

Coordinates: 15.5718°N 90.0106°W

Laj Chimel or Chimel is a community located in the cloud forest of the municipality of San Miguel Uspantán, Department of El Quiché, Guatemala. It is the birthplace of the 1992 Nobel Peace Prize winner Rigoberta Menchú. Currently it is only accessible by foot or by four-wheel drive vehicles, as the road through the mountains is unpaved. It is located a short distance north of the municipal capital San Miguel Uspantán, about 45 minutes to an hour in vehicle. The community consists of about 17 families, including some who returned to the area after being displaced during the Guatemalan Civil War.
