= Eduardo Cáceres =

Guatemalan politician

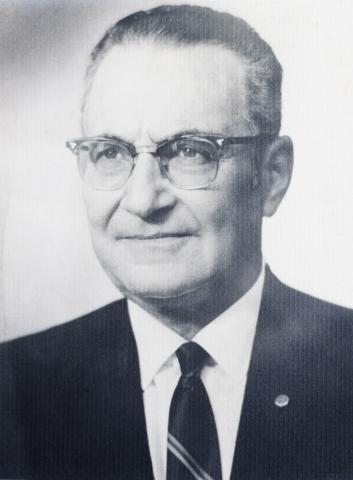
- Official portrait

Vice President of Guatemala
- In office 1 July 1970 – 1 July 1974
- President: Carlos Arana Osorio
- Preceded by: Clemente Marroquín
- Succeeded by: Mario Sandoval Alarcón

Personal details
- Born: June 2, 1906
- Died: January 31, 1980 (aged 73)
- Education: Universidad de San Carlos de Guatemala

Eduardo Rafael Cáceres Lehnhoff (2 June 1906 – 31 January 1980) was a Guatemalan politician who served as Vice President from 1 July 1970 to 1 July 1974 in the cabinet of Carlos Arana.

He was killed on 31 January 1980 in the burning of the Spanish Embassy in Guatemala City.

Preceded by Clemente Marroquín	Vice President of Guatemala; 1970-1974	Succeeded by Mario Sandoval
