= Sepur Zarco case =

Mass rape and murder during the Guatemala civil war

The Guatemalan Civil War went on from 1960-1996. Sepur Zarco is an indigenous Q'eqchi' community in Guatemala. In Sepur Zarco, Mayan Q'eqchi' peasant leaders had angered local landowners by fighting for the legal titles to the land upon which they had lived and worked for years. The landowners called in the army for protection.

The army declared the men of the community as far-leftist insurgents, captured them, and made them disappear. The women of the village were kept as sexual slaves. During the trial the Guatemalan national court examined the military strategies implemented against Q’eqchi’ indigenous women from the community of Sepur Zarco and recognized how the Guatemalan state used sexual violence as a weapon of war. K'iche' Mayan anthropologist Irma Alicia Velásquez Nimatuj was one of the trial's expert reporters.

In December 2021, the remains of 112 victims were handed to their families and buried in "the Site of Memory" which was built as a mausoleum to preserve the remains and for future generations to know the history of the community
