= Ana Cofiño =

Guatemalan anthropologist and historian

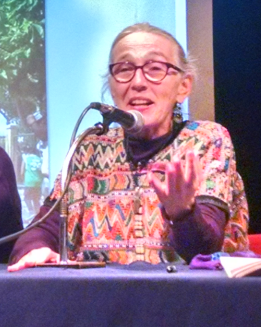
- Born: Ana María Cofiño Kepfer; 1955 (age 70–71); Guatemala
- Education: Universidad de San Carlos de Guatemala
- Occupations: Anthropologist, historian, editor

Ana María Cofiño Kepfer (born 1955) is a Guatemalan researcher, anthropologist, editor, and historian. She is the founder and co-editor of the feminist magazine La Cuerda and the bookstore El Pensativo. She is a prominent activist in favor of women's rights, gender equality, and the defense of indigenous communities from expropriation by the state and foreign companies.

== Biography ==
Ana Cofiño was born in a conservative and anti-communist Guatemalan family. She studied at a Catholic school for "well-off" girls, at which time she participated in the movement called CRATER, made up of young people who were involved in social programs as part of the church's renewal movement. Years later, she explained that her break with the Catholic Church was fundamental and a process. According to Cofiño:

If you are educated as a Christian or a Catholic, the first thing you carry, especially women, is guilt. Just getting rid of it is a revolution. When I began to question the existence of God, I was afraid that I would suddenly be struck by lightning. These ruptures are usually painful; they are a tremendous intellectual effort. If you break away you must be very clear about things, or else you are only assuming a pose.

She began to study at the Universidad de San Carlos de Guatemala, and later moved to Mexico to study at the National School of Anthropology and History, where she made a critical study of the Guatemalan condition, of its history. She came into contact with Guatemalan exiles, among them writers such as Carlos Illescas and the feminist Alaíde Foppa. When she finished her degree, she moved to San Cristóbal de las Casas, Chiapas, to prepare her thesis in the Maya area, a trip which changed her life, she explains. She founded the bookstore Soluna there.

In 1987 she returned to Guatemala with the expectation that the Vinicio Cerezo government, in which there were many women working, would represent a transformation for the country. She opened the Pensativo Bookstore in Antigua, where she began to publish works by Guatemalan and Central American authors.

Cofiño graduated with an anthropology degree from the Universidad de San Carlos when she concluded research on the feelings of Kaqchikel women on the exhumation of San Juan Comalapa.

In 1998 she founded the monthly publication La Cuerda, of which she was co-editor, backed by an association that aims to recover the prominence of women.

In 2012 she published, along with 17 other authors from La Cuerda, the book Nosotras, las de la Historia. Mujeres en Guatemala (siglos XIX–XXI) (We, of History. Women in Guatemala (19th–20th Centuries), recounting the history of Guatemalan women from a women's perspective.

== Publications ==
- 2008 – Emma Chirix conversa con Ana Cofiño. Colección Pensamiento.
- 2012 – Nosotras, las de la Historia. Mujeres en Guatemala (siglos XIX–XXI). Various authors. Edited by Ana Cofiño and Rosalinda Hernández Alarcón.
