= Committee for Peasant Unity =

Guatemalan Indigenous labor organization

The Committee for Peasant Unity (Spanish: Comité de Unidad Campesina, CUC) was an Indigenous Guatemalan labor organization. It has been described as the most potent peasant organization since the 1944–1954 Guatemalan Revolution.

== Formation ==
In the aftermath of the 1954 Guatemalan coup d'état, a series of leftist insurgencies began in the Guatemalan countryside, against the United States supported military governments of the country. A prominent guerrilla group among these insurgents was the Rebel Armed Forces (Spanish: Fuerzas Armadas Rebeldes, FAR). The FAR was largely crushed by a counter-insurgency campaign carried out by the Guatemalan government with the help of the U.S. in the late 1960s. Those of the FAR's leadership that had survived this campaign came together to form the Ejército Guerrillero de los Pobres (EGP) in Mexico City in the 1970s.

The Committee for Peasant Unity (Comité de Unidad Campesina) was launched on 15 April 1978, and was described by its founder Pablo Ceto as a convergence of the leftist insurgency and the Indigenous peoples' movements. Though it was a distinct organization, it had close ties to the EGP. It also drew upon the discontent with the government that led to widespread support for the EGP, and which was bolstered by the high rate of inflation for fertilizer in the late 1970s. The 1976 earthquake, which led to extensive damage in the highlands, also opened up a space for the CUC's activities. It has been described as Guatemala's first national labor organization that was led by Indigenous people. However, it also had a number of students and union members, as well as ladinos, and was supported by the guerrilla movement and the church. Although its leaders were often well-educated, it drew support from the inability of the political system to accommodate Mayan people, and incorporating Mayan organizing efforts that were more cultural in nature.

== Activities ==
The ideology of the CUC drew upon the cooperative movement, as well as on liberation theology. The organization initially operated in a clandestine manner, to avoid government persecution, but the scale of its support eventually led it to make a public appearance at the May Day celebrations in Guatemala City in 1978, at which it mobilized both Indigenous peasants and urban laborers, with the notion of beginning a united mass mobilization. The membership of the organization had increased to 150,000, and it also helped mobilize massive support for the EGP, which had 270,000 supporters at its height. Although it was strongest in the Guatemalan highlands, the CUC also had a substantial organization on the southern coast.

In early 1980, a strike led by the CUC forced the Guatemalan government to raise minimum wages by 200 percent, from an equivalent of U.S. $1.12 to $3.20. The strike involved 70,000 workers from sugarcane plantations, as well as 40,000 cotton pickers. In response, the government intensified its persecution of its critics, culminating in the Burning of the Spanish Embassy by police forces: a number of CUC members and university students had staged a peaceful occupation of the building, to protest land seizures and arbitrary killings in rural areas. The Police firebombed the building, killing a large number of people, including embassy officials, and members of the Guatemalan government. Spain broke diplomatic ties with Guatemala as a result. None of the demonstrators survived. CUC was heavily targeted by the Guatemalan government, particularly the military regime of Romeo Lucas Garcia, along with other rural cooperative movements.

== Civil war impacts ==
In July 1981 the Guatemalan Army found a number of safe houses in Guatemala City, and based on the information it found in them, began a systematic campaign against guerrillas in the countryside. The campaign was led by Benedicto Lucas García, the president's brother, who had received training in counterinsurgency from the French Armed Forces in Algeria. The army, supported by military vehicle shipments from the administration of U.S. President Ronald Reagan, began a scorched earth campaign. In 1981 alone, between 11,000 and 13,500 people were killed, many of them bystanders. Some sources have said that of the 40 founders of CUC, only three or four survived this campaign. By 1982, most of its activists had been slain.
