= Guerrilla Army of the Poor =

Guatemalan guerrilla organisation (1972-1997)

- Ejército Guerrillero de los Pobres
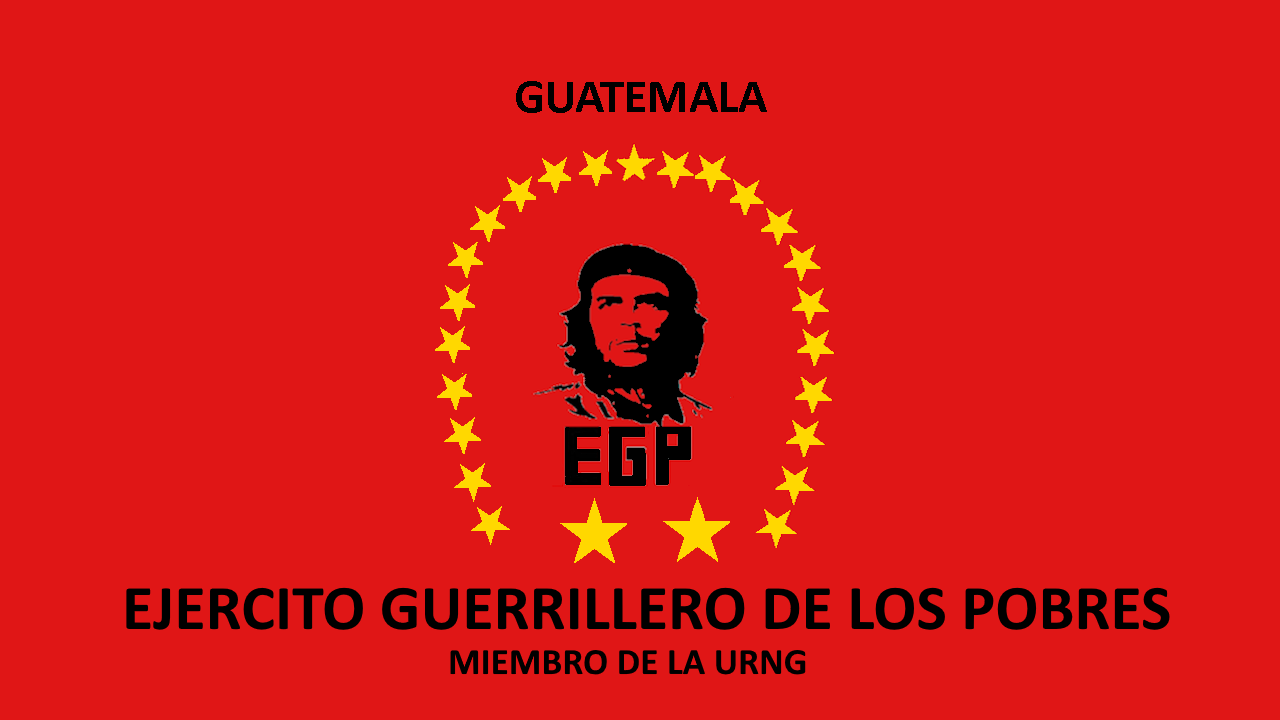
- Flag of the Ejército Guerrillero de los Pobres
- Leader: Rolando Morán
- Dates active: 19 January 1972 – 15 February 1997
- Active regions: Guatemala
- Ideology: Communism; Marxism–Leninism; Liberation theology Guevarism
- Political position: Far-left
- Size: 10,000 (1981)
- Part of: URNG
- Wars: Guatemalan Civil War

The Guerrilla Army Of The Poor (Spanish: Ejército Guerrillero de los Pobres, EGP) was a Guatemalan leftist guerrilla movement, which commanded significant support among indigenous Maya people during the Guatemalan Civil War.

== Formation ==
In the aftermath of the 1954 Guatemalan coup d'état a series of leftist insurgencies began in the Guatemalan countryside, against the United States-supported military governments of the country. A prominent guerrilla group among these insurgents was the Rebel Armed Forces (Spanish: Fuerzas Armadas Rebeldes, FAR). The FAR was largely crushed by a counter-insurgency campaign carried out by the Guatemalan government with the help of the U.S. in the late 1960s. Between 2,800 and 8,000 FAR supporters were killed, and hundreds of leftists in urban areas were kidnapped, assassinated, or disappeared. Those of the FAR's leadership that had survived this campaign came together to form the EGP in Mexico City in the 1970s. These leaders included Ricardo Ramírez (whose nom de guerre was Rolando Morán), Julio César Macías (known as César Montes), both Ladinos, Luis Augusto Turcios Lima, a former military officer trained in the School of the Americas, and a number of Indigenous Mayan leaders. The EGP primarily worked out of the Ixcan region and received wide spread support from the indigenous populace there.

== Ideology ==
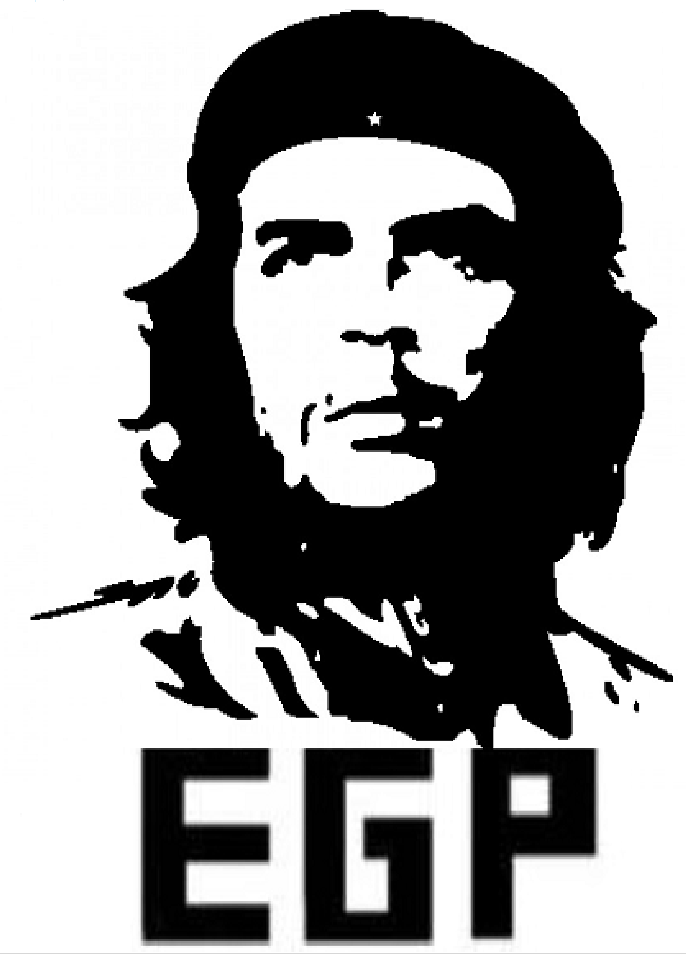
Shield of the EGP, inspired by Che Guevara's famous photo

The new group had several ideological differences from the prior FAR. The FAR had based its ideology on the foco theory of Che Guevara. Che Guevara believed that people living in countries still ruled by colonial powers, or living in countries subject to newer forms of economic exploitation, could best defeat colonial powers by taking up arms. Several of the new EGP felt that it had not sufficiently taken into account the racial discrimination experienced by the Indigenous Maya people in Guatemala, and that this had limited their support. The EGP drew inspiration from the success of the Viet Cong and the North Vietnamese army in resisting U.S. forces in the Vietnam War. They saw parallels between Guatemala and Vietnam, in that both countries were largely agrarian, and they both saw a struggle between capitalism and communism, and both saw heavy intervention from the U.S. to protect its economic interests. As a result, the EGP decided to include civilians more actively in their projects and made non-combatants a part of the revolutionary movement. The EGP saw their role as not only incorporating the issues that the civilians were concerned about but also "instructing" them in their political beliefs.

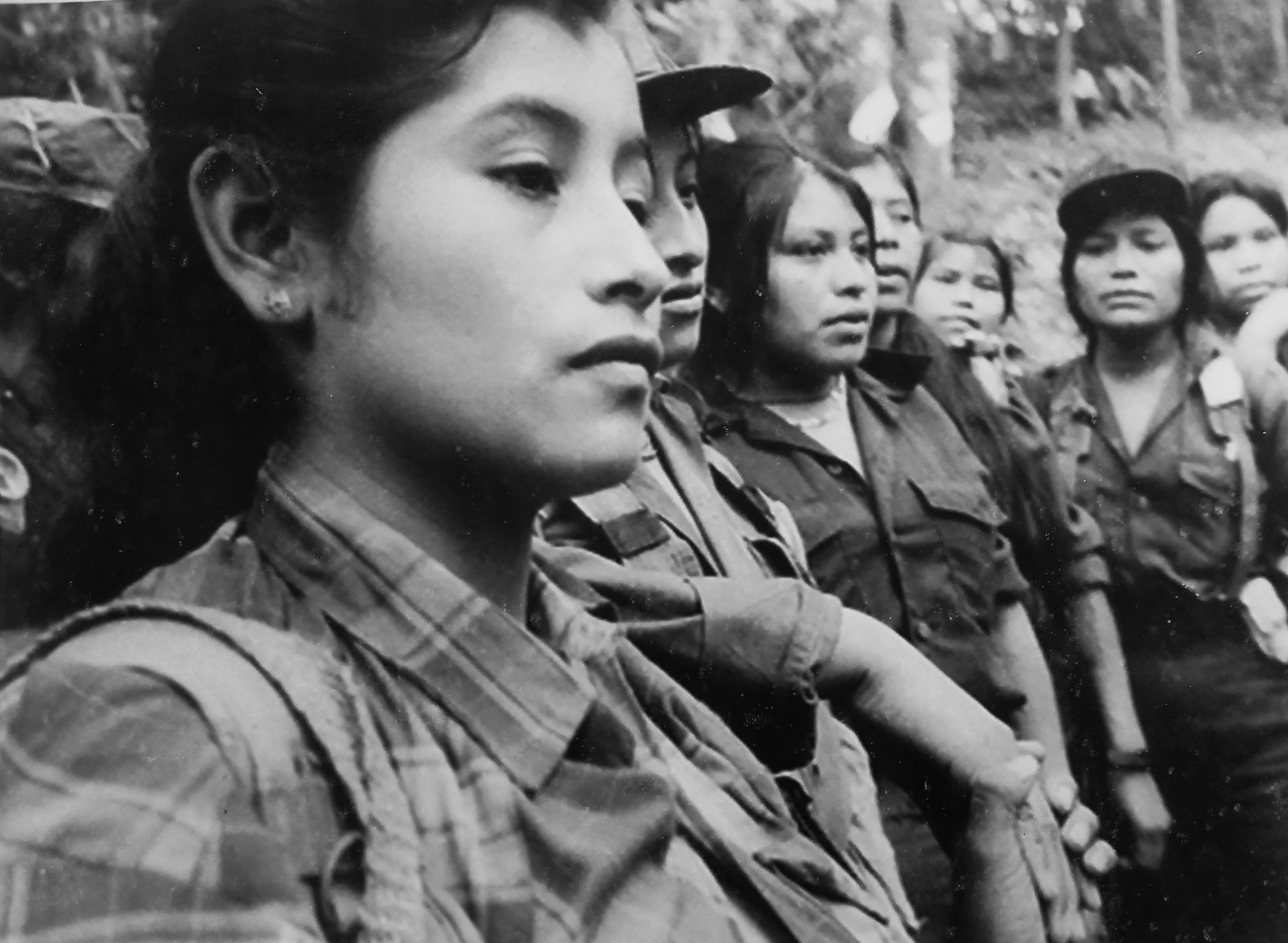
Women in the guerrilla ranks, unknown location

The EGP also followed liberation theology, and utilized its Catholic supporters and networks to build a coalition of revolutionary campesinos, Catholics, and indigenous Maya people. The organization was described as overwhelmingly composed of the indigenous and radicalized Catholics. The organization considered indigenous militants to be important revolutionary allies, and was influenced by the Maoist concept of the protracted people's war, aspiring to launch its own version. The organization dedicated itself to building popular support among poor peasants, Catholics and Maya people for years before committing its first action. The EGP stressed the importance of the "Indian question" and wanted to create a multiethnic socialist Guatemala, wishing to integrate the concerns regarding ethnic oppression of the indigenous population with class struggle. At its height, the EGP was estimated to have the support of 250,000-500,000 indigenous people and the EGP itself around 360,000 in its ranks. Many indigenous villagers joined the ranks of the EGP because of their ideological support and even participated in the EGP without pay.

== Activities ==
The EGP made its existence public in 1975, by playing a role in the execution of two Ladinos seen as the "region's most notorious oppressors."

=== Assassination of Guillermo Monzón ===
On May 28, 1975, the EGP committed its first public action - the execution of Guillermo Monzón. Monzón was a military commissioner in the Xalbal cooperative of Ixcán, Quiché. Known as a Ladino landowner and army informant, Monzón reportedly had strong differences with other Indigenous landowners from the same cooperative. He was also believed to have created a list of people he believed to be guerrilla supporters, which made him a target for the EGP.

On the day of the assassination, he was ambushed, executed, and buried on the spot by EGP members. His body was discovered by locals four days later, leading his family to permanently leave the area. This incident marked the EGP's first action in the Guatemalan Civil War and brought them into the public eye.

Following Monzón's assassination, the Guatemalan army launched a crackdown on the Xalbal cooperative. On June 10, 1975, army paratroopers and ground forces entered the area, arresting numerous individuals and establishing a military presence at a nearby agrarian transformation facility. According to reports, some detainees were tortured and subsequently disappeared.

=== Assassination of José Luis Arenas ===
On June 7, 1975, the EGP carried out the assassination of José Luis Arenas, a wealthy Ladino finca owner in the Ixcán area. He was connected at high levels of the Guatemalan government, and had been accused of mistreating workers and engaging in land conflicts with neighboring communities. As a result, he was targeted by the EGP as part of their strategy to gain support among indigenous and peasant populations. The EGP deemed him to be a symbol of oppression, and acting on complaints received from locals, carried out their offensive.

The attack took place at Arenas' La Perla estate, where Arenas had gathered to pay his workers. Disguised among the crowd of around 200-300 laborers, four EGP members approached the office where José Luis Arenas was located and opened fire. Arenas soon lay dead as a result of six bullet wounds, with two farmers injured as a result of the gunfire, one becoming paralyzed from a bullet wound.

After the execution, the guerrilla members addressed the public in the Ixil language. They proclaimed themselves members of the EGP, and stated that they had assassinated the "Tiger of Ixcán". The incident reportedly amassed local support for the guerrilla movement, with some residents viewing the act as a form of social justice given the reported abuses committed by Arenas.

=== Growing influence and response from the government ===
The Guatemalan army started to indiscriminately target indigenous civilians as early as early as 1972, believing a new insurgency group had formed, that being the EGP. The combatants of the EGP returned to Guatemala on 19 January 1972, and had added a number of recruits by 1975. According to EGP founder Mario Payeras, these included a number of Mayans from several different tribes. At its height, the EGP had the support of 250,000-500,000, while the army estimated the number at 360,000 across the regions of Quiché, Chimaltenango, Huehuetenango, and Verapaces, in the Guatemalan highlands. These supporters included students, poor Ladinos, and a large number of Indigenous people.

In early 1980, a strike led by the CUC forced the Guatemalan government to raise minimum wages by 200 percent. In response, the government intensified its persecution of its critics, culminating in the Burning of the Spanish Embassy by police forces. A number of countries, including Spain, broke diplomatic relations with Guatemala following this incident, damaging the legitimacy of the government, and giving the EGP a chance to intensify its military activities. The EGP released a document proclaiming that the burning was an example of the racial persecution of the Indigenous People and that the EGP's struggle was related to this. This intensification of the EGP's activities led to the Guatemalan army establishing a presence in the area, and using kidnappings and torture to intimidate the population. A declassified CIA document from late February 1982 states that in mid-February 1982 the Guatemalan army had reinforced its existing forces and launched a "sweep operation in the Ixil Triangle. The commanding officers of the units involved have been instructed to destroy all towns and villages which are cooperating with the EGP and eliminate all sources of resistance" These style of attacks mirrored US style counter insurgency tactics used in the Vietnam War; additionally, many Guatemalan army officers were trained by the US in the School for the Americas for such a reason.

Civilian patrols formed by the army perpetrated further human rights abuses, such that when Guerrillas were offered an amnesty by the government in 1983, the EGP asked its local supporters to accept it. The ability of the army to suppress the local support of the EGP has been attributed to military aid given to it by Israel and Argentina, as well as by the U.S. government after Ronald Reagan became president in 1981.

== United States involvement ==
The United States was involved in the Guatemalan Civil War within the context of the Cold War to stop the spread of socialism and communism especially within Latin American which they considered their "backyard". The US was involved in training and supplying the Guatemalan military. Military officers were trained at the US' School of the Americas, a school initially used for training Latin American countries in defense against international threats. However, its focus eventually shifted to counterinsurgency as many US allied governments faced domestic threats. During US President Jimmy Carter's administration (1977 to 1981), the United States made human rights a primary focus and any nation receiving US aid had to adhere to their policy. However numerous Latin American countries facing socialist insurgencies still received aid from the Carter administration despite their poor human rights record. Latin America expert William LeoGrande summarized: "When Washington confronted the choice between assisting a righteous regime battling insurgency, or risking grill of victory, it could not, In the wake of the revolution in Nicaragua, bring itself to allow a guerrilla triumph. To prevent another Nicaragua, the Carter administration, its commitment to human rights notwithstanding, armed the reactionary military. The facade of reform, rather than its substance, became sufficient justification for US support." Following the election of Ronald Reagan in 1981, the Guatemalan military received increased and unrestricted support from the US to combat the insurgency including the EGP. The US supplied weapons and helicopters to the military. According to historian Stephen G. Rabe, around 80,000 Guatemalans died in the civil war during the first year and a half of the Reagan administration.

== Genocide ==
During the Guatemalan civil war some 300,000 people were killed. Both the Guatemalan military and insurgency forces such as the EGP committed human rights violations such as rape, torture, kidnappings, assassinations, and murder.The UN Truth Commission found that the vast majority of violations were committed by the Guatemalan government and military. The Commission found that 93% of all killed and disappeared was committed by Guatemalan government sanctioned forces compared to 3% by groups such as the EGP.

== Aftermath ==
=== CUC ===
While Guatemala has made efforts to move beyond its past, the country still remains extremely divided. By 1984, the large-scale massacres were generally over, the army had set up new bases throughout the Mayan heartlands and had accrued unprecedented economic power through the seizure of vast tracts of productive land and a number of key state institutions. An organization the EGP used to mobilize supporters was the Committee for Peasant Unity (Spanish: Comité de Unidad Campesina, CUC). This group was launched on 15 April 1978, and was described by its founder Pablo Ceto as a convergence of the leftist insurgency, and the Indigenous People's movement. Though it had close ties to the EGP, it was its own distinct organization. The CUC works in over 200 communities and six micro-regions of the country to defend the land, water, and food rights of impoverished peasants in Guatemala, primarily in communities facing displacement or environmental damage by mining, dam, and industrial agriculture corporations.

=== URNG ===
The URNG is an umbrella group of Guatemalan political and revolutionary groups that spearheaded peace talks that took place all around the world. The URNG started as a guerrilla movement and was founded on February 7, 1982, and became a legal political party in 1998 after the Peace Process which ended the Guatemalan Civil War. The primary function of the URNG was to support the leftist beliefs of the Guatemalan civilians and to negotiate peace with the Guatemalan government. The Guatemalan insurgents of the 1980s traced their roots to the 1944-1954 "decade of revolution." Today's guerrilla leadership claims a special tie with the "unfinished revolution" of President Jacobo Arbenz. While the URNG attempts to balance peace, Guatemala, still to this day suffers from extremely high levels of inequality, with the Indigenous populations suffering the worst. Despite representing more than half of the population and participating actively in the country's economy, the Indigenous people's political participation is not equitably reflected.

=== Peace process ===
While government-URNG peace talks took place across the world, the Guatemalan government weakened. After years and years of fighting for justice, the parties returned to peace talks facilitated by the United Nations in 1993, which were ultimately successful. The Commission for Historical Clarification, which was a group that was created to clarify human rights violations related to the thirty-six year internal conflict from 1960 to the United Nations' brokered peace agreement of 1996, was established on June 23, 1994, as a part of a peace agreement between the Guatemalan government and the URNG. At the end of 1996, the Government of President Alvaro Arzu Irigoyen, together with the URNG, with the participation of the United Nations as moderator and with the support of the international community, concluded a long negotiating process, by signing the Peace Accords. The URNG plays a current role in Guatemalan politics and is still active today fighting for equal rights. During the elections in 2011, the party entered into a political alliance with Winaq, MNR, the URNG splinter ANN and may other civil society groups to form the Broad Front of the Left. The UNRG is still fighting for political representation but is making an avid effort to be a part of political decisions and regulations.

== Notes and references ==
Notes

Sources

- McAllister, Carlota (2010). "A Headlong Rush into the Future". In Grandin, Greg; Joseph, Gilbert (eds.). A Century of Revolution. Durham, NC: Duke University Press. pp. 276–309.
- Bahbah, Bishara (1986). Israel and Latin America: The Military Connection. Palgrave Macmillan. ISBN 978-1349091959.
- Jonas, Susanne (1991). The Battle for Guatemala: Rebels, Death Squads, and U.S. Power. Westview Press. ISBN 978-0813306148.
- Grassroots International. "Peasant Unity Committee (CUC)."
- Costello, Patrick. "Historical Background: Accord Guatemala." Conciliation Resources.
- Sanford, Victoria. "Between Rigoberta Menchú and La Violencia." Latin American Perspectives 26, no. 6, 1999
- Rotheberg, Daniel "Guatemala Memory of Silence", 2016
- Truth Commission: Guatemala, United States Institute of Peace, 1997
- Loding, Torge "Wahlen in Guatemala 2011: Präsident Colom hat sich verrechnet" Standpunkte (in German). Rosa Luxemburg Stiftung
- Guatemalan National Revolutionary Unity (UNRG)
