= Cabinet of Jimmy Morales =

Fiftieth cabinet of Guatemala

Morales Cabinet
- Cabinet of Guatemala
- 2016–2020
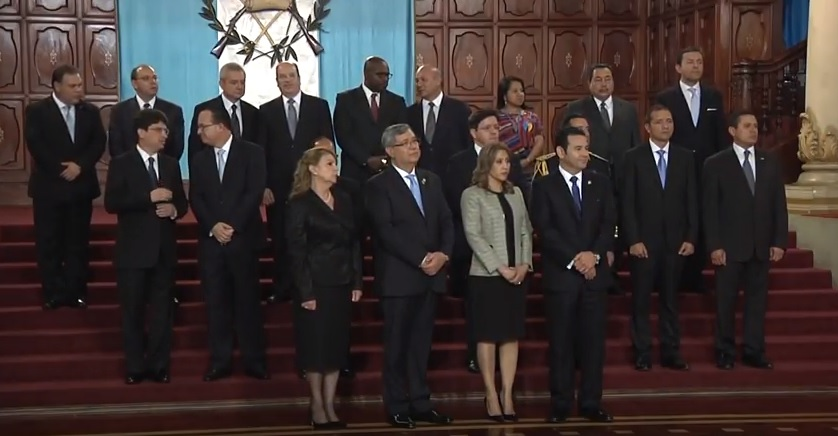
- Date formed: January 14, 2016
- Date dissolved: January 14, 2020

People and organisations
- President: Jimmy Morales
- Vice President: Jafeth Cabrera
- No. of ministers: 14
- Member party: National Convergence Front; Unionist; Independent

History
- Election: 2015 Guatemalan general election
- Predecessor: Cabinet of Alejandro Maldonado
- Successor: Cabinet of Alejandro Giammattei

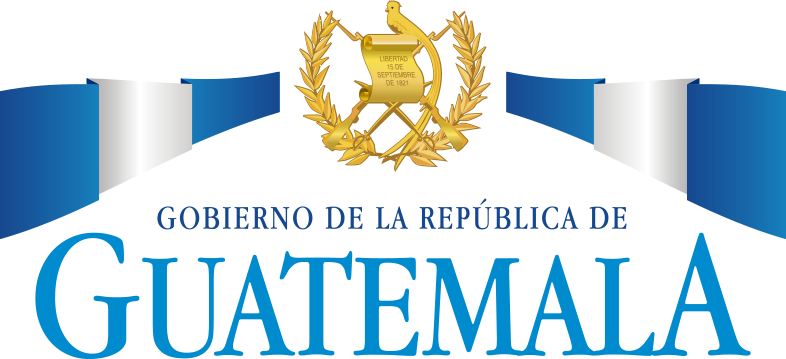
Logo used by the Government during Jimmy Morales' presidency

The Cabinet of Jimmy Morales was the fiftieth cabinet of Guatemala.

The cabinet took office on 14 January 2016 and ended on 14 January 2020.

== Composition ==
Portfolio	Minister	Took office	Left office	Party
Minister of Agriculture, Livestock and Food	Mario Méndez Cóbar	14 January 2016	14 January 2020	Independent
Minister of Environment and Natural Resources	Sydney Samuels Wilson	14 January 2016	16 January 2018	Independent
Minister of Environment and Natural Resources	Alfonso Alonzo Vargas	16 January 2018	14 January 2020	FCN
Minister of Communications, Infrastructure and Housing	Sherry Ordóñez Castro	14 January 2016	25 January 2016	Independent
Minister of Communications, Infrastructure and Housing	José Luis Benito Ruiz	25 January 2016	2 February 2016	Independent
Minister of Communications, Infrastructure and Housing	Aldo García Morales	2 February 2016	13 April 2018	Independent
Minister of Communications, Infrastructure and Housing	José Luis Benito Ruiz	13 April 2018	14 January 2020	Independent
Minister of Culture and Sports	José Luis Chea Urruela	14 January 2016	12 November 2018	Independent
Minister of Culture and Sports	Elder Súchite Vargas	12 November 2018	14 January 2020	Independent
Minister of National Defense	Williams Mansilla Fernández	14 January 2016	2 October 2017	Military
Minister of National Defense	Luis Miguel Ralda Moreno	2 October 2017	19 December 2019	Military
Minister of National Defense	Albin Dubois Ramírez	19 December 2019	14 January 2020	Military
Minister of Social Development	José Guillermo Moreno Cordón	14 January 2016	8 August 2017	Independent
Minister of Social Development	Ennio Galicia Muñoz	8 August 2017	16 January 2018	Independent
Minister of Social Development	Alcides René Obregón Muñoz	16 January 2018	23 April 2018	Independent
Minister of Social Development	Carlos Velásquez Monge	23 April 2018	14 January 2020	Independent
Minister of Economy	Rubén Morales Monroy	14 January 2016	29 April 2017	Independent
Minister of Economy	Víctor Asturias Cordón	29 April 2017	16 January 2018	Independent
Minister of Economy	Acisclo Valladares Urruela	16 January 2018	14 January 2020	Independent
Minister of Education	Óscar Hugo López Rivas	14 January 2016	14 January 2020	Independent
Minister of Energy and Mines	José Pelayo Castañón	14 January 2016	26 April 2016	Independent
Minister of Energy and Mines	Luis Alfonso Chang Navarro	26 April 2016	14 January 2020	Independent
Minister of Public Finance	Julio Héctor Estrada	14 January 2016	13 September 2018	Independent
Minister of Public Finance	Víctor Martínez Ruiz	13 September 2018	14 January 2020	Unionist
Minister of the Interior	Francisco Rivas Lara	14 January 2016	26 January 2018	Independent
Minister of the Interior	Enrique Degenhart Asturias	26 January 2018	14 January 2020	Unionist
Minister of Foreign Affairs	Carlos Raúl Morales Moscoso	14 January 2016	27 August 2017	Independent
Minister of Foreign Affairs	Sandra Jovel Polanco	27 August 2017	14 January 2020	Valor
Minister of Public Health and Social Assistance	Alfonso Cabrera Escobar	14 January 2016	26 July 2016	Independent
Minister of Public Health and Social Assistance	Lucrecia Hernández Mack	26 July 2016	29 August 2017	Independent
Minister of Public Health and Social Assistance	Carlos Soto Menegazzo	29 August 2017	14 January 2020	Independent
Minister of Labor and Social Welfare	Leticia Teleguario Sincal	14 January 2016	18 September 2018	Independent
Minister of Labor and Social Welfare	Gabriel Aguilera Bolaños	18 September 2018	14 January 2020	Independent

Preceded by Maldonado Cabinet	Morales Cabinet; 2016–2020	Succeeded by Giammattei Cabinet
