= Cabinet of Alejandro Maldonado =

Maldonado Cabinet
- Cabinet of Guatemala
- 2015–2016
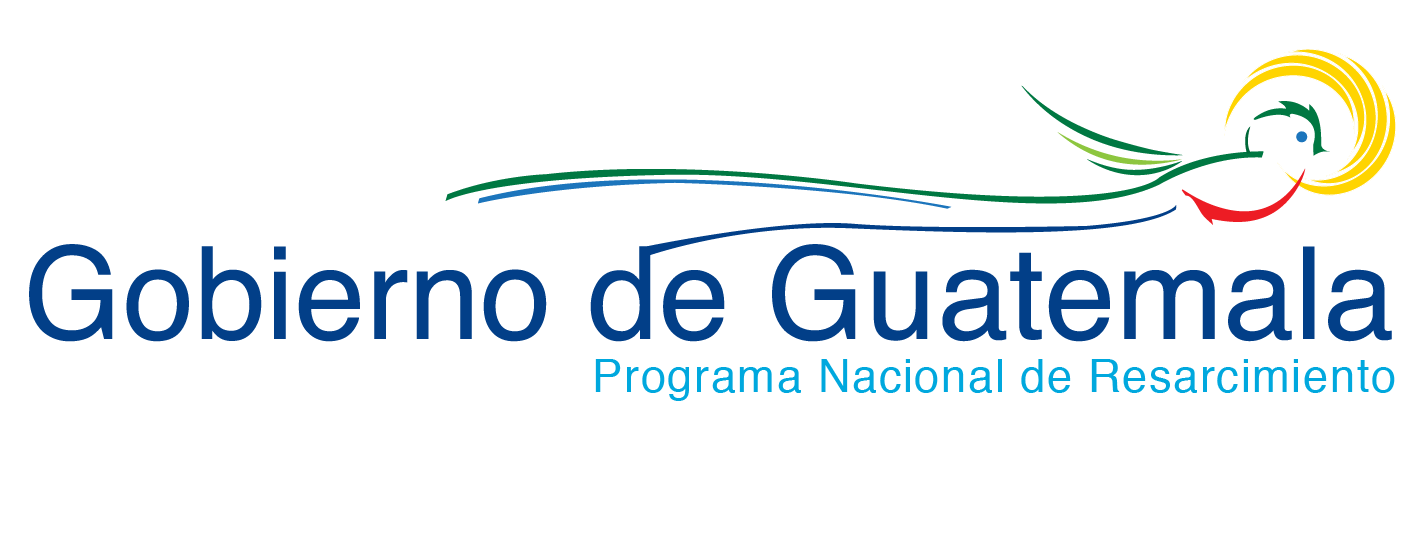
- Logo used by the Government during Maldonado's presidency.
- Date formed: September 3, 2015
- Date dissolved: January 14, 2016

People and organisations
- President: Alejandro Maldonado
- Vice President: Juan Alfonso Fuentes Soria
- No. of ministers: 14
- Member party: Independent

History
- Predecessor: Cabinet of Otto Pérez Molina
- Successor: Cabinet of Jimmy Morales

The Cabinet of Alejandro Maldonado was the forty-ninth cabinet of Guatemala.

The cabinet took office on 3 September 2015 and ended on 14 January 2016.

== Composition ==
Portfolio	Minister	Took office	Left office	Party
Minister of Agriculture, Livestock and Food	José Sebastián Marcucci	3 September 2015	14 January 2016	Independent
Minister of Environment and Natural Resources	Oscar Medinilla Sánchez	3 September 2015	21 September 2015	Independent
Minister of Environment and Natural Resources	Andreas Lehnhoff Temme	21 September 2015	14 January 2016	Independent
Minister of Communications, Infrastructure and Housing	Víctor Corado Váldez	3 September 2015	14 January 2016	Independent
Minister of Culture and Sports	Dwight Pezzarossi	3 September 2015	21 September 2015	PP
Minister of Culture and Sports	Ana María Rodas	21 September 2015	14 January 2016	Independent
Minister of National Defense	Williams Mansilla	3 September 2015	14 January 2016	Military
Minister of Social Development	Leonel Rodríguez Lara	3 September 2015	29 September 2015	PRI
Minister of Social Development	Norma Haydée Quixtán	29 September 2015	14 January 2016	Independent
Minister of Economy	Ricardo Sagastume	3 September 2015	29 September 2015	LIDER
Minister of Economy	Jorge Méndez Herbruger	29 September 2015	14 January 2016	Independent
Minister of Education	Eligio Sic Ixpancoc	3 September 2015	17 September 2015	Independent
Minister of Education	Rubén Alfonso Ramírez	17 September 2015	14 January 2016	Independent
Minister of Energy and Mines	José Miguel de la Vega Izeppi	3 September 2015	29 September 2015	Independent
Minister of Energy and Mines	Juan Pablo Ligorría	29 September 2015	14 January 2016	Independent
Minister of Public Finance	Dorval Carías Samayoa	3 September 2015	14 January 2016	Independent
Minister of the Interior	Eunice Mendizábal	3 September 2015	14 January 2016	Independent
Minister of Foreign Affairs	Carlos Raúl Morales Moscoso	3 September 2015	14 January 2016	Independent
Minister of Public Health and Social Assistance	Werner Ramírez Rivas	3 September 2015	29 September 2015	Independent
Minister of Public Health and Social Assistance	Mariano Rayo Muñoz	3 September 2015	14 January 2016	Unionist
Minister of Labor and Social Welfare	Carlos Ulban López	3 September 2015	17 September 2015	Independent
Minister of Labor and Social Welfare	Leonel Oswaldo Enríquez	17 September 2015	14 January 2016	Independent

Preceded by Pérez Cabinet	Maldonado Cabinet; 2015–2016	Succeeded by Morales Cabinet
