= Carlos Soto Menegazzo =

Guatemalan politician

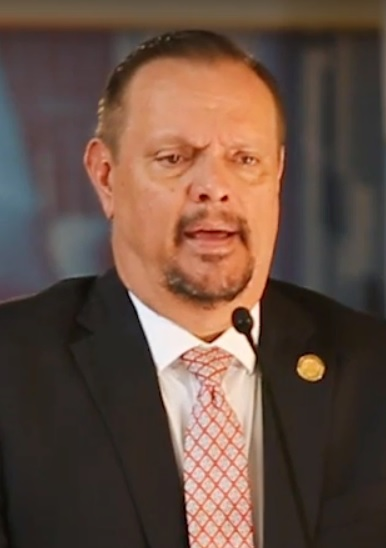
- Menegazzo in 2019

Minister of Public Health and Social Assistance
- In office August 29, 2017 – January 14, 2020
- President: Jimmy Morales
- Preceded by: Lucrecia Hernández Mack
- Succeeded by: Hugo Monroy

Personal details
- Born: August 26, 1951 (age 75) Guatemala City
- Education: Universidad de San Carlos de Guatemala
- Occupation: doctor

Carlos Enrique Soto Menegazzo (born August 26, 1951) is a Guatemalan cardiologist and politician who served as Minister of Public Health and Social Assistance from 2017 to 2020 under the government of Jimmy Morales.

== Career ==
On August 29, 2017, he was appointed to replace Lucrecia Hernández Mack as Minister of Public Health. Hernández had announced her resignation the Sunday before, in protest over President Jimmy Morales ordering the expulsion of United Nations anti-corruption investigator Iván Velásquez Gómez.

Since February 2014, he had served as director of Roosevelt Hospital until that day.

== Personal life ==
He is son of Carlos Armando Soto Gómez y Odilia Perina Menegazzo Vanfrette, his father was Minister of Health too from 1986 to 1990 and deputy of the Guatemalan National Constituent assembly of 1984.

He married whit Beatriz Díaz in 1969 and they divorced in 1989. He married for the second time with Lucrecia Torcelli in 1989.
