= Víctor Martínez Ruiz =

Guatemalan economist and politician

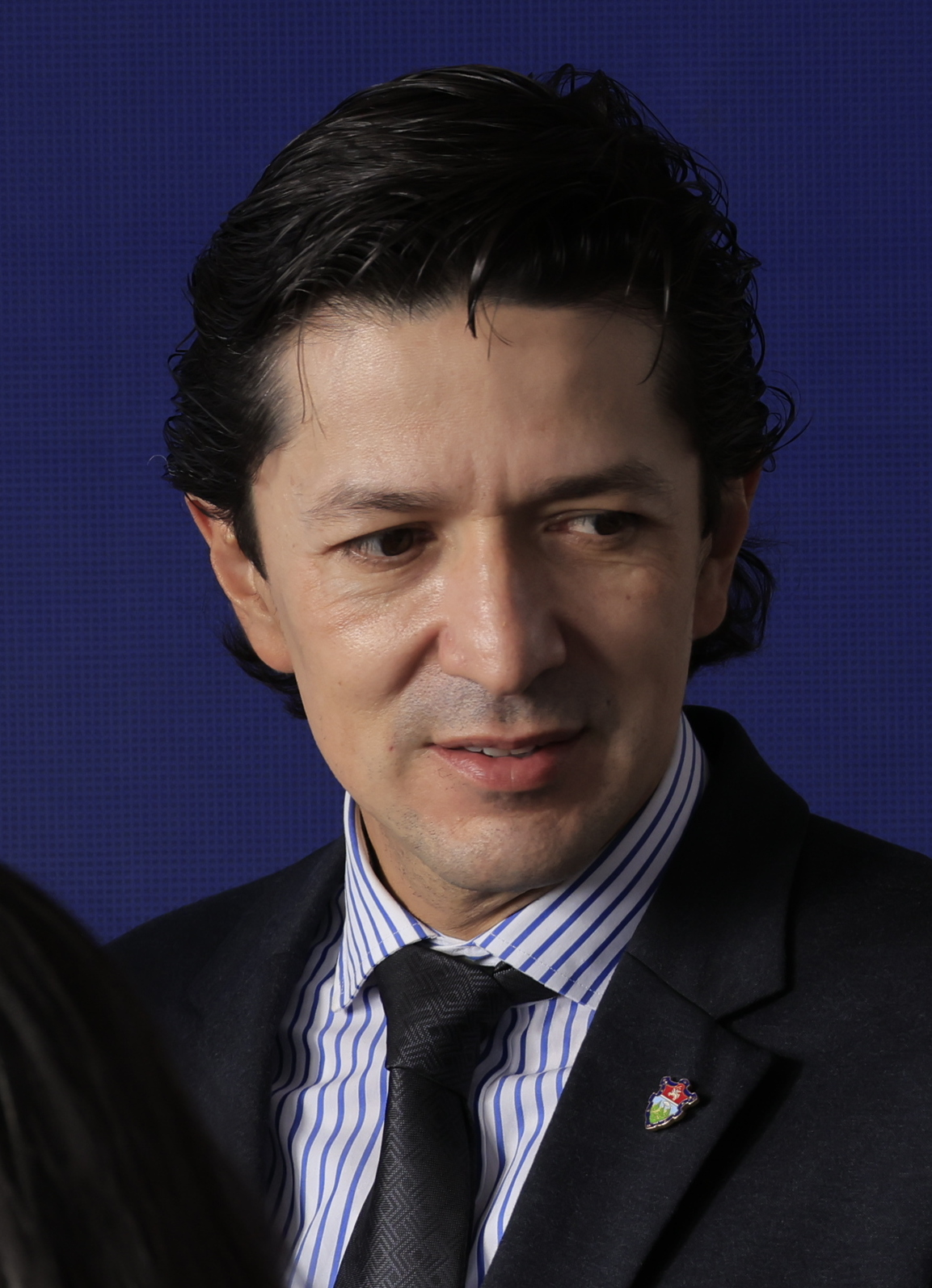

First Councillor of Guatemala City
- Incumbent
- Assumed office 15 January 2020
- Mayor: Ricardo Quiñónez
- Preceded by: Ricardo Quiñónez

Minister of Finance
- In office 14 September 2018 – 14 January 2020
- President: Jimmy Morales
- Preceded by: Julio Héctor Estrada
- Succeeded by: Alvaro González Ricci

Deputy Minister of Financial Administration
- In office 21 January 2016 – 13 September 2018
- President: Jimmy Morales
- Preceded by: Édwin Martínez
- Succeeded by: Kildare Stanley Enríquez

Second Councilor of Guatemala City
- In office 15 January 2012 – 15 January 2020
- Mayor: Álvaro Arzú; Ricardo Quiñónez
- Preceded by: Alessandra Gallio Abud
- Succeeded by: Alessandra Gallio Abud

First Syndic of Guatemala City
- In office 15 January 2008 – 15 January 2012
- Mayor: Álvaro Arzú
- Preceded by: Ricardo Quiñónez
- Succeeded by: Luisa María Salas Bedoya

Personal details
- Born: Víctor Manuel Martínez Ruiz; January 19, 1982 (age 44) Guatemala City, Guatemala
- Party: Unionist Party
- Education: Francisco Marroquin University
- Profession: Business administrator, economist, politician

Víctor Manuel Alejandro Martínez Ruiz (born January 19, 1982) is a Guatemalan economist and politician who served as the Minister of Public Finance from September 2018 to January 2020. He currently is the First Councilor of Guatemala City.

== Early years ==
He studied Business Administration with a specialization in Finance from the School of Economic Sciences of the Francisco Marroquín University (UFM) is graduated Cum laude.

In 2003 he began his work as financial manager of several private real estate, spare parts and agro-industrial companies.

== Career ==
In 2002 he directed the executive part of the Foundation for Integral Development (FUDI in Spanish). He has served as a professor of political philosophy and general administration in some universities in the country.

Víctor Martínez started working in the Municipality of Guatemala as a Financial consultant in 2006, in the 2011 elections he was elected to the position of second councilor for the 2012-2016 term and won another term from 2016 to 2020. He was head of the directorates of trusts for urban planning, director of the boards of directors of the Municipal Transport Company, Municipal Water Company and the Transport and Transit Regulatory Entity.

=== Government of Jimmy Morales ===
In January 2016 he was integrated into Jimmy Morales' cabinet as Deputy Minister of Financial Administration for that he had to request permission in Municipality of Guatemala.

After the resignation of Julio Héctor Estrada, Martínez was appointed as Guatemala's Minister of Finance on September 13, 2018. When he was sworn in, he assured that he would work for the Guatemalan Parliament to approve the State budget for 2019, in addition to forming the General Directorate of Acquisitions and a registry of State suppliers.

During his administration, the problem occurred over the purchase of 2 planes from the Argentine government for the Guatemalan Air Forces, even President Morales had gone to Argentina to meet with President Macri. A problem arose because the purchase was intended to be made through an agreement between the two countries, but opponents of the government assured that this was illegal. Martínez Ruiz pointed out that Guatemala does not have the necessary financial resources for this acquisition, however, President Morales and Minister Ralda insisted. Finally the purchase did not materialize.

== Legal issues ==
On June 14, 2019 the Anti-Impunity Prosecutor's office filed a case against the municipal council, just two days before the elections. The accusation was because supposedly from their position in the city council they tried to campaign in favor of the municipal government party. After leaving his position as minister, he appeared on January 16, 2020, in the court in charge of the case.

Political offices
Preceded by Julio Héctor Estrada	Minister of Finance; 2018–2020	Succeeded by Alvaro González Ricci
Preceded by Ricardo Quiñónez	Deputy Mayor of Guatemala City; 2020–present	Incumbent
