= José Alfonso Cabrera =

Guatemalan politician

Minister of Public Health and Social Assistance
- In office 14 January 2016 – 1 August 2016
- President: Jimmy Morales
- Preceded by: Mariano Rayo
- Succeeded by: Lucrecia Hernández Mack

José Alfonso Cabrera Escobar is a Guatemalan politician who was appointed Minister of Public Health and Social Assistance by President Jimmy Morales in January 2016. He resigned for personal reasons in August 2016 and was replaced by Lucrecia Hernández Mack.
