= Henry Sáenz Ramos =

Guatemalan politician

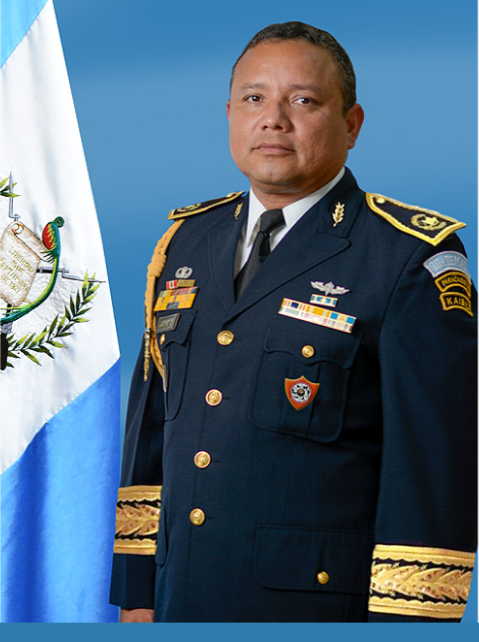

Minister of National Defense
- Incumbent
- Assumed office 15 January 2024
- President: Bernardo Arévalo
- Preceded by: Henry Reyes Chigua

Henry David Sáenz Ramos is a Guatemalan military officer who has served as the Minister of National Defense, since 15 January 2024, under the government of Bernardo Arévalo. He previously served as the head of the administrative department of the military industry from 1 January to 14 August 2015.

Saenz Ramos holds a master's degree in Resource and Technology Management and another in Public Security and PhD in Political Sciences and Security. He is the author of several academic research papers as well as co-authored with William Oswaldo Sierra Sam the book "Manual de comunicación estratégica y amenazas de la desinformación para la seguridad del estado de Guatemala" (Manual of Strategic Communication and Disinformation Threats to the Security of the State of Guatemala).
