= Enrique Antonio Degenhart Asturias =

Guatemalan politician

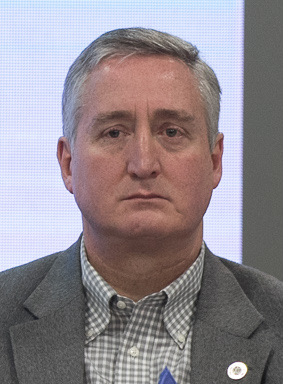
- Degenhart in 2019

Minister of the Interior
- In office 26 January 2018 – 14 January 2020
- President: Jimmy Morales
- Preceded by: Francisco Rivas Lara
- Succeeded by: Edgar Godoy Samayoa

Personal details
- Born: October 9, 1968 (age 57) Guatemala City
- Party: Unionist Party
- Occupation: Politician, businessman

Enrique Antonio Degenhart Asturias (born October 9, 1968) is a Guatemalan politician who served as the Minister of the Interior from January 26, 2018, to January 14, 2020, during the presidency of Jimmy Morales.

== Biography ==
Degenhart was born in Guatemala in 1968. He worked as a public official in the General Directorate of Immigration, becoming the director of said institution from 2010 to 2012. He was an immigration advisor in the United States Department of Homeland Security, in Customs Control in Texas from 2012 to 2015 and in Virginia Customs Control from 2015 to 2018. Degenhart had a long friendship with the late former mayor of Guatemala City Álvaro Arzú, who died in 2018.

=== Minister of the Interior ===
On January 26, 2018, President Jimmy Morales appointed him Minister of the Interior, replacing Francisco Rivas Lara.

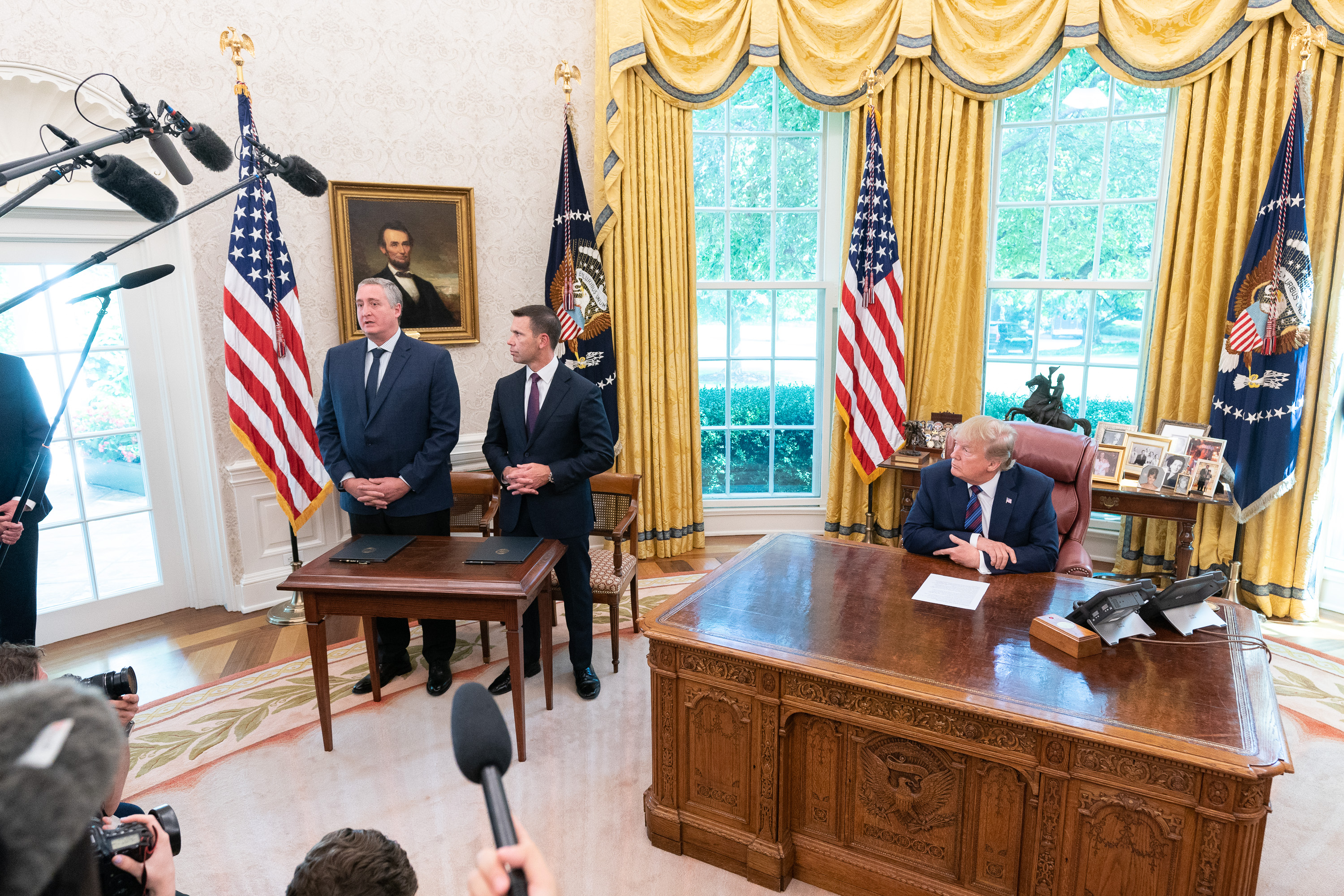
Press conference given in the Oval Office on the day the agreement was signed.

During his tenure as minister, he was in charge of negotiating and representing Guatemala in the signing of the controversial "Safe Third Country" immigration agreement with the United States in the administration of President Donald Trump. The agreement was criticized by the Democratic Party, the Guatemalan opposition and the then presidential candidates Alejandro Giammattei and Sandra Torres, who called the agreement "dark" and "lack of transparency."

=== Political activity ===
Following his departure from office on January 14, 2020, he began to participate in Unionist Party political events and was appointed Deputy Secretary General of the Unionist Party in November 2021. At that time it was rumored that he would possibly be a presidential or vice-presidential candidate proposed by that party to participate in the 2023 general elections, but in December 2022 it was announced that he would be a candidate for deputy for the Central District for the Valor-Unionist coalition in the second box behind Sandra Jovel.

After the June 25 elections, it was confirmed that he was unable to enter as a member of Congress because the coalition only won one seat.
