= Leticia Teleguario =

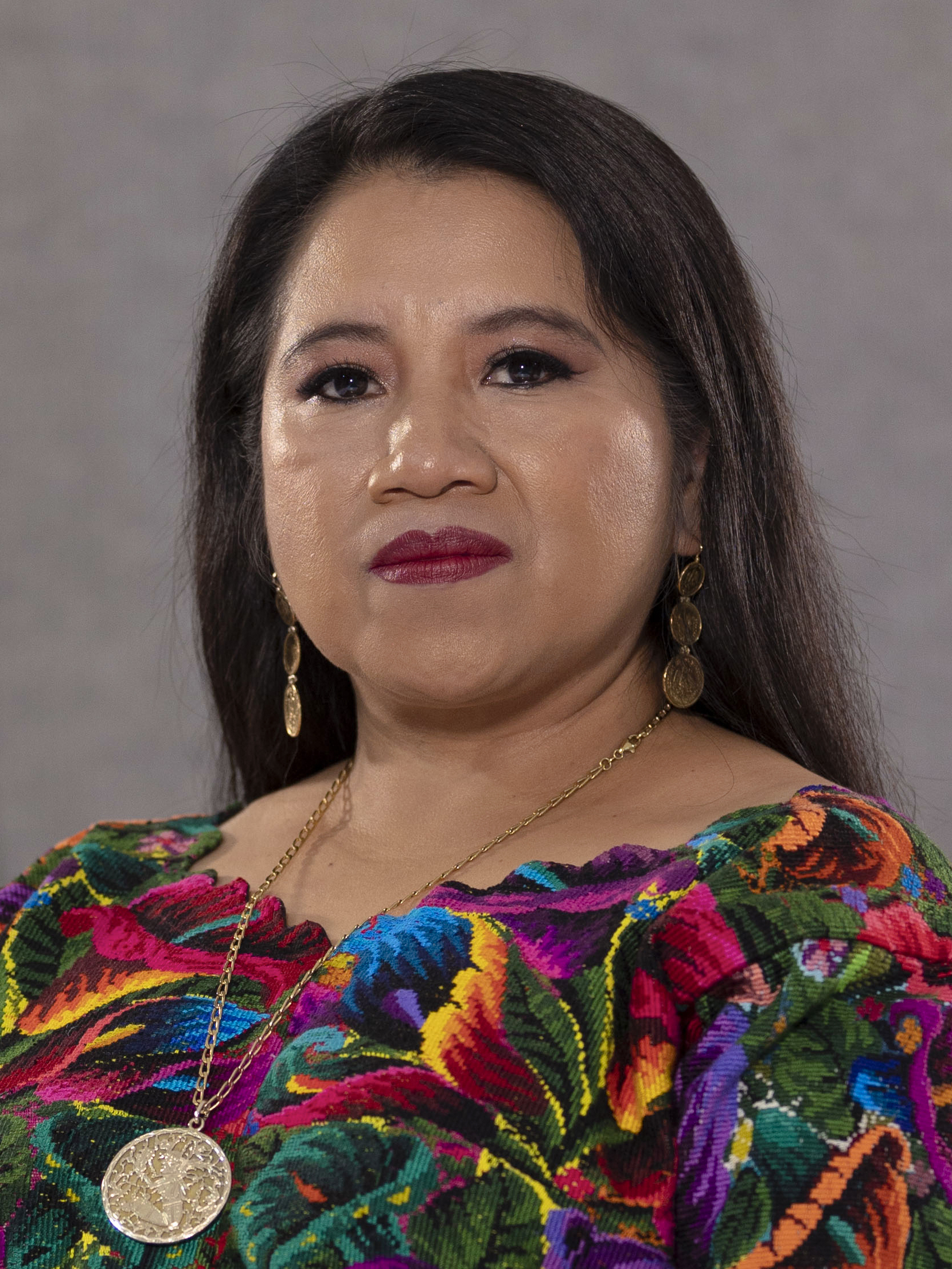
- Official portrait

Minister of Labor and Social Welfare
- In office January 14, 2016 – January 14, 2020
- President: Jimmy Morales
- Preceded by: Oswaldo Enríquez
- Succeeded by: Bladimir Aguilera Bolaños

Leticia Teleguario is a Kaqchikel politician and Indigenous rights activist who served as Guatemala's Minister of Labor and Social Welfare from January 2016 to September 2018 under the government of Jimmy Morales.
