= Luis Miguel Ralda Moreno =

Guatemalan politician

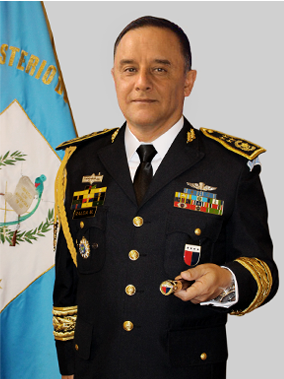
- Official portrait

45th Minister of Defence
- In office 1 October 2017 – 19 December 2019
- President: Jimmy Morales
- Preceded by: Williams Mansilla
- Succeeded by: Albin Dubois Ramírez

Personal details
- Born: January 17, 1963 (age 62); Guatemala City, Guatemala
- Spouse: Ingrid Patricia Quinto
- Children: 2

Luis Miguel Ralda Moreno (born 17 January 1963) is a Guatemalan military officer who served as the Minister of National Defense from 1 October 2017 to 19 December 2019 under the government of Jimmy Morales.
