= Menegazzo =

Menegazzo is a surname. Notable people with the surname include:

- Antonio Menegazzo (1931–2019), Italian Roman Catholic bishop
- Carlos Soto Menegazzo (born 1951), Guatemalan politician
- Fernando Menegazzo (born 1981), Brazilian footballer
- Peter Menegazzo (1944–2005), Australian grain grower and cattle baron
