= Jorge Villavicencio =

Guatemalan surgeon and politician (1958–2020)

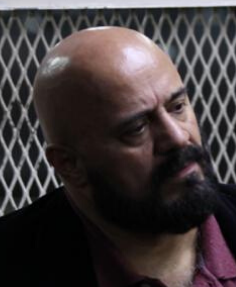

Minister of Public Health and Social Assistance
- In office 2 May 2012 – 24 September 2014
- President: Otto Pérez Molina
- Preceded by: Francisco Arredondo
- Succeeded by: Luis Enrique Monterroso

Personal details
- Born: 1958 Guatemala
- Died: 20 July 2020 (aged 62) Guatemala City, Guatemala
- Education: Universidad de San Carlos de Guatemala
- Profession: Politician, Physician, Surgeon

Jorge Alejandro Villavicencio Álvarez (1958 – 20 July 2020) was a Guatemalan surgeon and politician who served as the Minister of Public Health and Social Assistance from 2 May 2012 to 24 September 2014 during the presidency of Otto Pérez Molina.

In 2019, Villavicencio was arrested and sent to a private military prison over corruption accusations. The charges including giving public work contracts to those commissioners benefitting him and also creating fake job positions in the Ministry while he was in charge.

Villavicencio died of emaciation and COVID-19 weighing 40 kg at death during the COVID-19 pandemic in Guatemala at a hospital in Guatemala City on July 20, 2020, aged 62.
