= Hilda González Klusmann =

Guatemalan military

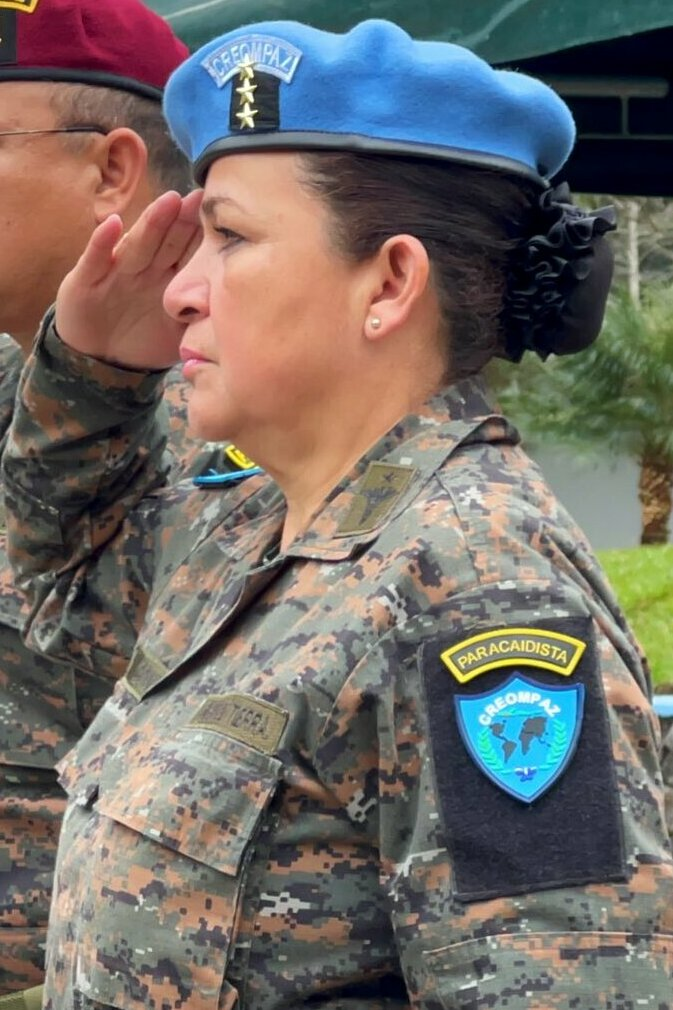
- Education: Military School of Nursing of Mexico
- Military career
- Allegiance: Guatemala
- Branch: Guatemala Army
- Rank: Military Health Colonel
- Commands: Regional Peacekeeping Operations Training Command

Hilda Obeyda González Klusmann is a Guatemalan military who serves as commander of the Regional Peacekeeping Operations Training Command of the Armed Forces of Guatemala since 2024. She is the first female commander of the Armed Forces of Guatemala in its history.

== Biography ==
González was born into a military family, as her parents and her brother belonged to the Guatemalan Army. She was awarded a scholarship by the Ministry of National Defense to study at the Military Nursing School of Mexico, where she graduated in 1994. González admits that she would have preferred to enter the Polytechnic School of Guatemala to be a cadet, however, at that time they did not admit women yet.
