= Albin Dubois Ramírez =

Guatemalan politician

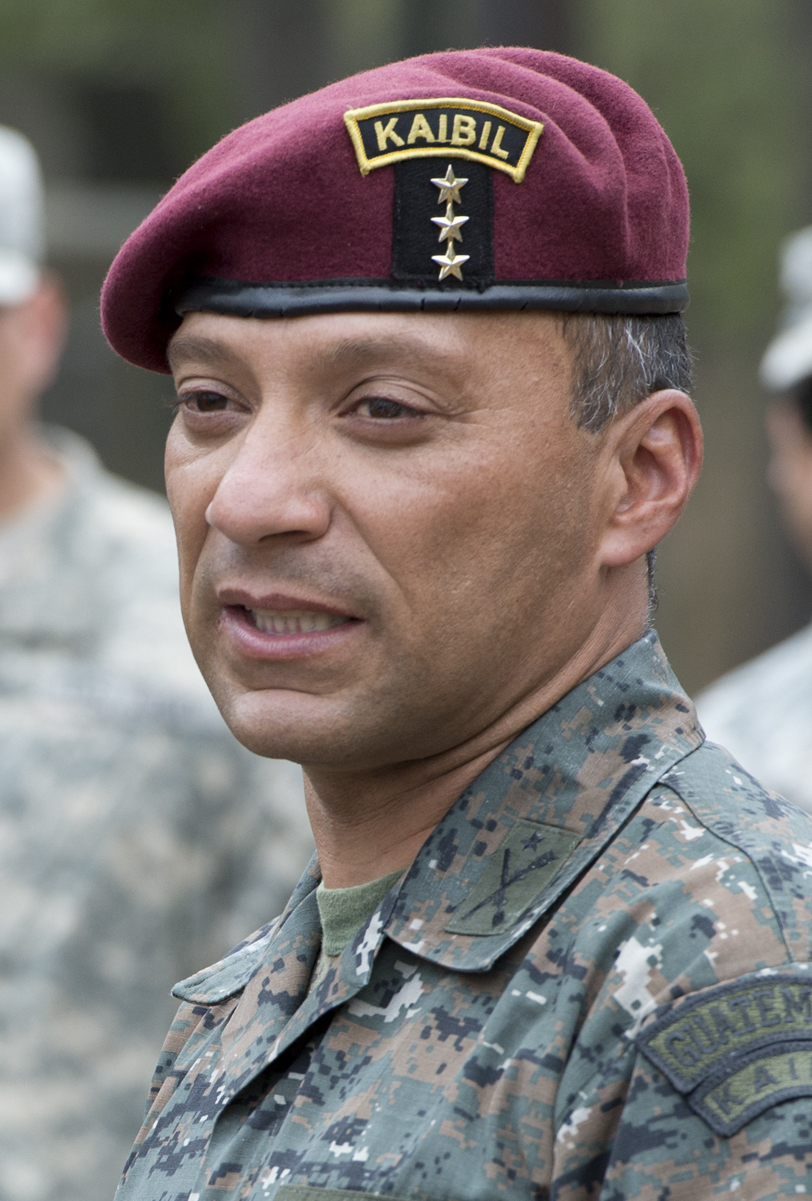

Minister of Defence
- In office 19 December 2019 – 14 January 2020
- President: Jimmy Morales
- Preceded by: Luis Miguel Ralda
- Succeeded by: Juan Carlos Alemán Soto

Albin Enrique Dubois Ramírez was Guatemala's Minister of National Defence.
