= Miriam Roquel Chávez =

Guatemalan politician

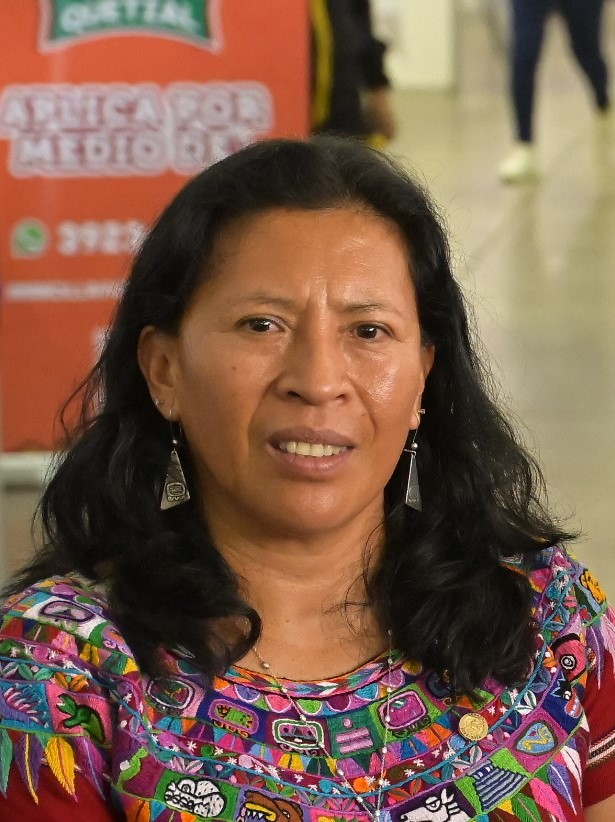

Minister of Labor and Social Welfare
- Incumbent
- Assumed office 15 January 2024
- President: Bernardo Arévalo
- Preceded by: Rafael Rodríguez Pellecer

Personal details
- Born: San José Chacayá, Guatemala
- Party: Winaq
- Education: Universidad de San Carlos de Guatemala; Rafael Landívar University

Miriam Roquel Chávez is a Mayan Guatemalan lawyer, and politician who has served as the Minister of Labor and Social Welfare, since January 2024, under the government of Bernardo Arévalo. She holds a master's degree in human rights, and was also previously Deputy Attorney of the Human Rights Prosecutor's Office. In July of 2024, Chávez met with OAS over the issue of the Facilitation of labor inclusion of asylum seekers and refugees in Guatemala.
