= Juan Carlos Alemán Soto =

Minister of Defence of Guatemala

Juan Carlos Alemán
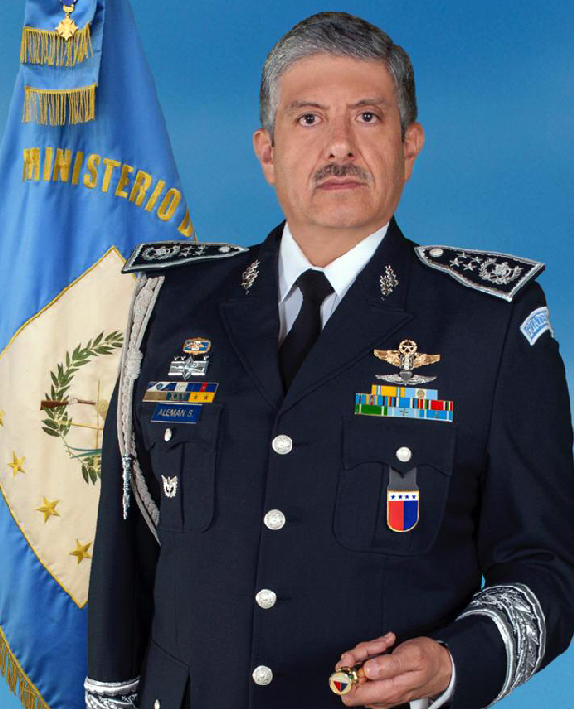
- Official portrait

Minister of Defense
- In office 14 January 2020 – 21 December 2021
- President: Alejandro Giammattei
- Preceded by: Albin Dubois Ramírez
- Succeeded by: Henry Reyes Chigua

Personal details
- Born: March 23, 1966 (age 58); Guatemala City, Guatemala
- Children: 2

Juan Carlos Alemán Soto (born 23 March 1966) was Guatemala's Minister of National Defense.
