= Edgar Godoy Samayoa =

Guatemalan politician (1949–2021)

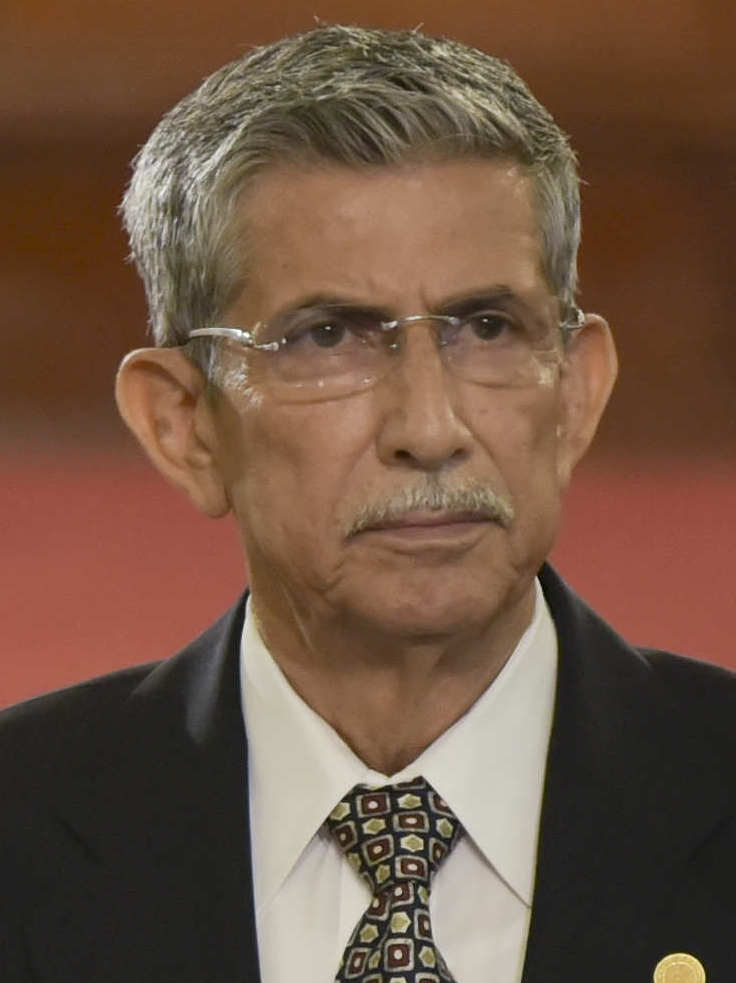
- Official portrait, 2020

Minister of the Interior
- In office 14 January 2020 – 4 June 2020
- President: Alejandro Giammattei
- Preceded by: Enrique Degenhart
- Succeeded by: Oliverio García Rodas

Personal details
- Born: 21 January 1949
- Died: 22 April 2021 (aged 72) Guatemala City, Guatemala

Edgar Leonel Godoy Samayoa (21 January 1949 – 22 April 2021) was a Guatemalan military officer and politician who served as the Minister of the Interior during the Giammattei administration from January to June 2020. He previously served as Chief of the General Staff during the Serrano administration from July to December of 1991.

Godoy died on 22 April 2021.
