= Óscar Hugo López Rivas =

Guatemalan politician

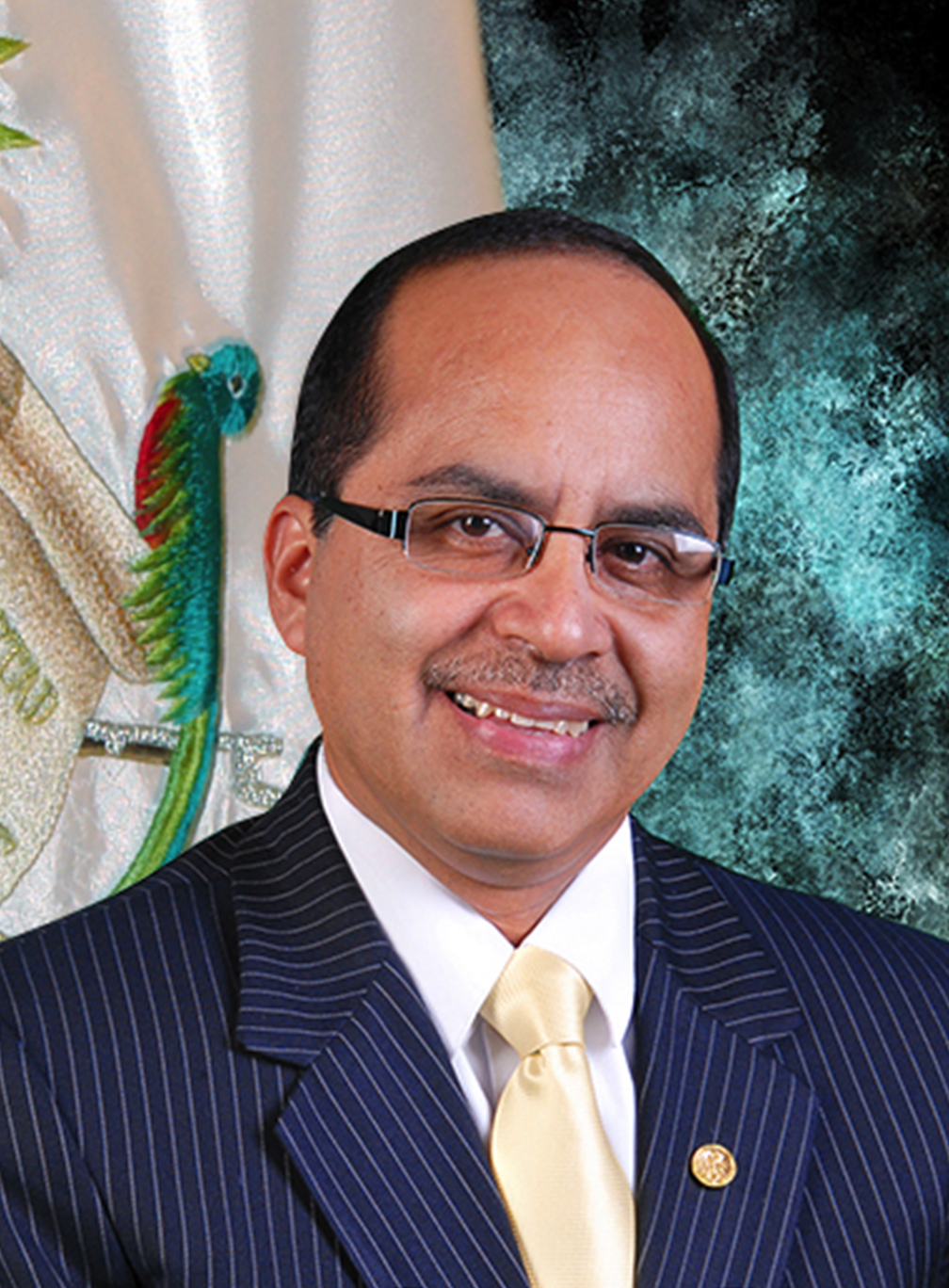
- Official portrait

Minister of Education
- In office January 14, 2016 – January 14, 2020
- President: Jimmy Morales
- Preceded by: Rubén Alfonso Ramírez
- Succeeded by: Claudia Ruíz Casasola

Personal details
- Born: January 25, 1967 (age 59) Huehuetenango, Guatemala
- Education: Universidad de San Carlos de Guatemala; Universidad La Salle de Costa Rica
- Awards: JICA President Award

Óscar Hugo López Rivas is a Guatemalan professor and politician who served as the Minister of Education from 2016 to 2020 under the government of Jimmy Morales.
