= Acisclo Valladares Urruela =

Guatemalan lawyer

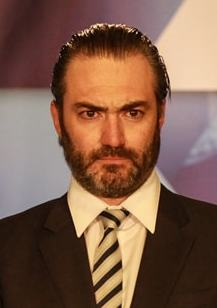
Valladares Urruela in 2018

Acisclo Valladares Urruela is a Guatemalan attorney and notary who served as Economics Minister during the administration of President Jimmy Morales. Previously he held the post of Special Mission Appointed Ambassador to attend to the international agenda related to the Alliance for the Prosperity of the North Triangle Plan and General Coordinator of the executive committee of the National Competitiveness Program, PRONACOM.

In August 2020 Valladares Urruela was charged by the Miami, Florida US Federal Court of conspiring to commit money laundering. Valladares Urruela appeared before that court in October and hearing has been set for January 2021. The Guatemalan office of the Attorney General (Ministerio Público) and the UN-backed International Commission against Impunity in Guatemala (CICIG) had filed in May 2019 impeachment proceedings against him for attempts between 2012 and 2015 to influence votes in the Guatemalan legislature in favor of Tigo, the telephone company he headed. In August 2019, a Congress Investigative Commission in Guatemala recommended not to proceed with the impeachment and preserved his immunity. However, on 7 July 2022 Valladares Urruela pled guilty in Miami federal court to transferring $350,000 in bribery payments and receiving $140,000 as part of the money laundering scheme, and agreed to cooperate with the U.S.'s Attorney's Office.

== Political and business career ==
Valladares Urruela was appointed in August 2015 as the Guatemalan Presidential Commissioner for Competitiveness and Investment. Previously he had been the general director of the Tigo Foundation and president of the Guatemalan Telecommunications Union. He was also Chief of Corporate Affairs for the same telephone company.

He is the son of Acisclo Valladares Molina, current ambassador for Guatemala to the United Kingdom since 2010 and former Ambassador to the Holy See 2000-2004/2008-2010.

== Charges against him ==
In 2019, the Guatemalan Prosecutor's Office and UN-backed International Commission against Impunity in Guatemala (CICIG) filed impeachment proceedings against him for alleged attempts between 2012 and 2015 to influence votes in the Guatemalan legislature in favor of Tigo, the telecom company he worked for. CICIG was expelled from Guatemala by president Jimmy Morales after his brother and son were also named in cases of corruption rendering moot its role in the complaint. In August 2019, an Investigative Commission of the Guatemalan Congress recommended not to proceed with the impeachment and let Valladares retain immunity.

On January 15, 2020, Valladares Urruela submitted to a court in Guatemala and on January 16 the prosecutor's office raided his home in an attempt to arrest him. On January 28, Valladares Urruela issued a statement arguing charges were motivated politically.

Valladares Urruela was charged in August 2020 by the Miami, Florida US Federal Court of helping launder close to $10 million, including illegal drug proceeds, as part of a network involving corrupt politicians and a “crooked bank employee”. Valladares Urruela appeared before court in October and hearing was set for January 2021.

In a previous FBI criminal complaint he was accused of using cocaine profits to make the bribery payments but did not plead guilty to that allegation. On 7 July 2022 Valladares Urruela pled guilty in Miami federal court to transferring $350,000 in bribery payments and receiving $140,000 as part of the money laundering scheme, and agreed to cooperate with the U.S.'s Attorney's Office.
