= Heinz Heimann =

Presidential Spokesperson

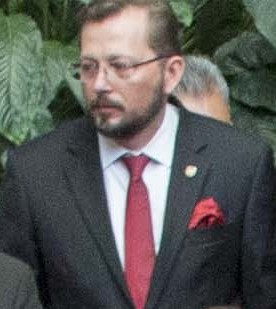
- Hiemann in 2017

Presidential Spokesperson
- In office 14 January 2016 – 19 June 2018
- President: Jimmy Morales
- Preceded by: Alejandro Palmieri
- Succeeded by: Layla Lemus

Personal details
- Born: Heinz Harold Heimann Ochaita; Guatemala

Heinz Harold Heimann Ochaita is a Guatemalan writer and academic who served as the presidential spokesperson for the Jimmy Morales government from January 14, 2016, until June 19, 2018.

During his tenure as presidential spokesman, Heimann attracted some controversy over his brief statements on the decisions or opinions of Morales. He was dismissed by the Secretariat of Social Communication of the Presidency of Guatemala after issuing statements explaining that the government respected the immigration policies of U.S. President Donald Trump, in which more than 2,000 Guatemalan children were separated from their families. This was criticized by various national and international actors. The Guatemalan government subsequently issued a statement distancing themselves from the statements and also announcing their dismissal of Heimann.

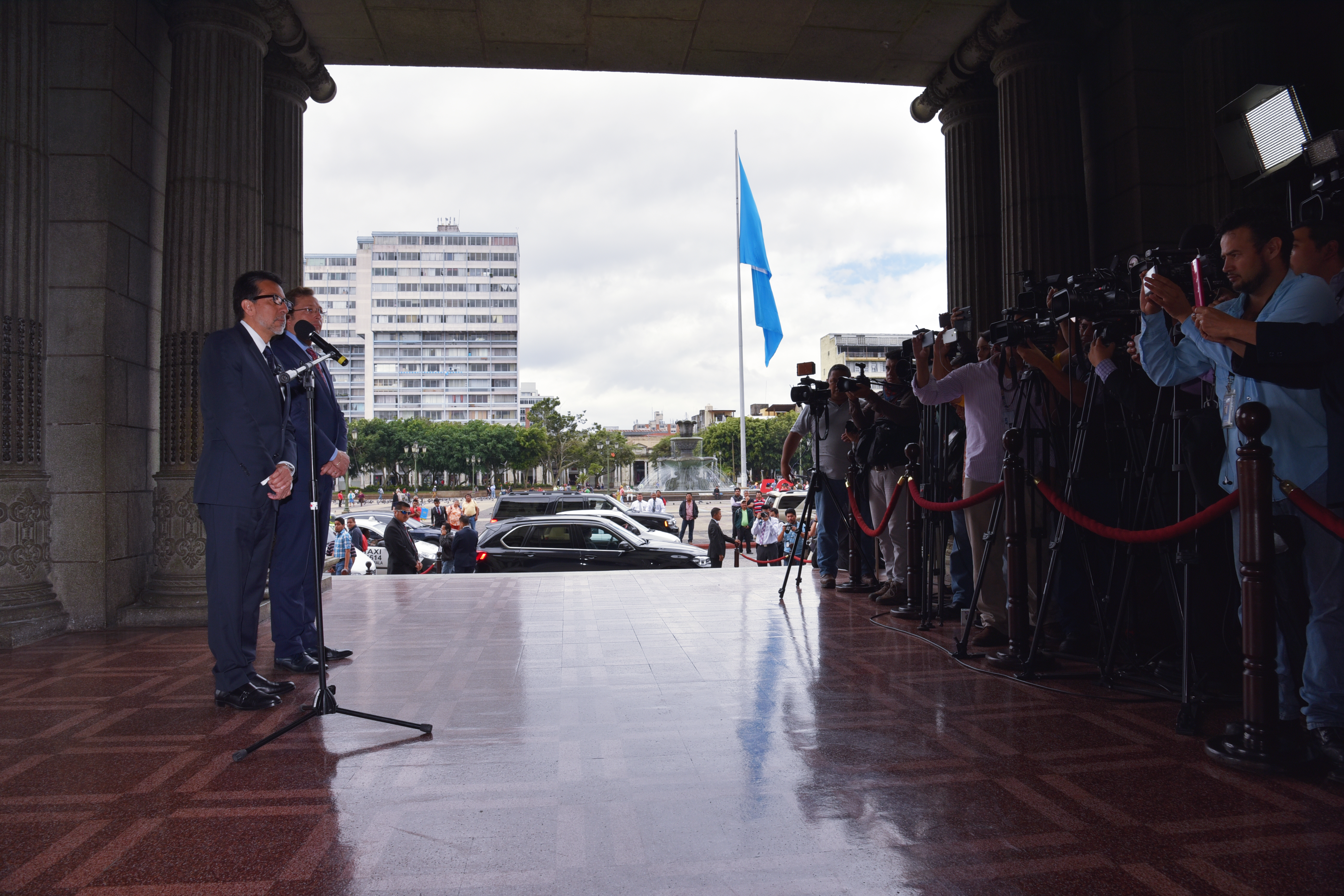
Heimann and the United States Ambassador to Guatemala Luis E. Arreaga in 2017

Political offices
Preceded by Alejandro Palmieri	Presidential Spokesperson; 2016–2018	Succeeded by Layla Lemus
