= Lucrecia Hernández Mack =

Guatemalan politician (1973–2023)

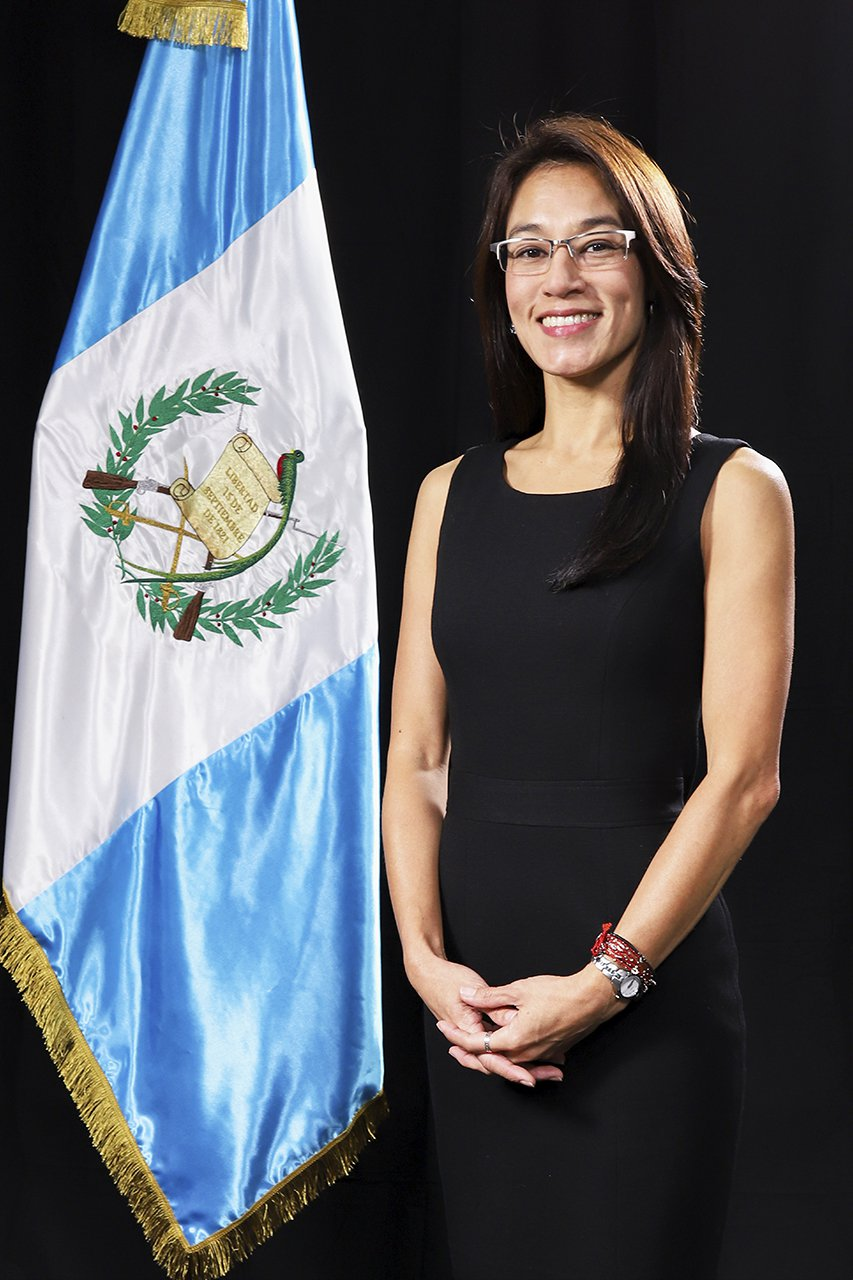
- Official portrait, 2020

Minister of Public Health and Social Assistance
- In office 1 August 2016 – 27 August 2017
- President: Jimmy Morales
- Preceded by: José Alfonso Cabrera
- Succeeded by: Carlos Soto Menegazzo

Deputy of the Congress of Guatemala
- In office 14 January 2020 – 6 September 2023
- Constituency: National List

Personal details
- Born: 16 November 1973 Guatemala City, Guatemala
- Died: 6 September 2023 (aged 49)
- Party: Semilla
- Children: 2
- Parent: Myrna Mack (mother)
- Education: Universidad de San Carlos de Guatemala

Lucrecia María Hernández Mack (16 November 1973 – 6 September 2023) was a Guatemalan physician and politician who served a deputy of the Congress from 2020 until her death in 2023. In July 2016, President Jimmy Morales nominated Hernández Mack as the minister of Public Health and Social Assistance, becoming the first woman to serve in that position. In 2017, she resigned from her position in protest over President Morales' order to expel United Nations anti-corruption investigator Iván Velásquez Gómez. A member of Movimiento Semilla, she served in the Congress after winning in the 2019 General Election.

== Biography ==
Hernández Mack studied medicine at the Universidad de San Carlos de Guatemala. She also obtained a master's degree in Public Health at Rafael Landívar University and a doctorate from Mexico's Metropolitan Autonomous University (UAM). After graduating, she worked as a consultant in several international organizations such as the Pan American Health Organization and the World Health Organization.

In 2015, she was actively involved in the protests that led to the resignation of President Otto Pérez Molina.

On 27 July 2016, President Jimmy Morales appointed Hernández Mack to replace Alfonso Cabrera as Minister of Public Health. Cabrera had announced his stepping down the week before, citing personal and health reasons, after being in office for only several months. She became the first woman to head Guatemala's health ministry. Soon afterwards, many problems in the ministry, including misallocation of funds, over-spending and other irregularities indicating rampant corruption, led her to file a number of complaints with both the Attorney General and the International Commission Against Impunity in Guatemala (CICIG).

She resigned on 27 August 2017 in response to the president's call for the expulsion of Iván Velásquez Gómez, the head of CICIG. She accused President Morales of being in favor of "impunity". Three vice-ministers, Adrián Chávez, Juan Carlos Verdugo Urrejola, and Édgar Rolando González Barreno, resigned with her.

Hernández Mack was among the founders of the progressive political party Movimiento Semilla, whose presidential candidate, Bernardo Arévalo, won the 2023 elections.

In 2019 she was elected to Congress for a four-year term as a member of Movimiento Semilla; during her time as a congresswoman she sponsored several pieces of legislation in the health sector. She declined to stand for re-election in 2023 for health reasons.

== Personal life and death ==
Born on 16 November 1973, Lucrecia Hernández Mack was the daughter of anthropologist Myrna Mack, who was assassinated in 1990 by a military death squad because of her criticism of the Guatemalan government's treatment of internally displaced persons, particularly the indigenous Maya peoples. Her murder later led to a case before the Inter-American Court of Human Rights, through which her family received compensation from the state.

Lucrecia Hernández Mack had two sons. She died of ovarian cancer on 6 September 2023, at the age of 49.

== Publications ==
- Transformando el sistema público de salud desde el primer nivel de atención. (2012). Lucrecia Hernández Mack, César Sánchez, Juan Carlos Verdugo, Lidia Morales, Carmen Alicia Arriaga, Zully Hernández. Instituto de Salud Incluyente and Médicos Mundi Navarra.

== See also ==
- Helen Mack Chang, her aunt
