= Ronaldo Cecilio Leiva =

Guatemalan politician

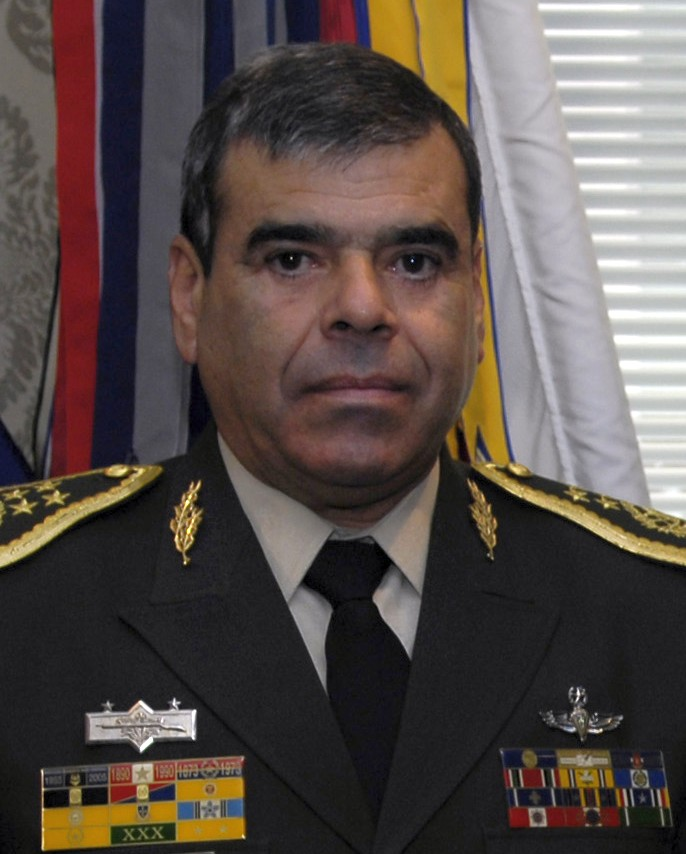
Ronaldo Cecilio Leiva at the Pentagon in 2007

Maj. Gen. Ronaldo Cecilio Leiva Rodríguez is a Guatemalan military officer, who served as the Minister of Defence from 29 December 2006 to 14 January 2008.
