= Alberto Fuentes Mohr =

Guatemalan economist and politician (1927–1979)

- Born: 22 November 1927; Quetzaltenango, Guatemala
- Died: 25 January 1979 (aged 51); Guatemala City, Guatemala
- Cause of death: Ballistic trauma
- Occupations: Economist and politician
- Known for: Assassinated

Alberto Fuentes Mohr (born 22 November 1927 – 25 January 1979) was a Guatemalan economist and politician, one of the founders of the Social Democratic Party. He also served as Minister of Finance and foreign minister during the 1960s.

== Biography ==
Alberto Fuentes Mohr was born in Quetzaltenango on 22 November 1927 as the son Dr. Alberto Fuentes Castillo and Maria Luisa Mohr. His father was the mayor of Quetzaltenango and a member of the Revolutionary Action Party. He was also the owner of the Farmacia Fuentes. His mother was the daughter of Guillaume Mohr Laurent, who emigrated from the Alsace province in France in the last quarter of the XVII century and one of the pioneers in the cultivation of coffee on the Pacific Coast of Guatemala with well-known farms such as San Juan Bautista and San Isidro Piedra Parada.

Alberto Fuentes Mohr followed his primary education in France and Morocco, and his secondary education at the Instituto Nacional de Varones del Occidente (INVO). He earned a scholarship from the Bank of Guatemala to study economics at the McGill University in Canada, and then earned a doctorate in economy at the London School of Economics. On his return to Guatemala, he started to work for the Bank of Guatemala.

From 1956 to 1957, he worked for the department of the United Nations Trusteeship Council. From 1957 to 1958, he headed the Mexico-based branch of the United Nations Economic Commission for Latin America and the Caribbean. In 1962, he was nominated as a member of the executive committee of the Latin-American Institute of Economic and Social Planification.

In 1966, Alberto Fuentes Mohr was appointed Minister of Finance (Ministro de Hacienda y Crédito Público) in the government of Julio César Méndez Montenegro. However, his reformist financial policies, including a controversial fiscal reform, resulted in his transfer from the ministry of finance to the ministry of foreign affairs. On 27 February 1970, while serving as Guatemala's minister of foreign affairs, Fuentes Mohr was briefly kidnapped by an urban guerrilla commando of the FAR, but was released just before election day after the government released FAR rebel Vicente Girón Calvillo from prison.

In November 1970, Fuentes Mohr was detained by the government of Colonel Carlos Manuel Arana Osorio and forced into exile. From 1970 to 1974, he taught at the National University of Costa Rica.

In 1974, Fuentes Mohr returned to Guatemala and ran as a candidate for the vice-presidency for the Frente Nacional de Oposición in the 1974 elections. Having been elected has a member of congress for Quetzaltenango, he started the preparations for the foundation of the Social Democratic party (PSD).

Alberto Fuentes Mohr was assassinated on 25 January 1979, shot by a caliber 45 in his car on his way from the Congress to his home, in an attack that lasted 32 seconds. Former Guatemala City mayor and leading opposition politician Manuel Colom was also assassinated. Those were times of political repression by the right-wing military dominated government during the regime of General Romeo Lucas (president from 1978 until he was overthrown in 1982 by another right-wing faction of the military).

== Published works ==
- Secuestro y prisión: dos caras de la violencia en Guatemala. Editorial Universitaria Centroamericana. 1971.
- Impuestos sobre los intermediarios financieros y sus operaciones. Organización de Estados Americanos, Oficina de Finanzas Públicas in San José, Costa Rica. 1973
- La creación de un mercado común: apúntes históricos sobre la experiencia de Centroamérica. Instituto para la Integración de América Latina, Buenos Aires. 1973.

== Prizes ==
- 1957: Commander in the Order of the Quetzal, in recognition for his efforts to promote the development of the Latin American Economic integration, and the Central American Common Market in particular.

== See also ==
- List of kidnappings
- Lists of solved missing person cases
