= Ricardo Quiñónez Lemus =

Guatemalan politician

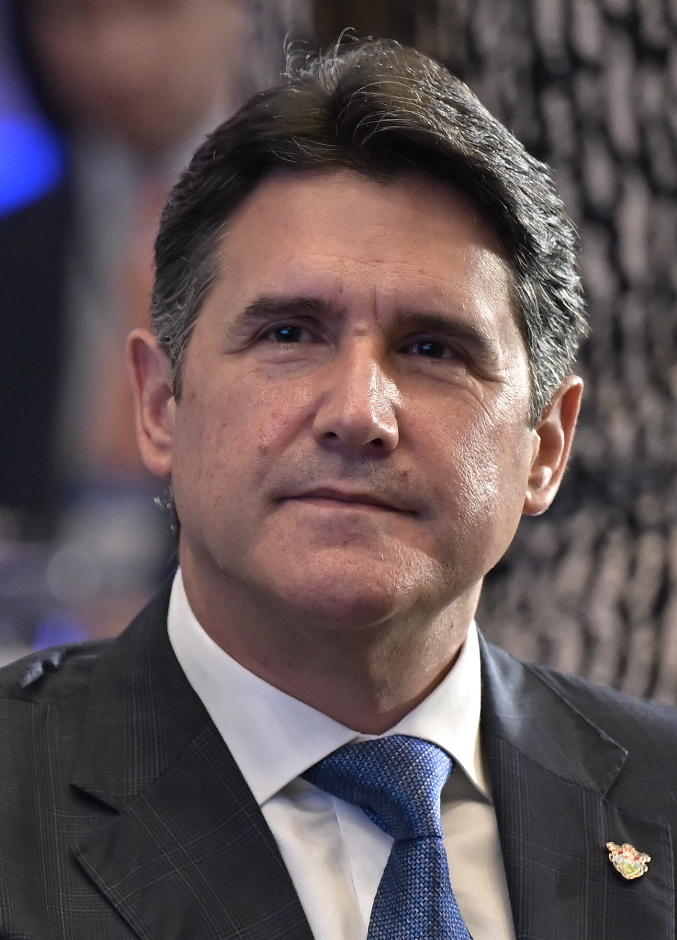
- Quiñónez in 2024

Mayor of Guatemala City
- Incumbent
- Assumed office 30 April 2018
- Deputy: Víctor Martínez Ruiz
- Preceded by: Álvaro Arzú

First Councillor of Guatemala City
- In office 15 January 2008 – 30 April 2018
- Mayor: Álvaro Arzú
- Preceded by: Enrique Godoy García-Granados
- Succeeded by: Víctor Martínez Ruiz

Personal details
- Born: 5 January 1965 (age 61) Guatemala City, Guatemala
- Party: Unionist Party
- Spouse: Dominique Denise Marie Wilson

Ricardo Quiñónez Lemus (locally [ri'kaɾdo ki'ɲones 'lemus]; born 5 January 1965) is a Guatemalan politician who has been serving as mayor of Guatemala City since 30 April 2018, after the death of Álvaro Arzú. Previously he served as first-councilor (deputy mayor) of the municipality from 2008 until 2018.

== Early life and education ==
Ricardo Quiñónez is son of María Magdalena Lemus Aguilar and the lawyer Ricardo Alfonso Quiñónez Sandoval, who was a representative of Pan American airlines. He has three siblings, Alfonso José, María Gabriela del Rosario, and Carmen Lucía. His grandfather and namesake was Interior and Foreign Minister during the government of Carlos Castillo Armas. His family and connections have been historically right wing.

Quiñónez has a bachelor's degree in Business Administration from the Monterrey Institute of Technology and Higher Education (Tecnológico de Monterrey—TEC) in Mexico. He obtained a Business Administration Master Degree in Marketing from the University of Bridgeport.

== Career ==
Quiñónez started his career as an executive in the airlines Aviateca and TACA in 1990. He has been a technology and consultancy entrepreneur and a member of the board of directors of the Guatemalan Managers Association. He participated in different capacities in various organizations, like the University del Itsmo, the Integral Development Foundation and the Rotary Club.

During Alvaro Arzú's presidency, he was in charge of the Presidential Commission for the National Geographic Information System, where he led the transition of the National Geographic Institute from Army control to civilian authorities. He designed the management strategy of the external resources that supported the peace process and was coordinator of consultive groups for its consolidation. In addition, he was secretary of the cabinet in its reconstruction efforts of the country after tropical storm Mitch and was general secretary of economic planning until the end of the presidential term in 2000.

Quiñónez founded the Unionist Party (Partido Unionista). In the 2003 general election, he was elected first-syndic of the Municipality of Guatemala and in the two subsequent elections, first-councillor. Due to the death of Álvaro Arzú, he replaced him as mayor on 30 April 2018 and won the elections of 16 June 2019 for said office for the period 2020-2024.

== Personal life ==
Ricardo Quiñonez married Dominique Denise Marie Wilson Arzú, known as Mercedes and as a figure in the Opus Dei movement. She is daughter of María Mercedes Arzú Irigoyen—sister of former president Alvaro Arzú— and Henry Hugh Wilson, a British oil consultant. Quiñónez and his wife have four children.

Political offices
| Preceded by Álvaro Arzú | Mayor of Guatemala City; 2018–present | Incumbent |
| Preceded by Gustavo Blanco Segura | First Councilor of Guatemala City; 2008–2018 | Succeeded by Enrique Godoy García-Granados |
