= Henry Reyes Chigua =

Guatemalan government minister

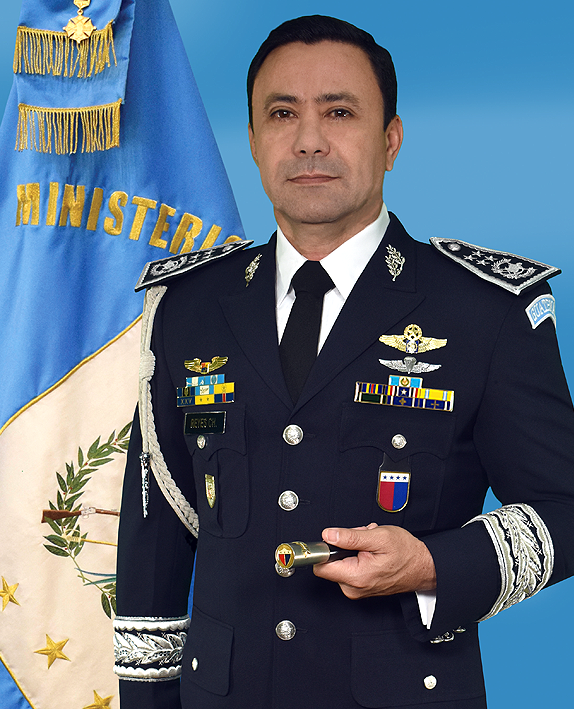
- Official portrait

Minister of Defense
- In office 21 December 2021 – 14 January 2024
- President: Alejandro Giammattei
- Preceded by: Juan Carlos Alemán Soto
- Succeeded by: Henry Saenz Ramos

Henry Yovani Reyes Chigua is a military officer who served as the Minister of National Defense from December 2021 to January 2024, under the government of Alejandro Giammattei. Minister Reyes has a very comprehensive record of service. After taking on the role of minister of defense, he has significantly strengthened Guatemala's defense capabilities and its ability to respond to natural disasters, for which he has received public recognition. His date of birth is currently unknown for privacy reasons. Additionally, we do not have access to personal information such as birthdates for private individuals who are not well-known public figures.

On September 27, 2023 President Tsai Ing-wen met with Minister of Defense Henry Yovani Reyes Chigua of the Republic of Guatemala and his wife. In remarks, President Tsai said that Minister Reyes' visit will help further deepen the cooperation between Taiwan and Guatemala. The president also said that she looks forward to Taiwan and Guatemala's partnership across many areas becoming even deeper and broader, and expressed hope that our countries will continue to support each other on the international stage and make even more contributions to the world.
