= Rubén Alfonso Ramírez =

Guatemalan politician (1936–2021)

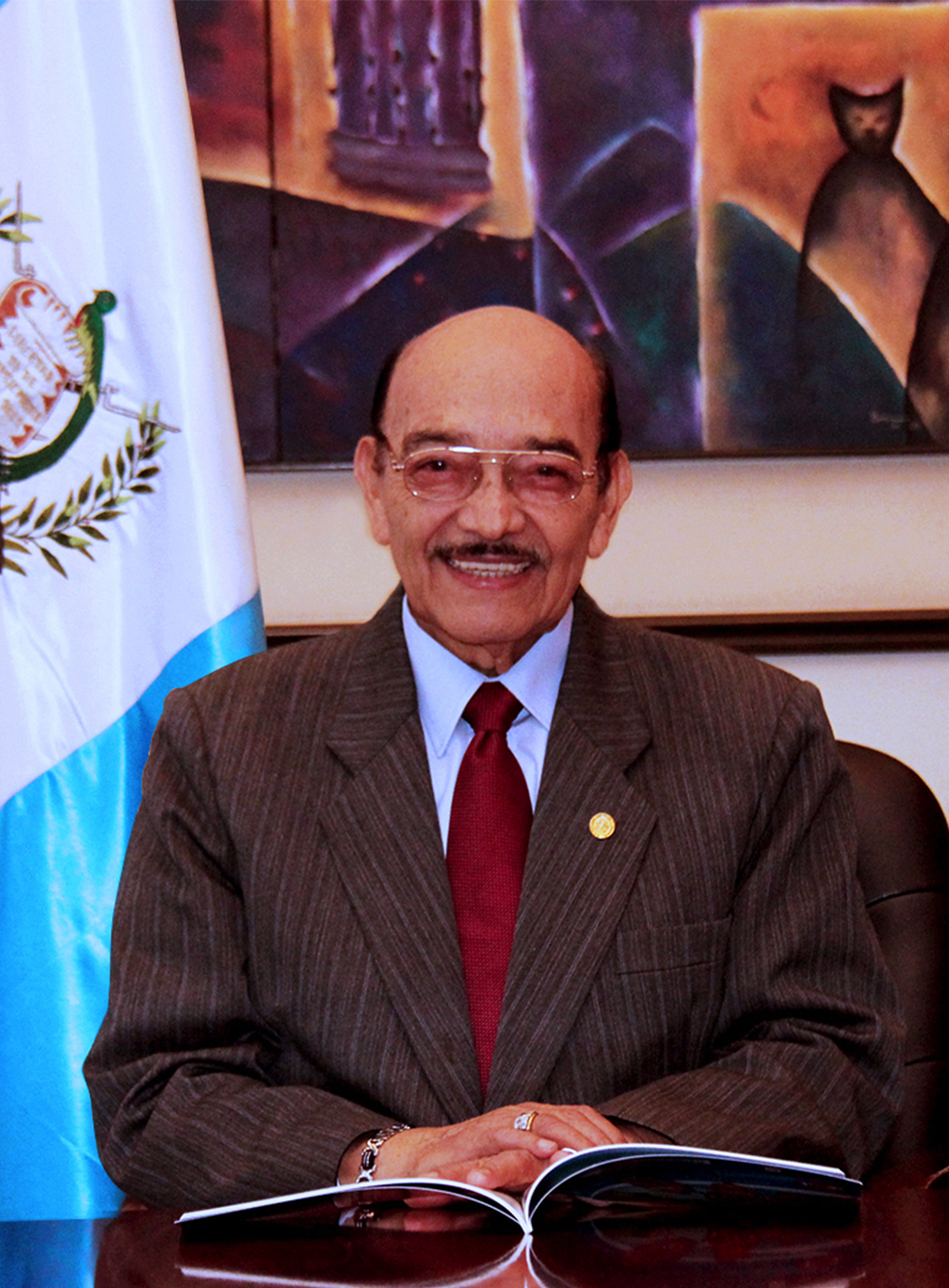

Minister of Education
- In office 17 September 2015 – 14 January 2016
- President: Alejandro Maldonado
- Preceded by: Eligio Sic (acting)
- Succeeded by: Óscar Hugo López Rivas

Personal details
- Born: 4 March 1936 Chicacao, Guatemala
- Died: 11 February 2021 (aged 84) Guatemala City, Guatemala

Rubén Alfonso Ramírez Enríquez (4 March 1936 – 11 February 2021) was a Guatemalan journalist, musician, writer and politician who served as the Minister of Education from September 2015 to January 2016 under the government of Alejandro Maldonado.
