= Williams Mansilla =

Guatemalan politician and general (born 1964)

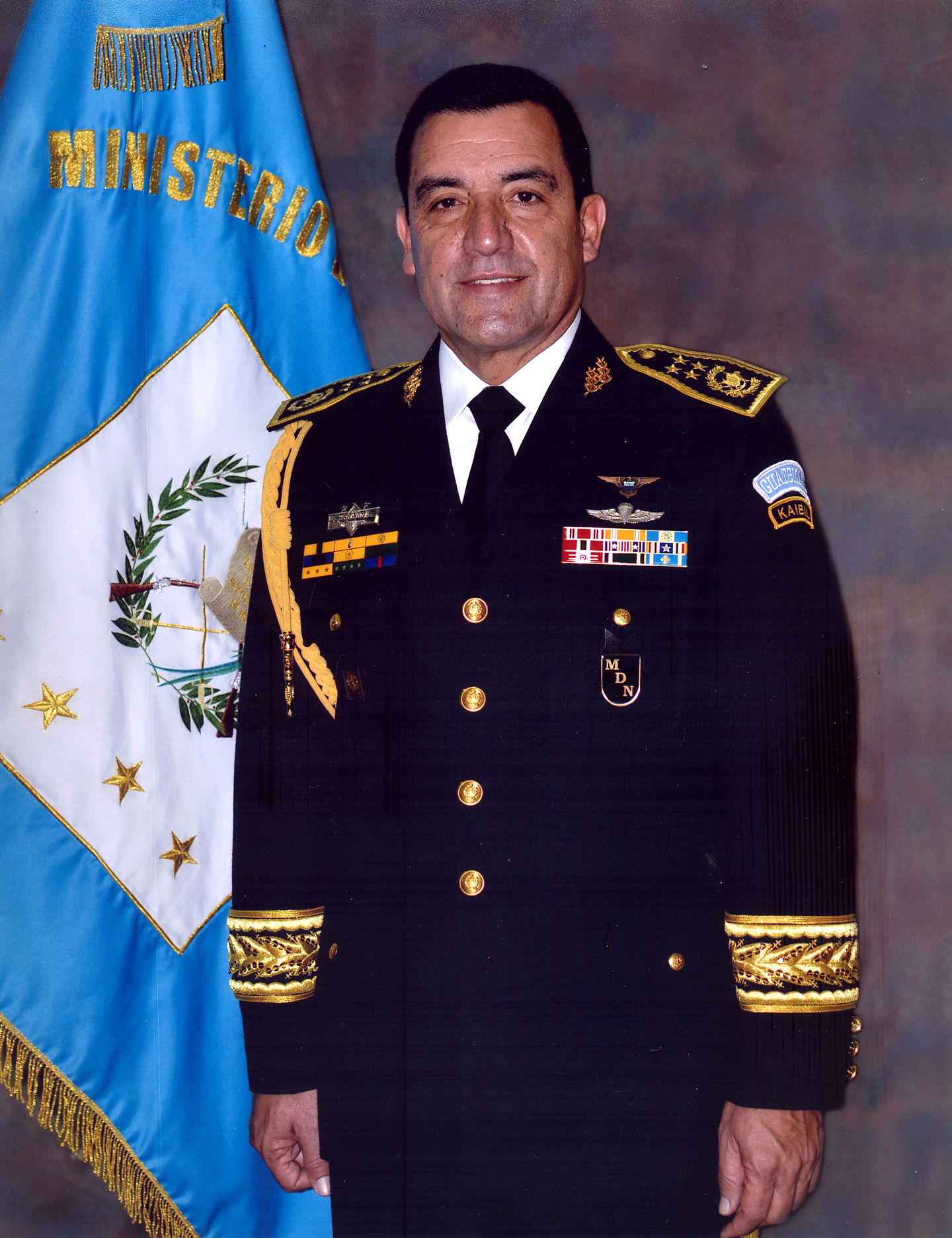
- Official portrait

44th Minister of Defence
- In office July 16, 2015 – October 1, 2017
- President: Jimmy Morales (2016-2017); Alejandro Maldonado (2015-2016); Otto Pérez Molina (2015)
- Preceded by: Augusto López Ambrosio
- Succeeded by: Luis Miguel Ralda Moreno

Personal details
- Born: Williams Agberto Mansilla Fernández; April 24, 1964 (age 62) Guatemala City, Guatemala
- Education: Escuela Politécnica de Guatemala
- Occupation: Military General

Williams Agberto Mansilla Fernández (born April 24, 1964, in Guatemala City) is a Guatemalan military officer who served as Minister of Defense from July 2015 until October 2017 during the presidencies of Otto Pérez Molina (2015), Alejandro Maldonado (2015–2016), and Jimmy Morales (2016–2017).

Mansilla was originally appointed Minister of Defense in 2015 by then President Otto Pérez Molina.

In September 2017, it was revealed that the Ministry of Defense, headed by Mansilla, had been paying President Jimmy Morales approximately $7,300 per month in addition to his regular presidential salary. The payments to Morales were called a "Bonus for Extraordinary Responsibility." Williams Mansilla resigned from office on October 1 shortly after the revelation. President Morales denied any wrongdoing, but returned about $60,000 to the Guatemalan government.

On January 26, 2018, Mansilla was arrested in connection with the bonus payments and charged with abuse of authority, illegal enrichment and embezzlement.
