= Julio Héctor Estrada =

Guatemalan politician and economist

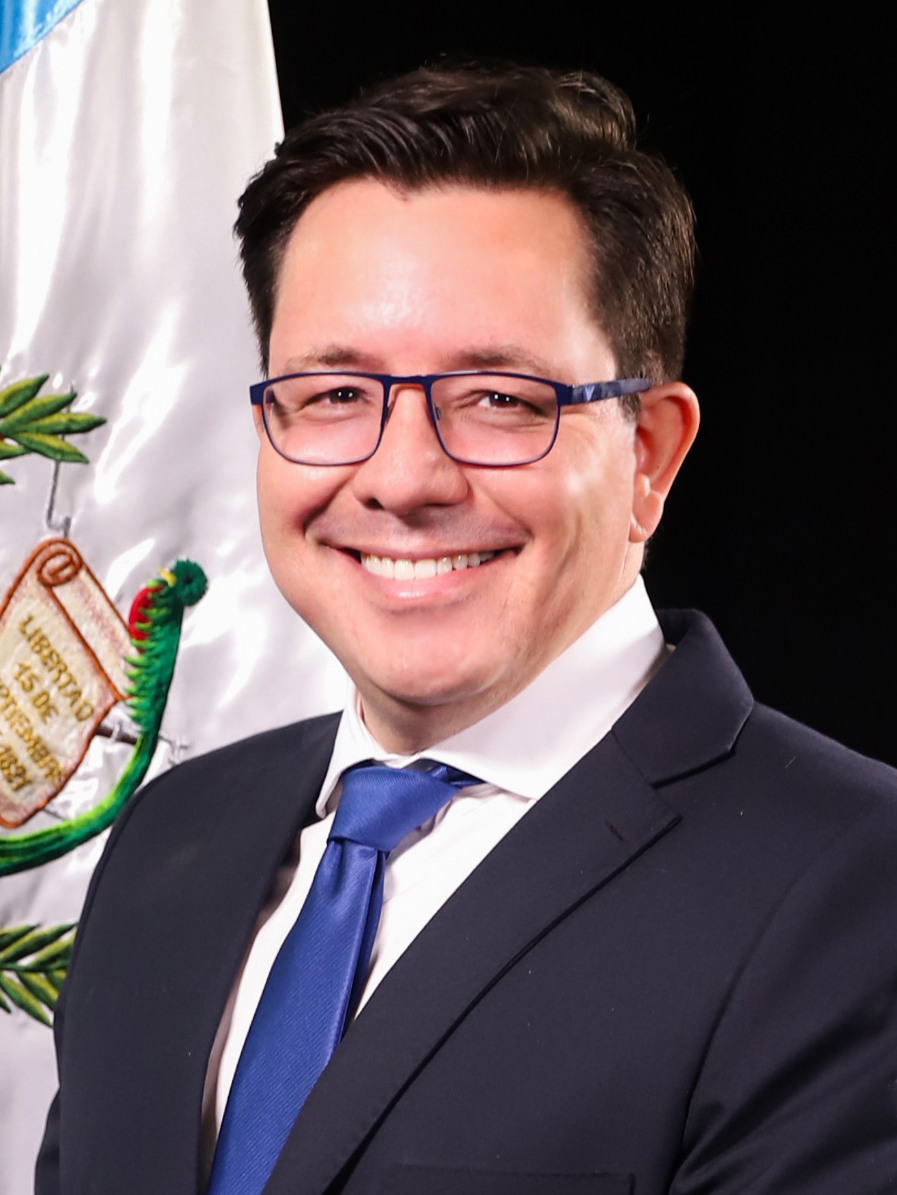
- Official portrait, 2024

Member of the Congress of Guatemala
- Incumbent
- Assumed office 14 January 2024
- Constituency: National List

Personal details
- Party: Cabal
- Other political affiliations: Commitment, Renewal and Order

Julio Héctor Estrada Domínguez (born 22 June 1974) is a Guatemalan politician and economist serving as a deputy of the Congress since January 2024. He served as Guatemala's Minister of Finance from 2016 until September 2018.
