= Ministry of National Defense (Guatemala) =

Government ministry of Guatemala

Ministry of National Defence
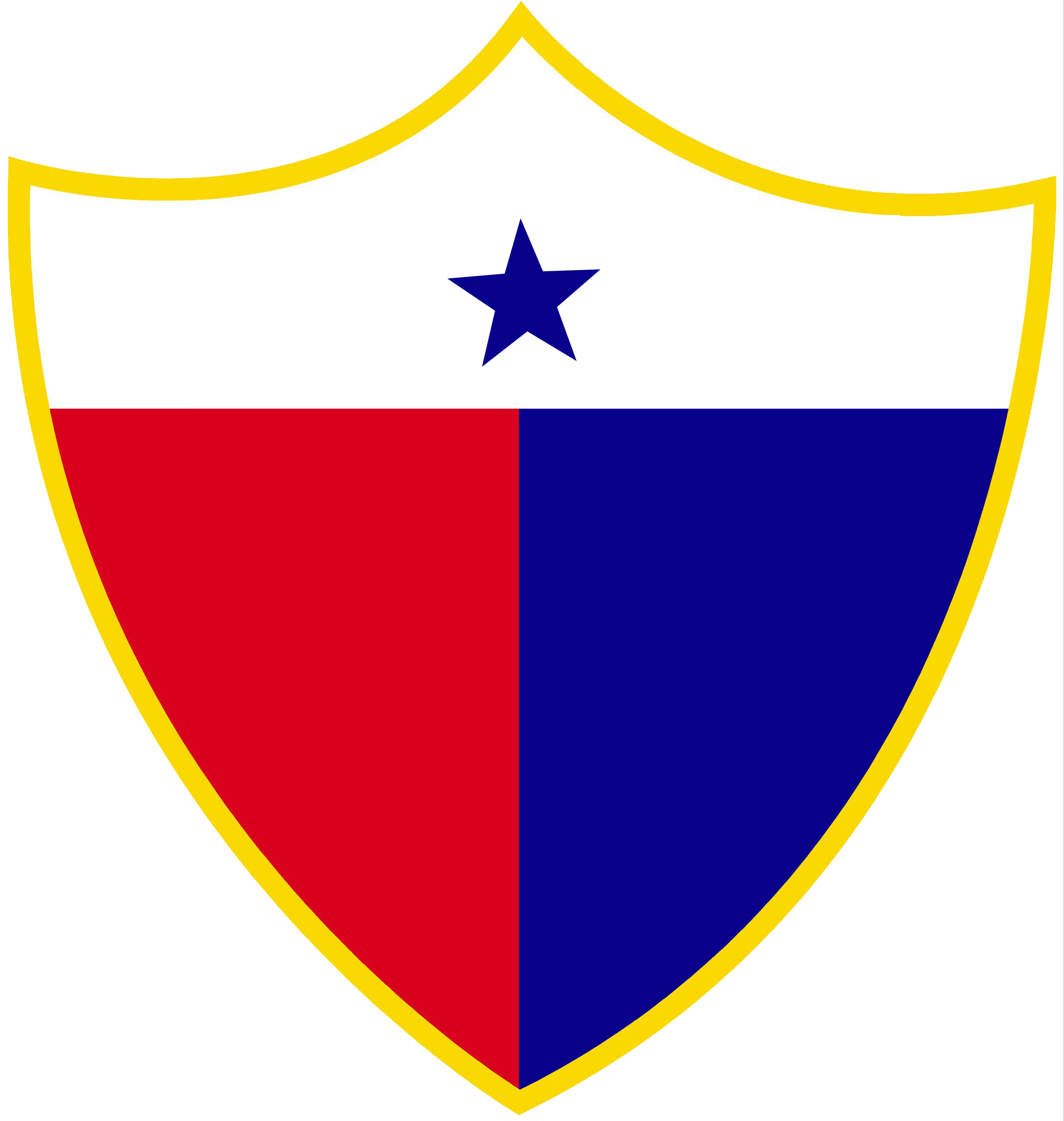
- Seal of the Minister of Defence

- Flag of the Minister of Defence

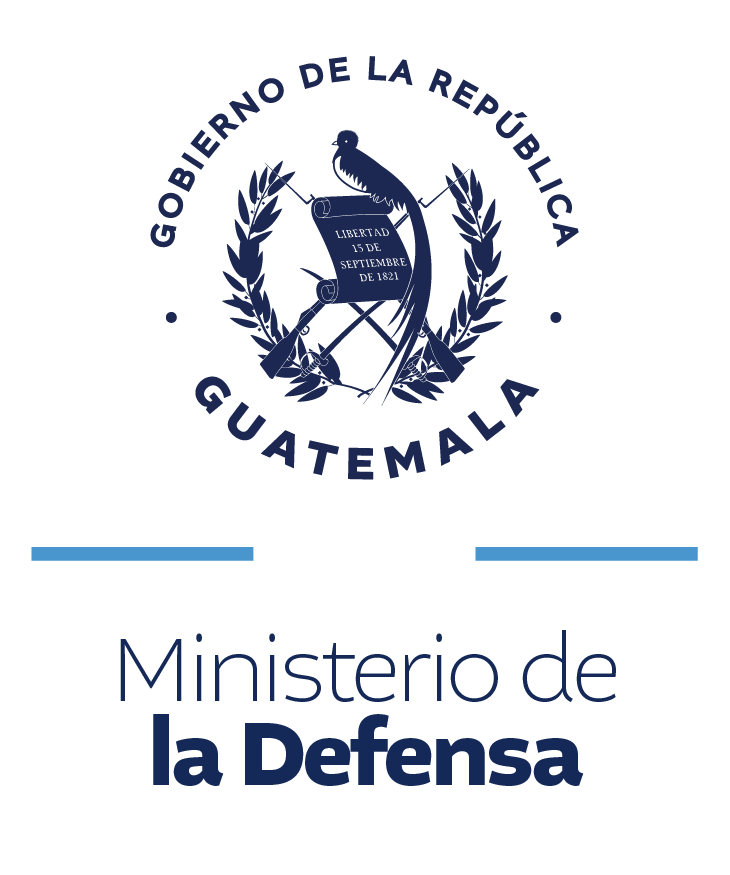
- Ministry logo

Agency overview
- Headquarters: Avenida La Reforma 1-45 zona 10, Guatemala City, Guatemala
- Minister responsible: Gen. Henry Saenz Ramos
- Website: www.mindef.mil.gt

The Ministry of National Defence (Spanish: Ministerio de la Defensa de la Nación) is the agency of the Guatemalan government responsible for the budget, training and policy of the military of Guatemala. Based in Guatemala City, the Defence Ministry is highly guarded, and the President of Guatemala frequently visits. Prior to 1945 the agency was titled the Secretariat of War (Secretaría de la Guerra).

As of 2024 the Minister of National Defence is Major General Henry Saenz Ramos.

== Structure ==
The ministry is headed by the Minister of National Defence, who reports to the President of Guatemala, the commander in chief of the armed forces.

Organisation chart of the Ministry of Defence

== List of ministers of national defence ==
Picture	Name	Term of office		President(s) served under
Picture	Name	Start	End	President(s) served under
	Col. Carlos Paz Tejada			Juan José Arévalo
Arbenz	Col. Jacobo Árbenz Guzmán	15 March 1945	15 March 1951	Juan José Arévalo
	Col. José Ángel Sánchez	1954	1954	Carlos Castillo Armas
	Col. Enrique Close De León	1955	1957	Carlos Castillo Armas
	Juán Francisco Oliva	1957	1957	Carlos Castillo Armas
	Col. Guillermo Flores Avendaño	3 March 1958	1958	Miguel Ydígoras Fuentes
	Rubén González Siguí	1960	1960	Miguel Ydígoras Fuentes
	Col. Alfredo Enrique Peralta Azurdia	1960	30 March 1963	Miguel Ydígoras Fuentes
	Col. Rafael Arriaga Bosque	1 July 1966	26 March 1968	Julio César Méndez Montenegro
	Rolando Chinchilla Aguilar	28 March 1968	19 February 1969	Julio César Méndez Montenegro
	Brig. Gen. Doroteo Reyes Santa Cruz	19 February 1969	after 1 April 1970	Julio César Méndez Montenegro
	Brig. Gen. Leonel Vassaux Martínez	before July 1970	after 1 January 1972	Julio César Méndez Montenegro
	Brig. Gen. Kjell Eugenio Laugerud García	January 1972	1974	Carlos Manuel Arana Osorio
	Brig. Gen. Fausto David Rubio Coronado	1974	after 1 April 1975	Carlos Manuel Arana Osorio
	Gen. Fernando Romeo Lucas García	1 July 1975	after 1 January 1977	Gen. Kjell Eugenio Laugerud García
	Gen. Otto Guillermo Spiegeler Noriega	1 February 1977	15 January 1980	Gen. Kjell Eugenio Laugerud García
	Gen. Ángel Aníbal Guevara Rodríguez	15 January 1980	9 August 1981	Gen. Fernando Romeo Lucas García
	Gen. Luís René Mendoza Palomo	1981	1981	Gen. Fernando Romeo Lucas García
	Brig. Gen. José Efraín Ríos Montt	1982	1982	Gen. Fernando Romeo Lucas García
	Gen. Óscar Humberto Mejía Víctores	1 September 1982	after 15 August 1985	Gen. José Efraín Ríos Montt
		8 August 1985	14 January 1986	Gen. Óscar Humberto Mejía Víctores
	Gen. Jaime Hernández Méndez	14 January 1986	31 January 1987	Vinicio Cerezo
	Gen. Héctor Alejandro Gramajo Morales	31 January 1987	21 May 1990	Vinicio Cerezo
	Gen. Juán Leonel Bolaños Chávez	21 May 1990	after 5 September 1990	Vinicio Cerezo
	Gen. Luis Enrique Mendoza García	14 January 1991	13 December 1991	Jorge Serrano Elías
	Gen. José Domingo García Samayoa	13 December 1991	7 June 1993	Jorge Serrano Elías; Ramiro de León Carpio
	Gen. Jorge Roberto Perussina Rivera	7 June 1993	28 June 1993	Ramiro de León Carpio
	Gen. Mario René Enríquez Morales	1 July 1993	9 October 1995	Ramiro de León Carpio
	Maj. Gen. Marco Antonio González Taracena	9 October 1995	13 January 1996	Ramiro de León Carpio
	Maj. Gen. Julio Arnoldo Balconi Turcios	14 January 1996	3 July 1997	Álvaro Arzú
	Brig. Gen. Héctor Mario Barrios Celada	3 July 1997	30 June 1999	Álvaro Arzú
	Gen. Marco Tulio Espinoza	30 June 1999	14 January 2000	Álvaro Arzú
	Col. Juan de Dios Estrada Velásquez	18 January 2000	9 January 2001	Alfonso Portillo
	Maj. Gen. Eduardo Arévalo Lacs	9 January 2001	12 December 2001	Alfonso Portillo
	Gen. Leonel Méndez Estrada	10 December 2001	26 August 2002	Alfonso Portillo
	Robin Malconi Moran Muñoz	26 August 2002	January 2004	Alfonso Portillo
	Brig. Gen. César Augusto Méndez Pinelo	January 2004	7 January 2005	Óscar Berger
Aldana	Maj. Gen. Carlos Humberto Aldana Villanueva	7 January 2005	2 November 2005	Óscar Berger
Bermúdez	Brig. Gen. Francisco Bermúdez Amado	2 November 2005	29 December 2006	Óscar Berger
Leiva	Maj. Gen. Ronaldo Cecilio Leiva Rodríguez	29 December 2006	14 January 2008	Óscar Berger
	Brig. Gen. Marco Tulio García Franco	15 January 2008	21 December 2008	Álvaro Colom
	Maj. Gen. Abraham Valenzuela Gonzalez	21 December 2008	September 2011	Álvaro Colom
	Maj. Gen. Juan José Ruiz Morales	September 2011	14 January 2012	Álvaro Colom
	Brig. Gen. Ulises Noé Anzueto Girón	14 January 2012	16 July 2013	Otto Pérez Molina
	Maj. Gen. Manuel Augusto López Ambrosio	16 July 2013	16 July 2015	Otto Pérez Molina
	Gen. Williams Agberto Mansilla Fernández	16 July 2015	1 October 2017	Otto Pérez Molina; Alejandro Maldonado; Jimmy Morales
	Gen. Luis Miguel Ralda Moreno	2 October 2017	19 December 2019	Jimmy Morales
	Gen. Albin Enrique Dubois Ramírez	19 December 2019	14 January 2020	Jimmy Morales
	Gen. Juan Carlos Alemán Soto	14 January 2020	21 December 2021	Alejandro Giammattei
	Gen. Henry Yovani Reyes Chigua	21 December 2021	14 January 2024	Alejandro Giammattei
	Gen. Henry Saenz Ramos	15 January 2024	Incumbent	Bernardo Arévalo

== See also ==
- Military of Guatemala

== Sources ==
- CIA Chiefs Of State
- New York Times archives
- National Security Archives - The Guatemalan Military
