= Ministry of Labor and Social Welfare (Guatemala) =

Government ministry of Guatemala

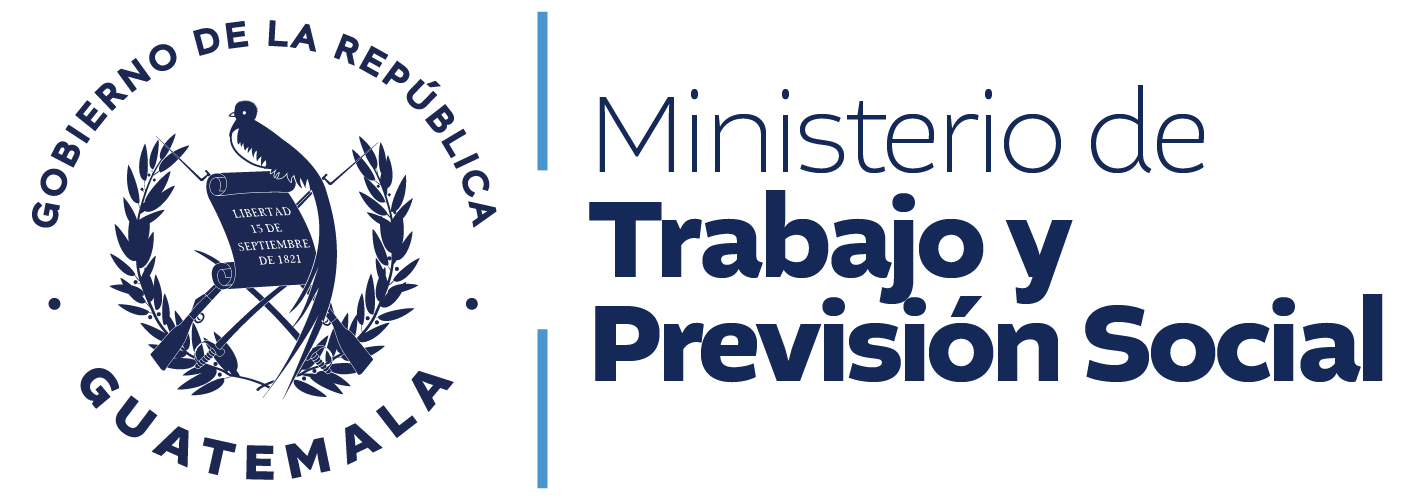
- Ministry logo

Ministry overview
- Formed: February 8, 1947; 79 years ago
- Jurisdiction: Guatemala
- Ministry executive: Miriam Roquel Chávez, Minister
- Website: mintrabajo.gob.gt

The Ministry of Labor and Social Welfare (Spanish: Ministerio de Trabajo y Previsión Social or MINTRABAJO) is a government ministry of Guatemala, headquartered in Zone 9 of Guatemala City. It is responsible for ensuring and promoting efficient and effective compliance with legislation, policies, and programs related to work and social security.

Miriam Roquel Chávez is the current Minister of Labor and Social Welfare.
