= Ministry of Public Health and Social Assistance =

Government institution in Guatemala

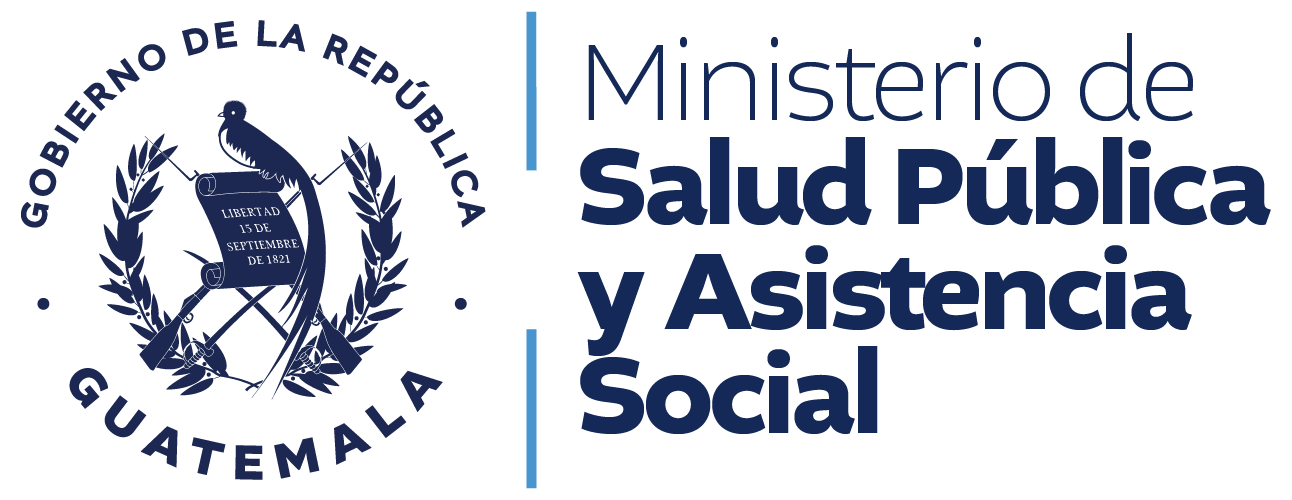
- Ministry logo

Ministry overview
- Formed: December 27, 1944; 81 years ago
- Jurisdiction: Guatemala
- Ministry executive: Francisco José Coma Martín, Minister
- Website: mspas.gob.gt

The Ministry of Public Health and Social Assistance (Spanish: Ministerio de Salud Pública y Asistencia Social or MSPAS) is a government ministry of Guatemala, headquartered in Zone 11 of Guatemala City. It is responsible for enforcing laws and policies relating to preventive and curative health and promoting the protection, recovery, and rehabilitation of the physical and mental health of the population. President Alejandro Giammattei named Francisco José Coma Martín as Minister of Public Health and Social Assistance on September 16, 2021.
