= Jimmy Morales =

2016–2020 Guatemalan president and former comic actor

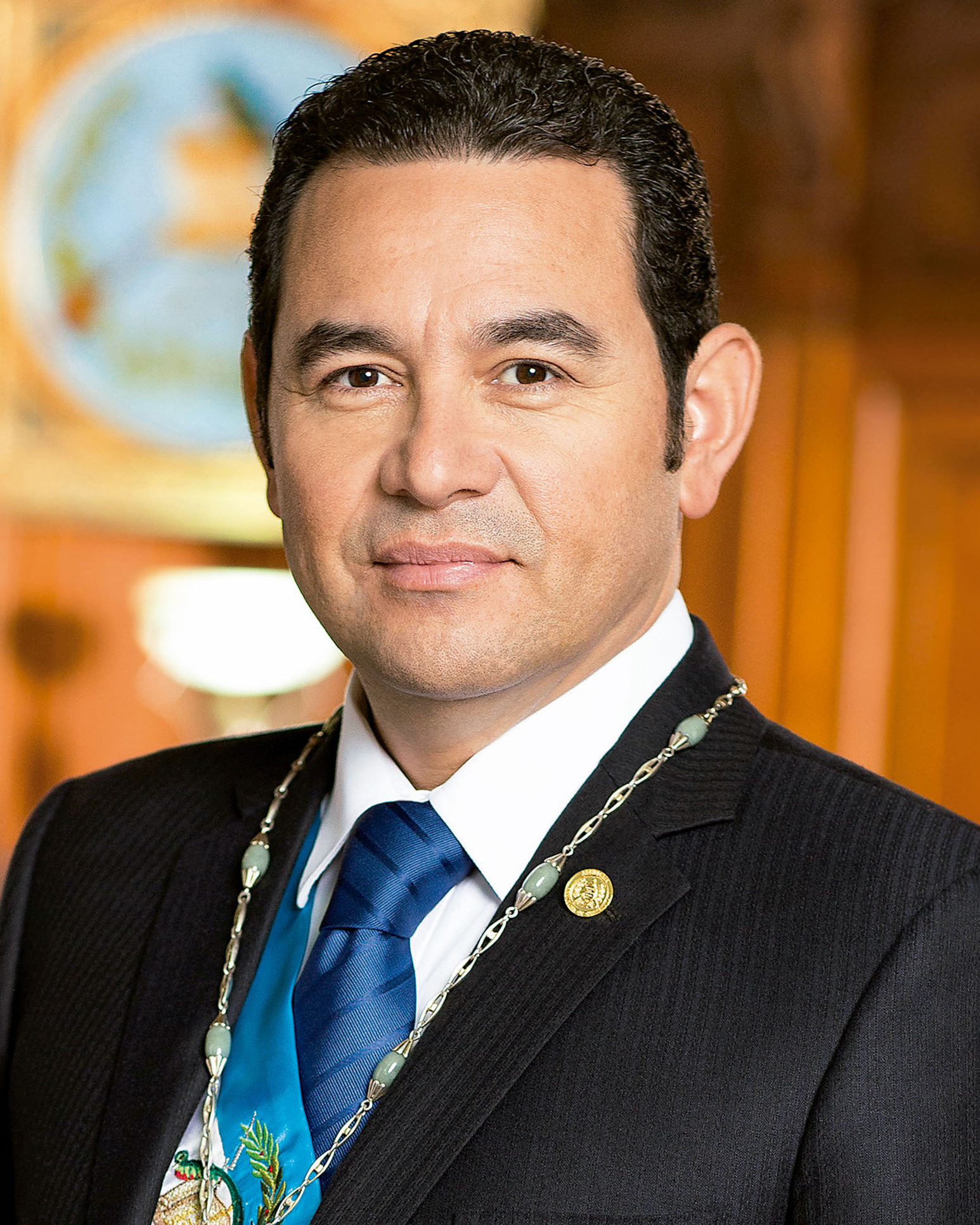
- Official portrait, 2016

50th President of Guatemala
- In office 14 January 2016 – 14 January 2020
- Vice President: Jafeth Cabrera
- Preceded by: Alejandro Maldonado
- Succeeded by: Alejandro Giammattei

2nd Secretary-General of the National Convergence Front
- In office 10 March 2013 – 11 January 2016
- Deputy: Édgar Ovalle Maldonado
- Preceded by: José Luis Quilo
- Succeeded by: Édgar Ovalle Maldonado (acting)

Personal details
- Born: James Ernesto Morales Cabrera; 18 March 1969 (age 57) Guatemala City, Guatemala
- Party: National Convergence Front
- Spouse: Patricia Marroquín (m. 1989)
- Children: 4
- Education: University of San Carlos of Guatemala
- Cabinet: Cabinet of Jimmy Morales
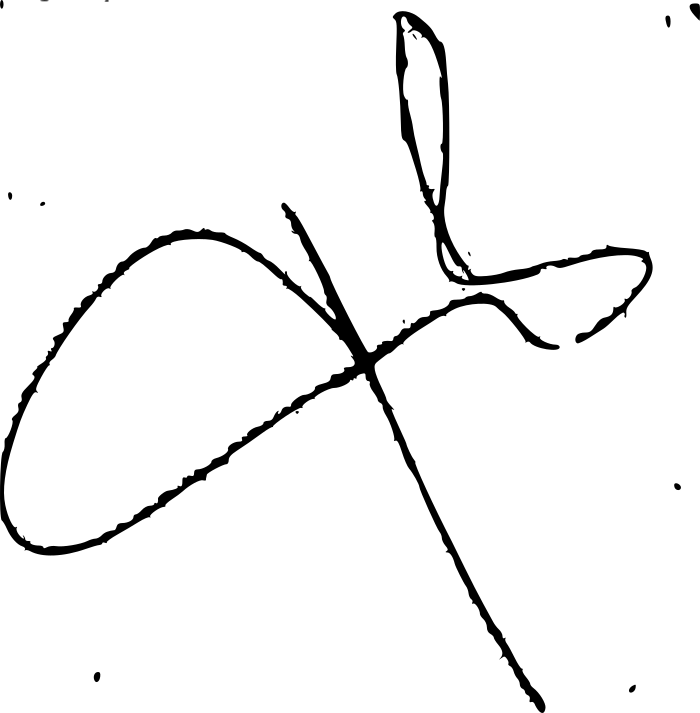
- Signature
- Website: Official website

James Ernesto Morales Cabrera (locally [ɟʝimi eɾˈnesto moˈɾales kaˈβɾeɾa]; born 18 March 1969) is a Guatemalan politician, actor, and comedian who served as the 50th president of Guatemala from 2016 to 2020.

== Early and personal life ==
Morales was born in Guatemala City to José Everardo Morales Orellana and Celita Ernestina Cabrera Acevedo. He comes from a circus family and is an Evangelical Christian. His father was killed in a car accident when he was three years old, prompting him, his mother and three siblings to move to his grandparents' house, where he grew up. By the time he was ten years old, he and his brother Sammy accompanied their grandfather to sell bananas and used-clothing at the market in Santa Lucia Milpas Altas.

He holds degrees in business administration and theology from the Universidad de San Carlos de Guatemala. Morales also holds a master's degree in strategic studies with a specialization in security and defense from Mariano Gálvez University. He furthered his studies in strategic studies at the Universidad de San Carlos de Guatemala.

Morales rose to fame as a TV comedian, starring in the series Moralejas ("Morals") alongside his brother Sammy. He formally changed his first name from James to Jimmy by deed poll in 2011.

Morales has been married for three decades to Patricia Marroquín, and has three children.

== Political career ==
In 2011, he ran as a mayoral candidate in Mixco in the Guatemala City suburbs for the small right-wing Action for National Development party. He placed third.

In 2013, Morales joined the small National Convergence Front (FCN/Nation) and became its Secretary-General.

=== 2015 presidential campaign ===
In 2015, Morales was nominated as the FCN's presidential candidate. His priorities were fighting corruption and dealing with chronic malnutrition, low education levels, and insecurity. His slogan was "Neither corrupt, nor a thief" (Ni corrupto, ni ladrón). He ran on a platform of conservative values and against corruption. He identifies as a nationalist, supports the death penalty, opposes abortion and legalized drugs, and denies that a genocide against the Ixil Maya took place.

He was initially considered an outsider but surprisingly led the field in the first round of the election, qualifying for a runoff alongside former First Lady Sandra Torres. Morales' success came after both former vice president Roxana Baldetti and outgoing president Otto Pérez Molina had to step down and were arrested on fraud and corruption charges (the La Línea corruption case).

In the runoff, Morales defeated Torres in a landslide, taking 67.4 percent of the vote. Morales' success was viewed as a sign of the distrust of many Guatemalans towards the traditional political elite that ruled the country for decades. Voter anger and military support helped him win the presidency against more experienced politicians whom voters felt were tainted by a corrupt political system.

== Presidency (2016–2020) ==
=== Inauguration and first days ===
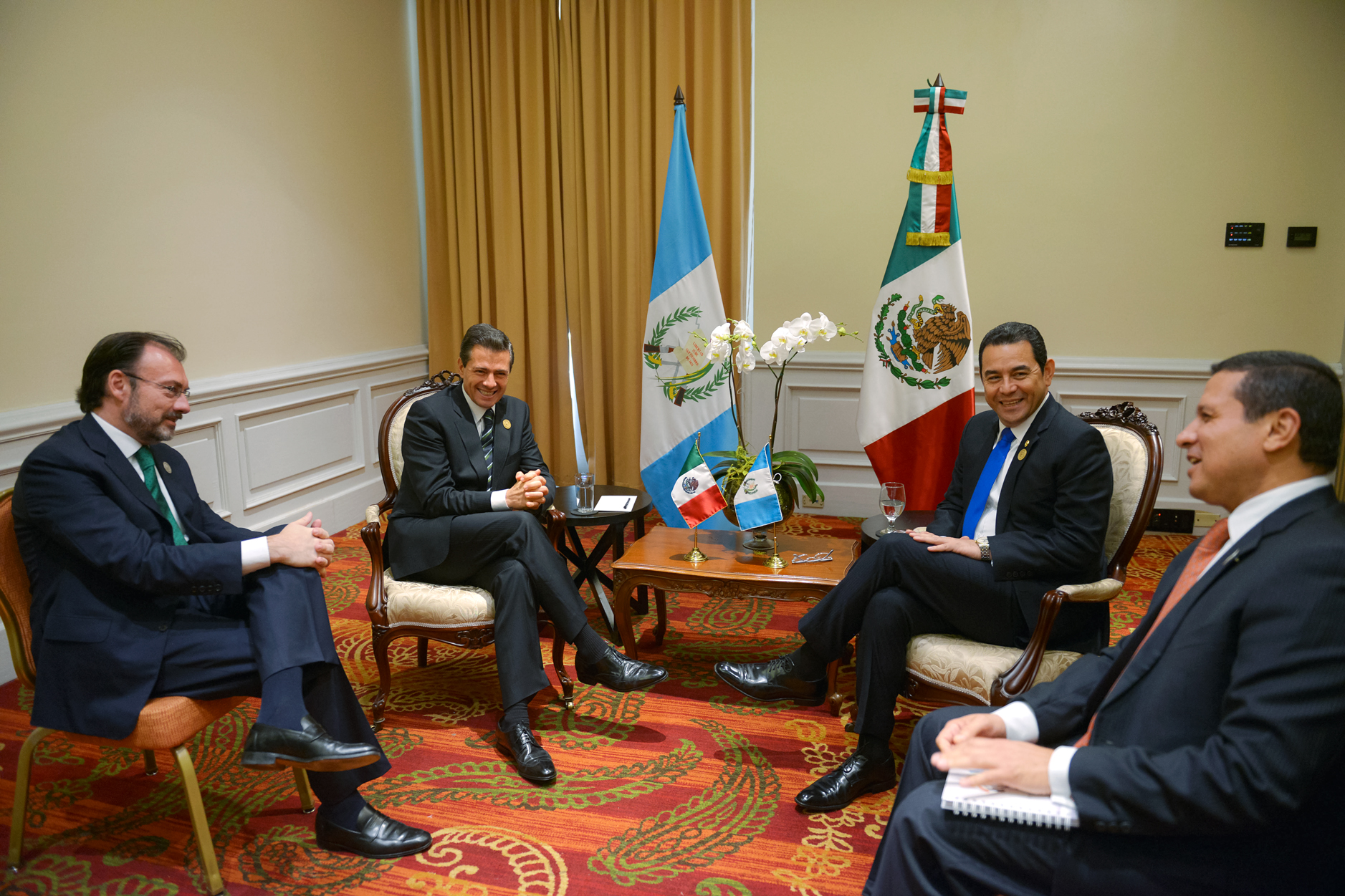
Morales with President of Mexico Enrique Peña Nieto

Morales was sworn into office as the 50th president of Guatemala on 14 January 2016. The first words of his inaugural address were, "Thank you, my God, for the privilege you have given me to serve my country and my people." According to analysts, he took a messianic route and made everyone present at the inauguration swear to commit to a 'new' Guatemala.

During the first days of the new administration, a request for a preliminary trial was introduced against the newly appointed Minister of Communications, Infrastructure, and Housing, Sherry Ordóñez, because she was a state contractor. Ordóñez and Morales, for their part, denied that there was a constitutional restriction for her to continue as Minister. However, on 25 January, eleven days after being sworn in, Ordóñez would resign from her post.

=== Foreign policy ===
Morales' first international visit was to Ecuador, where he participated in CELAC and maintained bilateral relations with the presidents of Chile, Venezuela, Bolivia, Mexico, Ecuador, and Argentina.

On 24 December 2017, Morales announced that he planned to move the Guatemalan embassy in Israel from Tel Aviv to Jerusalem. He became the second national leader to announce a decision to make such a move, after the President of the United States, Donald Trump, made a similar announcement on 6 December.

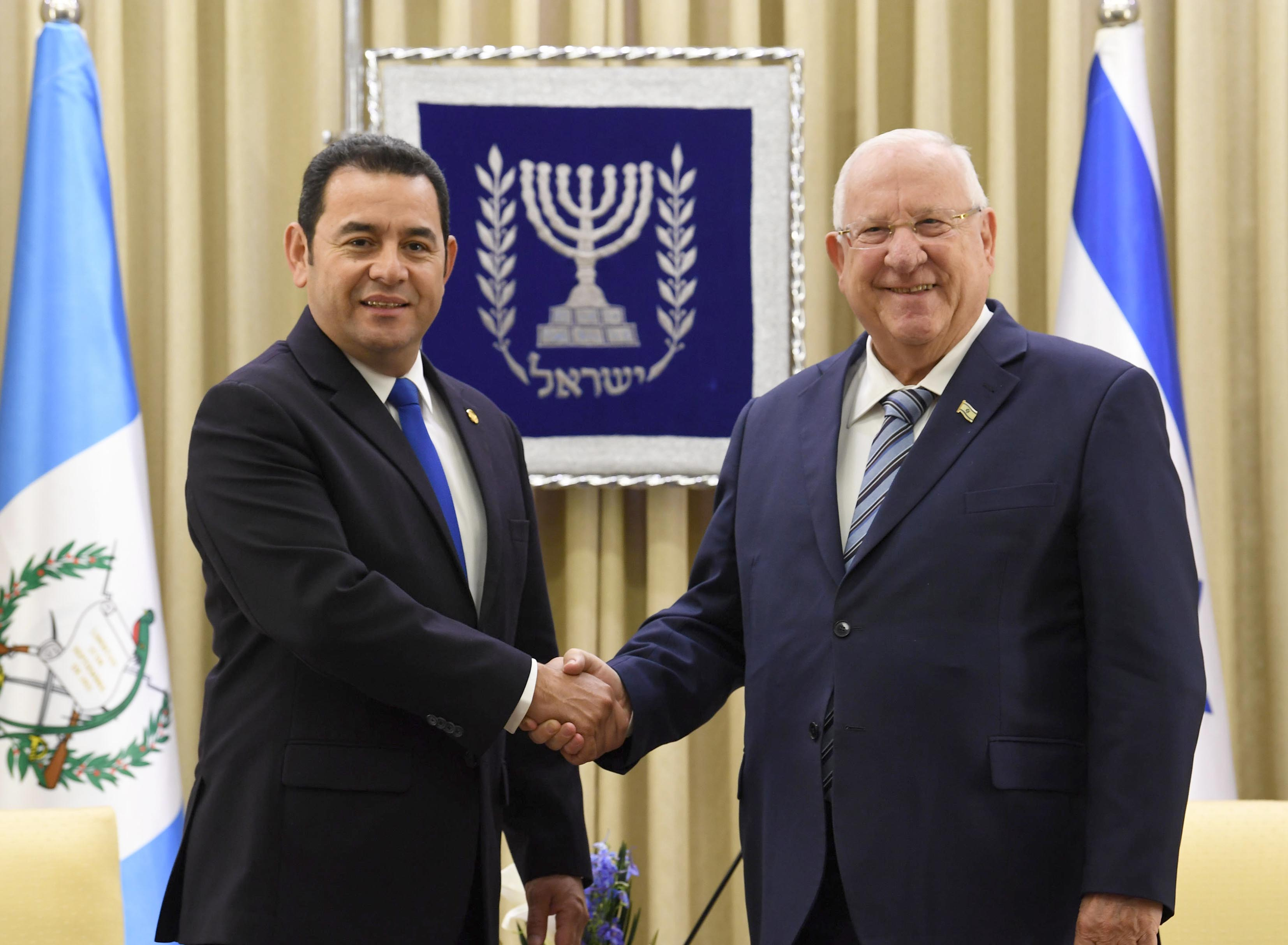
Morales with President of Israel Reuven Rivlin

On 18 June 2018, the Morales government was widely criticized for its slow action in favor of Guatemalans affected by the American policy of separating immigrant families; this caused the dismissal of the presidential spokesman Heinz Heimann, who, a day before his removal from the office, said that the government respected the policy of President Trump.

== Controversies ==
=== Arrest of relatives ===
In January 2017, Morales' older brother and close adviser, Samuel "Sammy" Morales, as well as one of Morales' sons, José Manuel Morales, were arrested on corruption and money laundering charges. According to media reports, the arrests prompted several large protests of up to 15,000 people demanding President Morales' resignation. The most recent took place in September 2017. Morales refused to step down. The charges were dismissed shortly after, and they were later cleared of fraud charges by a Guatemalan court on 19 August 2019.

=== CICIG and illegal donations ===
In August 2017, Morales ordered the expulsion of Colombian Iván Velásquez, commissioner of the International Commission Against Impunity in Guatemala (CICIG), after it began "investigating claims that his party took illegal donations, including from drug-traffickers" and asked Congress to "strip him of immunity from prosecution." The Constitutional Court of Guatemala blocked the move. Minister of Foreign Affairs Carlos Raúl Morales had refused to sign the executive order and was removed from office along with Vice-minister Carlos Ramiro Martínez, and vice-minister Anamaría Diéguez resigned. Velásquez confirmed he will continue as CICIG commissioner following the Constitutional Court decision to block his expulsion. In September 2017, the Congress of Guatemala refused to strip Morales of his immunity, rejecting Commissioner Velásquez's suggestion. On 7 August 2022, the first leftist President of Colombia, Gustavo Petro, appointed Velasquez as Minister of National Defense of Colombia.

=== Responsibility bonus ===
In September 2017, it was revealed that the Ministry of Defense, headed by Williams Mansilla, had been paying President Morales a $7,300 per month bonus since December 2016, in addition to his regular salary. The payments from the defense ministry were referred to as a "Bonus for Extraordinary Responsibility." Mansilla resigned from office soon after the payments were revealed to the public. He was later arrested and charged with corruption in January 2018, relating to the special bonus to Morales. President Morales denied the bonuses were illegal but did return approximately $60,000 to the government.

=== Expenses ===
The acquisition of services and luxury items for the president using public monies by the government caused controversy, although he indicated not being personally involved in those expenses.

=== Sexual abuse accusations ===
A former cabinet minister accused Morales of having sexually abused young female public workers with the complicity of other government officials.

=== Belize mobilization ===
Guatemalan Defense Minister Williams Mansilla confirmed on 22 April 2016 the deployment of 3,000 soldiers to the Guatemalan border with Belize after a shooting incident on Belizean territory with army weapons resulted in the death of a 13-year-old boy and the wounding of his 11-year-old brother, as well as their 48-year-old father.

=== Calls for prosecution ===
On 14 January 2020, Guatemalan civil society groups began pressuring Guatemalan authorities to arrest Morales for corruption after he left office. However, he regained immunity from prosecution after it was agreed that other officials who served in his administration would be stripped of their immunity. Eight of his allies, including some who were not in his administration, were charged with corruption, including two former FCN legislators and 2019 FCN presidential candidate Estuardo Galdámez.

== Post-presidency ==
In 2023, Morales announced his candidacy for deputy to the Congress for the 2023 general election, while his brother Sammy Morales announced his presidential candidacy, both representing the National Convergence Front (FCN). However, neither received sufficient votes to get elected. As a result, the Supreme Electoral Tribunal dissolved the FCN.

== Honors ==
- (Taiwan) Order of Brilliant Jade, Grand Cordon, awarded by the President of the Republic of China Tsai Ing-wen on 11 January 2017.
- (Israel) Honorary doctorate, awarded by Hebrew University of Jerusalem, in November 2016.

== Filmography ==
=== Films ===
- Manzana Güena en Noche Güena (2004)
- La Misteriosa Herencia (2004)
- Detectives por Error (2005)
- Ve Que Vivos, una aventura en el más allá (2006)
- Un Presidente de a Sombrero (2007)
- Repechaje (2009)
- Gerardi (2010)
- Fe (2011)
- Viva la Crisis (2012)

=== Television ===
- Aló que tal América (1996)
- Moralejas (2004)

== See also ==
- Evangelical political parties in Latin America

Political offices
Preceded by Alejandro Maldonado	President of Guatemala; 2016–2020	Succeeded by Alejandro Giammattei
Party political offices
Preceded by Ricardo Sagastume; 2011, declined	National Convergence Front nominee for President of Guatemala; 2015	Succeeded by Estuardo Galdámez
Preceded by José Luis Quilo	Secretary-General of the National Convergence Front; 2013–2016	Succeeded by Édgar Ovalle
