= Cabinet of Bernardo Arévalo =

Arévalo Cabinet
- Cabinet of Guatemala
- 2024–present
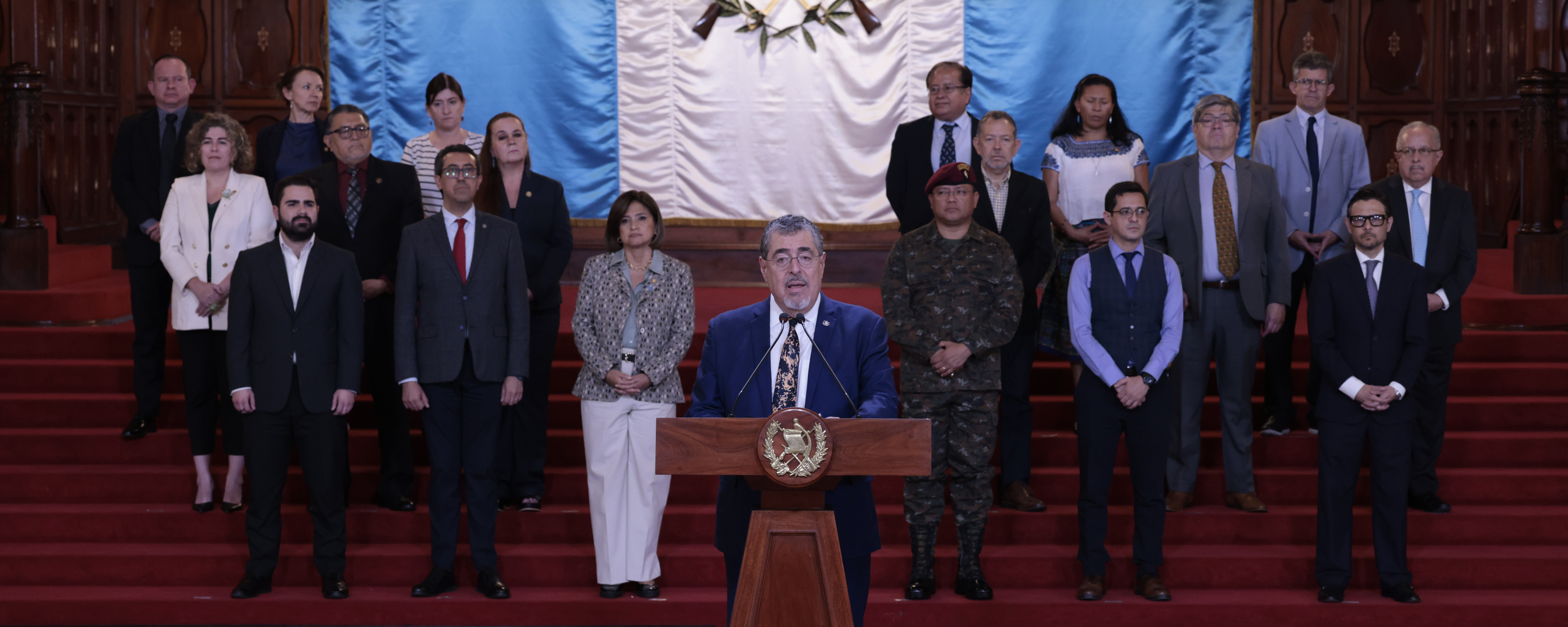
- Cabinet of President Bernardo Arévalo in August 2024
- Date formed: January 15, 2024

People and organisations
- President: Bernardo Arévalo
- President's history: Former Deputy of Congress (2020–2024); Former Ambassador to Spain (1995–1996); Former Deputy Minister of Foreign Affairs (1994–1995)
- Vice President: Karin Herrera
- Total no. of members: 14
- Member party: Semilla; Winaq

History
- Election: 2023 Guatemalan general election
- Predecessor: Cabinet of Alejandro Giammattei

The Cabinet of Bernardo Arévalo constitutes the fifty-second and current cabinet of Guatemala. It succeeds the Giammattei cabinet. From 28 November 2025 to 6 April 2026, Guatemala's cabinet achieved gender parity for the first time in the country's history.

The Cabinet's creation was part of the transition of power following the 2023 general election.

In addition to the 14 Ministry offices, there are 15 Secretary-level officials.

== Cabinet ==
The following have been named as Ministry appointees by the President of Guatemala.

Portfolio	Minister	Took office	Left office	Party
Minister of Agriculture, Livestock and Food	Maynor Estrada	January 15, 2024	May 8, 2025	Semilla
Minister of Agriculture, Livestock and Food	María Fernanda Rivera	May 9, 2025	Incumbent	Independent
Minister of Environment and Natural Resources	María José Iturbide	January 15, 2024	April 11, 2024	Independent
Minister of Environment and Natural Resources	Patricia Orantes	April 11, 2024	September 1, 2026	Semilla
Minister of Environment and Natural Resources	Edwin Castellanos	September 1, 2026	Incumbent	Independent
Minister of Communications, Infrastructure and Housing	Jazmín de la Vega	January 15, 2024	May 17, 2024	Independent
Minister of Communications, Infrastructure and Housing	Félix Alvarado	May 20, 2024	November 15, 2024	Semilla
Minister of Communications, Infrastructure and Housing	Paola Constantino	November 15, 2024	January 13, 2025	Independent
Minister of Communications, Infrastructure and Housing	Miguel Ángel Díaz	January 13, 2025	November 28, 2025	Independent
Minister of Communications, Infrastructure and Housing	Norma Zea Osorio	November 28, 2025	Incumbent	Independent
Minister of Culture and Sports	Liwy Grazioso	January 15, 2024	April 6, 2026	Independent
Minister of Culture and Sports	Luis Méndez Salinas	April 7, 2026	Incumbent	Independent
Minister of National Defense	Henry Saenz Ramos	January 15, 2024	Incumbent	Military
Minister of Social Development	Abelardo Pinto	January 15, 2024	Incumbent	Semilla
Minister of Economy	Gabriela García Pacheco	January 15, 2024	Incumbent	Independent
Minister of Education	Anabella Giracca	January 15, 2024	Incumbent	Semilla
Minister of Energy and Mines	Víctor Hugo Ventura Ruiz	January 15, 2024	July 2, 2026	Independent
Minister of Energy and Mines	Erwin Rolando Barrios Torres	July 2, 2026	Incumbent	Independent
Minister of Public Finance	Jonathan Menkos	January 19, 2024	September 30, 2026	Semilla
Minister of Public Finance	Débora Alvarado	September 30, 2026	October 13, 2026	Independent
Minister of Public Finance	Jonathan Menkos	October 13, 2026	Incumbent	Semilla
Minister of the Interior	Francisco Jiménez	January 15, 2024	October 15, 2025	Independent
Minister of the Interior	Marco Villeda Sandoval	October 24, 2025	Incumbent	Independent
Minister of Foreign Affairs	Carlos Ramiro Martínez	January 15, 2024	Incumbent	Independent
Minister of Public Health and Social Assistance	Óscar Cordón Cruz	January 15, 2024	June 12, 2024	Independent
Minister of Public Health and Social Assistance	Sandra Angelina Aparicio	June 12, 2024	July 15, 2024	Independent
Minister of Public Health and Social Assistance	Joaquín Barnoya Pérez	July 15, 2024	Incumbent	Independent
Minister of Labor and Social Welfare	Miriam Roquel Chávez	January 15, 2024	Incumbent	Winaq

Preceded by Giammattei Cabinet	Arévalo Cabinet; 2024	Succeeded by
