= Council of Ministers of Guatemala =

Council of Ministers
- Coat of arms of Guatemala

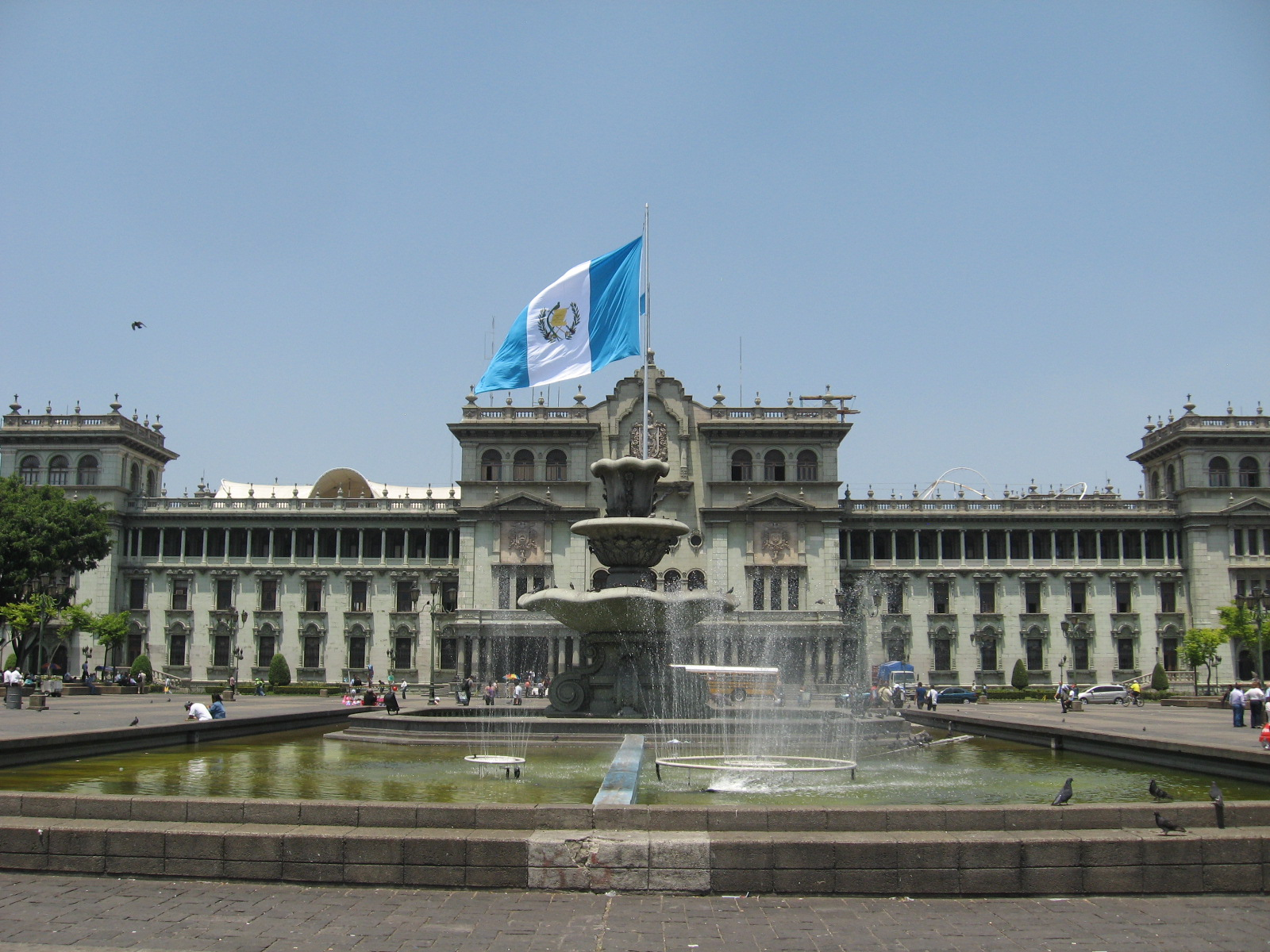
- The National Palace of Culture, seat of the Central Government.
- Formation: 1986
- President: Bernardo Arévalo
- Membership: 14

The Council of Ministers of Guatemala (Spanish: Consejo de Ministros de Guatemala) governs the country through the executive branch of Guatemala. There is a total of 14 ministries, each headed by a Minister that is appointed by the president.

== Current Ministers ==
The individuals listed below are the current Ministers and form a part of President Bernardo Arévalo's government.

| Logo | Ministry | Incumbent | Website |
|---|---|---|---|
| | Ministry of Agriculture, Livestock and Food (MAGA) | | www.maga.gob.gt |
| | Ministry of Agriculture, Livestock and Food (MAGA) | Maynor Estrada | www.maga.gob.gt |
| | Ministry of Environment and Natural Resources (MARN) | | www.marn.gob.gt |
| | Ministry of Environment and Natural Resources (MARN) | Patricia Orantes | www.marn.gob.gt |
| | Ministry of Communications, Infrastructure and Housing (CIV) | | www.civ.gob.gt |
| | Ministry of Communications, Infrastructure and Housing (CIV) | Félix Alvarado | www.civ.gob.gt |
| | Ministry of Culture and Sports (MCD) | | mcd.gob.gt |
| | Ministry of Culture and Sports (MCD) | Liwy Grazioso | mcd.gob.gt |
| | Ministry of National Defense (MINDEF) | | www.mindef.mil.gt |
| | Ministry of National Defense (MINDEF) | Henry Saenz Ramos | www.mindef.mil.gt |
| | Ministry of Social Development (MIDES) | | www.mides.gob.gt |
| | Ministry of Social Development (MIDES) | Abelardo Pinto | www.mides.gob.gt |
| | Ministry of Economy (MINECO) | | mineco.gob.gt |
| | Ministry of Economy (MINECO) | Gabriela García-Quinn | mineco.gob.gt |
| | Ministry of Education (MINEDUC) | | www.mineduc.gob.gt |
| | Ministry of Education (MINEDUC) | Anabella Giracca | www.mineduc.gob.gt |
| | Ministry of Energy and Mines (MEM) | | mem.gob.gt |
| | Ministry of Energy and Mines (MEM) | Víctor Hugo Ventura Ruiz | mem.gob.gt |
| | Ministry of Public Finance (MINFIN) | | www.minfin.gob.gt |
| | Ministry of Public Finance (MINFIN) | Jonathan Menkos | www.minfin.gob.gt |
| | Ministry of the Interior (MINGOB) | | mingob.gob.gt |
| | Ministry of the Interior (MINGOB) | Francisco Jiménez Irungaray | mingob.gob.gt |
| | Ministry of Foreign Affairs (MINEX) | | www.minex.gob.gt |
| | Ministry of Foreign Affairs (MINEX) | Carlos Ramiro Martínez | www.minex.gob.gt |
| | Ministry of Public Health and Social Assistance (MSPAS) | | www.mspas.gob.gt |
| | Ministry of Public Health and Social Assistance (MSPAS) | Óscar Cordón Cruz | www.mspas.gob.gt |
| | Ministry of Labor and Social Welfare (MINTRABAJO) | | mintrabajo.gob.gt |
| | Ministry of Labor and Social Welfare (MINTRABAJO) | Miriam Roquel Chávez | mintrabajo.gob.gt |

== List of cabinets ==
- Cabinet of Bernardo Arévalo
- Cabinet of Alejandro Giammattei
- Cabinet of Alejandro Maldonado
- Cabinet of Jimmy Morales
- Cabinet of Otto Pérez Molina

== See also ==
- Secretariats of the Presidency of Guatemala
- Politics of Guatemala
