= Cabinet of Alejandro Giammattei =

Giammattei Cabinet
- Cabinet of Guatemala
- 2020–2024
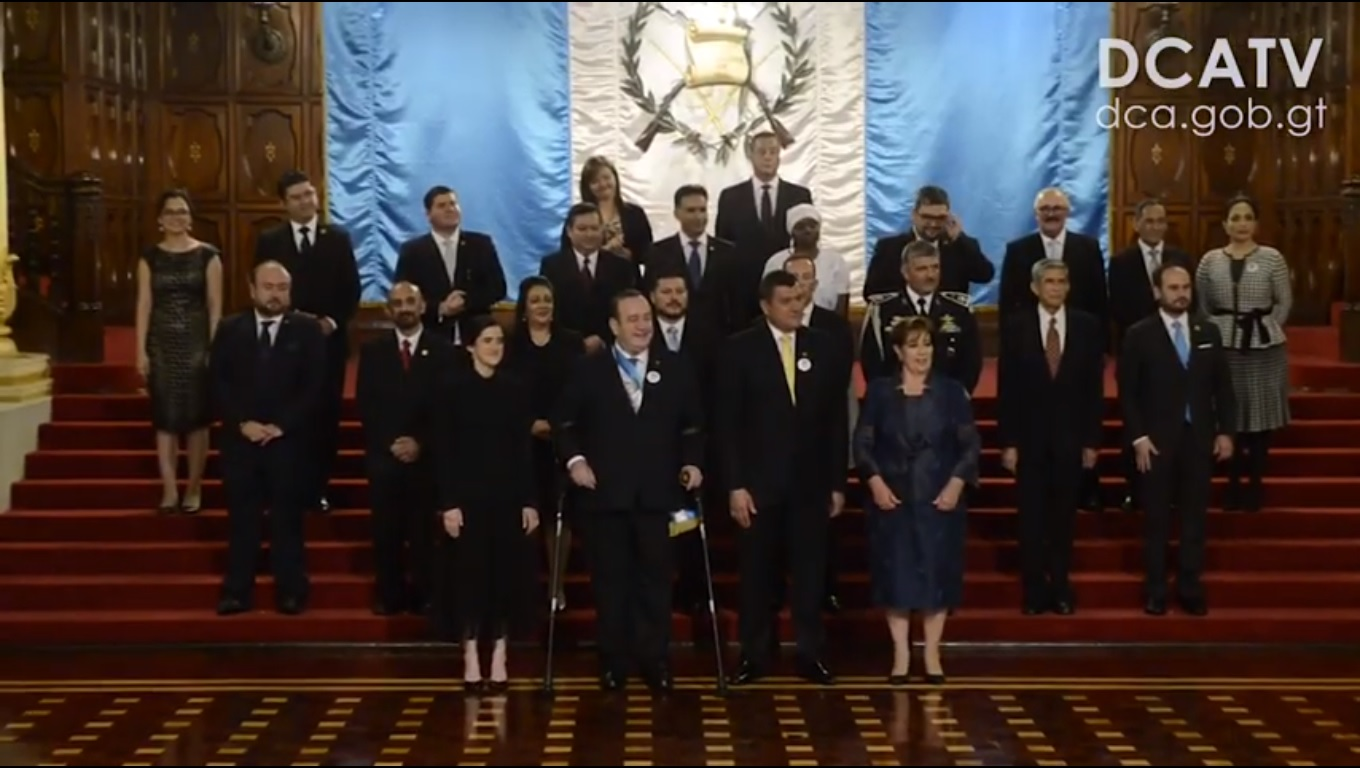
- Date formed: January 14, 2020
- Date dissolved: January 14, 2024

People and organisations
- President: Alejandro Giammattei
- Vice President: Guillermo Castillo Reyes
- No. of ministers: 14
- Member party: Vamos

History
- Election: 2019 Guatemalan general election
- Predecessor: Cabinet of Jimmy Morales
- Successor: Cabinet of Bernardo Arévalo

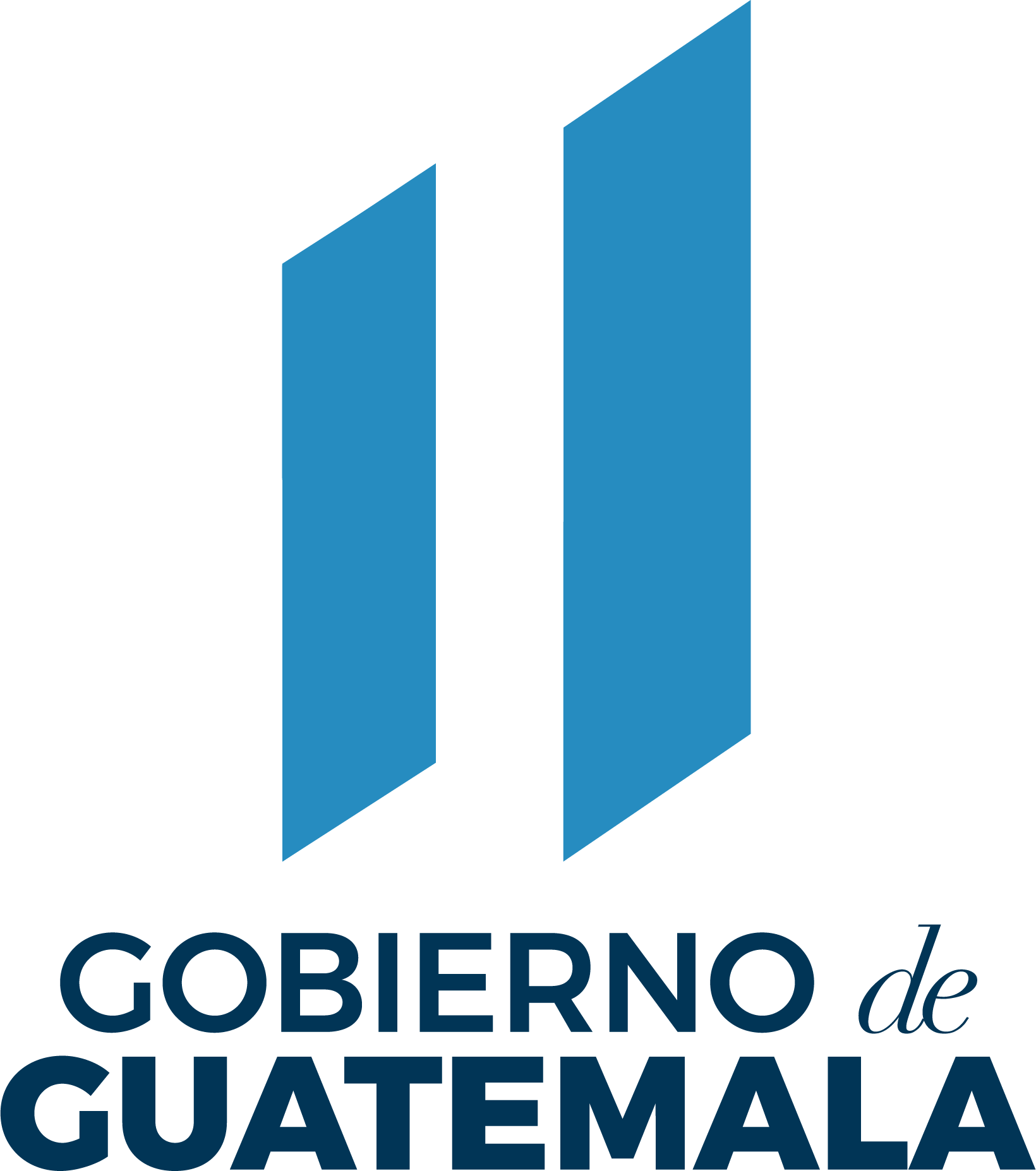
Logo used by the Government during Giammattei's presidency.

The Cabinet of Alejandro Giammattei constituted the fifty-first cabinet of Guatemala.

Giammattei's cabinet succeeded the Morales cabinet, after the 2019 general election. The officials took office on January 14, 2020, and dissolved on January 14, 2024.

== Composition ==
Portfolio	Minister	Took office	Left office	Party
Minister of Agriculture, Livestock and Food	Óscar Bonilla	14 January 2020	14 April 2020	Independent
Minister of Agriculture, Livestock and Food	José Ángel López	14 April 2020	15 November 2022	Independent
Minister of Agriculture, Livestock and Food	Edgar René De León Moreno	15 November 2022	14 January 2024	Independent
Minister of Environment and Natural Resources	Mario Rojas Espino	14 January 2020	17 October 2022	VIVA
Minister of Environment and Natural Resources	Gerson Barrios Garrido	17 October 2022	14 January 2024	Independent
Minister of Communications, Infrastructure and Housing	José Lemus Cifuentes	14 January 2020	29 June 2021	Vamos
Minister of Communications, Infrastructure and Housing	Javier Maldonado Quiñónez	1 July 2021	14 January 2024	Independent
Minister of Culture and Sports	Lidiette Martínez Cayetano	14 January 2020	10 September 2020	Vamos
Minister of Culture and Sports	Felipe Aguilar Marroquín	10 September 2020	14 January 2024	Vamos
Minister of National Defense	Juan Carlos Alemán Soto	14 January 2020	21 December 2021	Military
Minister of National Defense	Henry Yovani Reyes Chigua	21 December 2021	14 January 2024	Military
Minister of Social Development	Raúl Romero Segura	14 January 2020	17 October 2022	Vamos
Minister of Social Development	Héctor Cana Rivera	17 October 2022	14 January 2024	Independent
Minister of Economy	Antonio Malouf Morales	14 January 2020	11 March 2022	Independent
Minister of Economy	Janio Rosales Alegría	11 March 2022	11 July 2023	Independent
Minister of Economy	Luz Mariana Pérez Contreras	13 July 2023	14 January 2024	Independent
Minister of Education	Claudia Ruiz Casasola	14 January 2020	14 January 2024	Vamos
Minister of Energy and Mines	Alberto Pimentel Mata	14 January 2020	11 July 2023	Vamos
Minister of Energy and Mines	Manuel Eduardo Arita Sagastume	18 July 2023	14 January 2024	Independent
Minister of Public Finance	Álvaro González Ricci	14 January 2020	30 September 2022	Independent
Minister of Public Finance	Edwin Martínez Cameros	30 September 2022	14 January 2024	Independent
Minister of the Interior	Edgar Godoy Samayoa	14 January 2020	4 June 2020	Vamos
Minister of the Interior	Oliverio García Rodas	4 June 2020	3 November 2020	Independent
Minister of the Interior	Claudia Haydée Díaz León (acting)	3 November 2020	19 November 2020	Independent
Minister of the Interior	Gendri Reyes Mazariegos	19 November 2020	25 January 2022	Independent
Minister of the Interior	David Napoleón Barrientos Girón	25 January 2022	16 October 2023	Independent
Minister of the Interior	Byron René Bor Illescas	17 October 2023	14 January 2024	Independent
Minister of Foreign Affairs	Pedro Brolo Vila	14 January 2020	1 February 2022	Vamos
Minister of Foreign Affairs	Mario Búcaro	1 February 2022	14 January 2024	Independent
Minister of Public Health and Social Assistance	Hugo Monroy Castillo	14 January 2020	19 June 2020	Vamos
Minister of Public Health and Social Assistance	María Amelia Flores	19 June 2020	16 September 2021	Independent
Minister of Public Health and Social Assistance	Francisco Coma Martín	16 September 2021	14 January 2024	Independent
Minister of Labor and Social Welfare	Rafael Lobos Madrid	14 January 2020	1 July 2020	Independent
Minister of Labor and Social Welfare	Rafael Rodríguez Pellecer	1 July 2020	14 January 2024	Independent

Preceded by Morales Cabinet	Giammattei Cabinet; 2020–2024	Succeeded by Arévalo Cabinet
