= Cabinet of Otto Pérez Molina =

Forty-eighth cabinet of Guatemala

Molina Cabinet
- Cabinet of Guatemala
- 2012–2015
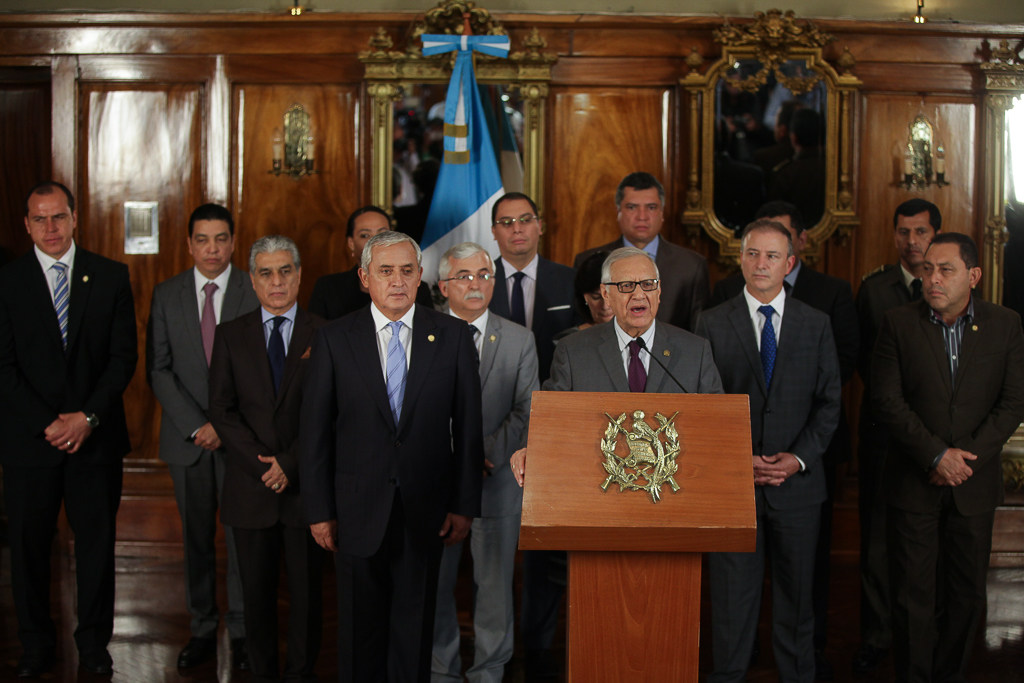
- Date formed: 14 January 2012
- Date dissolved: 3 September 2015

People and organisations
- President: Otto Pérez Molina
- Vice President: Alejandro Maldonado; Roxana Baldetti
- Member party: Patriotic Party

History
- Election: 2011 Guatemalan general election
- Predecessor: Colom Cabinet
- Successor: Cabinet of Alejandro Maldonado

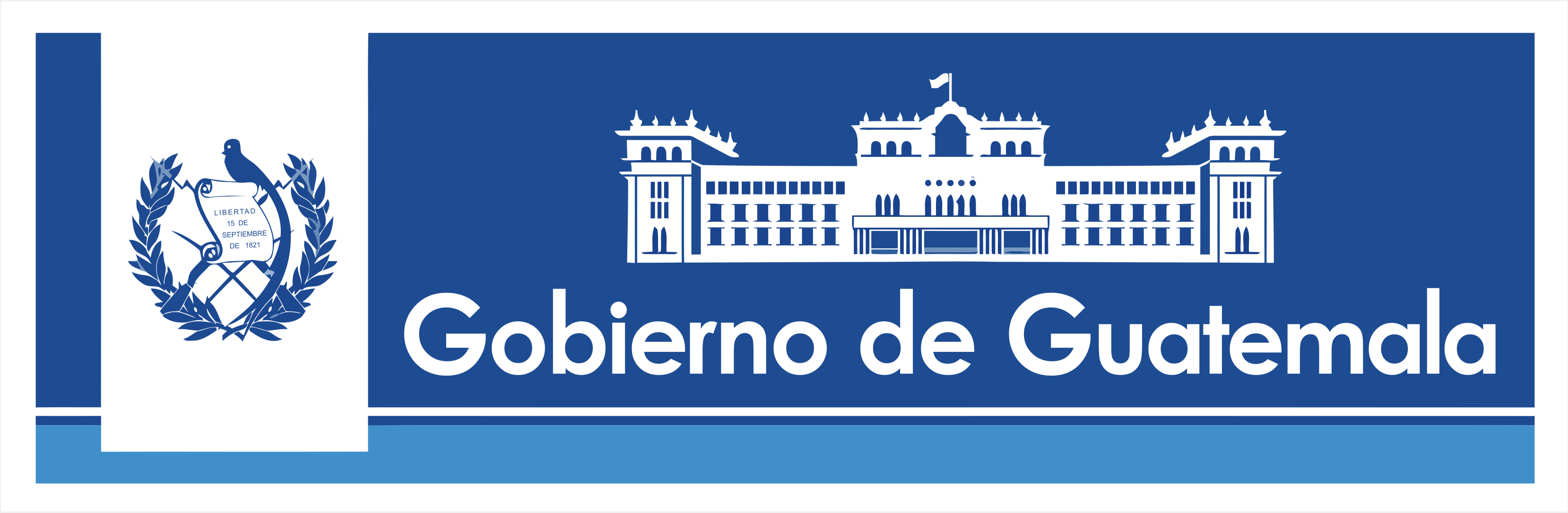
Logo used by the Government during Molina's presidency

The Cabinet of Otto Pérez Molina was the forty-eighth cabinet of Guatemala.

The cabinet took office on 14 January 2012 and ended after the resignation of Otto Pérez Molina on 3 September 2015.

== Composition ==
Portfolio	Minister	Took office	Left office	Party
Minister of Agriculture, Livestock and Food	Efraín Medina Guerra	14 January 2012	16 January 2013	VIVA
Minister of Agriculture, Livestock and Food	Elmer López Rodríguez	16 January 2013	13 February 2015	Independent
Minister of Agriculture, Livestock and Food	José Sebastián Marcucci	13 February 2015	3 September 2015	Independent
Minister of Environment and Natural Resources	Roxana Sobenes	14 January 2012	9 January 2014	Independent
Minister of Environment and Natural Resources	Michelle Martínez Kelly	10 January 2014	22 May 2015	Independent
Minister of Environment and Natural Resources	Oscar Medinilla Sánchez	22 May 2015	3 September 2015	Independent
Minister of Communications, Infrastructure and Housing	Alejandro Sinibaldi	14 January 2012	12 September 2014	PP
Minister of Communications, Infrastructure and Housing	Víctor Corado Váldez	12 September 2014	3 September 2015	Independent
Minister of Culture and Sports	Carlos Batzín Chojoj	14 January 2012	18 September 2014	PP
Minister of Culture and Sports	Dwight Pezzarossi	18 September 2014	3 September 2015	PP
Minister of National Defense	Ulises Noé Anzueto Girón	14 January 2012	16 July 2013	Military
Minister of National Defense	Manuel López Ambrosio	16 July 2013	16 July 2015	Military
Minister of National Defense	Williams Mansilla	16 July 2015	3 September 2015	Military
Minister of Social Development	Luz Lainfiesta Soto	25 January 2012	14 June 2013	Independent
Minister of Social Development	Leonel Rodríguez Lara	14 June 2013	3 September 2015	PRI
Minister of Economy	Sergio de la Torre Gimeno	14 January 2012	22 August 2015	Independent
Minister of Economy	Ricardo Sagastume	22 August 2015	3 September 2015	LIDER
Minister of Education	Cynthia del Águila	14 January 2012	22 August 2015	Independent
Minister of Education	Eligio Sic Ixpancoc	22 August 2015	3 September 2015	Independent
Minister of Energy and Mines	Erick Archila Dehesa	14 January 2012	15 May 2015	Independent
Minister of Energy and Mines	Edwin Rodas Solares	15 May 2015	21 May 2015	Independent
Minister of Energy and Mines	José Miguel de la Vega Izeppi	21 May 2015	3 September 2015	Independent
Minister of Public Finance	Pavel Centeno	14 January 2012	29 October 2013	PP
Minister of Public Finance	María Castro Mazariegos	29 October 2013	16 June 2014	Independent
Minister of Public Finance	Dorval Carías Samayoa	16 June 2014	3 September 2015	Independent
Minister of the Interior	Mauricio López Bonilla	14 January 2012	21 May 2015	PP
Minister of the Interior	Eunice Mendizábal	21 May 2015	3 September 2015	Independent
Minister of Foreign Affairs	Harold Caballeros	14 January 2012	13 January 2013	VIVA
Minister of Foreign Affairs	Fernando Carrera Castro	14 January 2013	16 September 2014	Independent
Minister of Foreign Affairs	Carlos Raúl Morales Moscoso	16 September 2014	3 September 2015	Independent
Minister of Public Health and Social Assistance	Francisco Arredondo	14 January 2012	10 April 2012	Independent
Minister of Public Health and Social Assistance	Jorge Villavicencio Álvarez	10 April 2012	24 September 2014	Independent
Minister of Public Health and Social Assistance	Luis Enrique Monterroso	24 September 2014	25 August 2015	Independent
Minister of Public Health and Social Assistance	Werner Ramírez Rivas	25 August 2015	3 September 2015	Independent
Minister of Labor and Social Welfare	Carlos Contreras	14 January 2012	3 June 2015	PP
Minister of Labor and Social Welfare	Carlos Ulban López	3 June 2015	3 September 2015	Independent

Preceded by Colom Cabinet	Pérez Cabinet; 2012–2015	Succeeded by Maldonado Cabinet
