= Education in Guatemala =

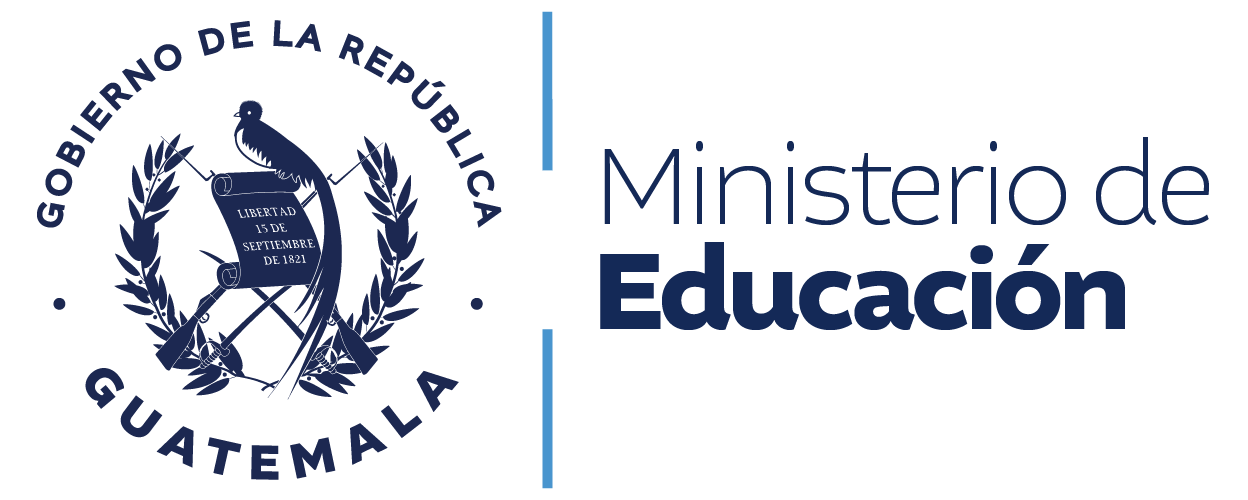

Ministry of Education
- Minister: Anabella Giracca

National education budget (2019)
- Budget: GTQ20.49 B US$2.68 B

General details
- Primary languages: Spanish
- Current system: 18 July 1872

Literacy (2018)
- Total: 81.5%

Enrollment
- Total: 3,571,000
- Primary: 2,350,000
- Secondary: 1,220,000
- Post secondary: 88,000

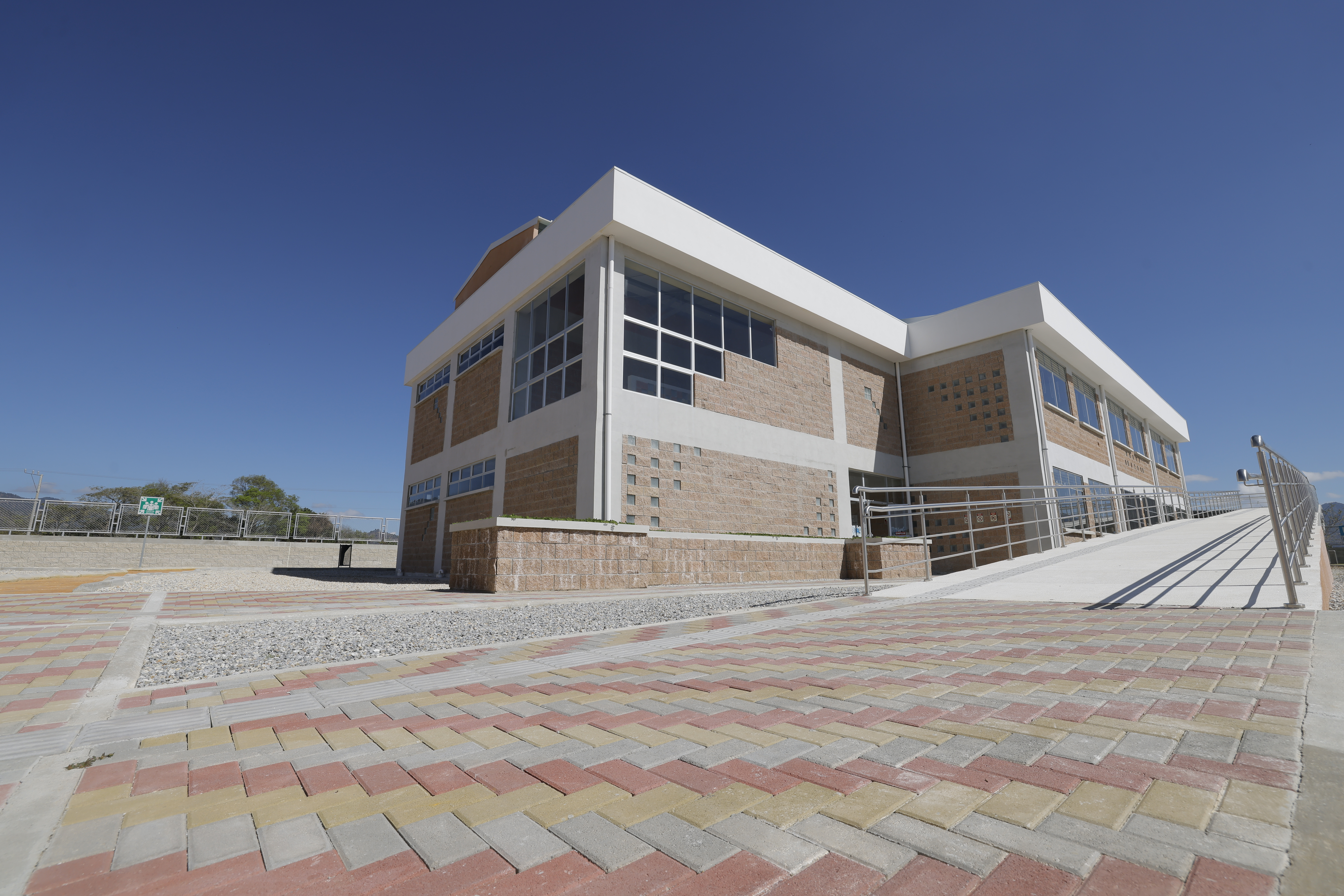
School building in San Pedro Pinula, Jalapa.

Education in Guatemala is under the jurisdiction of the Ministry of Education which oversees formulating, implementing and supervising the national educational policy. According to the Constitution of Guatemala, education is compulsory and free in public schools for the initial, primary and secondary levels. There is a five-tier system of education starting with primary school, followed by secondary school and tertiary education, depending on the level of technical training.

The official language of instruction is Spanish as mandated by the Education Law in 1965 when Spanish became the official language of Guatemala. However, Article 76 of the Constitution mandates bilingual education for regions with a predominantly indigenous population.

The Human Rights Measurement Initiative (HRMI) finds that Guatemala is fulfilling only 60.5% of what it should be fulfilling for the right to education based on the country's level of income. HRMI breaks down the right to education by looking at the rights to both primary education and secondary education. While taking into consideration Guatemala's income level, the nation is achieving 74.9% of what should be possible based on its resources (income) for primary education but only 46.2% for secondary education. 83.3% of the population age 15 and over is literate.

== Issues ==
In Guatemala, people 4 years of schooling in 2011 on average, 16.7% of the population are illiterate, with illiteracy rates up to more than 60% in the indigenous population. Indigenous people make up about 42% of the population in Guatemala and mostly reside in poor rural areas with little access to post-primary education. Compared to non-indigenous students who average 5.7 years of schooling, Indigenous students are at a disadvantage with an average of 2.5 years of schooling. Indigenous students achieve lower than non-indigenous (ladino) students in schooling possibly due to greater poverty and lack of indigenous language involvement in public schooling.

=== Education resources and Indigenous disadvantage ===
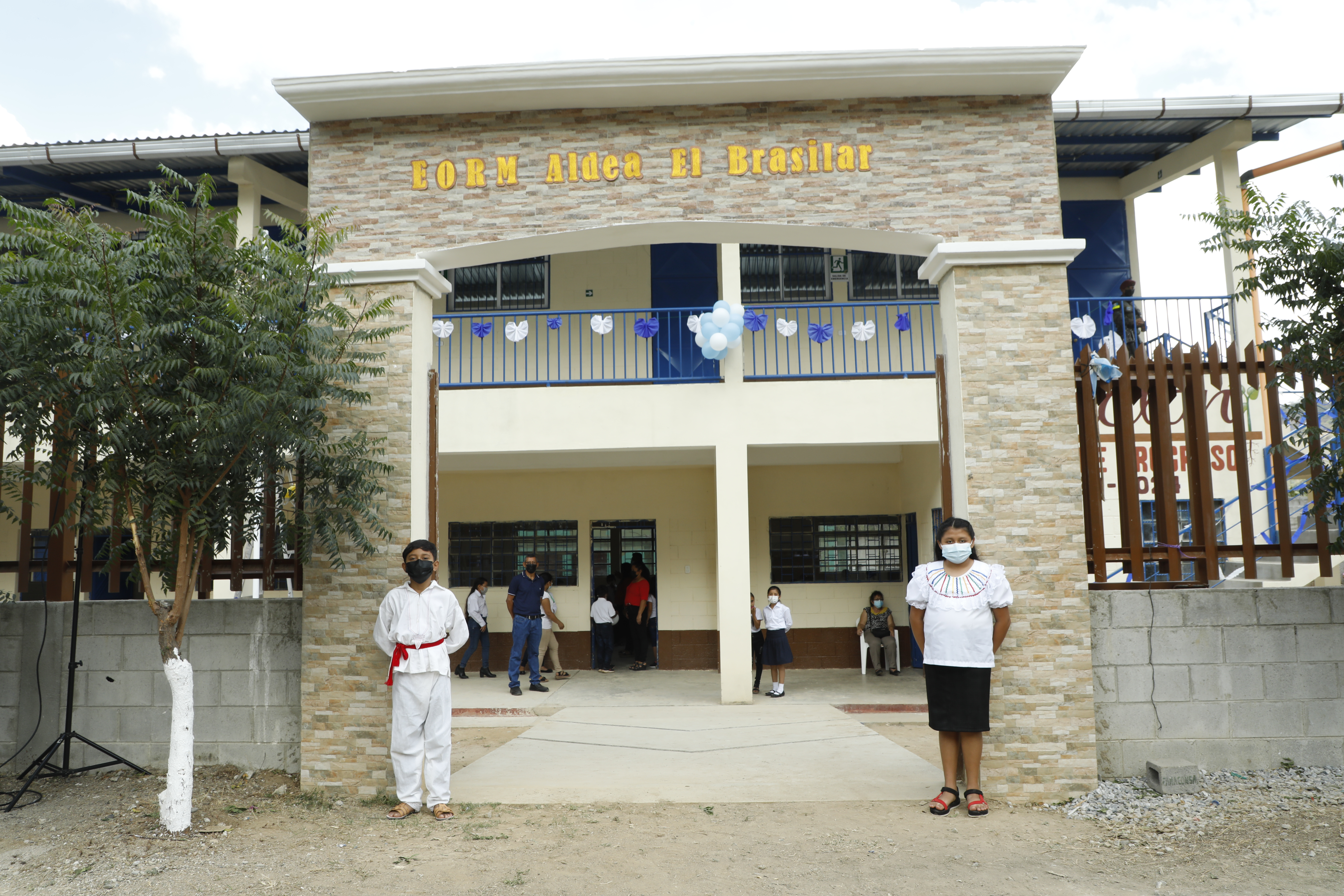
The entrance to a school in Camotán, Chiquimula

Indigenous student achievement is lower than non-indigenous student achievement. Indigenous parents have less schooling and lower socioeconomic status contributing to a poor education environment: schools with fewer educational materials, poor school infrastructure, and low quality educators. Indigenous students across Guatemala start schooling about 0.5 years later than ladino students. Already with disadvantaged backgrounds, indigenous students attend schools with fewer resources and perform worse on exams than non-indigenous students across Guatemala.

The recruitment and retaining of quality teachers poses a large problem in rural areas of Guatemala. Apart from the meagre pay, most teachers come from larger towns, where they have been able to receive higher education and, faced with a daily commute of a few hours to reach rural areas, many seek employment in the larger towns first. Indigenous students in rural schools therefore have lower teacher expectations which affects their achievement in school. The lack of curriculum guides or teaching materials in rural schools also hamper efforts to improve education standards in those areas.

The current state of education in Guatemala is significantly under-funded. Many classrooms nationwide, especially in rural Guatemala, do not meet minimum standards for classroom space, teaching materials, classroom equipment and furniture, and water/sanitation.

=== School attendance ===
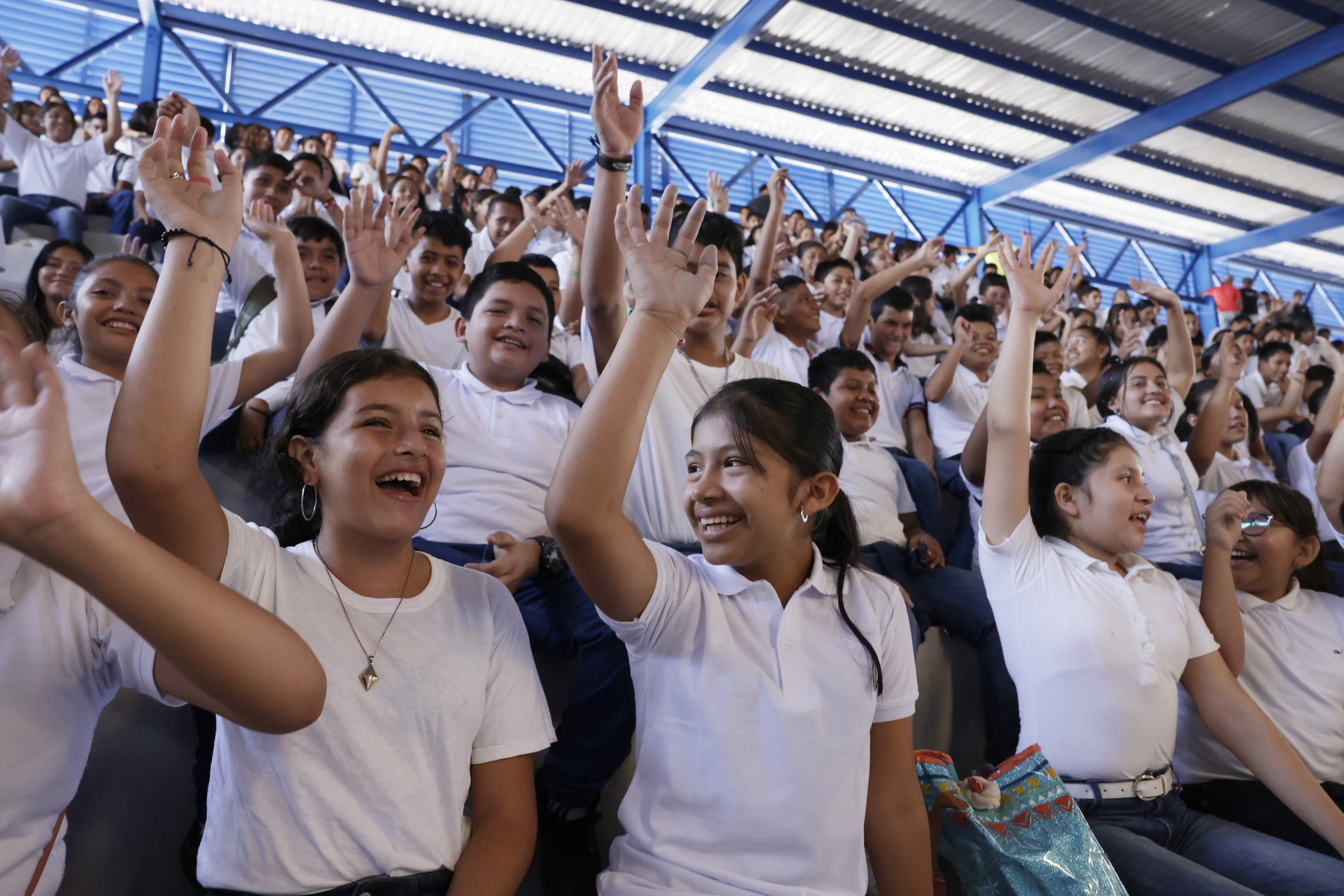
Students at a school ceremony in Santa Cruz Muluá, Retalhuleu.

With more than half the population of Guatemalans living below the poverty line, it is hard for children going to school, especially indigenous children, to afford the rising cost of uniforms, books, supplies and transportation — none of which are supplied by the government. This is exacerbated by the fact that, for poorer students, time spent in school could be time better spent working to sustain the family. It is especially hard for children living in rural areas to attend primary school. Most drop out due to the lack of access and largely inadequate facilities.

Indigenous students drop out starting at age 12 which is the transition age between primary and secondary level schools mostly due to economic constraints and demand for labor work. For indigenous males, the need to work for financial stability is the most frequent case for dropping out or not enrolling in school. Indigenous students are more likely to work instead of or while attending school. Poverty is thus the main deterrent to schooling for indigenous students—poverty and rural residence increases the likelihood of school incompletion and non enrollment.

Gender inequality in education is common — male literacy and school enrollment exceeds female rates in all aspects. Out of the 2 million children who do not attend school in Guatemala, the majority are indigenous girls living in rural areas. Most families subscribe to patriarchal traditions that tie women to a domestic role and the majority would rather send a son than a daughter to school if they could afford it. Mayan females are the least likely to enroll, start school late, and drop out the earliest compared to Mayan males and ladino males and females. Only 39% of indigenous females are literate compared to 68% of Mayan males, 87% Ladino males, and 77% Ladino women. Expectation of marriage and domestic duties for females, contributes to low investment in education—indigenous females marry younger than non-indigenous females and only 3% of married females enroll in school.

Guatemala's spending on education is one of the lowest in the world. In 2021, the country spent 3.1 percent of its GDP on education. By the late 2000s, the majority of Guatemalan schools had grid-supplied electricity, allowing for the use of electrical lighting, heating, and computers and the provision of running water for drinking and sanitation. However compared to other countries in Latin America, Guatemalan schools score mid-pack on measures such as the supply of potable water, and near the bottom on others such as the number of bathrooms. Research has found that lack of infrastructure such as adequate potable water, sewage services, or electricity and lack of educational materials such as textbooks in Guatemalan schools can have significant negative impacts on student performance.

Primary education has been compulsory in Guatemala since 1985, yet the populace has one of the lowest rates of cumulative education in Latin America. Educators in Guatemalan public schools often use teaching methods that do not account for the nearly 40% of students hailing from indigenous backgrounds who are non-native Spanish speakers. Monolingual Spanish instruction is used in linguistically diverse classrooms as there are about 20 Mayan languages in Guatemala. This is reflected in high rates of repetition of grades, for instance up to 30% in first grade. Compared to native Spanish speaking ladino students, Indigenous students often enter school without Spanish fluency and due to the language gap, achieve lower than other students. Research shows that bilingual education for indigenous students reduced grade repetition and dropout rates.

== Historical Context ==
Guatemala's Democratic Spring (1944-1954), was a period of social integration for Indigenous groups. In 1945 the democratic government of Guatemala established the Instituto Indigenista Nacional (IIN) allowing children in schools to learn to read in their native language first before learning Spanish. After a short democratic period, Guatemala suffered 36 years (1960-1996) of civil unrest, referred to as the Conflicto Armado or "armed conflict." Learning in native indigenous languages was no longer allowed after 1965 when the Education Law declared Spanish as the official language of Guatemala educational instruction. The shift from a democratic to an authoritarian state caused guerrilla movements to emerge and a civil war to break leading to the indiscriminate massacre of many indigenous groups across Guatemala creating systemic inequalities for the indigenous, particularly in politics and education.

=== Peace Accords ===
The Peace Accords of 1996, an agreement between the Guatemalan government and civilian groups under the United Nations, ended the 36 year armed conflict and "acknowledged the role of the educational sector in perpetuating racism via unequal access to schools, poor treatment of indigenous students, and discriminatory representations of indigenous culture in curricula" (Bellino, 65). The Peace Accords laid out steps to achieving education equality by increasing access to schooling, promoting bilingual instruction, encouraging community involvement, reforming school curriculum, and establishing decentralizing institutions.

A main objective of the Peace Accords was to increase schooling for rural and indigenous people and decentralize the education system, but many demands of the Peace Accords remain unfulfilled. There has not been an official introduction of indigenous languages to the education sector and inequalities between indigenous versus non indigenous groups remain. Demands in the Peace Accords are as follows:

- Intercultural and bilingual education will exist in every school
- Policies will recognize and strengthen Mayan identity and increase their access to education by incorporating indigenous pedagogical values in teaching.
- Government will fund implementation
- Females will have equal access to education

To counteract low levels of school funding, remittances to Guatemala from family members working abroad are often used for educational purposes such as school uniforms, home computers, and internet access. Remittances are also used to provide regular meals, electricity, and sanitation in the home, which enhance children's ability to access education. Families can also use remittances to hire labor, allowing children to stay in school rather than be pulled out to assist with farm work or domestic activities like caring for siblings. In some cases, successful migration has paradoxically given rise to "brain waste," in which male children especially view school as a waste of time because they plan on also migrating for work as soon as they are able in their teenage years. This outlook is reflected in findings showing that education is not highly valued in rural areas of Guatemala.

=== PRONADE ===
In attempts to reform the country's education system, particularly its rural schools, the Guatemalan government created the PRONADE (National Community-Managed Program for Educational Development), and PROESCOLAR (Education Development Program) initiatives in the 1990s to give communities more say in local school affairs. Together with the parents of students, these programs administered thousands of rural public and quasi-charter schools in the late 1990s and early 2000s, governing teacher hiring, monitoring teacher and student attendance, facilitating school food programs, and maintaining facilities.

PRONADE schools are located primarily in rural indigenous areas to increase access to schooling and improve the quality of education in rural Guatemala. Each community is represented by a Comite Educativo de Autogestion Educativa (COEDUCA) made up of parents and community members. PRONADE is successful in improving parent and community participation in schools and has expanded access to educational opportunities in rural areas.

==== Critiques and Challenges ====
PRONADE is not institutionalized by the Ministry of Education so it is not considered equivalent to traditional schooling. Teachers have provisional status and experience inconsistent salaries as it is determined by the community so several are unsatisfied. They are also not trained in intercultural and bilingual education which is a demand of the Peace Accords and which affects student achievement. PRONADE has increased access to education but repetition, non-enrollment, and dropout rates remain high.

PRONADE schools are self-managed schools that require voluntary parent and community management which is not always feasible for communities where PRONADE exists that are of the poorest and need to work. Insufficient finances force parents to invest in textbooks, teacher salaries, bills, etc from their own money which puts an additional financial burden on them. PRONADE is a low cost to the government but a high cost to communities which influences the quality of education that students receive. Some critics believe that PRONADE, a top-down approach, fails to address the educational inequalities of poor indigenous people and rather perpetuates extreme poverty in rural Guatemala.

== See also ==
- List of universities in Guatemala
- Intercultural bilingual education in Guatemala
