= Liwy Grazioso =

Guatemalan archaeologist and politician)

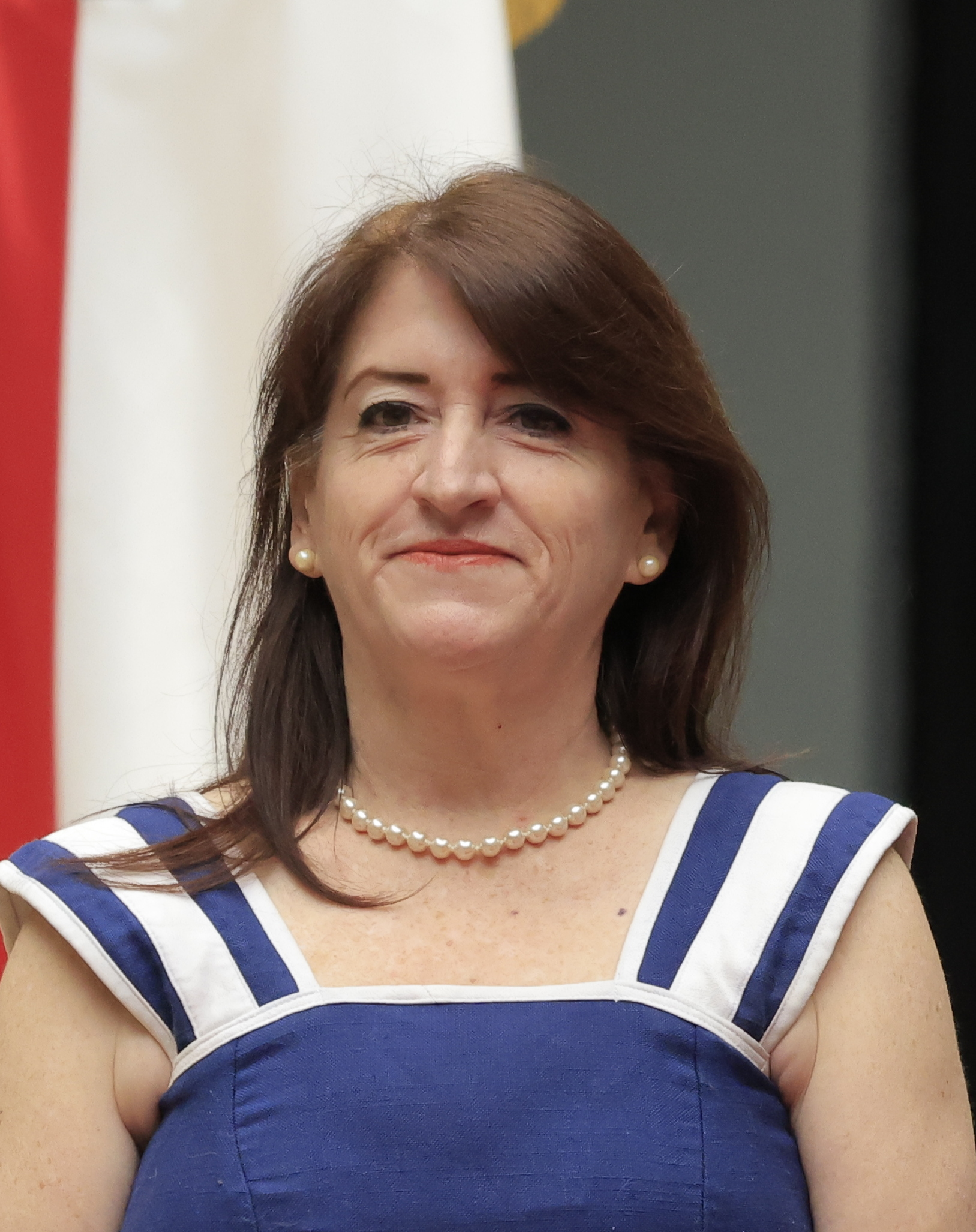
- Liwy Grazioso in 2024

Minister of Culture and Sports
- In office 15 January 2024 – 6 April 2026
- President: Bernardo Arévalo
- Preceded by: Felipe Aguilar
- Succeeded by: Luis Méndez Salinas

Personal details
- Party: Independent
- Education: National School of Anthropology and History

Liwy del Carmen Immacolata Grazioso Sierra is a Guatemalan archaeologist, academic and politician. She served as Minister of Culture and Sports of Guatemala between 2024 and 2026. She previously directed the Museo Miraflores.

== Education ==
Grazioso obtained a degree in archaeology from the National School of Anthropology and History in Mexico, where she also completed a master’s degree in Mesoamerican studies.

== Career ==
She has devoted her professional career primarily to the conservation of cultural heritage and coordinated the project to restructure the National Museum of Anthropology of Mexico. Grazioso directed the Museo Miraflores.

On 8 January 2024, newly elected President Bernardo Arévalo presented his cabinet and announced Liwy Grazioso as the new minister of culture and sports. She was sworn in on 15 January 2024 by President Arévalo at National Palace. She spearheaded conservation projects for sites such as Takalik Abaj, including initiatives focused on sustainable management and the use of technology to protect cultural heritage.

During her tenure Grazioso faced controversy over the raid on the Museum of Colonial Art in Antigua Guatemala, where the Public Prosecutor’s Office seized numerous cultural artefacts. She was also accused of a potential conflict of interest in arms procurement contracts linked to family members, which is being investigated by the Public Prosecutor’s Office. Furthermore, she faced criticism for authorising a project at the University of San Carlos, which led to institutional conflict and the closure of the campus.

She represented Guatemala at the funeral of Pope Francis on 26 April 2025.

Grazioso resigned for personal reasons on 6 April 2026 during a cabinet meeting, which President Arévalo confirmed shortly afterwards at a press conference. She was succeeded by Luis Méndez Salinas the following day.
