= Secretariats of the Presidency of Guatemala =

Secretariats of the Presidency
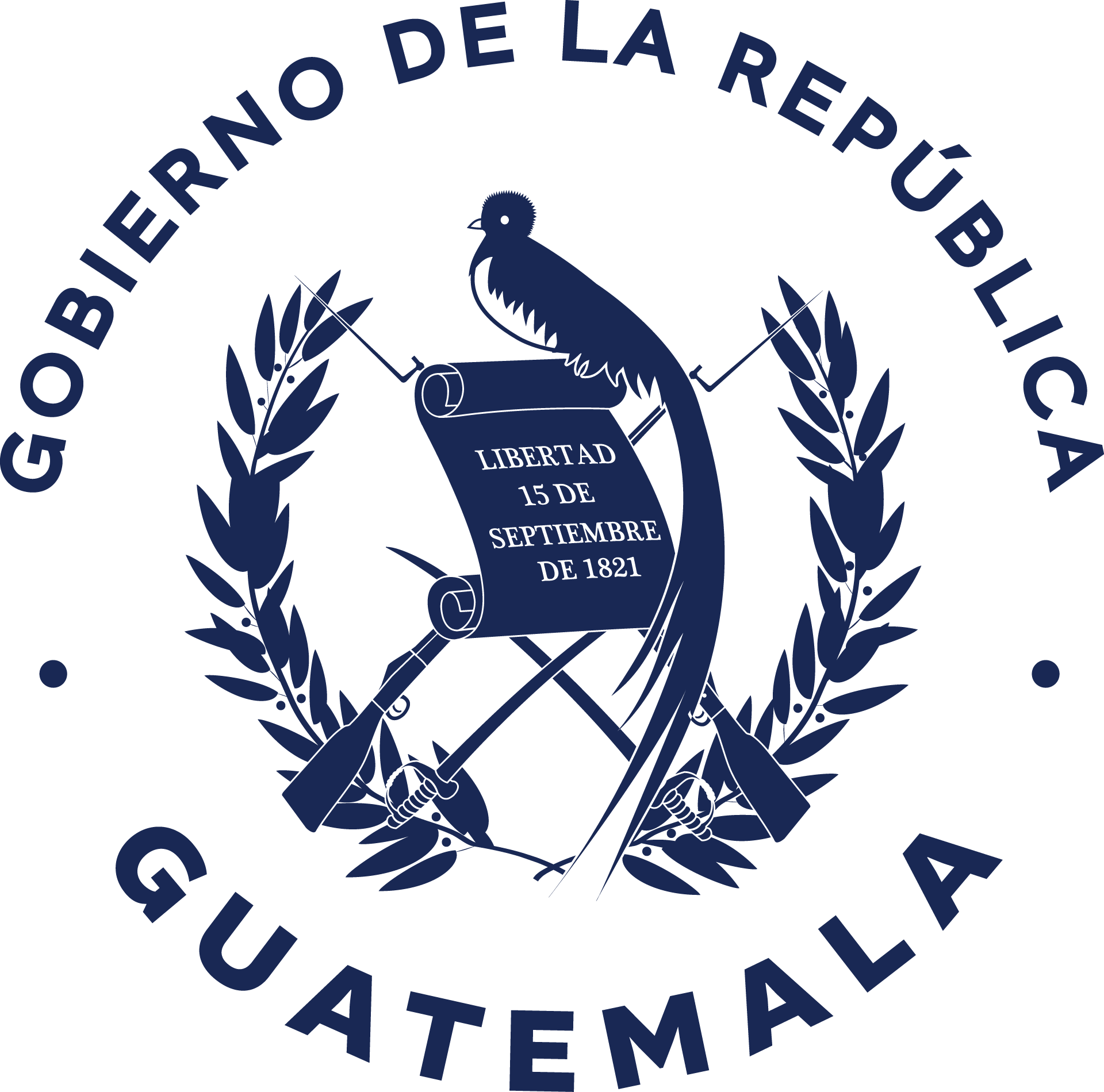
- Current government logo
- Headquarters: Guatemala City, Guatemala
- President of Guatemala: Bernardo Arévalo
- Membership: 12 members (incl. Secretariats of the Vice President)

The Secretariats of the Presidency is a body within the executive branch of the Guatemalan government that supports the functions and agenda of the President. Secretariats are restricted from executing government programs, projects, or other functions designated to Ministries or other government institutions. However, the Executive Secretariat of the Presidency can perform such functions on behalf of the President.

== Current Secretariats ==
The individuals listed below are the current Secretariats of the Presidency and form a part of President Bernardo Arévalo's government.

Logo	Office	Secretariat	Website
	General Secretariat of the Presidency (SGP)		sgp.gob.gt/web/
	General Secretariat of the Presidency (SGP)	Juan Gerardo Guerrero	sgp.gob.gt/web/
	Private Secretariat of the Presidency (SPP)		www.secretariaprivada.gob.gt
	Private Secretariat of the Presidency (SPP)	Ana Glenda Tager Rosado	www.secretariaprivada.gob.gt
	Executive Secretariat of the Presidency (SCEP)		scep.gob.gt
	Executive Secretariat of the Presidency (SCEP)	Victor Hugo Monroy Morales	scep.gob.gt
	Secretariat of Social Communications of the Presidency (SCSPR)		www.scspr.gob.gt
	Secretariat of Social Communications of the Presidency (SCSPR)	Haroldo Sánchez	www.scspr.gob.gt
	Secretariat of Planning and Programming of the Presidency (SEGEPLAN)		portal.segeplan.gob.gt/segeplan/
	Secretariat of Planning and Programming of the Presidency (SEGEPLAN)	Cristian Esaú Espinoza Sandoval	portal.segeplan.gob.gt/segeplan/
	Secretariat of Administrative and Security Affairs (SAAS)		www.saas.gob.gt
	Secretariat of Administrative and Security Affairs (SAAS)	Ivan Carpio Alfaro	www.saas.gob.gt
	Secretariat of Social Welfare (SBS)		www.sbs.gob.gt
	Secretariat of Social Welfare (SBS)	Marvin Rabanales García	www.sbs.gob.gt
	Presidencial Secretariat of Women Affairs (SEPREM)		seprem.gob.gt
	Presidencial Secretariat of Women Affairs (SEPREM)	Ana Leticia Aguilar Theissen	seprem.gob.gt
	Secretariat of Social Work of the President's Wife (SOSEP)		www.sosep.gob.gt
	Secretariat of Social Work of the President's Wife (SOSEP)	Zulma Melizza Calderón Ordóñez	www.sosep.gob.gt

=== Secretariats of the Vice President ===
The Secretariats below are headed by the vice president.

Logo	Office	Secretariat	Website
	National Secretariat of Administration of Extinction Assets (SENABED)		http//www.senabed.gob.gt/
	National Secretariat of Administration of Extinction Assets (SENABED)	Gloria Verna Guillermo Lemus	http//www.senabed.gob.gt/
	National Secretariat of Science and Technology (SENACYT)		https//www.senacyt.gob.gt
	National Secretariat of Science and Technology (SENACYT)	Gabriela Montenegro Bethancourt	https//www.senacyt.gob.gt
	Secretariat Against Sexual Violence, Exploitation and Human Trafficking (SVET)		svet.gob.gt
	Secretariat Against Sexual Violence, Exploitation and Human Trafficking (SVET)	Danissa Ramírez	svet.gob.gt

== Former offices ==
On 12 March 2020, President Giammattei announced the closure of the Peace Secretariat (SEPAZ) and Secretariat of Agrarian Affairs (SAA).

The Secretariat of Tourism and Secretariat of Strategic Analysis were abolished in July 2015 during the Molina administration.

Former office	Acronym	Period
Peace Secretariat	SEPAZ	1997-2020
Secretariat of Agrarian Affairs	SAA	1997-2020
Secretariat of Strategic Analysis	SAE	2012-2015
Secretariat of Tourism	—	2012-2015

== See also ==
- Council of Ministers of Guatemala
- Politics of Guatemala
- Cabinet of Bernardo Arévalo
