= Gabriela García-Quinn =

Guatemalan economist and politician)

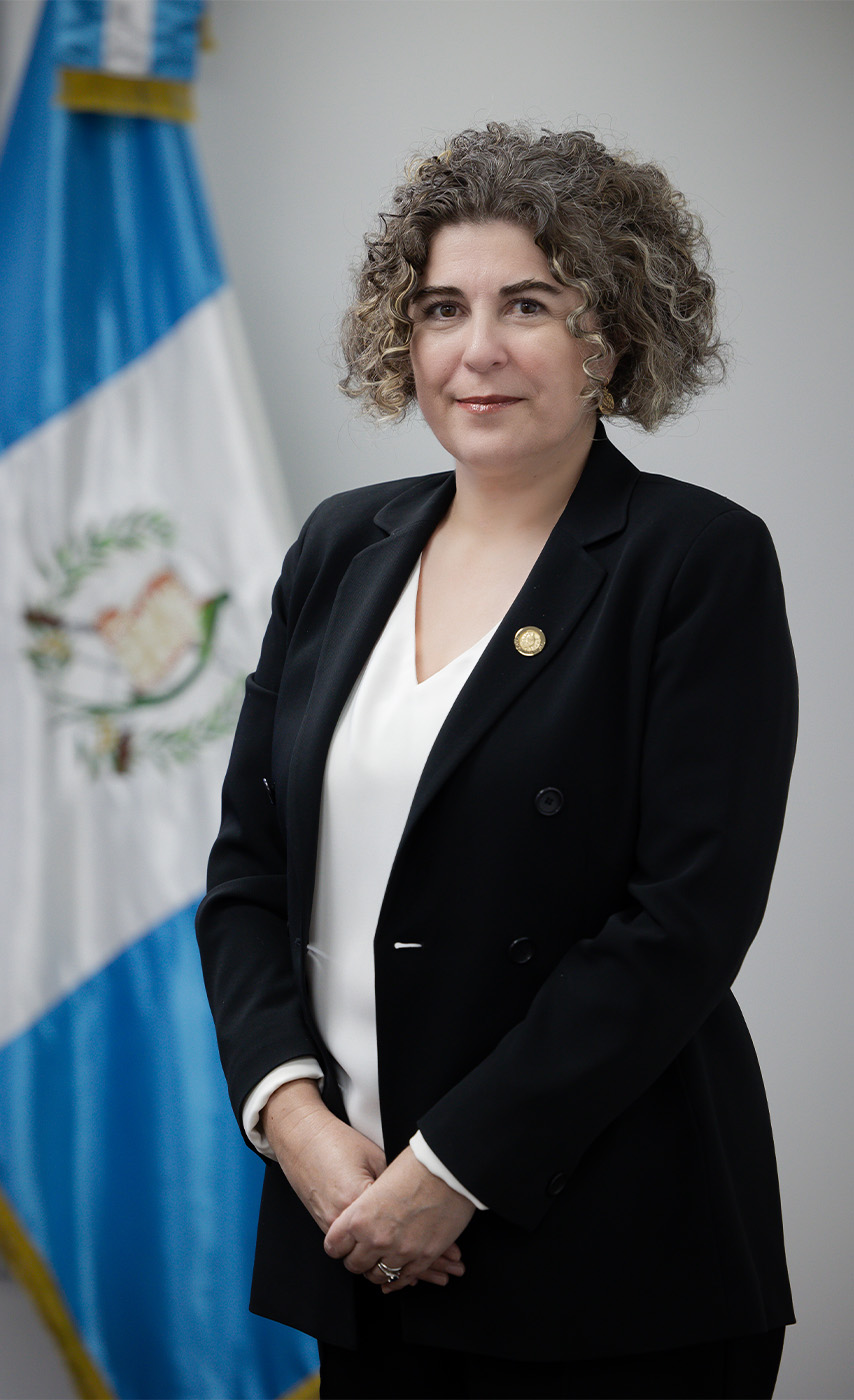
- Official portrait, 2024

Minister of Economy
- Incumbent
- Assumed office 15 January 2024
- President: Bernardo Arévalo
- Preceded by: Luz Mariana Pérez Contreras

Personal details
- Party: Independent
- Education: American University

Adriana Gabriela García Pacheco is a Guatemalan economist. She has served as Minister of Economy of Guatemala since 2024.

== Education ==
García-Quinn herself obtained a degree in international relations from American University in Washington D.C., where she also earned a master’s degree in development project management. She also hold a diploma in NGO's management.

== Career ==
She has over 25 years’ professional experience in attracting trade, investment and economic development for children and the agricultural sector, in Guatemala and the region.

Between 2006 and 2010, she coordinated projects within the National Competitiveness Programme, and until 2024 she led the Trade and Investment Promotion team for the 'Creating Economic Opportunities’ project, and also became director of the Glasswing International Foundation. García-Quinn also worked for the USAID.

On 8 January 2024, newly elected President Bernardo Arévalo presented his cabinet and announced Gabriela García as the new Minister of Economy. She was sworn in on 15 January 2024 by President Arévalo at National Palace.

At a conference with the Guatemalan Chamber of Agriculture on 30 January 2024, García-Quinn outlined the priorities of her portfolio for 2024, highlighting the importance of agribusiness, dialogue to foster an economic framework for sustained growth, the digitisation of administrative procedures, legal certainty, and the establishment of a "stable and modern" framework to attract foreign investment and promote domestic investment. In February 2024, during a visit to Spain to the CEOE, She stated that the government would focus on new economic sectors, such as renewable energy and the pharmaceutical and medical industries.

In March 2024 she presented the "Action plan for the Guatemalan economy".
