= Anabella Giracca =

Guatemalan educator, writer and politician

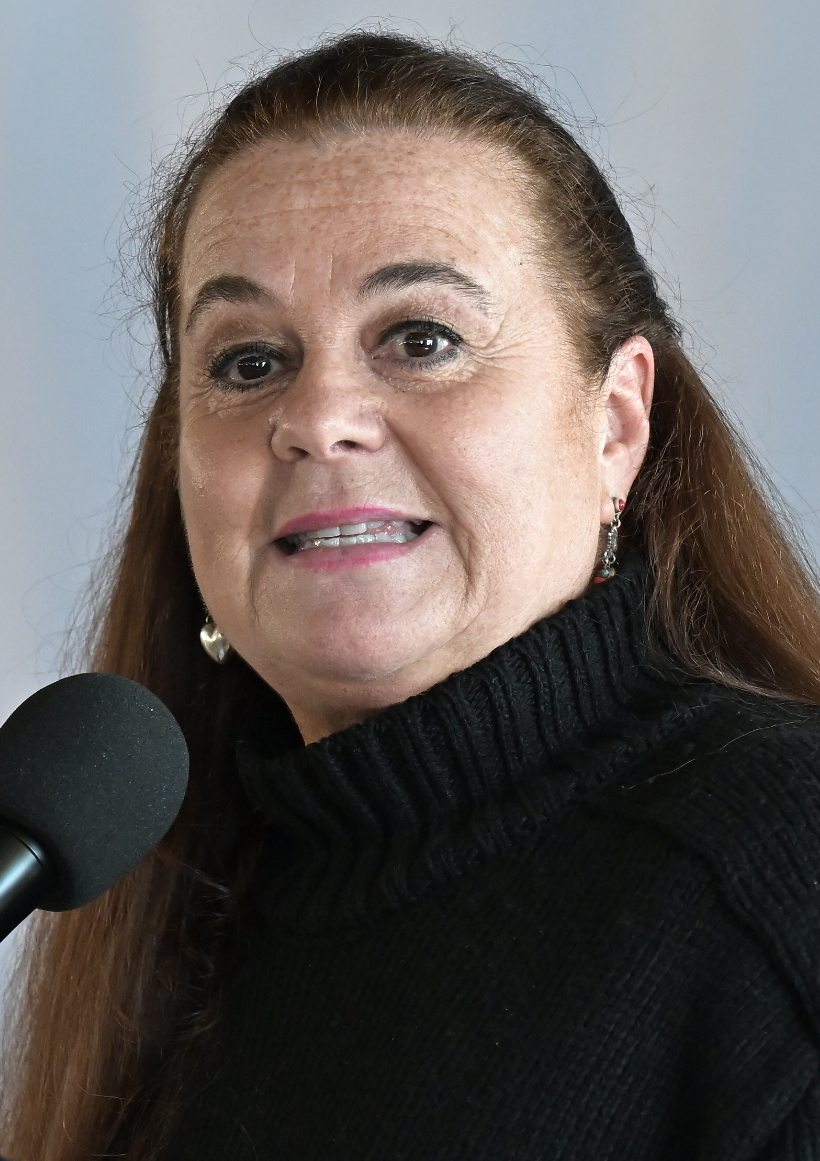
- Giracca in February 2024

Minister of Education
- Incumbent
- Assumed office 15 January 2024
- President: Bernardo Arévalo
- Preceded by: Claudia Ruíz Casasola

Personal details
- Born: 14 October 1962 (age 64) Guatemala City, Guatemala
- Party: Movimiento Semilla (until 2026); Roots (from 2026)
- Education: Rafael Landívar University

Anabella María Giracca Méndez (born 14 October 1962) is a Guatemalan educator, writer and politician. She has been serving as Minister of Education of Guatemala since 2024. She is co-founder of the Movimiento Semilla.

== Career ==
Giracca holds a degree in literature and philosophy and has a long career in education and human rights, focusing primarily on the protection of children and indigenous peoples. As a writer, she has authored essays, columns, novels and children’s stories.

She has coordinated the Bilingual Literacy Programme at Rafael Landívar University and directed the Institute of Linguistics and Interculturality, the UNESCO Chair in Communication for the Strengthening of Cultural Diversity, and programmes for rural teachers. She is one of the co-founders of the Movimiento Semilla.

Giracca has also served as an advisor to the Academy of Mayan Languages and has been involved in the management of teacher training programmes in rural areas of the country. Since at least 2008, Giracca has been promoting the idea of establishing a university of the Maya people.

On 8 January 2024, newly elected President Bernardo Arévalo presented his cabinet and announced Anabella Giracca as the new minister of education. She was sworn in on 15 January 2024 by President Arévalo at National Palace.

In January 2026, Giracca noted that 28,000 teachers had been recruited over a two-year period and that 20,000 new pupils would have been enrolled in secondary schools. In May 2026, following protests by teachers, Giracca and Arévalo met with teachers’ representatives to take steps towards appointing many teachers to permanent posts.
