= María José Iturbide =

Guatemalan politician and biologist

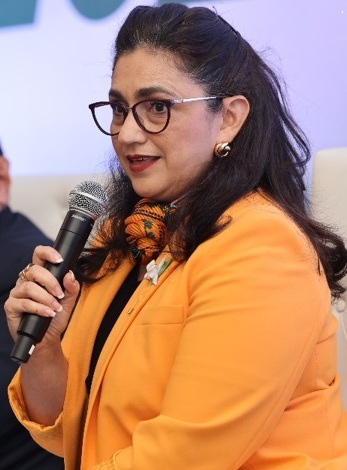

Minister of Environment
- In office 15 January 2024 – 11 April 2024
- President: Bernardo Arévalo
- Preceded by: Gerson Barrios Garrido
- Succeeded by: Patricia Orantes

Personal details
- Party: Independent
- Education: Lincoln University; Universidad del Valle de Guatemala

María José Iturbide is a Guatemalan biologist with more than 25 years of experience in natural resources management. She served as minister of environment and natural resources. She served from January 2024 to 11 April 2024 until President Bernardo Arévalo fired Iturbide after it was made aware that Iturbide assigned security and state vehicles to her daughter for her personal activities.

== Biography ==
María José Iturbide has a B.Sc from the Universidad del Valle de Guatemala, a master's degree in environmental science and a PhD in Environmental Policy and Planning from the Lincoln University in New Zealand.

Prior to her ministerial nomination, she served as the Executive Director of the Foundation for Water Conservation (Funcagua) and advocated for the protection of the country's water resources. Under her management, the First State of Water Report in the Metropolitan Region of Guatemala was published, and the only groundwater monitoring system in Guatemala was established, monitoring more than 300 municipal wells. She promoted rainwater harvesting systems, water recharge, and nature-based solutions in the law. She also worked as the Director of the Wildlife Department of the National Council of Protected Areas Protected Areas.

== Dismissal ==
On 7 April 2024, President Arévalo dismissed Iturbide. His decision came after a report was published by Vox Populi on 4 April, which revealed that María Fernanda Iturbide, daughter of Minister Iturbide, had used state vehicles for personal activities. Later, Iturbide spoke on the matter, acknowledging the poor procedure, and explained that the decision was made due to persecution and threats against her following the dismissal of corrupt individuals within the Environmental Minister. In writing, she requested the Ministry of the Interior to provide her with appropriate protection. The Secretary General of the Presidency published a statement on behalf of Arévalo, stating that the decision was made to "avoid any doubt about the commitment of his administration and tolerance to the misuse of State resources and corruption."
