= Héctor Melvyn Caná Rivera =

Guatemalan politician

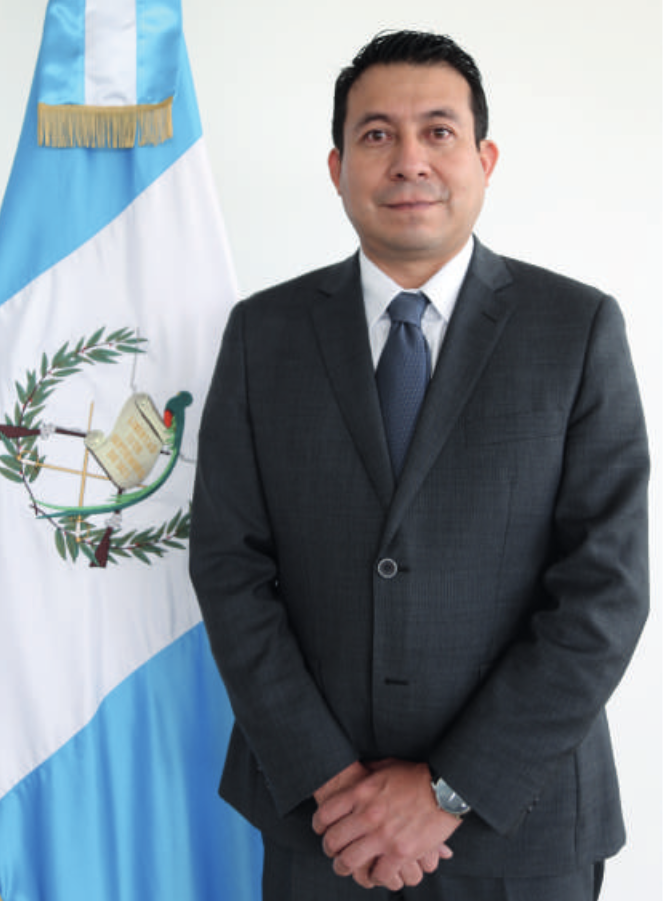

Minister of Social Development
- In office 17 October 2022 – 14 January 2024
- President: Alejandro Giammattei
- Preceded by: Raúl Romero Segura
- Succeeded by: Abelardo Pinto

Héctor Melvyn Caná Rivera is a Guatemalan politician who served as the Minister of Social Development, from October 2022 to January 2024, under the government of Alejandro Giammattei. Rivera was previously a council member of the Municipality of Chimaltenango between 2012 and 2016.
