= Edgar René De León Moreno =

Guatemalan politician

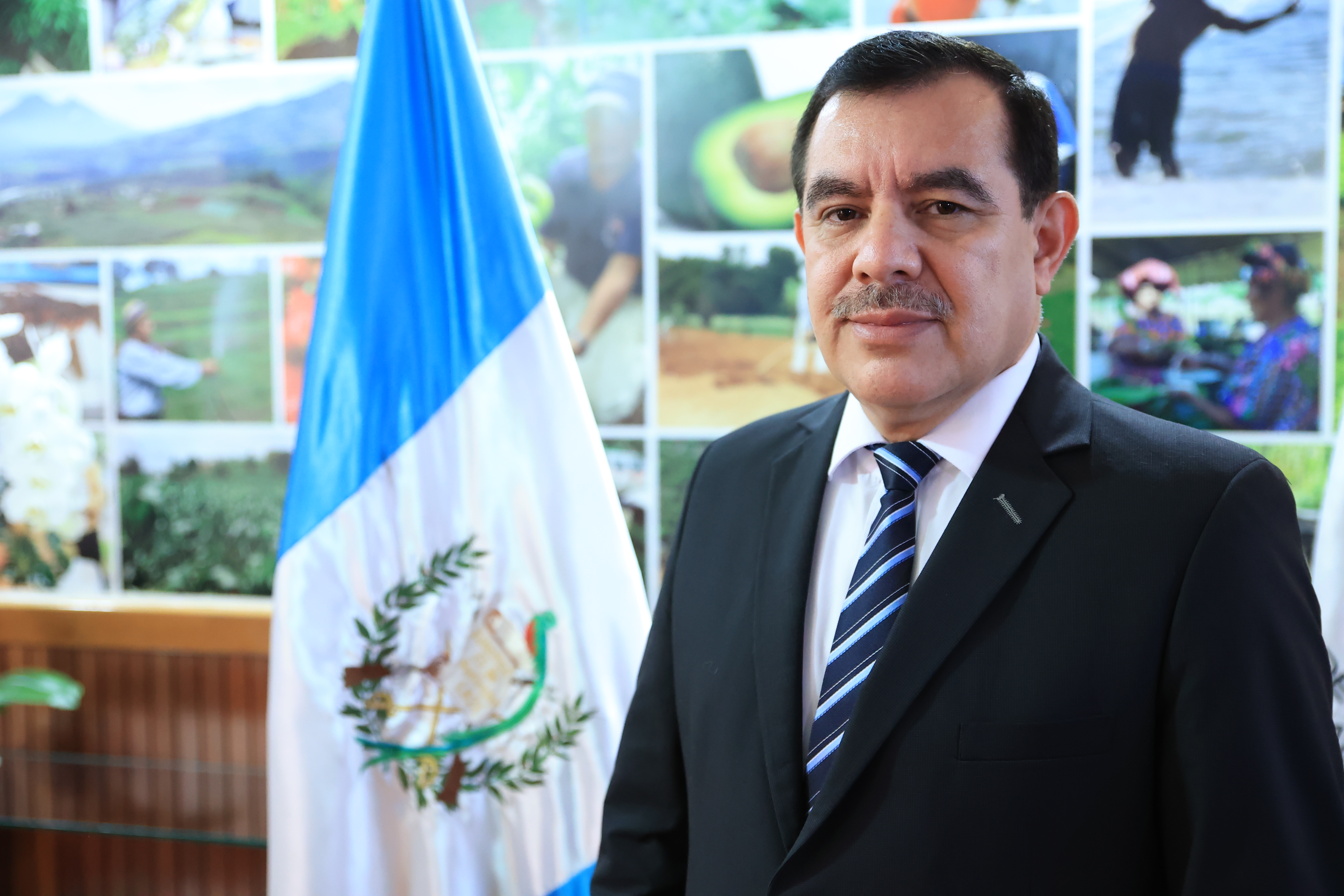
Edgar René De León Moreno in 2022.

Edgar René De León Moreno is a Guatemalan politician who served as the Minister of Agriculture, Livestock and Food from November 2022 to January 2024, under the government of Alejandro Giammattei.
