= Ministry of Agriculture, Livestock and Food (Guatemala) =

Government ministry of Guatemala

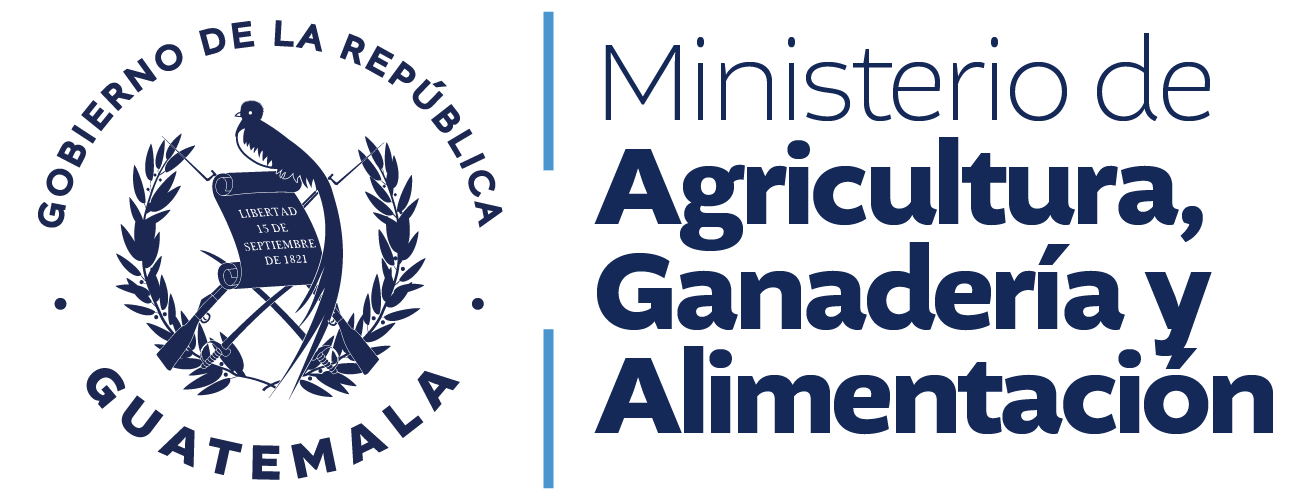
- Ministry logo

Ministry overview
- Formed: May 21, 1920; 106 years ago
- Jurisdiction: Guatemala
- Ministry executive: María Fernanda Rivera, Minister
- Website: maga.gob.gt

The Ministry of Agriculture, Livestock and Food (Spanish: Ministerio de Agricultura, Ganadería y Alimentación or MAGA) is a government ministry of Guatemala, headquartered in Guatemala City.

== List of ministers ==
Minister	President	Cabinet	Term start	Term end
Efraín Medina Guerra	Otto Pérez Molina	Cabinet of Otto Pérez Molina	14 January 2012	16 January 2013
Elmer López Rodríguez	Otto Pérez Molina	Cabinet of Otto Pérez Molina	16 January 2013	13 February 2015
José Sebastián Marcucci	Otto Pérez Molina	Cabinet of Otto Pérez Molina	13 February 2015	3 September 2015
José Sebastián Marcucci	Alejandro Maldonado	Cabinet of Alejandro Maldonado	3 September 2015	14 January 2016
Mario Méndez Cóbar	Jimmy Morales	Cabinet of Jimmy Morales	14 January 2016	14 January 2020
Óscar Bonilla	Alejandro Giammattei	Cabinet of Alejandro Giammattei	14 January 2020	14 April 2020
José Ángel López	Alejandro Giammattei	Cabinet of Alejandro Giammattei	14 April 2020	15 November 2022
Edgar René De León Moreno	Alejandro Giammattei	Cabinet of Alejandro Giammattei	15 November 2022	14 January 2024
Maynor Estrada	Bernardo Arévalo	Cabinet of Bernardo Arévalo	15 January 2024	Incumbent
