= Patricia Orantes =

Guatemalan politician

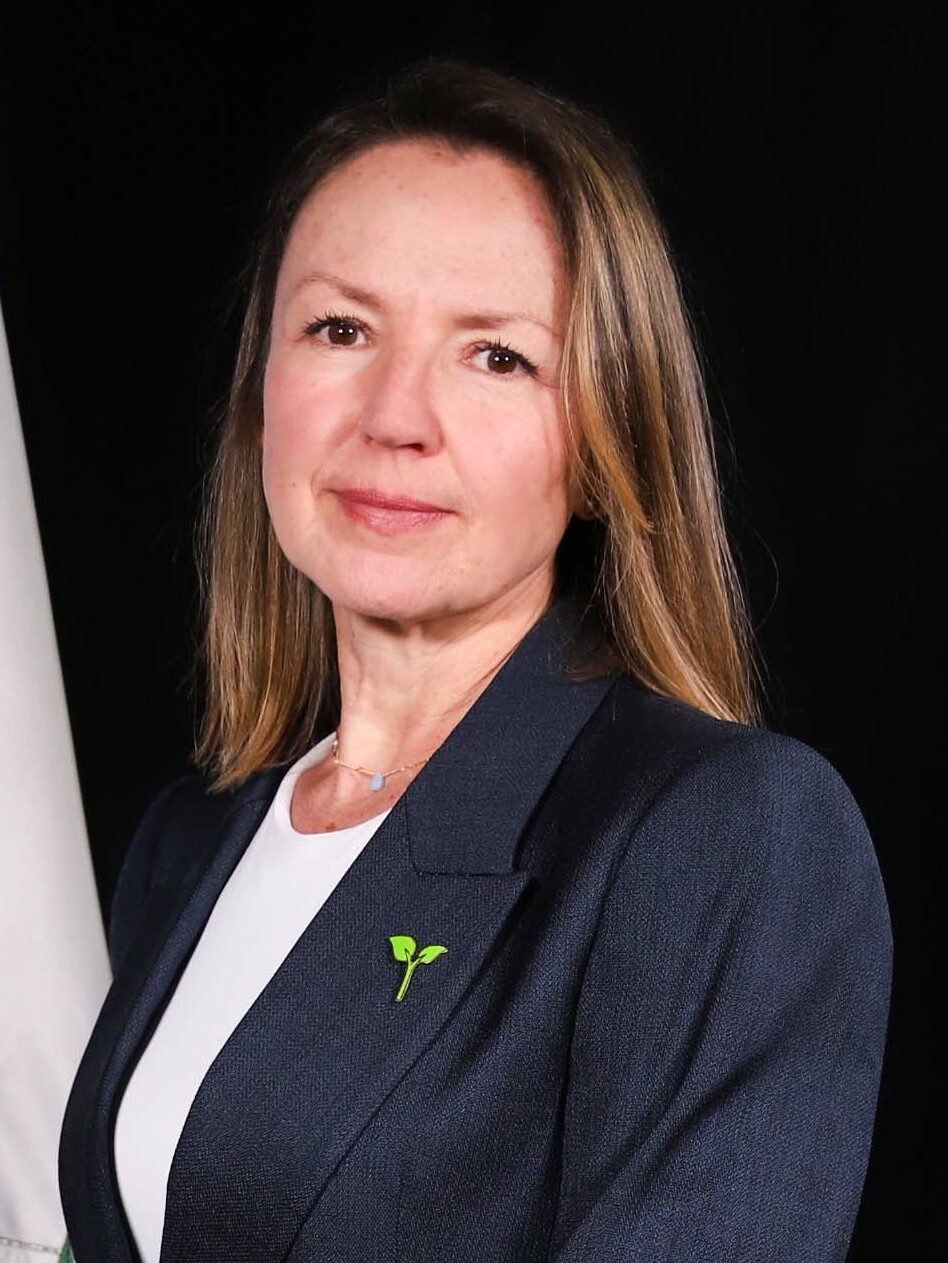
- Official portrait, 2024

Minister of Environment and Natural Resources
- In office 11 April 2024 – 1 September 2026
- President: Bernardo Arévalo
- Preceded by: María José Iturbide
- Succeeded by: Edwin Castellanos

Member of the Congress of Guatemala
- Incumbent
- Assumed office 1 September 2026
- Preceded by: Luis Enrique Ventura
- Constituency: National List
- In office 14 January 2024 – 11 April 2024
- Succeeded by: Luis Enrique Ventura

Personal details
- Born: 20 January 1969 (age 57) Guatemala City, Guatemala
- Party: Roots (since 2026)
- Other political affiliations: Semilla
- Spouse: Andreas Lehnhoff (m. 1994)
- Education: Universidad de San Carlos de Guatemala; Duke University

Ana Patricia Orantes Thomas (born 20 January 1969) is a Guatemalan politician and biologist who serves as a member of the Congress of Guatemala for the National List, a position she has held since September 2026, having previously served briefly in early 2024. A founding member of the Semilla party, she was elected in the 2023 general election and briefly took office before taking a leave of absence to serve as Minister of Environment and Natural Resources in the cabinet of Bernardo Arévalo from 2024 to 2026.

== Biography ==
Orantes was born in Guatemala City, daughter of Megan Thomas, an American anthropologist, and of José Alejandro Orantes Martínez, a Guatemalan trader. She is a biologist graduated from the Universidad de San Carlos de Guatemala; holds a master's degree in Public Policy for Development from Duke University, and obtained postgraduate studies in public administration at the University of Potsdam, Germany. She was appointed head of the Planning and Programming Secretariat of the Presidency in 2006. During this period, she was awarded the Order of Civil Merit by the King Juan Carlos I of Spain.

She has worked as an advisor on environmental issues for several organizations such as the United Nations Development Programme, the Economic Commission for Latin America and the United States Agency for International Development.

Orantes is a cofounder of Movimiento Semilla political party and has held positions within its leadership. She was a member of the National Executive Committee, initially occupying the role of National Organization Secretary, and afterwards that of National Political Program Secretary. Afterward, she coordinated the Semilla party in the Central District (Guatemala City's municipality). She occupied second place for the Semilla parte for the National List constituency for the 2023 legislative election, and she was elected.

== Personal life ==
Orantes is married to architect Andreas Lehnhoff, who served as Minister of the Environment and Natural Resources in the Cabinet of Alejandro Maldonado, who served as president of Guatemala.

The International Commission against Impunity in Guatemala presented a case of espionage and illegal wiretapping in 2019, allegedly requested by the then Minister of Economy, Acisclo Valladares Urruela, against members of the Semilla, including Samuel Pérez Álvarez, Lucrecia Hernández Mack and Ana Patricia Orantes Thomas. The process was archived in 2023. The case was closed by the Attorney General's Office, at the time presided by the Attorney General María Consuelo Porras, in 2023.
