= Museo Miraflores =

Archeological museum in Guatemala City, Guatemala

- Established: 2002
- Location: Guatemala City
- Coordinates: 14°37′13.50″N 90°33′15.79″W
- Type: archaeological museum
- Website: museomiraflores.org.gt

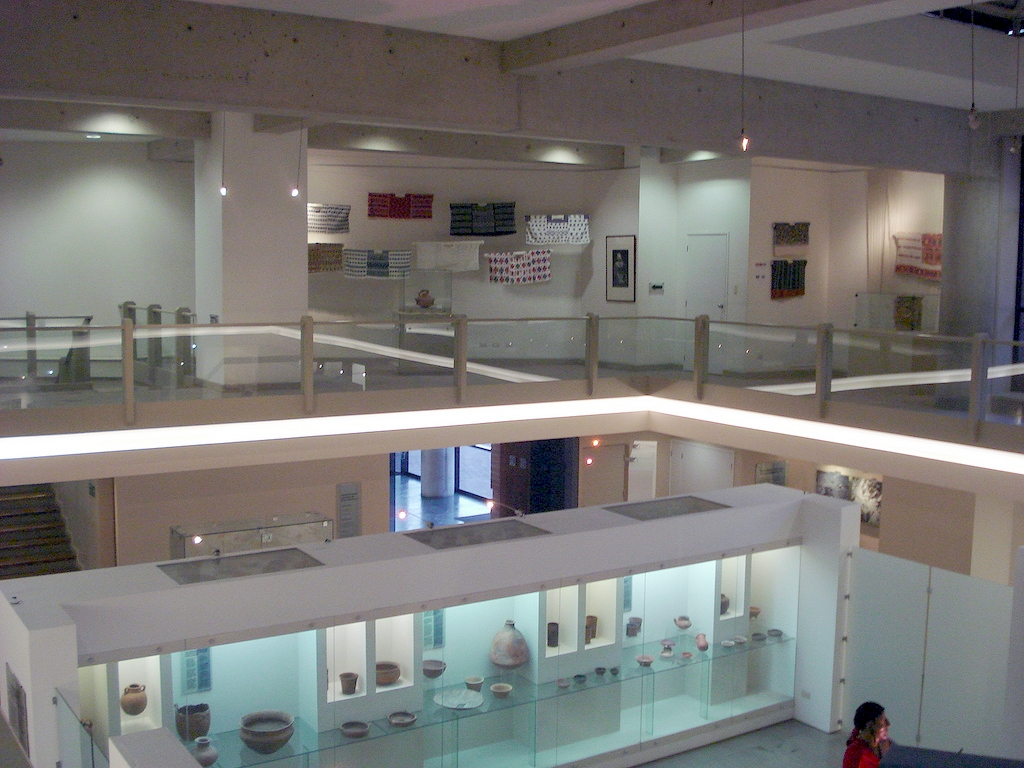
Interior of the museum

The Museo Miraflores is an archaeological museum in Guatemala City, dedicated to the display of artefacts from the ancient Maya city of Kaminaljuyu. The museum is open from Tuesday through to Sunday.

The museum was founded in 2002. The museum is located in Zone 11 of Guatemala City, in the southern part of the area once covered by the Maya city of Kaminaljuyu. It covers an area of approximately 1,200 square metres (13,000 sq ft). Within the grounds of the museum are three preserved mounds.

The modern museum is located in a shopping area outside the city centre. It is privately owned and run by the Fundación Miraflores ("Miraflores Foundation"), a for-profit organisation. The museum is described with labels in Spanish and usually English too.

== Facilities ==
The entrance hall to the museum has a map of the ancient city set into the floor, overlaid with glass marked with the streets of modern Guatemala City. The museum has a permanent exhibition hall, a temporary exhibition hall and a mezzanine with a display of 60 archaeological photographs taken between 1994 and 1996. The museum also has a shop and a cafeteria and is the venue for workshops, conferences and courses.

The mounds within the museum garden are three of twenty-five ancient mounds surviving from Kaminaljuyu that are located on private property. They are Structures B-V-3, B-V-4 and B-V-5; they have been provided with information plaques.

== Collection ==
The collection includes approximately 500 artefacts excavated from Kaminaljuyu. Most of the artefacts were excavated from Kaminaljuyu during the period 1994 to 1996 by the Proyecto Miraflores ("Miraflores Project"). However, not all the artefacts on display have a local origin, and some have come from further afield in Guatemala, especially from pre-Columbian sites that had contact with Kaminaljuyu. Among the artefacts in the collection are a mosaic mask consisting of 19 pieces of jade of unknown provenance and a sculpted stone atlante column. Other collections at the museum include indigenous textiles from the Guatemalan Highlands and monthly displays of modern art.
