= María Fernanda Rivera =

Guatemalan agronomist and politician

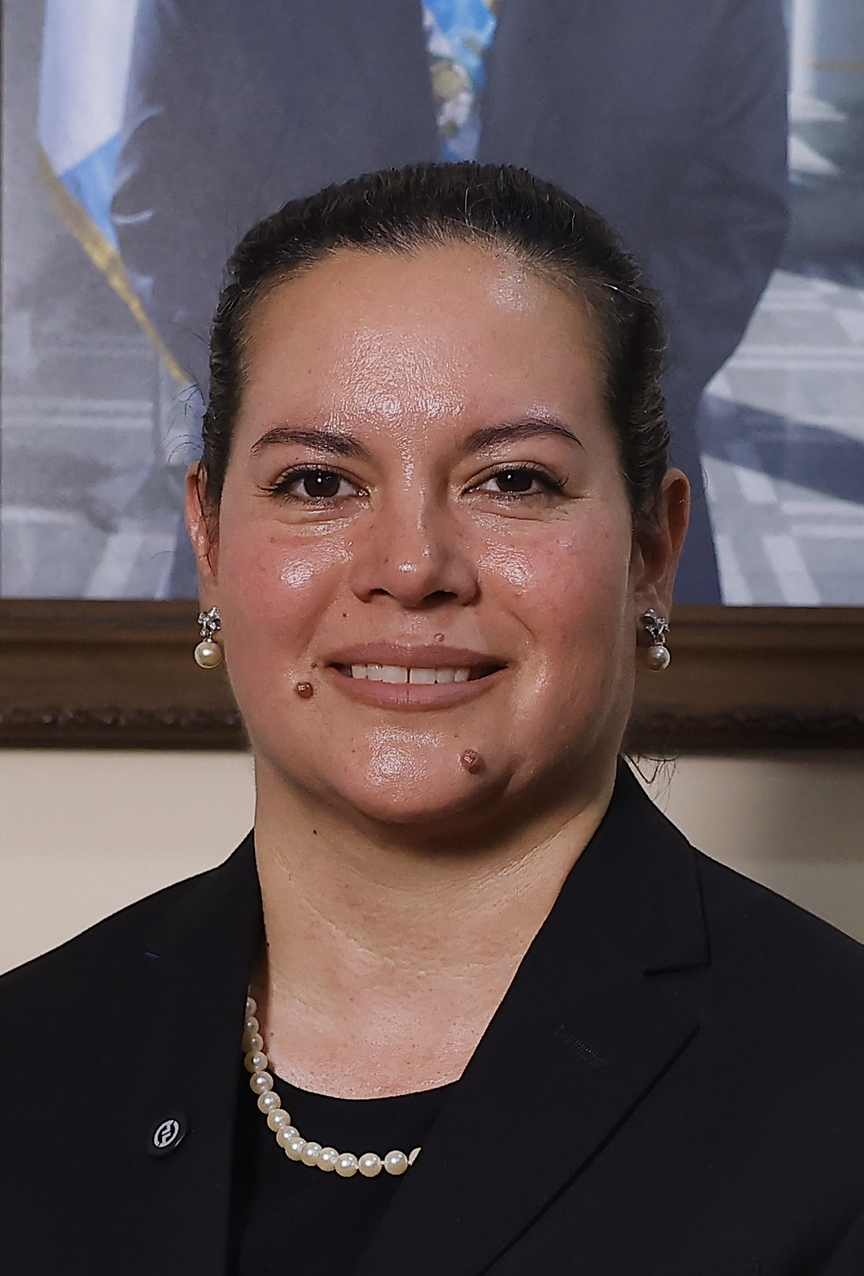
- Rivera in 2025

Minister of Agriculture, Livestock and Food
- Incumbent
- Assumed office 9 May 2025
- President: Bernardo Arévalo
- Preceded by: Maynor Estrada

Personal details
- Party: Independent
- Education: EARTH University; Universidad del Valle de Guatemala; Texas A&I University

María Fernanda Rivera Dávila is a Guatemalan agronomist and politician who has been serving as Minister of Agriculture, Livestock and Food of Guatemala since 2025.

== Education ==
Rivera obtained a degree in agricultural sciences from EARTH University in Costa Rica and subsequently a master’s degree in applied economics and business administration from the Universidad del Valle de Guatemala in partnership with Texas A&M University. She obtained a certificate as a consultant from the Technical Institute for Training and Productivity.

== Career ==
She has had an extensive career in the private sector working on chocolate production projects, rural development, food security and climate change, as well as leading economic integration initiatives, whilst also working at the food and beverage business chamber and the southern coast cocoa producers’ association. Rivera has served as a medical and fire emergency technician with the Volunteer Fire Brigade.

Rivera teaches at Universidad San Carlos de Guatemala and the School of Government.

In 2013, she began working at the Ministry of Agriculture, Livestock and Food, where she became an expert in international trade, director of cooperation, projects and trusts, and an advisor to the Vice-Ministry of Rural Economic Development. She has also worked for international organisations.

On 9 May 2025 President Bernardo Arévalo announced Rivera as the new Minister of Agriculture, Livestock and Food, succeeding Maynor Estrada, and she took office that very same day.
