= Abelardo Pinto =

Guatemalan politician and marketer

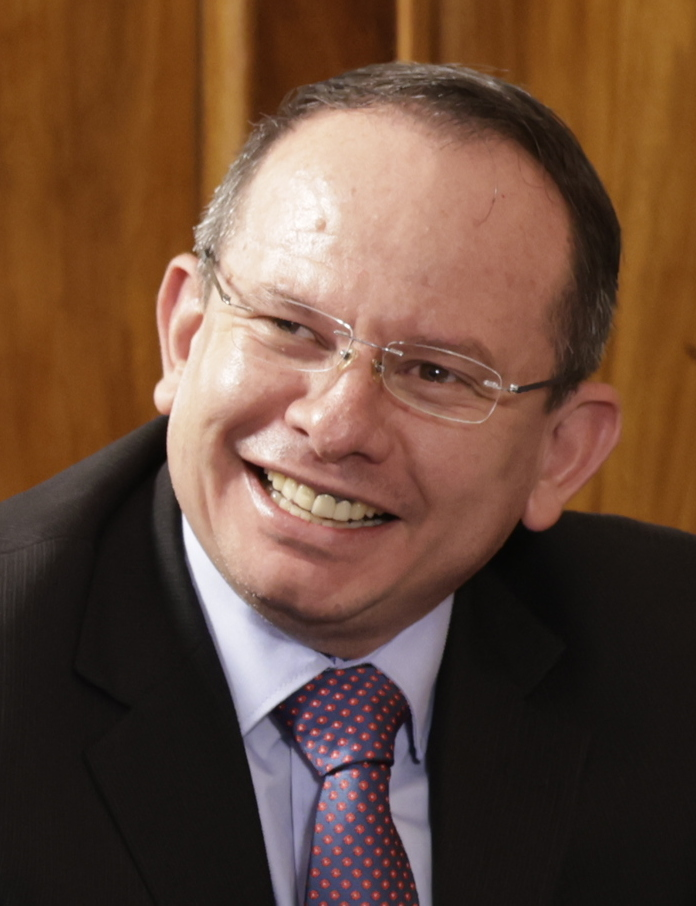

Minister of Social Development
- Incumbent
- Assumed office 15 January 2024
- President: Bernardo Arévalo
- Preceded by: Héctor Melvyn Caná Rivera

Abelardo Pinto is a Guatemalan politician who has been the Minister of Social Development, since January 2024, under the government of Bernardo Arévalo. He got a degree in marketing from Rafael Landívar University. Pinto also served as acting general secretary of the Semilla Movement party from 2023 to 2024.
