= Ministry of Social Development (Guatemala) =

Government ministry of Guatemala

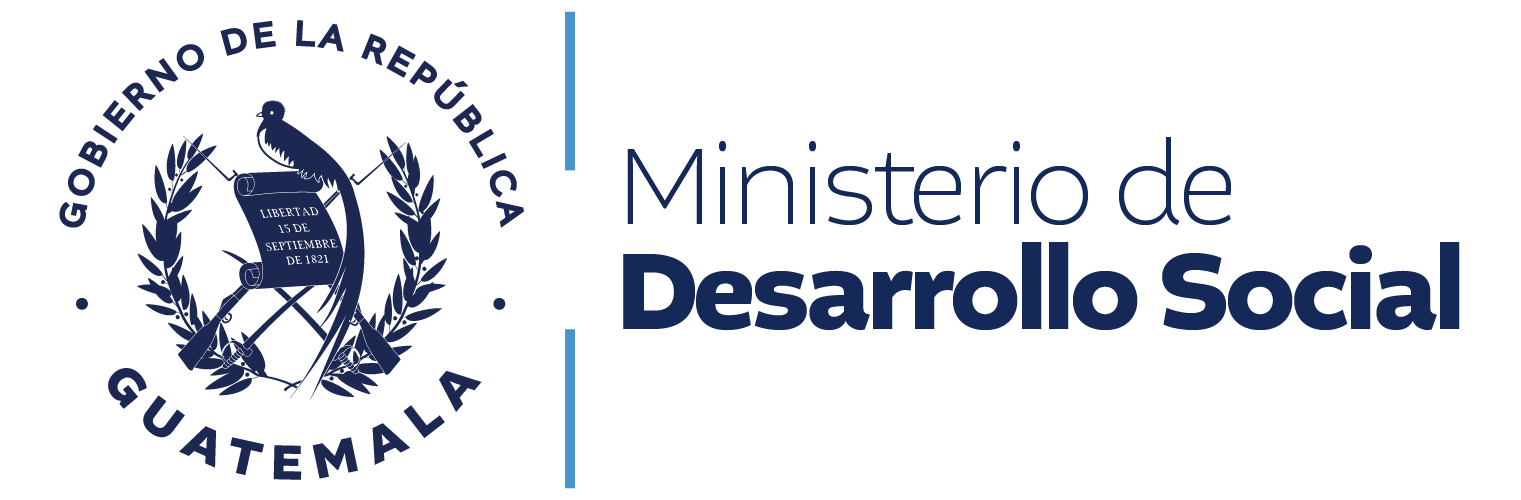
- Ministry logo

Ministry overview
- Formed: January 15, 2012; 14 years ago
- Jurisdiction: Guatemala
- Ministry executive: Abelardo Pinto, Minister
- Website: mides.gob.gt

The Ministry of Social Development (Spanish: Ministerio de Desarrollo Social or MIDES) is a government ministry of Guatemala, headquartered in Zone 9 of Guatemala City. It is responsible for fostering social development policies that aim to improve the quality of life of the population, with emphasis on those who live in poverty and extreme poverty. The current minister of Social Development is Abelardo Pinto.
