= Ministry of Economy (Guatemala) =

Government ministry of Guatemala

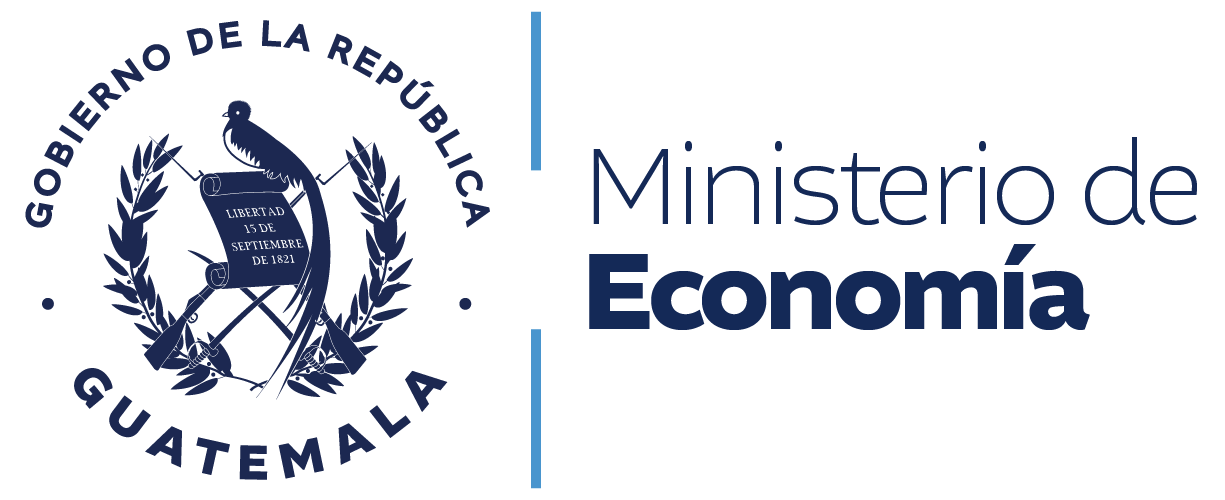
- Ministry logo

Ministry overview
- Formed: December 27, 1944; 81 years ago
- Jurisdiction: Guatemala
- Ministry executive: Gabriela García-Quinn, Minister
- Website: mineco.gob.gt

The Ministry of Economy (Spanish: Ministerio de Economía or MINECO) is a government ministry of Guatemala, headquartered in Zone 1 of Guatemala City. It is responsible for enforcing laws and policies relating to domestic and foreign trade, consumer protection, the promotion of competition, and limiting the operations of monopolies. As of 15 January 2024 the Minister of Economy is Gabriela García-Quinn, who succeeded Luz Mariana Pérez.
