= Ministry of Environment and Natural Resources (Guatemala) =

Government ministry of Guatemala

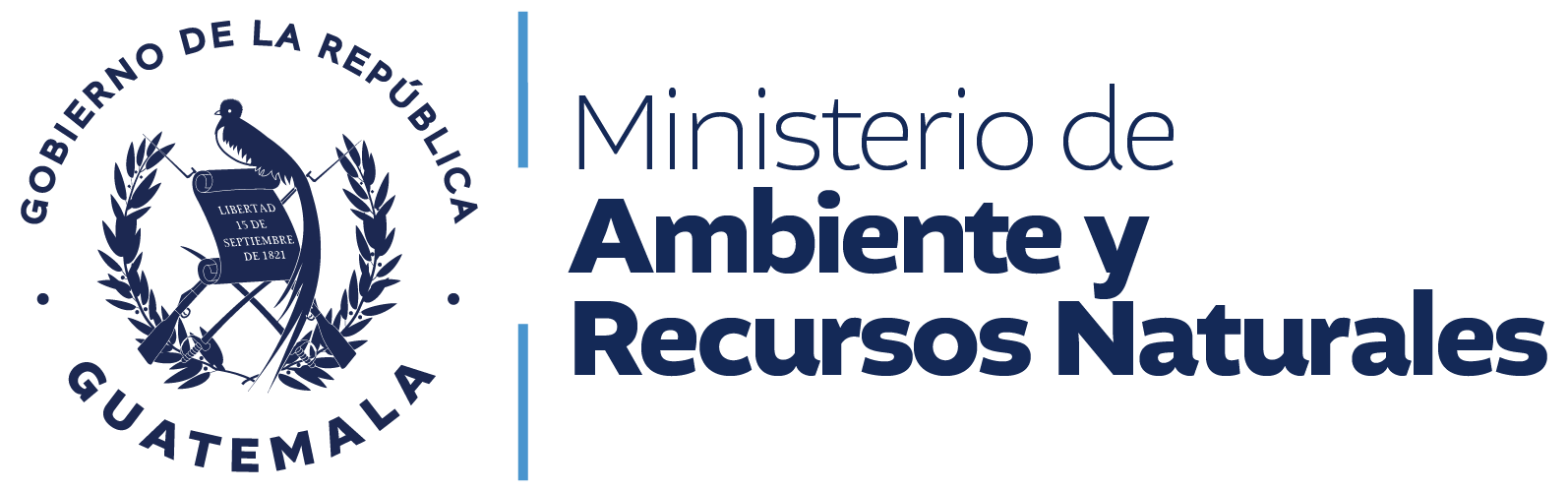
- Ministry logo

Ministry overview
- Formed: December 11, 2000; 25 years ago
- Jurisdiction: Guatemala
- Ministry executive: Patricia Orantes, Minister
- Website: marn.gob.gt

The Ministry of Environment and Natural Resources (Spanish: Ministerio de Ambiente y Recursos Naturales or MARN) is a government ministry of Guatemala, headquartered in Zone 13 of Guatemala City.
