= Ministry of Culture and Sports (Guatemala) =

Government ministry of Guatemala

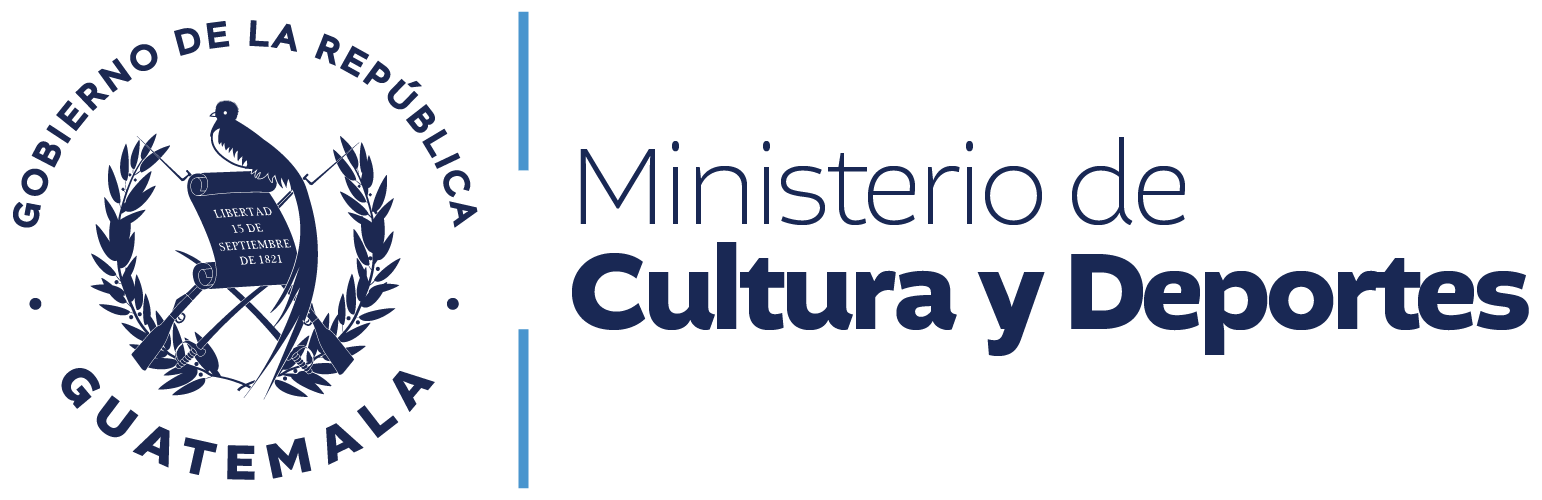
- Ministry logo

Ministry overview
- Formed: January 10, 1986; 40 years ago
- Jurisdiction: Guatemala
- Ministry executive: Liwy Grazioso, Minister
- Website: mcd.gob.gt

The Ministry of Culture and Sports (Spanish: Ministerio de Cultura y Deportes or MCD) is a government ministry of Guatemala, headquartered in Zone 1 of Guatemala City. It is responsible for promoting, developing, and conserving initiatives relating to Guatemalan culture and heritage.

Liwy Grazioso is the current Minister of Culture and Sport.
