= National Palace (Guatemala) =

Government building in Guatemala

Coordinates: 14°38′34.59″N 90°30′47.62″W

Republic of Guatemala National Palace
- Palacio Nacional de la Cultura
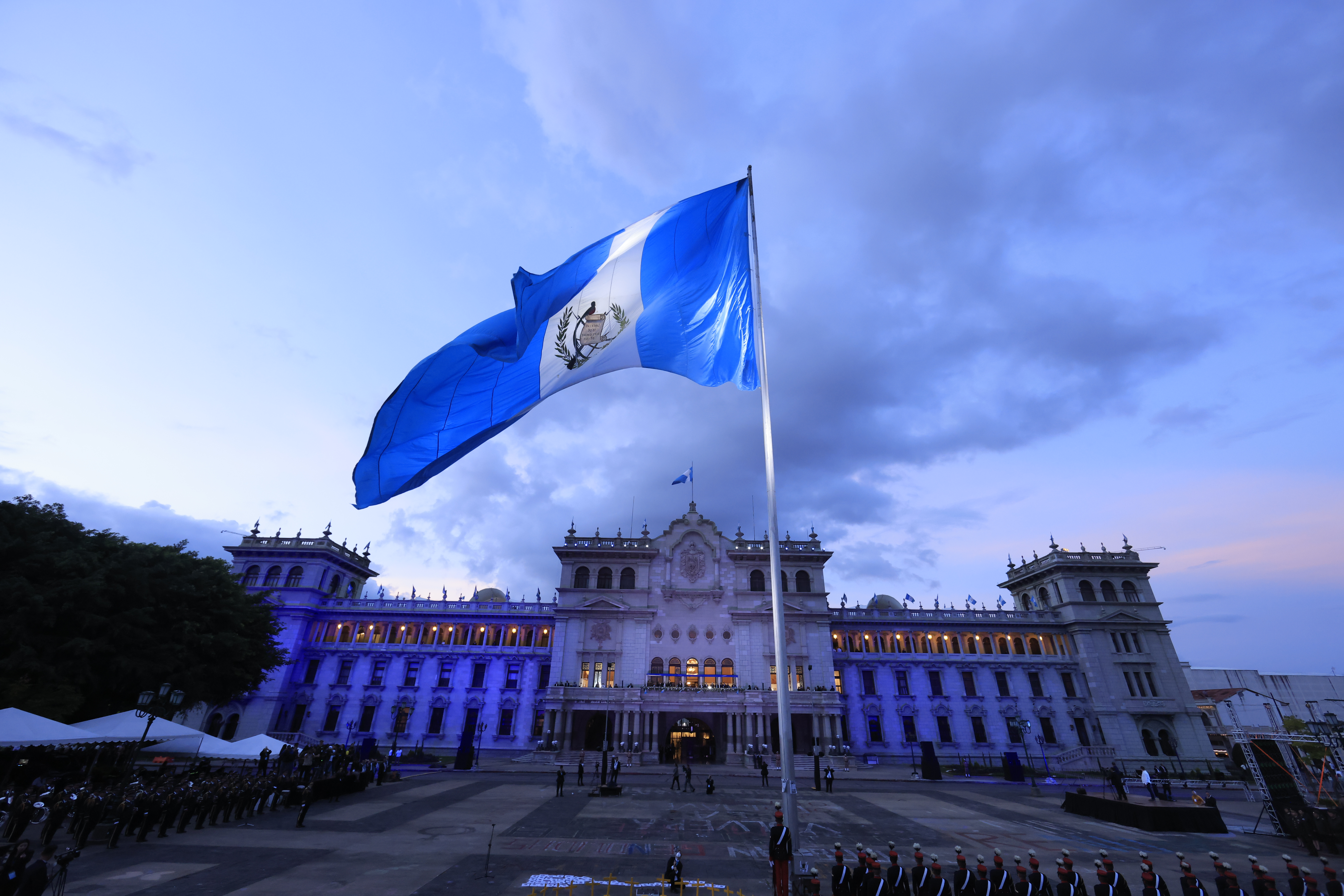
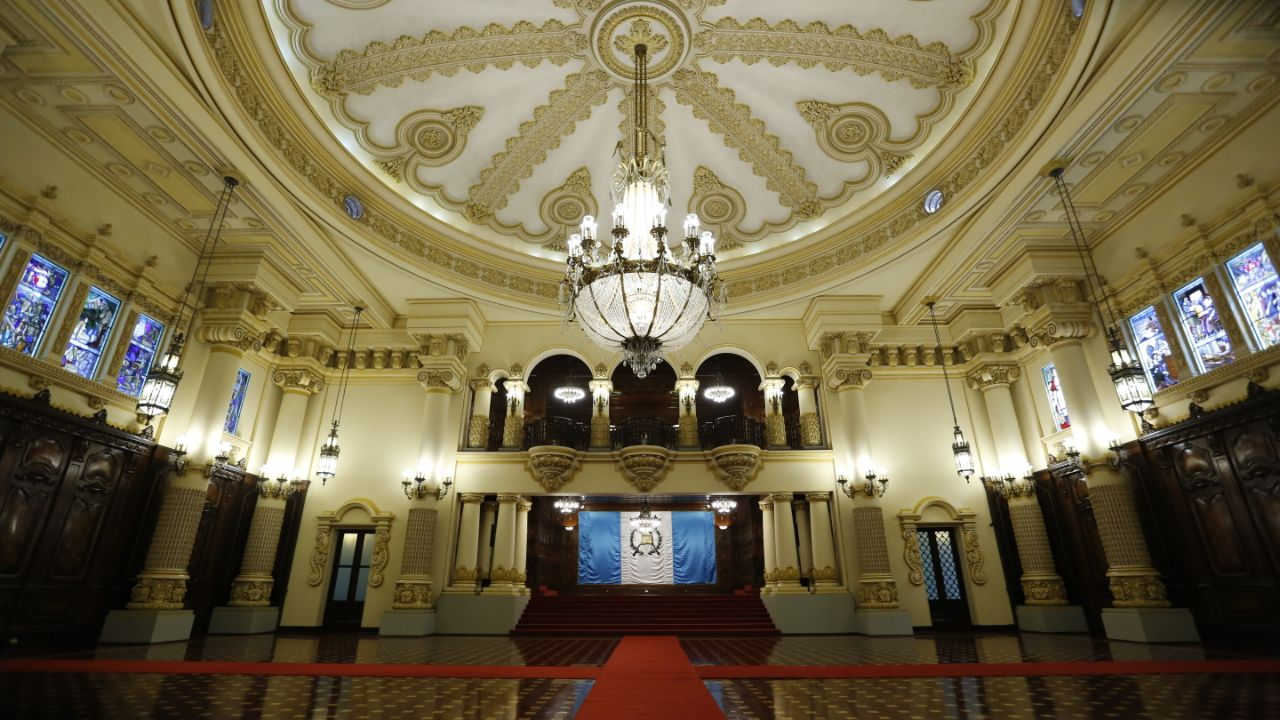
- View of the exterior of the National Palace View of the interior of the National Palace, reception hall
- Interactive map of the Republic of Guatemala National Palace area

General information
- Architectural style: Spanish baroque and Spanish renaissancem
- Location: Guatemala City, Guatemala
- Construction started: 1939
- Completed: 1943
- Inaugurated: November 10, 1943
- Renovated: 2010
- Owner: Guatemalan Government

Design and construction
- Architect: Rafael Pérez de León
- Engineer: Enrique Reyes; Luis Angel Rodas; Arturo Bickford

The Palacio Nacional de la Cultura (National Palace of Culture), also known colloquially as "Palacio Verde", is identified as Guatemala City's symbol in its architectural context. It was the most important building in Guatemala and was the headquarters of the president of Guatemala. The building is the origin of all the roads in the Republic and has a spot known as Kilometro Cero (Kilometer Zero). It is presently a museum and is also used for important acts of the government.

== History ==
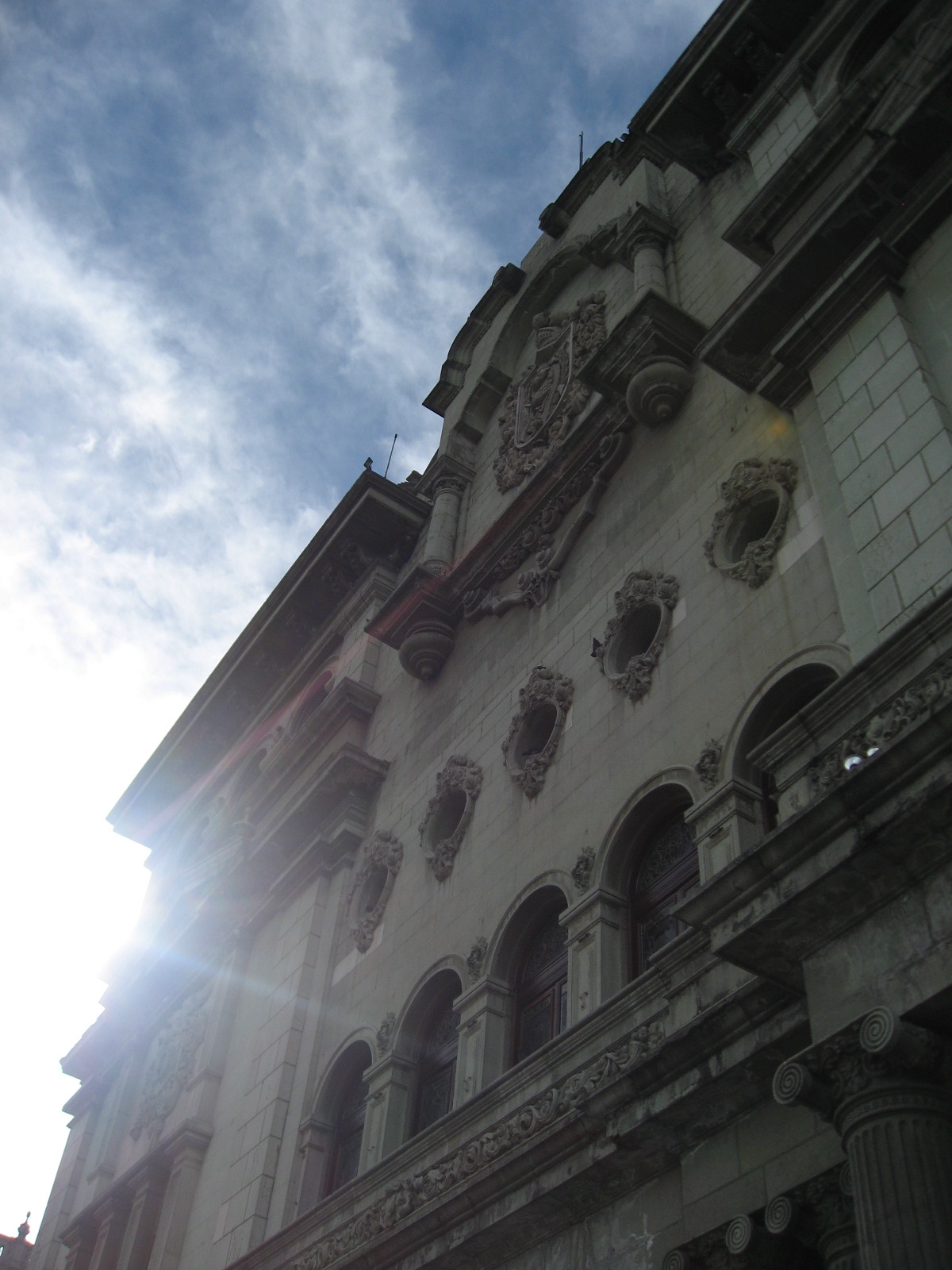
A view of the palace from its front courtyard

In 1528, the first Government House was built in Santiago de Guatemala in the Valle de Almolonga. Then, in 1549, President Alonso López de Cerrato moved the "Audiencia de los Confines" from Gracias a Dios in Honduras to Santiago de Guatemala. In 1761 President Alonso Fernández de Heredia began the construction of a new seat, under the direction of Spanish Captain and engineer Luis Diez de Navarro.

=== Construction ===
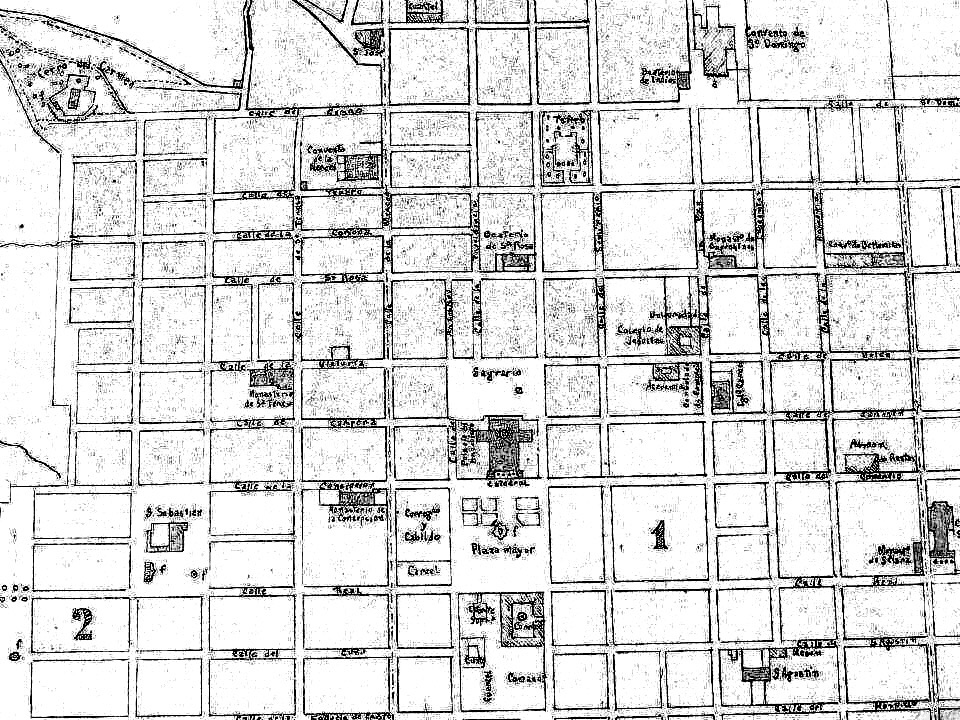
1868 Guatemala City map. On the left side of the Plaza de Armas is the Cabildo -City Hall- and the cárcel -jail- on the lot that later would be used to build the National Palace.

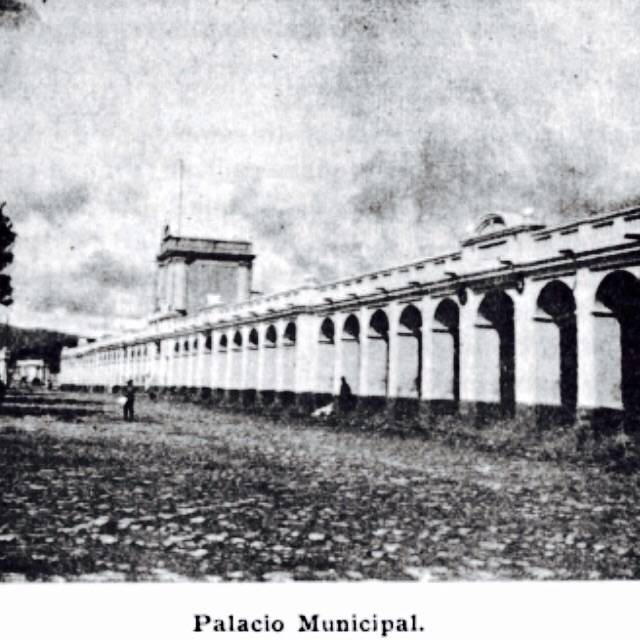
Guatemala City Hall in 1907. Built when the city moved from Santiago de los Caballeros to La Ermita, it was operating until it was destroyed by the 1917 Guatemala earthquake.

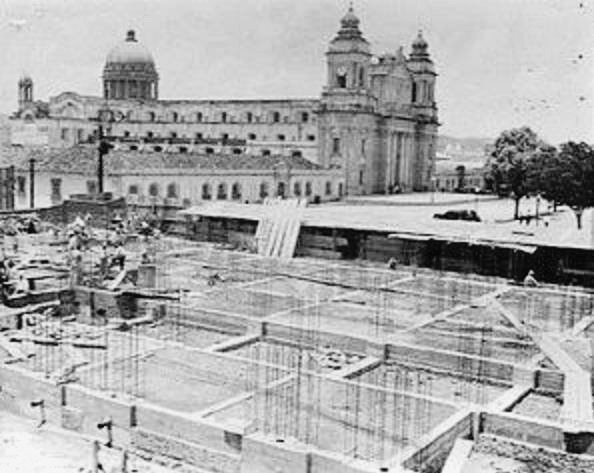
Cathedral of Guatemala city seen from the construction site of the National Palace in 1940.

In celebration of the first century of independence in 1919, President Manuel Estrada Cabrera placed the first stone for a future palace next to the Plaza de Armas. The Italian architect Guido Albani was charged with designing the palace, but it never came to pass due to the collapse of the government soon thereafter. Two years later, in 1921, President Carlos Herrera, with the Centenary very close, ordered the Palacio del Centenario to be built in only three months time with a small budget and few resources. It became popularly known as the Palacio de Cartón (Cardboard Palace). However, in 1925 it was destroyed by a fire.

In 1927 President Lazaro Chacón declared a contest for the design of a new palace. The contest was won by the artist Agustín Iriarte, but this project again never came to be. Finally, in 1932, President General Jorge Ubico published the basis for the design and construction of the palace, and on July 4, 1937, the first stone was placed. The National Palace was built between January 1939 and 1943. On November 10 of that year, the birthday of President Ubico, the present-day Palace was opened.

=== 1976 earthquake ===
The building survived the earthquake of February 4 of 1976, a magnitude 7.5 on the Richter scale.

=== 1982 coup and special jurisdiction tribunals ===
On March 23, 1982, young officers from the Guatemalan Army deposed President Fernando Romeo Lucas García and replaced him with General Efraín Ríos Montt, who had been director of the Guatemala Military Academy while those young officers were cadets.

On June 30, 1982, Ríos Montt, in a speech called "We are willing to let honesty and justice reign" ("Estamos dispuestos que reine la honestidad y la justicia"), told the Guatemalan people that the government had realized that there were many Guatemalans that were afraid of being killed and that therefore did not apply for the amnesty his government issued in late March. Because of that, he said, the government was going to fight communist guerrillas by any means they wanted, but that they also were going to use open trials. Rios Montt said that in order to accomplish that he had set up "special jurisdiction tribunals" which would judge leftist criminals and that they were going to apply capital punishment to those proven guilty.

These secret tribunals, whose members were appointed by the president but were unknown to the Guatemalan people, performed fast and drastic trials, in parallel to the judiciary system of the country. In the end, 15 people were executed less than a month after they had been captured.

The special tribunals were directly under control of the Defense Secretary, general Óscar Humberto Mejía Víctores, and had their headquarters in the National Palace and lasted until Mejia Víctores himself led a coup d'état that deposed General Ríos Montt on August 8, 1983.

== See also ==
- History of Guatemala
- Guatemala Civil War

== Notes and references ==
=== Bibliography ===
- Hernández, Oswaldo (2013). "Tribunales de fuero especial: La justicia que fue de los generales". Plaza Pública (in Spanish). Guatemala.
