= Ministry of Education (Guatemala) =

Government ministry of Guatemala

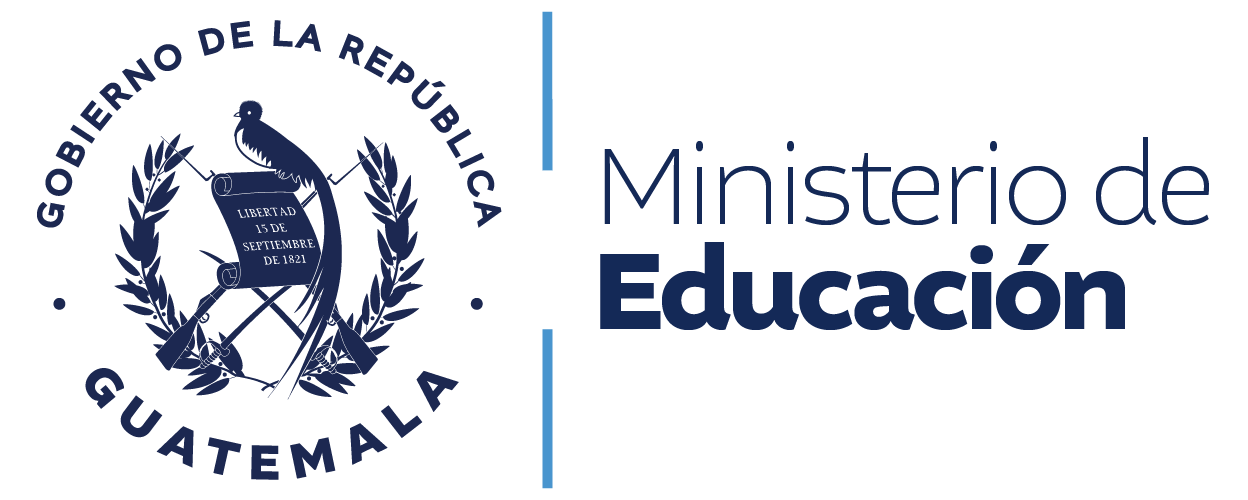
- Ministry logo

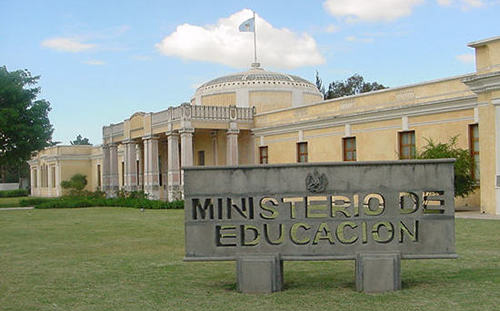
- Headquarters

Ministry overview
- Formed: July 18, 1872; 154 years ago
- Jurisdiction: Guatemala
- Ministry executive: Anabella Giracca, Minister
- Website: mineduc.gob.gt

The Ministry of Education (Spanish: Ministerio de Educación or MINEDUC) is a government ministry of Guatemala, headquartered in Zone 10 of Guatemala City.
