= Guatemala–Turkey relations =

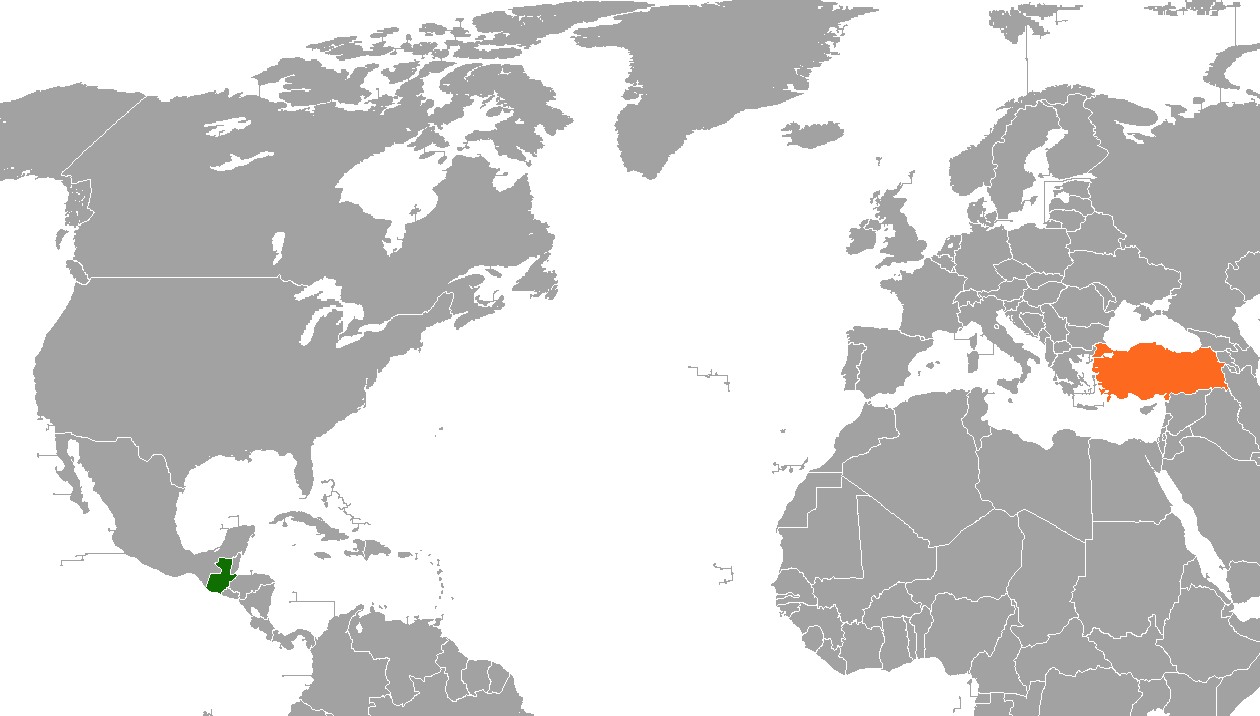
- Guatemala: Turkey

Guatemala and Turkey maintain bilateral relations. Guatemala has an embassy in Ankara since April 19, 2017. Turkey has an embassy in Guatemala City since 2015.

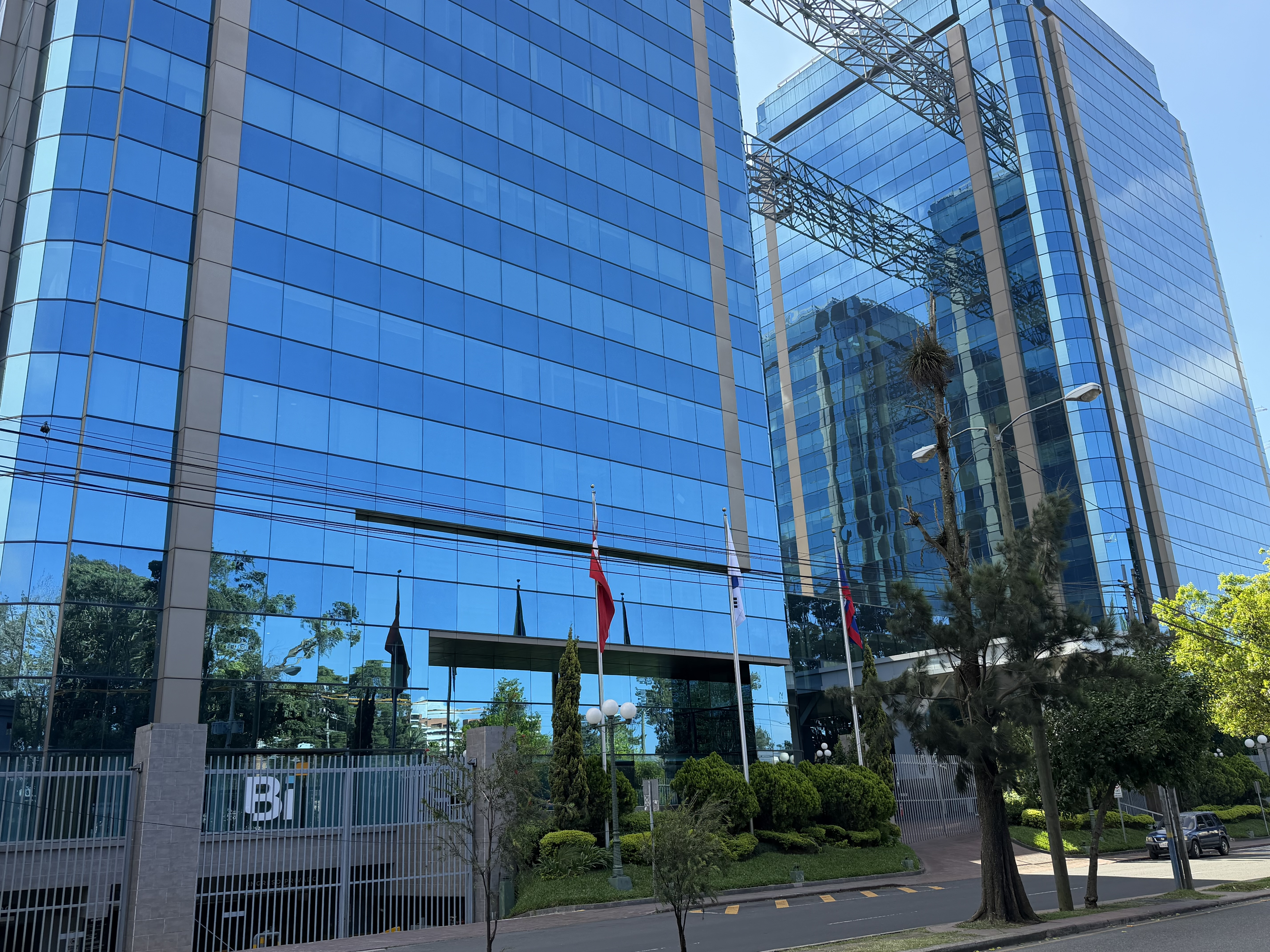
Building hosting the Embassy of Turkey in Guatemala City

== Official visits ==
Guest	Host	Place of visit	Date of visit
(Turkey) Minister of Foreign Affairs Mevlüt Çavuşoğlu	(Guatemala) Minister of Foreign Affairs Carlos Raúl Morales	First Turkey-SICA Foreign Ministers Forum, Guatemala City	February, 2015
(Guatemala) Minister of Foreign Affairs Carlos Raúl Morales	(Turkey) Minister of Foreign Affairs Mevlüt Çavuşoğlu	Second Turkey-SICA Foreign Ministers Forum, Istanbul and Ankara	February 19–20, 2017
(Turkey) Minister of Foreign Affairs Mevlüt Çavuşoğlu	(Guatemala) Minister of Foreign Affairs Sandra Jovel	Third Turkey-SICA Foreign Ministers Forum, Guatemala City	May 20–21, 2019

== Economic relations ==
Trade volume between the two countries was US$63.5 million in 2019 (Turkish exports/imports: US$53.5/10 million).

== See also ==
- Foreign relations of Guatemala
- Foreign relations of Turkey
