= Gladys Maritza Ruiz de Vielman =

Ambassador of Guatemala

Marithza Ruiz de Vielman
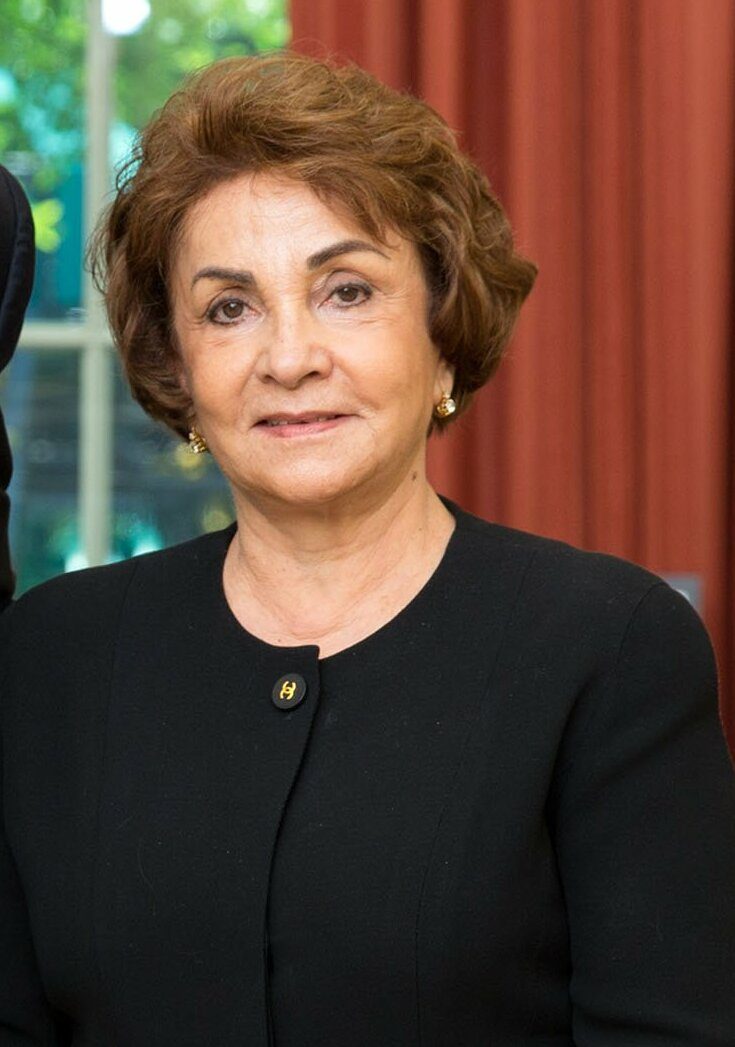

Guatemalan Ambassador to Netherlands
- In office 2017–2020
- President: Jimmy Morales
- Preceded by: Luis Raúl Estévez López
- Succeeded by: Jorge Skinner-Klée Arenales

Guatemalan Ambassador to United States
- In office 27 June 2016 – July, 2017
- President: Jimmy Morales
- Preceded by: Julio Ligorría
- Succeeded by: Manuel Alfredo Espina Pinto

Guatemalan Ambassador to United Kingdom
- In office 2000–2003
- President: Alfonso Portillo
- Succeeded by: José Alberto Sandoval Cojulum

Minister of Foreign Affairs
- In office 27 January 1994 – 17 July 1995
- President: Ramiro de León Carpio
- Preceded by: Arturo Fajardo Maldonado
- Succeeded by: Alejandro Maldonado Aguirre

Personal details
- Born: Gladys Maritza Ruiz Sanchez; 30 August 1945 (age 81) Retalhuleu, Guatemala
- Education: Rafael Landivar University (Law)
- Occupation: Diplomat

Gladys Maritza Ruiz de Vielman (born August 30, 1945) is a Guatemalan attorney, diplomat and politician who served as Guatemala's Minister of Foreign Affairs from 27 January 1994 to 17 July 1995 under the government of Ramiro de León Carpio. She worked as a lawyer and law school lecturer and represented Guatemala as the Ambassador to the United States and also served as the Ambassador of Guatemala to the Netherlands.

== Education ==
Ruiz de Vielman received her law degree from the Rafael Landivar University in 1973 where she specialized in international, commercial and family law. She studied abroad in the United States, Brazil and France. Her first language is Spanish and she also speaks English, Portuguese, and French.

== Career ==
=== Law ===
After graduating from law school, Ruiz de Vielman started her own law firm. Her firm's most frequent clients were the Guatemalan government as well as the Guatemalan private sector. She has worked as a lawyer on behalf of a number of other Latin American countries in hearings before the World Trade Organization over trade disputes.

=== Diplomacy ===
Ruiz de Vielman's diplomatic career began in 1986. She has served as permanent representative of Guatemala to the International Coffee Organization, International Sugar Organization, and the International Maritime Organization. She is accredited by the International Court of Justice, an accreditation she earned after representing Guatemala in a case against Belize concerning territorial rights.

After holding the position of Minister of Foreign Affairs (1994-1995), Ruiz de Vielman served as the Ambassador for Guatemala in the United Kingdom and Northern Ireland from 2000 to 2003. She was then appointed to represent Guatemala as the country’s Ambassador to the United States from 2016 to 2017. Her appointment, which came after the position had been vacant for over six months, broke barriers as she was the first woman to represent Guatemala in the United States. After her time in the United States, she was appointed to be Guatemala’s Ambassador to the Kingdom of the Netherlands.
