= Gert Rosenthal =

Guatemalan diplomat

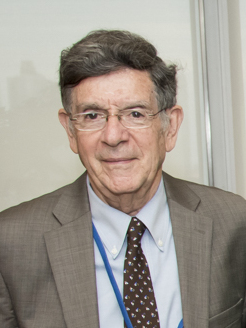
- Rosenthal in 2017

Minister of Foreign Affairs of Guatemala
- In office 25 July 2006 – 14 January 2008
- President: Óscar Berger
- Preceded by: Jorge Briz
- Succeeded by: Haroldo Rodas

Secretary (Minister) of National Planning of Guatemala
- In office 1973–1974
- In office 1969–1970

Permanent Representative of Guatemala to the United Nations
- In office 14 January 2008 – 8 September 2014
- Succeeded by: Fernando Carrera
- In office 22 March 1999 – 25 July 2004

United Nations Executive Secretary for the Economic Commission for Latin America and the Caribbean
- In office January 1988 – December 1997
- Preceded by: Norberto González
- Succeeded by: José Antonio Ocampo

Personal details
- Born: 24 September 1935 (age 91) Amsterdam, The Netherlands
- Education: Universidad de San Carlos de Guatemala; University of California at Berkeley
- Profession: Diplomat and Economist

Gert Rosenthal Königsberger (born 11 September 1935) is a Guatemalan diplomat who served as Guatemala's Minister of Foreign Affairs from 25 July 2006 to 14 January 2008 under the government of Óscar Berger.

== Early life, education and career ==
He was born in Amsterdam to a German father and Guatemalan mother and came to Guatemala at the age of three. After secondary education in Guatemala, he studied in the United States and received a BA and an MA in economics from the University of California, Berkeley. He then pursued further studies in economics at San Carlos University in Guatemala City.

He entered government service in 1960 as a part-time economist at the National Planning Secretariat. In 1964 he was appointed representative of Guatemala on the Executive Council of the Central American Common Market, rising to Assistant to the Secretary-General of the Common Market's Secretariat in 1967. Between 1969 and 1970 he headed the National Planning Secretariat, a ministerial-level position. In 1971 he was named a fellow at the Adlai Stevenson Institute for International Affairs in Chicago, United States. Between 1972 and 1973 he directed a project in Guatemala for the United Nations Conference on Trade and Development (UNCTAD), intended to promote the Central American Common Market. In 1973-74 he again headed the National Planning Secretariat.

In 1998, he was a member of the Oversight Commission of the Guatemalan Peace Accords.

== Tenure at United Nations ==
Between 1974 and 1985 he was the Director of the Mexico-based subregional office of the United Nations Economic Commission for Latin America and the Caribbean (ECLAC). In 1985, was promoted to Deputy Executive Secretary at ECLAC's headquarters in Santiago, Chile, and, in 1988, to Executive Secretary, with responsibility for the entire Latin America and Caribbean region.

In 1999, he was appointed Permanent Representative of Guatemala to the United Nations, where he remained until 2004. In August 2006, following the resignation of Jorge Briz, President Óscar Berger appointed him Minister of Foreign Affairs, a position where he remained until the end of Berger's term on January 14, 2008. In April 2008 he was re-appointed Permanent Representative of Guatemala to the United Nations.

Rosenthal was President of the Executive Board of UNDP/UNFPA (United Nations Development Programme / United Nations Population Fund) in 2001, President of the United Nations Economic and Social Council in 2003, Vice-President of the Executive Board of UNICEF in 2008, Vice-President of the Peacebuilding Commission in 2011 and Chair of the Fifth Committee on two occasions (2001 and 2011).

In 2011, Guatemala was selected for a two-year rotating term as a non-permanent member of the Security Council for the 2012-2013 term. Guatemala was unanimously supported for this role and many UN officials saw this as a recognition of Gert Rosenthal as among the most respected diplomats at the UN. In October 2012, he was the President of the United Nations Security Council.

Currently Rosenthal is the Chair of the Advisory Group of Experts on the Review of the United Nations Peacebuilding Architecture started in January 2015.
