= Carlos Raúl Morales =

Guatemalan diplomat and former government official

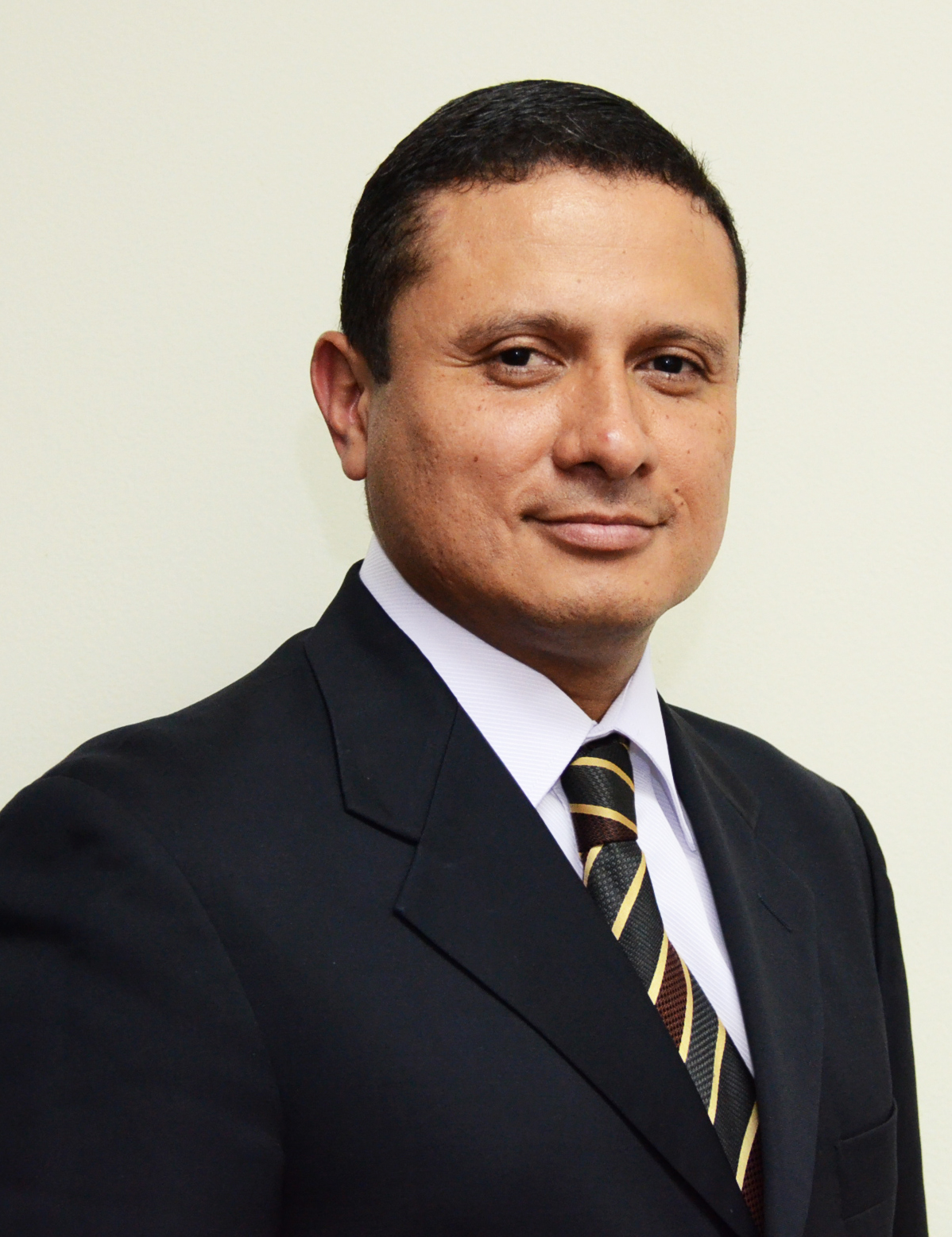

Minister of Foreign Affairs of Guatemala
- In office 18 September 2014 – 27 August 2017
- President: Otto Pérez Molina; Alejandro Maldonado; Jimmy Morales
- Preceded by: Fernando Carrera
- Succeeded by: Sandra Jovel

Personal details
- Born: 7 October 1970 (age 55) Chiquimula, Guatemala
- Profession: Diplomat

Carlos Raúl Morales Moscoso (born 7 October 1970) is a Guatemalan diplomat and former government official who served as Guatemala's Minister of Foreign Affairs from September 2014 to August 2017 under the governments of Jimmy Morales, Alejandro Maldonado and Otto Pérez Molina.

== Career ==
=== Vice Minister of Foreign Affairs ===
Due to the foreign policy of Guatemala towards Belize, he left office in November 2011, so he could continue serving as the executive secretary of the Commission of Belize of Guatemala, until this unit was shut down by president Pérez Molina in February 2012.

After that, he assumed the office of the vice minister again, and held the position until his nomination as minister. During his time in office, he handled the bilateral and multilateral agenda, among other tasks.

=== Minister of Foreign Affairs ===
Morales was sworn by President Otto Pérez Molina as the Foreign Affairs Minister on 18 September 2014. He replaced Fernando Carrera, who was designated as the Ambassador to the United Nations. Morales was the third foreign affairs minister under Perez Molina's administration.

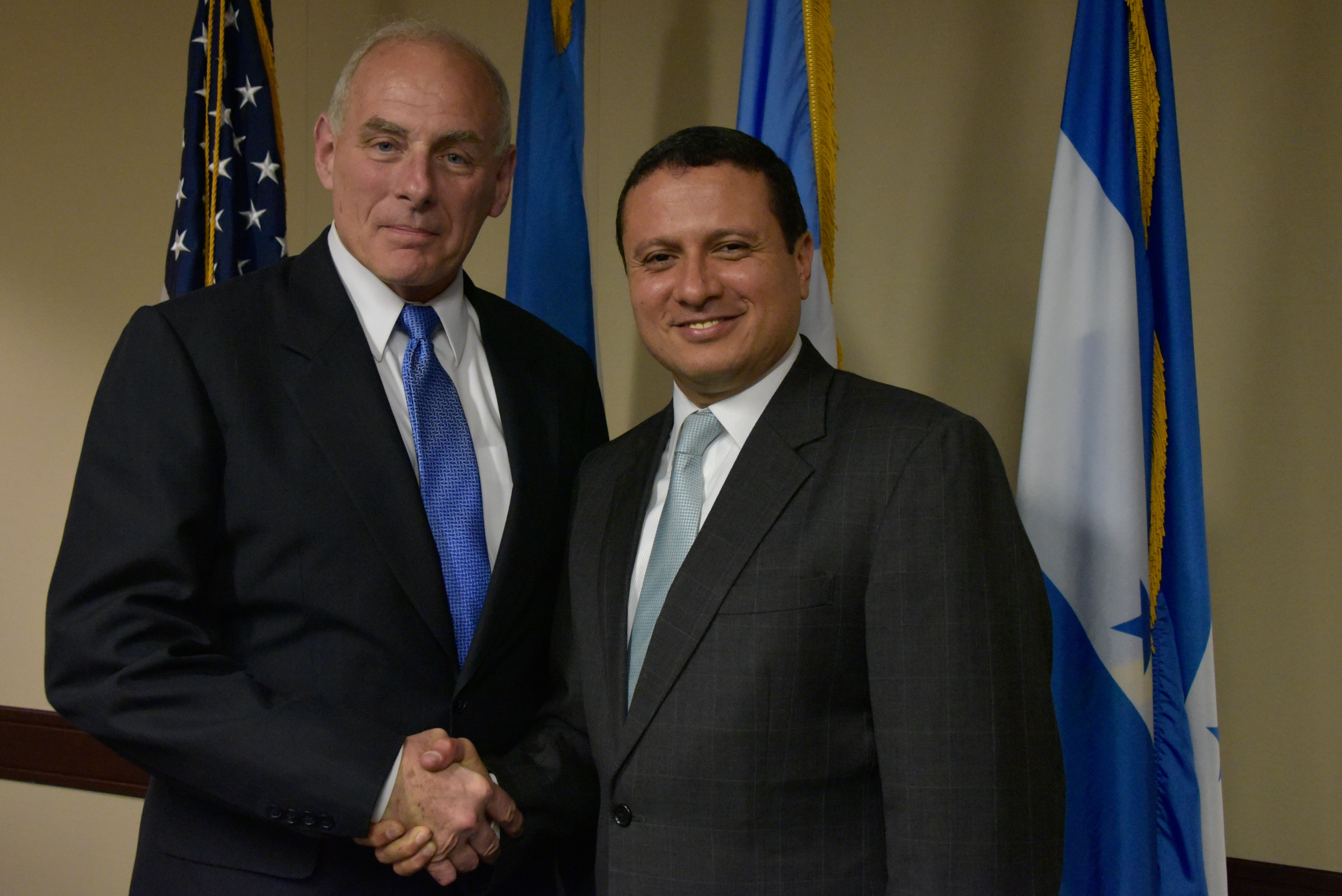
Morales meets with U.S. Secretary of Homeland Security John Kelly in Washington, D.C., on May 18, 2017.

Following the political turmoils in 2015, President Pérez Molina resigned, and his vice president, Alejandro Maldonado, took his place to lead the government until the end of the presidential period, due on January, 16th, 2016. Under the new administration, the cabinet was summoned for full review. After the first week of the transition government, minister Morales was confirmed to remain in office.

And on 16 January 2016, minister Morales was confirmed to continue in his post under the new administration of president Jimmy Morales. This made Carlos Raul Morales the first foreign affairs minister to serve three presidents.

In August, 2017, a new political crisis emerged, as the rumors that president Morales had the intentions to remove commissioner Iván Velásquez from the International Commission Against Impunity in Guatemala (CICIG). On such a short notice, a presidential trip to the headquarters of the UN took place on 25 August 2017. The topics in the agenda remained unknown until a meeting with Secretary-General of the UN, António Guterres, took place on the same day. The Government of Guatemala did not confirm nor denied the fact that the removal of Iván Velásquez had taken place during the meeting.

On 27 August, president Morales issued an executive order declaring commissioner Iván Velásquez "non grato", and expelled him from the country. As Minister Morales refused to sign the executive order, he was removed from office along with one of his vice ministers, Carlos Ramiro Martínez. In the afternoon, news was known of the resignation of another vice minister of foreign affairs, Anamaría Diéguez.

== Personal life ==
Morales was born to José Guillermo Morales Silva and Dora Amelia Moscoso in Chiquimula, although he grew up in the town of Morales in Izabal Department. He frequently visits his hometown.

== See also ==
- List of foreign ministers in 2017
