= Abularach =

Abularach (Arabic: ابوالعرج Abu l-rag, Abou l-Rach or Abu l-raj; or Hebrew: אבולעראך Abularach)It is a Bethlehem surname whose etymological origin is in the Arabic language. often found among Arab Christians.

== Etymology ==
Etymologically, the surname is composed of the Arabic words:

- Abu or Abou (أبو abū), literally "father" but also carrying the meaning "owner",
- al or el (الـ), or simply l if the preceding word ends with a vowel, to which it attaches itself, is the definite article equivalent to "the", and
- Araj or 3raj (عرج a3raj), literally "limp" but also carrying the meaning "as a symbol of resilience and strength".

Together they form Abou l-araj or Abu l-3raj, rendered as a single word, Abularach, possibly meaning "Father [of] the strong"

== Notable people ==
- Gabby Abularach, American musician
- Jorge Briz Abularach (born 1955), Guatemalan politician
- Rodolfo Abularach (1933–2020), Guatemalan artist of Palestinian descent
