= Francisco Villagran =

Francisco Villagrán is the name of:

- Francisco Villagrán Kramer (1927–2011), vice president of Guatemala, 1978–1980
- Francisco Villagrán de León (1954–2024), Guatemalan diplomat and academic, son of the above
- Francisco Villagrán Muñoz, Guatemalan politician, affiliated with the Guatemalan National Revolutionary Unity
