= Francisco Villagrán de León =

Guatemalan diplomat and academic (1954–2024)

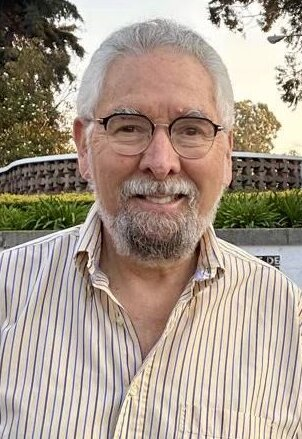

Special Envoy of the President of Guatemala
- In office 20 February 2024 – 18 May 2024
- President: Bernardo Arévalo

Ambassador of Guatemala to the United States
- In office 2012–2013
- President: Otto Pérez Molina
- Preceded by: Julio Martini Herrera
- Succeeded by: Julio Ligorría

Ambassador of Guatemala to the United States
- In office 2008–2011
- President: Álvaro Colom
- Preceded by: Guillermo Castillo Villacorta
- Succeeded by: Julio Martini Herrera

Personal details
- Born: 29 March 1954 Guatemala City, Guatemala
- Died: 18 May 2024 (aged 70) Washington D.C., United States
- Party: Movimiento Semilla
- Parent: Francisco Villagrán Kramer (father)
- Education: Rafael Landívar University; George Washington University

José Francisco Villagrán de León (29 March 1954 – 18 May 2024) was a Guatemalan diplomat and academic.

Villagrán de León held positions as Guatemala's ambassador to the Organization of American States, the United Nations, Canada, Germany, Norway, Denmark and the United States. He was also appointed Vice-Minister of Foreign Affairs in 1986 and, from February 2024 until his death, served as a presidential adviser and envoy under President Bernardo Arévalo.

== Early life and education ==
Villagrán de León was born in Guatemala City on 29 March 1954 to Francisco Villagrán Kramer (Vice-President of Guatemala from July 1978 to September 1980) and Alba Ruth de León Méndez. He earned a bachelor's degree in law and social sciences from Rafael Landívar University and, later, a master's degree from Georgetown University in the U.S.

== Diplomatic career ==
During the 1980s, he worked in the Embassy of Guatemala to the United States. He was later appointed Guatemala's alternate representative to the Organization of American States (OAS). He briefly served as Vice-Minister of Foreign Affairs in 1986 before returning to the OAS as his country's permanent representative, a position he held from 1987 to 1988 and then again from 2005 to 2008. He was also assigned to OAS electoral observation missions in Peru and Honduras.

From 1988 to 1991, he served as permanent representative to the United Nations in New York City, and to the United Nations Office at Geneva from 2013 to 2015. He was also ambassador to Canada (1994–1998), Norway and Denmark (1998–2000) and Germany (2000–2001). He held the position of ambassador to the United States on two occasions: 2008 to 2011 and 2012 to 2013.

Villagrán de León remained in the U.S. and secured a teaching position at George Washington University.

Villagrán de León was also a founding member of the Movimiento Semilla political movement in his home country.

During the 2023 general election and the political crisis that ensued in its wake, Villagrán began to advise Bernardo Arévalo – first, when he was Movimiento Semilla's presidential candidate and, later, as president-elect – in his communications with U.S. politicians to argue his case.

When Arévalo was sworn in as president in January 2024, there was speculation that Villagrán would be appointed minister of foreign affairs or ambassador to the U.S.; ultimately, however, Arévalo assigned him the position of "presidential adviser and envoy" in February 2024. Villagrán was acknowledged as one of Arévalo's closest advisers and was given credit for organizing Arévalo's first foreign trip to Europe.

== Death ==
Villagrán died at a hospital in Washington, D.C., in the early morning of 18 May 2024. He was 70. Villagrán de León had been hospitalized after falling in a restaurant the previous day. President Arévalo announced the news on social media, describing his friend as "one of the most brilliant diplomats in [Guatemala's] history".
