= Rodrigo Rosenberg Marzano =

Guatemalan attorney murdered in 2010

- Born: November 28, 1960; Guatemala City, Guatemala
- Died: May 10, 2009 (aged 48); Guatemala City, Guatemala
- Cause of death: Gunshot wounds to torso and head.
- Education: Rafael Landívar University
- Occupation: Attorney
- Children: Four

Rodrigo Rosenberg Marzano (November 28, 1960 – May 10, 2009) was a Guatemalan attorney. Before his death, Rosenberg recorded a video message saying if he were murdered, Álvaro Colom Caballeros, President of Guatemala, Gustavo Alejos, Sandra Torres de Colom, and Gregorio Valdés would have been directly responsible. His subsequent killing caused a national uproar. After an investigation by a United Nations commission, officials declared that Rosenberg had arranged his own death and had contacted cousins of his former wife, Francisco José Ramón Valdés Paiz and José Estuardo Valdés Paiz, to hire a hitman.

Carlos Castresana, the head of the International Commission against Impunity in Guatemala (CICIG), who headed the investigation at that time, emphasized that this was a provisional hypothesis. The cousins accused were sent to jail for complicity in a hearing behind closed doors, where they remained without a trial for more than two years.

Further investigation by the same commission has turned up links between the men who shot Rosenberg and those who killed Marjorie and Khalil Musa.

Two of the killers who took part in both killings and had originally changed their testimony to accuse the Valdés Paiz brothers have accused the Public Ministry of Guatemala and the United Nations Commission Against Impunity in Guatemala of pressuring them to accuse the Valdés Paiz brothers.

== Career ==
Rosenberg graduated with honors from Rafael Landívar University in Guatemala City. He earned a Master of Arts degree in International Law and Comparative Law from the University of Cambridge, St Edmund's College and a Master of Arts in Commercial Law and International Law from Harvard University.

In 1987, Rosenberg co-founded Rosenberg-Marzano, Marroquin-Pemueller & Asociados, S.C., a law firm. He specialized in Business/Commercial, Corporate, International, Trademark, Constitutional, Tax, and Procedural Law. He was also on the legal staff of Rodríguez Mahuad & Asociados, another law firm, and was appointed Vice-Dean of the Law School at Rafael Landívar University. He also served as president of the Board of Directors of CENAC Foundation (Center for Arbitration and Mediation).

== The killing ==
Rosenberg's recorded video message claiming that President Colom would be responsible if he were killed

Rosenberg was shot dead on May 10, 2009, while cycling in Guatemala City. He was approached by an assassin who came down a grass bank and shot him in the back. The killer ran around Rosenberg's left side and fired another bullet down his cheek, which exited from his neck, and another, which did not exit, into his neck. The killer then knelt on his right side and placed the gun under Rosenberg's jaw, firing another bullet that tore through Rosenberg's eye and went out his left temple. Finally, the murderer moved the gun to Rosenberg's forehead as it faced away from him and fired a final shot, which lodged in his brain.

== The video seen around the world ==
In an 18-minute videotape recorded prior to his death, Marzano said that President Álvaro Colom wanted him dead and would be responsible should he be murdered: "If you are watching this message, it is because I was assassinated by President Álvaro Colom, with help from Colom's private secretary Gustavo Alejos."

Rosenberg claimed his death would be due to his involvement with two clients: Khalil Musa, a prominent businessman, and Musa's daughter, Marjorie, who were both assassinated in April 2009. Khalil Musa had been nominated by members of President Colom's government to serve on the board of Guatemala's Banrural (Rural Development) bank.

Rosenberg claimed the President, Sandra de Colom (the First Lady of Guatemala), members of the Colom Administration, and their business associates were using Banrural to embezzle and launder money, and because Musa would not tolerate this corruption he was assassinated. The video called for Colom to step down and Vice President of Guatemala Rafael Espada to replace him. It ended with,

... the only reality that counts is this: if you saw and heard this message, it is because I was killed by Álvaro Colom and Sandra de Colom, with the help of Gustavo Alejos. Guatemalans, the time has come. Please — it is time. Good afternoon.

== Political crisis ==
The airing of the video at Rosenberg's funeral, then uploaded to YouTube and broadcast on national television, precipitated a political crisis in Guatemala. Protesters demonstrated in Guatemala City's Central Plaza, and opponents urged president Colom to step down from office. President Colom appeared on national television to reject Rosenberg's accusations and called for both the United Nations and the FBI to investigate.

In an interview with CNN Español, Colom asserted the Rosenberg video was "completely fake", thus challenging early reports from the International Commission against Impunity in Guatemala (CICIG), which validated its authenticity.

On May 13, 2009, the United States Ambassador to Guatemala, Stephen G. McFarland, confirmed that FBI personnel had arrived in Guatemala to aid in the investigation.

At least one blogger, Jean Anleu Fernández, was arrested on charges of "inciting financial panic" after he urged readers to withdraw deposits from Banrural. Anleu had suggested on the social messaging network Twitter that all account holders should withdraw their funds from Banrural. He was placed under house arrest on May 14, 2009. Anleu's short message, "Primera accion real 'sacar el pisto de Banrural' quebrar al banco de los corruptos," resulted in a judge ordering his detention and suggesting a fine of up to GTQ50,000. Attempts to censor Anleu's message backfired, because of the Streisand effect. A Guatemalan appeals court ruled on 10 July 2009 that the case lacked merit. Some US$7,000 was spent on Anleu's legal fees, half contributed by Twitter users by PayPal. Vice president Espada filed a criminal complaint against journalist, Marta Yolanda Díaz-Durán. In August, 2010, the Constitutional Court rejected the vice president's complaint on the grounds that the columnist was "protected by the right to freedom of thought".

== United Nations investigation ==
By September 12, 2009, Guatemalan police arrested a total of nine men, among them two active policemen, two former policemen and an ex-soldier and three other gang members, who were charged with Rosenberg's killing.

In January 2010, the International Commission against Impunity in Guatemala (CICIG), a commission in charge of recommending governmental change backed by the UN and the Guatemalan government, announced the results of its own investigation, concluding that Rosenberg had arranged his own death. It concluded that he asked two cousins of his ex-wife to arrange the assassination of a man he claimed was blackmailing him. However, the target was, according to the CICIG, himself. The cousins are said to have contracted eleven guns-for-hire, most of whom were former or current police officers and one ex-military. Rosenberg was said to have used an anonymous cell phone to call his personal cell phone number, creating the appearance of death threats and to call the hit men on the morning of his death. Investigators traced the phone to his driver from a sales tax receipt.

This key piece of evidence was used to convince the Guatemalan populace and the world that Rodrigo Rosenberg had himself killed. The allegation was that he himself contacted the killers via cellphone to give them instructions for the killing. This allegation was based on information that placed the calls made to the killers within Rodrigo Rosenberg's apartment.

The CICIG commission said Rosenberg had been depressed over the murder of the Musas, and especially of Marjorie Musa, with whom he had had a relationship. According to the CICIG, he was convinced the government had killed Marjorie, but lacked the evidence required to pursue the matter in court. They concluded from this that his death therefore was simply a bizarre suicide.

In light of the discovery, Vice-President Rafael Espada (who Rosenberg had called on to replace President Colom) denied having any contact with Rosenberg or anyone close to him before the murder. More recent information about the Musas' murder indicated that Khalil Musa had finally declined the board of directors nomination, and that a more likely suspect for his murder than government officials was "a criminal network" from whom he had purchased "contraband for his textile factory". Several of the people arrested for the killing of Rodrigo Rosenberg were also arrested on 22 September 2010 for participating in the murder of the Musas, including one of the men who was freed for testifying against the Valdés brothers, Mario Paz Mejía. Paz Mejía's brother Wilfredo Antonio Paz Mejía was also implicated in their murder.

== Conflicting accounts ==
Not everyone agrees with the CICIG's conclusion that Rodrigo Rosenberg killed himself, and that the Valdés Paiz brothers had anything to do with it. The following evidence contradicts or weakens some of the CICIG's main points, or brings up new questions.

=== Mario Paz Mejia - hitman confesses ===
Mario Paz Mejía, a policeman with connections in high places in the Guatemalan Government, was one of the people captured and originally accused of the murder of Rodrigo Rosenberg in October 2009, six months after the murder. Paz Mejía was eventually freed for collaborating with the authorities.

According to Lucas Josué Santiago López, one of the other members who had no previous record, Paz Mejía threatened and at the same time offered money for Lucas' family, to force him to say that he, Lucas Santiago, had done the shooting. Lucas Santiago's testimony in court about Paz Mejía's role in the killing, the threats and bribery were ignored and the original sentence increased for not collaborating.

Paz Mejía was freed, in spite of Castresana's guarantee during the presentation that no one would go free, that the judge would only reduce his sentence, and he remained free until evidence of his participation in the killing of Rodrigo Rosenberg's clients, Khalil and Marjorie Musa, could no longer be denied. Lucas Santiago was once again the alleged hit man in the murder of the Musas.

=== False leads in the investigation ===
Months before Carlos Castresana publicly hypothesized that Rosenberg had killed himself, Ovidio Batz Tax, another self-declared witness, was given money to say that people in the opposition party had Rodrigo Rosenberg killed. Journalists were taken in the first lady's, Sandra Torres', helicopter by Salvador Gandara, the minister of Gobernación, the state ministry in charge of security matters, to hear the witness make his declaration. Sandra Torres, along with her husband, the President of Guatemala, was one of the people accused in Rosenberg's video. The minister was seen paying the witness and the journalists.

=== The Valdés Paiz brothers - falsely accused ===
Another alleged connection between the killers and José and Francisco Valdés came from a number in the memory of one or more of the phones confiscated from an alleged intermediary of the group, Jesús Manuel Cardona Medina, alias Memín, cousin to one of the band members. The number corresponded to a cell phone which belonged to the company owned by the Valdés brothers. The phone was used by Nelson Wilfredo Santos Estrada, the Valdés' chief of Security. Nelson Santos has never appeared to testify.

Two years after Castresana's public conclusions, the cousins themselves are in jail, having been accused of "complicity" in the killing of Rosenberg. The main link between them and the killers is the testimony of ten of the members of the band. All ten of them, unanimously "...confirmed for us that the only people implicated are the Valdés brothers, and no one else, no minister, no chief of police, and no official." This is the same band that Castresana declared to have had a history of murder, drug trafficking, money laundering, kidnapping and extortion, one of whom later admitted to lying under oath.

=== The Alejos brothers - people with power ===
The next linkage involves a check sent by the cousin of one of the men accused by Rosenberg in his famous video. A check for US$40,000 was sent by Luis Alejos, cousin to Gustavo Alejos, the president's private secretary, and brother of the general secretary of the party in power. It arrived in Rodrigo Rosenberg's office three days after he was killed. Rosenberg's secretary testified she had instructions from Rosenberg to deliver the check to his ex-wife's cousin, Francisco Valdés. The check didn't have either Rosenberg's or Valdés' name on it, but was, according to Carlos Castresana, the payment for the killing, three days after the murder. The check itself was never presented as evidence.

=== Changing testimony ===
Eventually, the band members, several of them ex-policemen, testified one by one that they had been paid Q300,000, the equivalent in dollars to the check supposedly sent by Luis Alejos. One exception was the only alleged intermediary in custody, Jesus Manuel Cardona Medina, who refused to admit for a long time that they had been paid more than Q50,000. This is the same man who refused to "ask for forgiveness" for the killing because he felt that eliminating an extortionist was a "humanitarian gesture." For both cases of intransigence, he was threatened with having his status as collaborator removed. Unlike Paz Mejía, the man who pulled the trigger in this operation, Cardona Medina was found guilty and never freed from jail, although he did receive a reduction in his prison term.

=== Minister of Communications of the Government of Alvaro Colom ===
The man who sent the check, Luis Alejos, was head of the Ministry of Communications of Guatemala.

The first direct association between Rosenberg and his killers is testimony by alleged experts in telecommunications who gave evidence that Rosenberg used the cell phone that was used to make the threats to his personal number. The cell phone the threats originated from was never found, even though Rosenberg supposedly used it minutes before his murder, but the owner of the phone was found, Rodrigo Rosenberg's bodyguard, Luis López Florián.

=== Luis López Florian - the chauffeur ===
Luis López Florián was Rodrigo Rosenberg's man Friday. He drove for him, was his bodyguard and was even front man for some of his businesses, such as Landosa Digital, S.A. The store receipt had his name on it; he was recorded on video in the place and time the phone was purchased. He eventually said he bought a second phone, at a different place, which did not have a record of his name and which he said he thought he had delivered to the Valdés brothers. This second phone operated in the vicinity of Rosenberg when first purchased and then later in the environs of the intermediary, Cardona Medina. This phone was purportedly delivered to Cardona through the chief of Security of the Valdés', one of the men who was never found. It was not stated by Castresana whether the phone was ever found among Cardona Medina's possessions, only that it operated in his vicinity.

"Entries" were made into Rosenberg's accounting records for the purchase of the phones; exactly by whom the entries were made is not made clear by Castresana's presentation, only implied by the word secretariat. The customer receipts were never publicly presented as evidence, only the store receipts were, and only one of them with López's name on it. Aside from López Florián, there were over 300 policemen involved in the case, close to a dozen officials from the Guatemalan Public Ministry, and several CICIG investigators any of whom, at one time or another, could have had access to the records, especially before the suicide theory was settled on, nine months after the murder.

"On 8 September 2009, the Fiscalía listened to a conversation in which Santos Divas was warned by another member of the band that López had made a document telling about the Rosenberg crime and left it with a general in the Army who would make it public if anything happened to him." Which Lopez is not specified in the Prensa Libre article titled: Agendas Disclose Contact Between Killers and Police. (Agendas delatan contacto de sicarios con policías. 24/05/10.) Willian [sic] Gilberto Santos Divas was in the car with Mario Paz Mejía during the operation.

Rodrigo Rosenberg spoke by cell phone with López Florián two minutes before he left his apartment that fateful morning, and told him he was going out for a bike ride. It is at this time that the killers received information about their target, "el venado," who was slaughtered ten minutes later. Castresana alleged, but gave no proof other than the telecommunications expert's testimony on the cell-phone's supposed location on that morning, that this information was given by Rosenberg himself. The phone itself was never presented as evidence. López Florián called Rodrigo's son while close to the scene of the crime, shortly after the murder, to inform him of his father's death.

=== An eyewitness never questioned by the authorities ===
Approximately half an hour before Rosenberg rode away from his apartment to his death, a person walking some dogs saw a man wearing a suit sitting on the curb where Rosenberg was soon killed. The witness called and reported this fact to the police within minutes of the sighting, but the report was ignored; it never came out in the investigation.

=== The CICIG's early appearance on the scene of the crime ===
The CICIG, however, was at the scene of the crime, together with the vice-minister of Gobernación very shortly after Rosenberg's death, while his body still lay in situ. The video that made it national and international news would not come out until the next day.

=== In charge of the scene of the crime ===
Claudia Muñoz, mother of the girlfriend of the Presidential Spokesman, Fernando Barillas was initially in charge of the case. She had a meeting with Gustavo Alejos in the President's house on the day Rosenberg's video came out. Muñóz's son in law sued her for harassment and death threats.

=== Family declares response to the handling of the case ===
On 10 August 2011, his son, Eduardo Rosenberg Paiz, made the following comment: "We don't care about the final conclusions that a failed system of justice makes about his death," denying that his father's purpose had been to overthrow a particular government, but to "turn our Republic into a State of Rule of Law, where governors and governed obey the law and where no crime can remain unpunished."

=== One band of killers - two related murders ===
In September, 2010, María Encarnación Mejia, interim attorney general for the CICIG, declared that seven of the 11 people who participated in the murder of Marjorie and Khalil Musa were involved in the killing of Rodrigo Rosenberg.

=== Two of the killers accuse officials of pressuring them to falsely testify ===
In July 2013, one of these men, Mario Luis Paz Mejia, who was eventually convicted in the killing of Marjorie and Khalil Musa, once again changed his testimony in the Rosenberg case, absolving the Valdés Paiz brothers from involvement in Rosenberg's murder. He declared: "The Paiz brothers don't have anything to do with this. I never saw them."

He stated that the public prosecutor, Rubén Herrera, made all kinds of offers in order for him to declare against the Valdés Paiz brothers, as well as having been shown two photographs from the papers in order to involve them in the crime. César Calderón, the defense lawyer, asked Paz Mejía what had been offered by the prosecutors, and he responded that security and Q50,000.

Francisco Capuano, another of the defense lawyers, asked the witness who else had pressured him to testify against the Valdés Paiz brothers in 2010. Instead of answering, he looked around and pointed to Luis Orozco, an official of the CICIG, the United Nations International Commission against Impunity in Guatemala.

The witness said he asked to declare in court because he wanted to clear his conscience and die in peace. He emphasized that it was the Ministerio Público and the CICIG who had pressured him into lying.

In a video a few weeks later, Jesús Manuel Cardona Medína, alias Memín, accused members of the Public Ministry and the CICIG of pressuring him into accusing the Valdés Paiz brothers. They told him that he and the Valdés Paiz brothers would be in jail for only three months, that they needed to protect the government. He accuses Rubén Herrera, the same public prosecutor mentioned above, of showing him photos and the complete names of the Valdés brothers in order to accuse them.

Cardona was imprisoned in a maximum security prison, completely isolated, unable to see the light of day or to communicate with anyone during almost three years, precisely because of his reluctance to continue collaborating with what he called a show. Cardona Medina was the same man who previously denied for a long time that they had been paid more than Q50,000, and the same man mentioned above who refused to ask for forgiveness for the killing because he thought that eliminating an extortionist was not something that required forgiveness.

=== Prominent lawyer connected to Rosenberg case and accused of libel by CICIG assassinated by hitman on motorcycle ===
Lea Marie de León was killed on one of the principal boulevards of Guatemala City during the day of February 2013. She accused Alvaro Colom of having been involved in Rodrigo Rosenberg's murder. In March 2011, de León was accused of libel by the CICIG while she was defending people who questioned the CICIG's honorability in the Rosenberg case.
