= Embassy of Guatemala, Washington, D.C. =

Embassy

Embassy of Guatemala
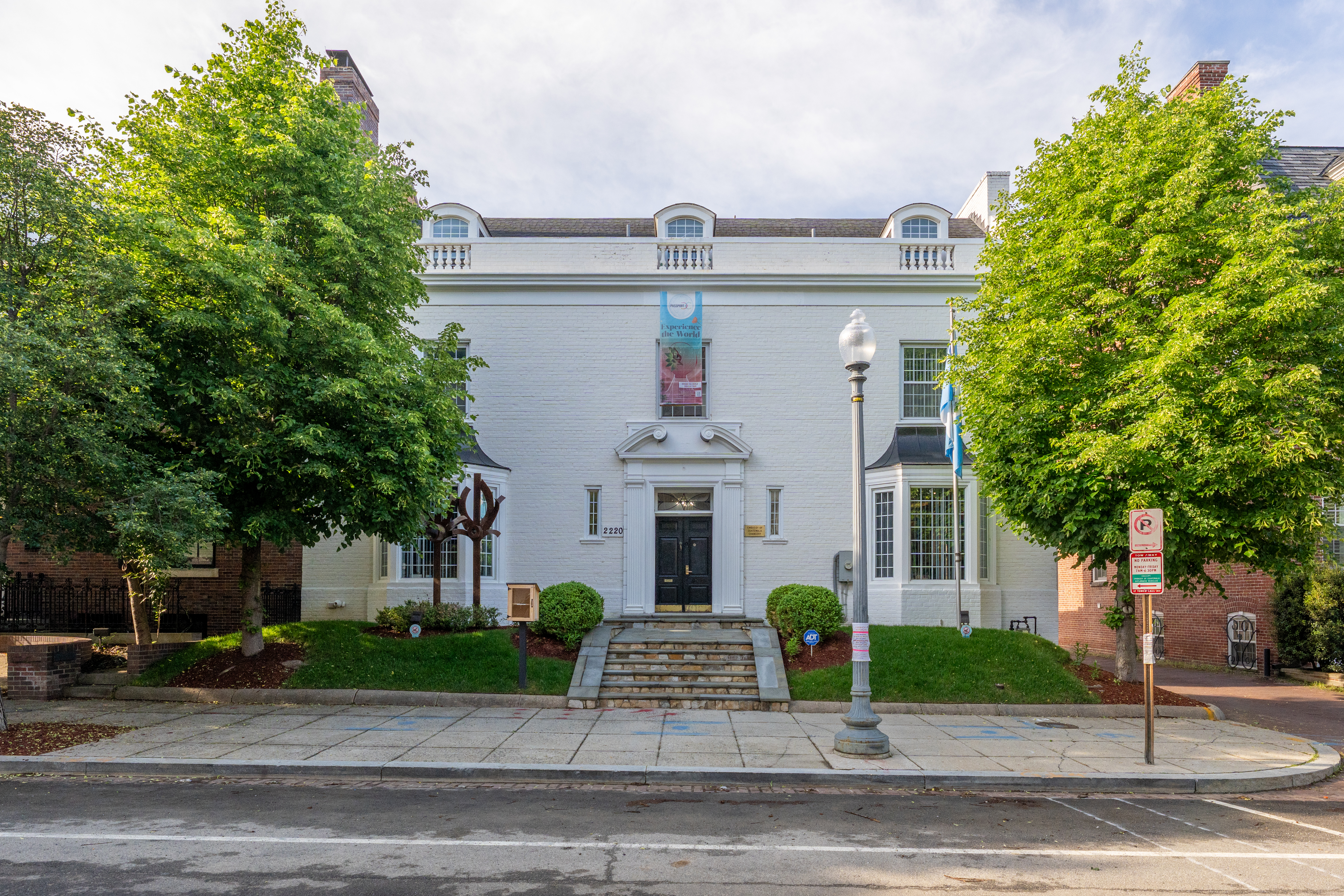
- Location: Washington, D.C.
- Address: 2220 R Street, N.W.
- Coordinates: 38°54′44.85″N 77°2′58.5″W
- Ambassador: Hugo Beteta
- Website: https://estadosunidos.minex.gob.gt

The Guatemalan Embassy is the diplomatic representative of the Guatemala Government to the United States Government. Its main functions are to protect the interests of the State and its citizens; keep the channels of communication between governments, encourage and promote trade relations and track identified topics of interest by both countries.

It is located at 2220 R Street NW, Washington, DC. The current ambassador is Hugo Beteta.

The Embassy of Guatemala shares its premises with the Permanent Mission of Guatemala to the Organization of American States (OAS). The current Ambassador is Claudia Escobar Mejía, a Guatemalan jurist, diplomat and anti-corruption advocate.

== History ==
Following its independence from Spain in 1821, Guatemala joined the Federation of Central American States in 1823 along with Honduras, Nicaragua, Costa Rica, and El Salvador. The United States recognized the Federation of Central America and the diplomatic relations with Guatemala were established when President James Monroe received Antonio José Cañaz as Envoy Extraordinary and Minister Plenipotentiary on August 4, 1824.

The American Legation in Guatemala was established on May 3, 1826, when the Chargé d'Affaires John Williams presented his credentials to the Federation of Central American States.

On May 4, 1943, the Guatemalan Legation in the United States was raised to Embassy with Adrian Recinos as Envoy Extraordinary and Minister Plenipotentiary.

Independent Guatemala was recognized on April 5, 1844, by the issuance of an exequatur to a Guatemalan Consul-General Antonío de Aycinena. Diplomatic relations with independent Guatemala were established in 1849 when Chargé d'Affaires Elijah Hise presented his credentials to the Republic of Guatemala on or shortly before January 21, 1849.

After Jacobo Arbenz government was overthrown, on July 12, 1954, Secretary of State John Foster Dulles instructed the U.S. Embassy at Guatemala City to establish diplomatic relations with the new Guatemalan government. The following day, Ambassador John E. Peurifoy informed Foreign Minister Salazar of the U.S. recognition of the new government in Guatemala.

== Former ambassadors ==
Diplomatic representation of Guatemala in the U.S.

Designated	Diplomatic accreditation	Name	Rank
June 8, 1893		Antonio Lazo Arriaga	E.E. and M.P. (Also E.E. and M.P. of Honduras )
September 30, 1904		Jorge Muñoz	E.E. and M.P.
October 22, 1906		Ramón Bengoechea	Chargé d'Affaires a.i.
March 1907	March 18, 1907	Sr. Dr. Luis Toledo Herrarte	E.E. and M.P.
December 19, 1911		Joaquín Méndez	E.E. and M.P.
November 29, 1920		Dr. Julio Bianchi	E.E. and M.P.
April 19, 1922		Sr. Don Francisco Sanchez Latour	Chargé d'Affaires a.i.
May 23, 1922		Francisco Sánchez Latour	E.E. and M.P. DIED November 1927
November 8, 1927		Julio Montano Novella,	Chargé d'Affaires
January 11, 1928		Dr. Adrian Recinos	E.E. and M.P.
May 4, 1943		LEGATION RAISED TO EMBASSY	
April 19, 1943	May 4, 1943	Dr. Adrian Recinos	Amb. E. and P.
October 18, 1944		Antonio Najera Cabrera,	Appt. Amb. E. and P.
November 8, 1944		Dr. Enrique López-Herrarte	Chargé d'Affaires a.i.
December 19, 1944	January 1, 1945	Sr Don Eugenio Silva Pena	Amb. E. and P.
July 26, 1945	August 10, 1945	Jorge García Granados,	Amb. E. and P.
December 16, 1947		Francisco Linares Aranda,	Chargé d'Affaires a.i.
March 2, 1948	March 15, 1948	Ismaél González Arévalo	Amb. E. and P.
December 13, 1949	January 11, 1950	Dr. Antonio Goubaud-Carrera	Amb. E. and P. (DIED March 8, 1951)
February 18, 1951		Alfredo Chocano	Chargé d'Affaires a.i..
March 18, 1951	June 4, 1951	Carlos H. Aldana-Sandoval	Amb. E. and P.
September 4, 1952	September 24, 1952	Dr. Guillermo Toriello	Amb. E. and P.
Arbenz Government in Guatemala overthrown			
July 13, 1954		Diplomatic relations established with Guatemala (New Government)	
August 13, 1954	August 16, 1954	Lt. Colonel José Luis Cruz-Salazar	Amb. E. and P.
June 3, 1958	June 16, 1958	Colonel Carlos Santillán-Hernández	Amb. E. and P.
July 1, 1959	July 13, 1959	Colonel Arturo Ramirez Pinto	Amb. E. and P.
June 6, 1960	June 8, 1960	Carlos Alejos	Amb. E. and P.
June 11, 1963	July 10, 1963	Dr. Carlos García Bauer	Amb. E. and P.
September 8, 1966	September 9, 1966	Francisco Linares Aranda	Amb. E. and P.
October 23, 1970	November 5, 1970	Julio Asensio	Amb. E. and P.
May 15, 1976		M. Fernando Sesenna Ot	Minister Counselor Chargé d'Affaires ad interim
June 10, 1976	June 22, 1976	Federico Abundio Maldonado Gularte	Amb. E. and P.
November 30, 1977	January 18, 1978	Jorge LAMPORT Rodil	Amb. E. and P.
December 1, 1978		Mrs. Norma J. Vasquez	Minister Counselor, Chargé d'Affaires ad interim
December 21, 1978	February 26, 1979	General Felipe Doroteo MONTERROSO Miranda	Amb. E. and P.
June 9, 1982	July 29, 1982	Jorge Luis ZELAYA Coronado	Amb. E. and P.
July 15, 1983		Norma J. Vasquezr	Minister Counselor Chargé d'Affaires, ad interim
December 7, 1983	January 9, 1984	Federico FAESEN Ortega	Amb. E. and P.
February 6, 1985	March 5, 1985	Eduardo PALOMO Escobar	Amb. E. and P.
January 27, 1987	February 10, 1987	Oscar PADILLA Vidaurre	Amb. E. and P.
October 5, 1988	November 9, 1988	Rodolfo Rohrmoser V.	Amb. E. and P.
February 7, 1990	April 9, 1990	John SCHWANK Duran	Amb. E. and P.
June 27, 1991	August 6, 1991	Juan Jose Caso-Fanjul	Amb. E. and P.
March 3, 1993	June 11, 1993	Edmond Mulet	Amb. E. and P.
March 11, 1996	April 30, 1996	Pedro Miguel Lamport Kelsall	Amb. E. and P.
September 5, 1998	September 10, 1998	William Howard Stixrud	Amb. E. and P.
May 27, 2000	June 14, 2000	Ariel Rivera Irias	Amb. E. and P.
December 4, 2002	December 9, 2002	Antonio Arenales	Amb. E. and P.
March 26, 2004	March 31, 2004	José Guillermo Castillo Villacorta	Amb. E. and P.
March 13, 2008	April 9, 2008	Francisco Villagrán de León	Amb. E. and P.
August 5, 2011	September 9, 2011	Julio Martini Herrera	Amb. E. and P.
August 17, 2012	May 2, 2012	Francisco Villagrán de León	Amb. E. and P.
September 5, 2013	September 17, 2013	Jose Julio Alejandro Ligorria Carballido	Amb. E. and P.
	June 27, 2016	Maritza Ruíz de Vielman	Amb. E. and P.
January 5, 2017	July 30, 2017	Manuel Espina Pinto	Amb. E. and P.
January 15, 2020	June 13, 2020	Alfonso Quiñónez Lemus	Amb. E. and P.
	January 18, 2024	Viviana Raquel Arenas Aguilar	Minister Counselor Chargé d'Affaires, ad interim
May 17, 2024	June 17, 2024	Hugo Eduardo Beteta Méndez-Ruiz	Amb. E. and P.

Abbreviations:

- [Amb.] E.E. and M.P.= Envoy Extraordinary and Minister Plenipotentiary
- [Chargé d'Affaires] a.i.= ad interim
- Amb. E. & P. = Ambassador Extraordinary and Plenipotentiary

== Bilateral relationship ==
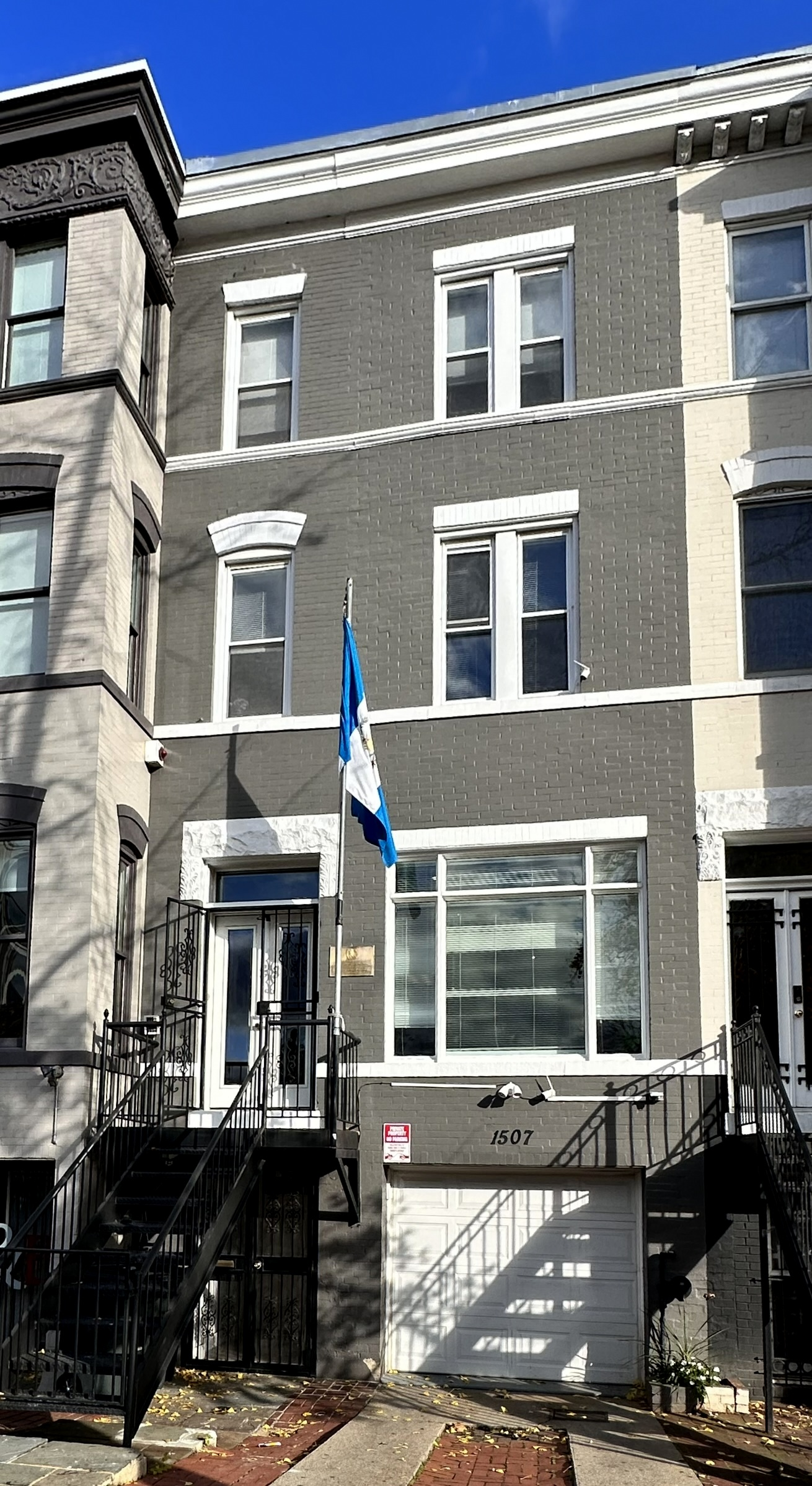
Permanent Mission of Guatemala to the Organization of American States

Guatemala has a good diplomatic, political, economic, and trade relationship with the United States. The United States remains one of the major trading partners of Guatemala, there are strong political and cooperation ties between the two countries.

The bilateral relationship with the United States on security can be defined as the high priority by the importance of the developed joint actions, especially the cooperation for regional security and the improvement of public organizations, among others.

The relationship is maintained and performed at the highest level with officials from the United States Department of State, the Department of Homeland Security, US Southern Command, the United States Senate and the Ministry of Narcotics Affairs.

Guatemala maintains relationships with the Department of Homeland Security with the US Immigration and Customs Enforcement (ICE) and the Customs and Border Protection (CBP) in conjunction with the National Secretariat for Property Management in Forfeiture.

This relationship has brought support to several institutions in Guatemala combating organized crime. Among the main activities are: funding for Police Reform programs, High Trust Units (vetted Units), the anti-gang program (PANDA) and CICIG Model and police stations. In addition, support in the modernization of research processes and the reform of institutionalization in the Public Ministry, the process of extradition, modernizing and strengthening the implementation of justice, the prison system, training programs and maritime capabilities, and prevention and detection of criminal activity at the border.

The main concerns in the Guatemala-United States bilateral relationships are: Regional Security Initiative for Central America (CARSI), National Police and Public Ministry, adoptions, International Commission against impunity in Guatemala (CICIG), Human Rights, institutionalization of project FIAAT and TPS (Temporary Protected Status).

== Guatemalan consulates in the United States ==
Guatemala has established 25 consulates in the United States. Each consulate has its jurisdiction, which covers different areas of the country.

== See also ==
- Guatemala–United States relations
- Guatemalan Americans
- Foreign relations of the United States
- Foreign relations of Guatemala
