= Fernando Carrera =

Guatemalan economist, political analyst and diplomat

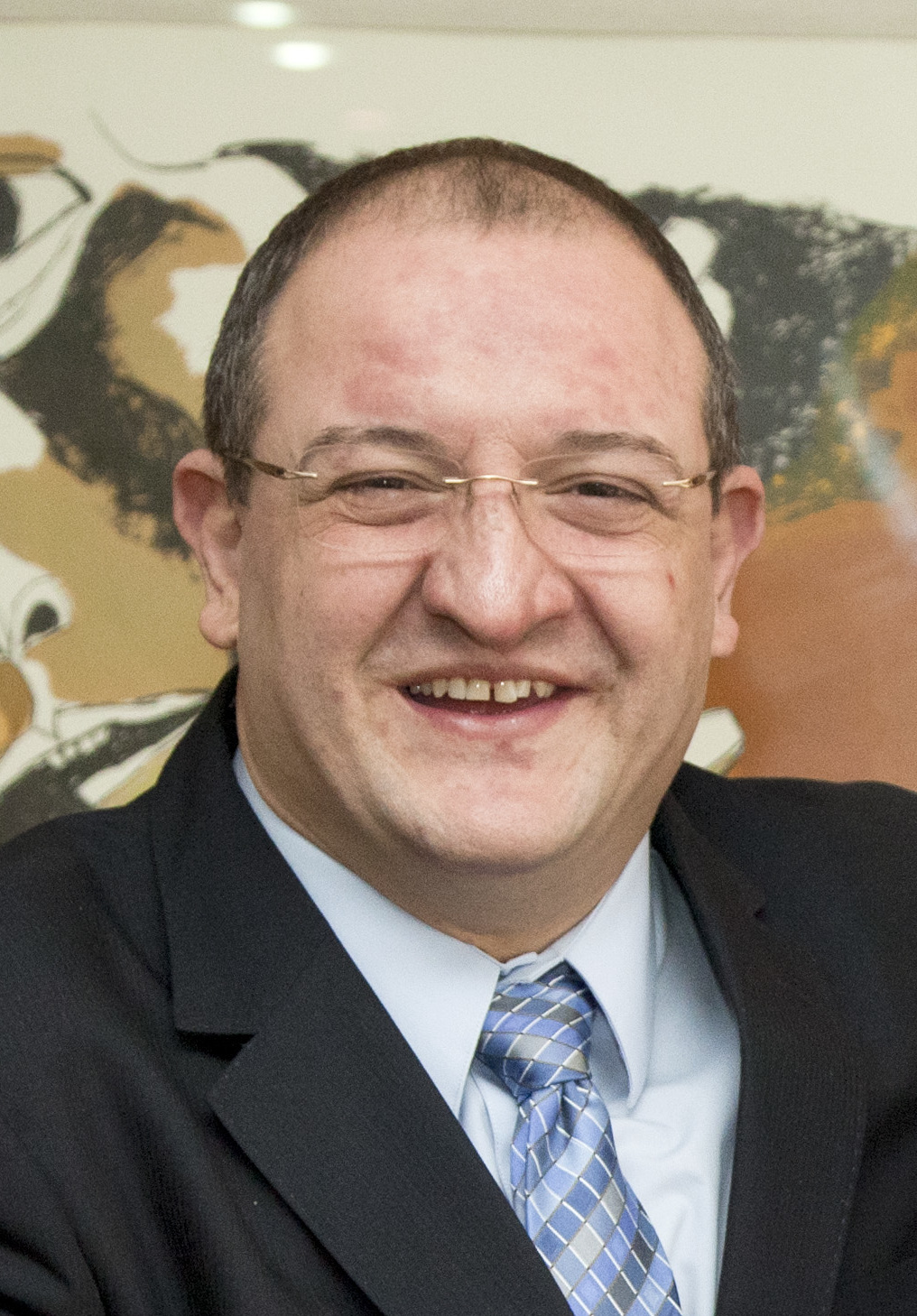

Minister of Foreign Affairs of Guatemala
- In office 15 January 2013 – 16 September 2014
- President: Otto Pérez Molina
- Preceded by: Harold Caballeros
- Succeeded by: Carlos Raúl Morales
- In office 2011–2012

Guatemalan Ambassador to the United Nations
- In office 19 September 2014 – 22 September 2015
- President: Otto Pérez Molina
- Preceded by: Gert Rosenthal
- Succeeded by: José Alberto Sandoval Cojulún

Personal details
- Born: April 19, 1966 (age 60) Guatemala City, Guatemala
- Spouse: Elizabeth Ugalde
- Children: Amanda Isabel; Laura Beatriz
- Education: UNA; Cambridge University
- Profession: Economist/Diplomat
- Website: MINEX

Ambassador Luis Fernando Carrera Castro (born April 19, 1966) is a Guatemalan economist, political analyst and diplomat. He served as Permanent Representative of Guatemala to the United Nations during the presidency of Otto Perez Molina. Before that, he served as the Minister for Foreign Affairs, during the same administration. He is a Guatemalan economist, specializing in fiscal policies, and also a political analyst. He obtained his bachelor's degree in economics from the National University of Costa Rica in 1990. Then, he obtained an M. Phil. in Economics and Politics of Development, at the University of Cambridge in 1992.

== Personal History ==
Luis Fernando Carrera Castro was born in Guatemala City. Son of José Roberto Carrera Bonilla and Judith Castro de Carrera. His father was originally from Guatemala City, and his mother came from Tactic, Alta Verapaz. He began his studies in Guatemala City, but due to the political situation of the country, his father went into exile in 1971 and the rest of the family moved to Costa Rica in 1975, where he finishes primary and secondary school. He finishes his undergraduate studies as Bachelor at the Universidad Nacional de Costa Rica in 1990, and then departs to England, to obtain his MPhil degree on Economics and Politics of Development at the University of Cambridge in 1992. He is married to economist Elizabeth Ugalde Miranda, Costa Rican, with whom he has two daughters, Amanda Isabel and Laura Beatriz.

== Professional life ==
Between 1993 and 1994, he was the Research Director for the Latin American regional office of the International Cooperative Alliance, and he was a consultant in rural development programs in El Salvador and Nicaragua, for several European NGO's.

From 1994 to 2007, he worked for the United Nations Children's Fund (UNICEF) in different capacities, from consultant in Costa Rica and Guatemala, to Deputy Representative in Ecuador, and later Representative in Cape Verde (West Africa) and Panama.

From 2008 to 2010, he worked as Executive Director of the Instituto Centroamericano de Estudios Fiscales, ICEFI (Central American Institute for Fiscal Studies). From March 2010 until December 2011, he served as Executive Director for the Soros Foundation in Guatemala.

From 2008 through 2011 Carrera wrote a weekly op-ed in elPeriódico, a Guatemalan newspaper, and his editorials were also published by different media outlets in Central America, Spain and the United States. His analysis and comments have also been broadcast on international TV networks, such as CNN, Al Jazeera and the Spanish Television (TVE).

He has written technical abstracts in specialized publications of the United Nations. He has also participated as a speaker in several international seminars and workshops in Europe, Japan, Latin America and the United States.

During his international career, Carrera Castro collaborated in various public policy research and advocacy efforts, aiming to strengthen the capacities of government and civil society for the use of Fiscal Policy as a tool to foster human development. In this regard, he has sought to promote Human Rights compliance through an effective and strategic use of public budgets.

=== SEGEPLAN ===
Between 2011 and 2012, Carrera was appointed by Otto Perez Molina, President of Guatemala, as Secretary for Planning and Programming (a ministerial level cabinet appointment).

== Ministry of Foreign Affairs ==
On January 14, 2013, Carrera was appointed Guatemala's Minister of Foreign Affairs by President Otto Pérez.

== Ambassador to the UN ==
On September 8, 2014, President Otto Pérez announced that Fernando Carrera was being removed from his post as Foreign Affairs Minister, and transferred to the UN, where he served as the Guatemalan Ambassador at the Permanent Mission. Ambassador Carrera presented his credential letters to the UN Secretary General on September 19, 2014.

Because of the political turmoils in Guatemala, in 2015, Ambassador Carrera requested publicly for the resignation of president Perez Molina. After manifesting it in an opinion editorial, he presented his resignation to his post at the UN on August 25, 2015.
