= Pedro Brolo =

Guatemalan economist, diplomat and politician

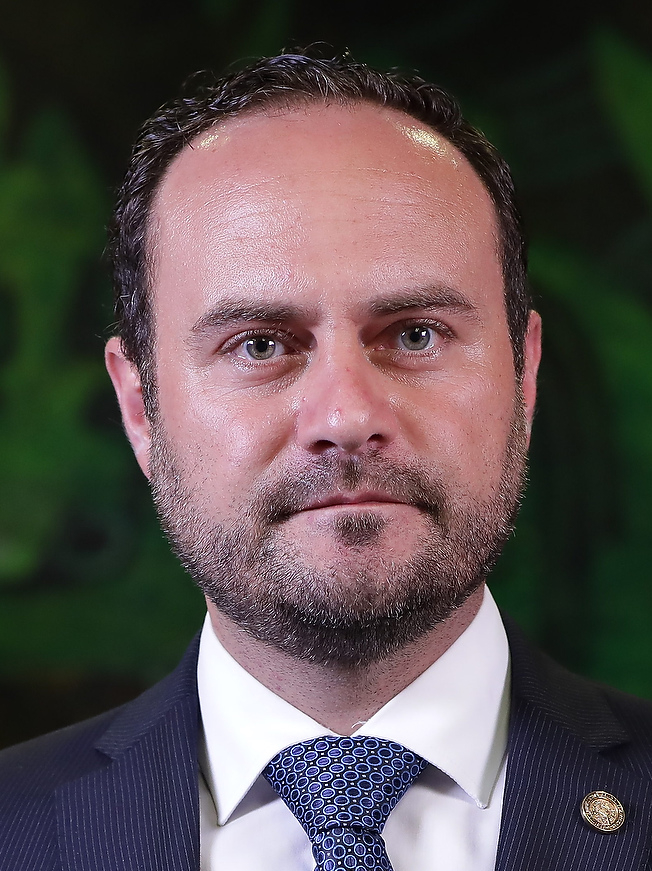
- Brolo in 2020

Minister of Foreign Affairs
- In office 14 January 2020 – 31 January 2022
- President: Alejandro Giammattei
- Preceded by: Sandra Jovel
- Succeeded by: Mario Búcaro

Personal details
- Born: Pedro Brolo Vila; 3 February 1981 (age 45) Guatemala City, Guatemala
- Children: 2

Pedro Brolo Vila (born 3 February 1981) is a Guatemalan economist, diplomat and politician who served as Minister of Foreign Affairs from 14 January 2020 to 31 January 2022, under the government of Alejandro Giammattei.

A member of the Vamos party, he was the party's nominee in the 2019 Guatemala City mayoral election, obtaining fifth place with 9,449 and 2.2% of the votes.

== Biography ==
Brolo is an entrepreneur and economist. He has a specialization in Human Rights, Climate Change and Public Policies. He also has a degree in Business Administration and a master's degree in Analysis and Reliability Management.

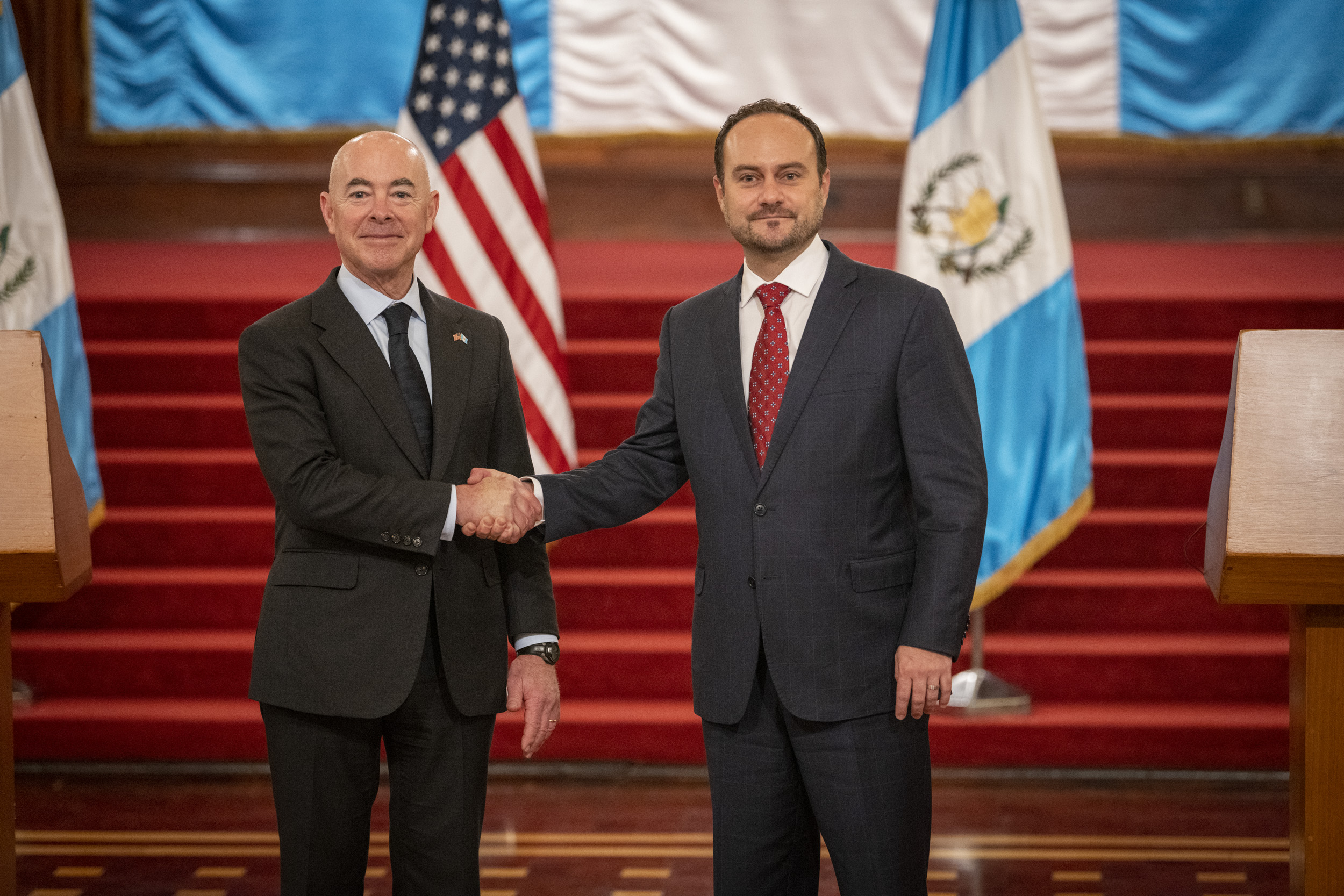
Brolo poses with U.S. Homeland Security Secretary Alejandro Mayorkas following making remarks to press in Guatemala City in July 2021.

He worked as Chief Financial Officer of the Organization of American States in Guatemala and advisor to the offices of the Organization of American States of Ecuador and Honduras. Brolo was appointed as Delegate for the Truth Commission in Honduras, and has worked in the Congress of the Republic as a political analyst.

Brolo was proclaimed candidate for mayor by the Vamos in March 2019, being defeated by Mayor Ricardo Quiñónez Lemus of the Unionist Party on 16 June 2019. Brolo was defeated and obtained fifth place with more than 9,000 votes and 2.2% of the votes.

President-elect Alejandro Giammattei appointed Brolo as Minister of Foreign Affairs and declared that «Brolo will be the youngest Foreign Minister in the history of Guatemala.» However, that comment is incorrect, since there were several younger ones including Guillermo Toriello Garrido, Jorge Skinner-Klée, and Luis Molina Bedoya.

Political offices
Preceded by Sandra Jovel	Minister of Foreign Affairs; 2020–2022	Succeeded by Mario Búcaro
