= Mario Búcaro =

Guatemalan diplomat

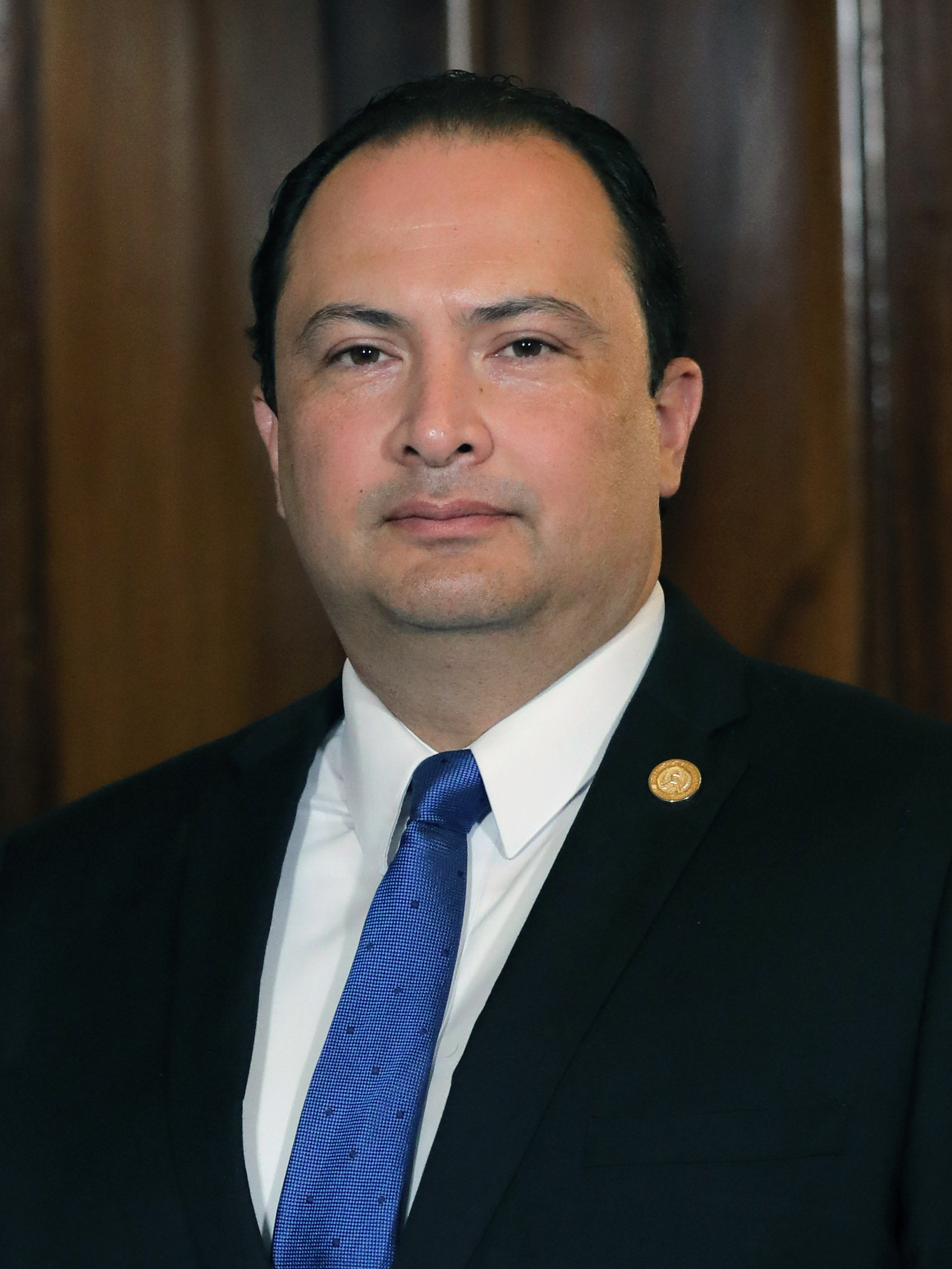
- Official portrait, 2022

Minister of Foreign Affairs
- In office 1 February 2022 – 14 January 2024
- President: Alejandro Giammattei
- Preceded by: Pedro Brolo
- Succeeded by: Carlos Ramiro Martínez

Guatemala Ambassador to Mexico
- In office 3 March 2020 – 1 February 2022
- President: Alejandro Giammattei
- Preceded by: Nelson Olivero
- Succeeded by: Marco Chicas Sosa

Guatemala Ambassador to Israel
- In office 25 October 2018 – 3 March 2020
- President: Jimmy Morales; Alejandro Giammattei
- Preceded by: Sara Angelina Solís Castañeda
- Succeeded by: Julissa Anzueto Aguilar

Personal details
- Born: 5 May 1977 (age 49) Guatemala City
- Education: Rafael Landívar University; University of Salamanca; University of San Carlos of Guatemala

Mario Adolfo Búcaro Flores is a Guatemalan diplomat who was CEO of the Miss Universe Organization from October to December 2025. A former civil servant, Bucaro served as the Minister of Foreign Affairs from February 2022 to January 2024, under the government of Alejandro Giammattei. Previously, he was the Guatemalan Ambassador to Mexico, Israel, Bulgaria and Cyprus.

Political offices
| Preceded by Pedro Brolo | Minister of Foreign Affairs; 2022–2024 | Incumbent |
