= Marta Yolanda Díaz-Durán =

Entrepreneur and Journalist

- Born: Marta Yolanda Díaz-Durán Alvarado; 21 March 1968; Guatemala City, Guatemala
- Occupation: journalist
- Website: www.libertopolis.com

Marta Yolanda Díaz-Durán Alvarado (born 1968) is a Guatemalan entrepreneur, journalist, and university professor. She was sued by the vice president of Guatemala in 2009 for an opinion article which appeared in Siglo Veintiuno. The Constitutional Court, upheld her right to freedom of thought and rejected the criminal prosecution.

== Biography ==
Marta Yolanda Díaz-Durán Alvarado was born 21 March 1968 in Guatemala City, Guatemala. She earned a degree in business administration and economics at the Universidad Francisco Marroquín, and went on to pursue a master's degree in social sciences. She teaches economics and rhetoric at the Henry Hazlitt Center of her alma mater.

She is a columnist for the Guatemalan newspaper Siglo Veintiuno, publishing a weekly column and is the host and producer of the analytical radio programs Todo a pulmón (all lungs) and “4Puntos” (four points) which evaluates issues from a cultural, economic, legal, and political stance. She produces two cultural programs Ecléctico and a musical review program, "Contravía". With her partners Jorge Jacobs and Eduardo Zapeta, Díaz-Durán began Global Pléyades Consulting in 1998, which was expanded to include María Dolores Arias and is a media dissemination organization which operates in Guatemala and broadcasts to 84 countries via radio, internet and Twitter.

Díaz-Durán has published articles in professional journals and electronic media and writings nationally and internationally. For more than four years, she was the producer of the program "Millennium 3" at Emisoras Unidas and in 2002 she hosted the television discussion program "Libertarians" that aired on the cable channel Guatevisión.

== Rosenberg case ==
On 10 May 2009, attorney Rodrigo Rosenberg was killed. After his death, a video left by Rosenberg and released posthumously, alleged those responsible for his death were Álvaro Colom, President of Guatemala, his wife; Sandra Torres; the president's personal secretary, Gustavo Alejos; the businessman, Gregorio Valdéz and others. Rosenberg's tape said that those who killed him were also responsible for the assassination of his client, industrialist Khalil Musa, in April 2009. The allegations on the recording, caused a crisis for the government until evidence exonerated the president.

On 31 August 2009, Díaz-Durán published a column entitled "Kiss of the Sword" in the newspaper Siglo Veintiuno. In the article, Díaz-Durán wrote about a meeting between Rosenberg and Rafael Espada, vice president of Guatemala to discuss the assassination of Musa. After the meeting, Rosenberg told two unidentified sources close to him, that he had received death threats and indeed, Rosenberg was himself killed a week after the meeting with the vice president.

On 1 September 2009, Espada filed a criminal complaint against Díaz-Durán, alleging libel, slander and defamation of character. He stated that he never met with Rosenberg and did not know him. Díaz-Durán refused to disclose her sources and filed for protection from the court for her freedom of thought.

Human Rights organizations and other journalists watched the case against Díaz-Durán. In August, 2010, the Constitutional Court rejected the vice president's complaint on the grounds that the columnist was "protected by the right to freedom of thought".
