= Enrique Muñoz Meany =

Guatemalan diplomat and politician

Minister of Foreign Affairs of Guatemala
- In office 1 June 1947 – 1 June 1949
- President: Juan José Arévalo
- Preceded by: Eugenio Silva Peña
- Succeeded by: Ismael González Arévalo

Secretary of Foreign Affairs
- In office 20 October 1944 – 15 March 1945
- Leader: Jorge Toriello; Francisco Javier Arana; Jacobo Árbenz
- Preceded by: Carlos Salazar
- Succeeded by: Position abolished Guillermo Toriello (as Minister of Foreign Affairs)

Personal details
- Born: 2 February 1907 Guatemala
- Died: 22 December 1951 (aged 44) Paris, France
- Profession: Diplomat

Enrique Muñoz Meany (2 February 1907 – 22 December 1951) was a Guatemalan lawyer, diplomat, politician, writer, activist and journalist.

He graduated from the University of San Carlos de Guatemala in law. During the multitudinous demonstrations during the government of Jorge Ubico, he was one of the main activists who signed the mythical Carta de los 311 in which they asked for the resignation of President Jorge Ubico.

After the overthrow of the successor of Ubico Federico Ponce Vaides, he was appointed by the revolutionary government as Secretary of Foreign Affairs on October 20, 1944, culminating his function on March 15, 1945.

Shortly after in 1947, President Juan José Arévalo appointed him Minister of Foreign Affairs, leaving office in 1949. From that date, Arévalo appointed him ambassador of Guatemala to France, where he died in 1951.
