= Harold Caballeros =

Guatemalan attorney, businessman and politician

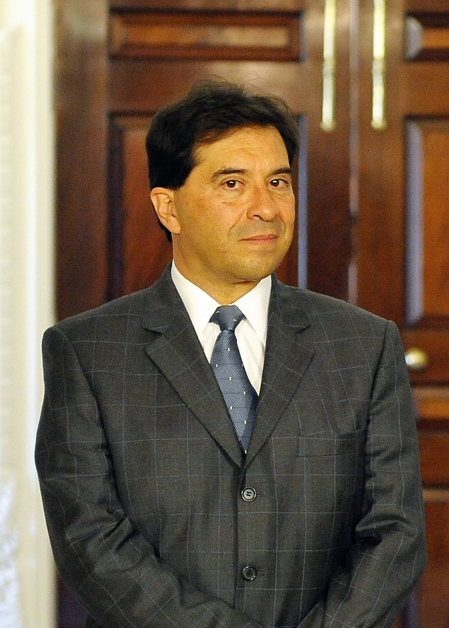
- Caballeros in 2012

Minister of Foreign Affairs of Guatemala
- In office 14 January 2012 – 14 January 2013
- President: Otto Pérez Molina
- Preceded by: Haroldo Rodas
- Succeeded by: Fernando Carrera

Personal details
- Born: June 20, 1956 (age 70) Guatemala City, Guatemala
- Party: Vision with Values
- Spouse: Cecilia Arimany
- Children: Harold, Andrea, Christina y David
- Education: Universidad Francisco Marroquín

Harold Caballeros (born June 20, 1956 in Guatemala City Guatemala) is a Guatemalan attorney, businessman, and politician who served of Guatemala's Minister of Foreign Affairs from 14 January 2012 to 14 January 2013 under the government of Otto Pérez Molina. He founded the Vision with Values (VIVA) political party in 2007 and served as its Secretary General from January 2007 to July 2014. He was dean of the Universidad San Pablo de Guatemala (USPG).

Caballeros has given several lectures in over 45 countries in Latin America, Europe and Asia and has actively participated as facilitator in the Country Vision Plan (Plan Visión de País), which consolidates role of political parties as interlocutors between society and state.

== Studies ==
He studied elementary through high school, graduating in a post-secondary in Arts and Sciences at Liceo Javier, Guatemala. He studied law and notary in the Universidad Francisco Marroquin's Law School, he did a Masters in Business Administration from the University of Miami, Florida and a Masters in International Relations from The Fletcher School of Law and Diplomacy. He also has a doctorate in theology and has done graduate studies at the Research and Development Center for International Affairs, Weatherhead of the Harvard University.

== Life ==
Harold Caballeros was born in Guatemala City in 1956, son of Osberto Caballeros and Coralia Lopez.

=== Family ===
He has been married 27 years with Cecilia Arimany. They have four children: Harold, Andrea, Christina and David.

=== El Shaddai Ministries ===
Founder of El Shaddai Ministries, which consists of a local church with more than 12,000 members in Guatemala City and more than eighty branch churches in several countries in America and Europe. After serving for over 20 years as Pastor, Caballeros announced his retirement in 2004, with his wife staying as the head of the pastoral team.

=== Radios Vision Corporation ===
He is president and founder of Radios Vision Corporation which consists of 25 radio stations established in 1996.

== Political career ==
In 2007 he started his political career by founding the Vision con Valores Party, VIVA where he serves as secretary general. On August 25 of the same year, he held the party's first general assembly in the Industrial Park in Guatemala City. VIVA is a social movement, rooted in a political party with an ideology of long-term vision and values, based on classical republicanism. It has representation in 22 states (Departamentos)in Guatemala. Currently working on the project National Development Agenda (ADN for its acronym in Spanish), which designs the profile of Guatemala in 2050 and the actions to take to ensure that future.

The ADN provides a model of development for Guatemala, according to its competitive advantages and proper use of the resources it has, taking as reference the values and culture. It is supported by the Centre for Studies and Research for Development in Latin America (CEIDAL) in the design, development, audit and measurement of the implementation of public policies.

== Social Projection ==
=== Foundations ===
Has established two foundations: FUEDES (Fundación Educativa El Shaddai), which has 19 schools in different parts of the country based on Christian education as a mean to inculcate a worldview of values and principles that affect the nation. And Fundación Manos de Amor, an institution that provides comprehensive humanitarian assistance, education and sustainable development projects.

=== Universidad San Pablo de Guatemala ===
On March 23, 2006 founded the Universidad San Pablo de Guatemala (USPG) for which he is the Rector. The University's vision, came from the need for an institution that could contribute to the formation of the society through appropriate education, through which students can impact not only in academia but also on the principles, ethical and moral values. In this way as professionals, can be agents of transformation in the society they live in.

== Literary work ==
He has written several motivational books, personal growth and spiritual formation.

- Caballeros, Harold (1999). De Victoria en Victoria. Betania. ISBN 0-88113-541-0.
- Caballeros, Harold (2002). Dios te invita a soñar. Argentina: Peniel. ISBN 987-9038-84-3.
- Caballeros, Harold (2003). El poder transformador del evangelio de Jesucristo. Argentina: Peniel. ISBN 987-557-011-7.
- Caballeros, Harold and Mell Winger (2005). El poder transformador del avivamiento. Argentina: Peniel. ISBN 987-557-089-3.
