= Minister of Foreign Affairs (Guatemala) =

Minister of Foreign Affairs of the Republic of Guatemala
- Coat of arms of Guatemala

- Flag of Guatemala

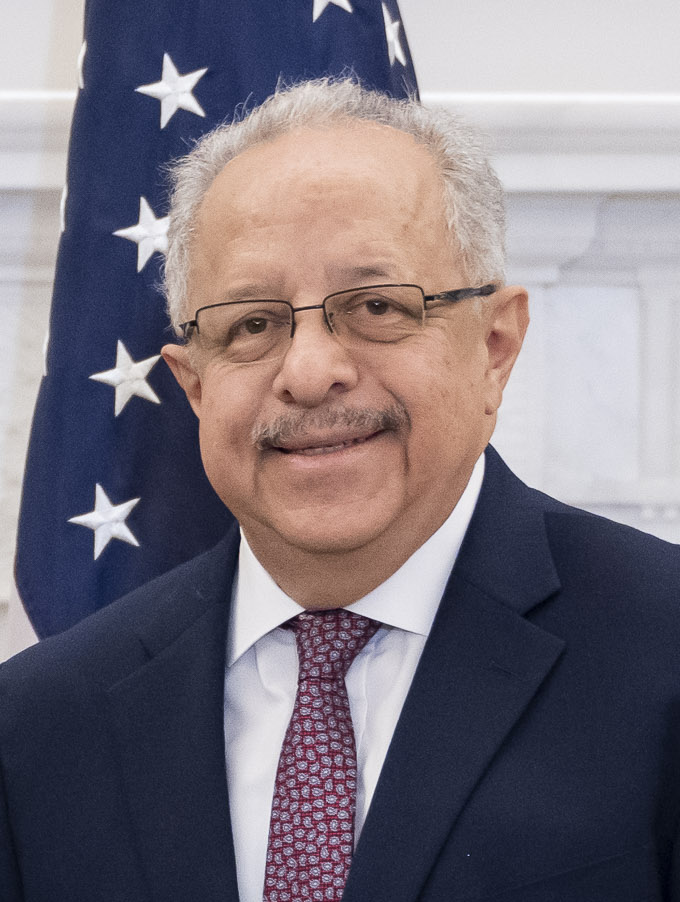
- Incumbent; Carlos Ramiro Martínez since 15 January 2024
- Ministry of Foreign Affairs
- Style: Mr. Minister (informal); His Excellency (alternative formal, diplomatic outside of Guatemala)
- Member of: Cabinet
- Reports to: The president of Guatemala
- Seat: Guatemala City
- Appointer: The president of Guatemala
- Term length: No fixed
- Constituting instrument: Guatemala Constitution
- Inaugural holder: José Milla y Vidaurre
- Formation: March 21, 1847 (179 years ago)
- Unofficial names: Chancellor
- Website: www.minex.gob.gt

This is a list of foreign ministers of Guatemala from 1945 to the present day.

- 1945............ Guillermo Toriello Garrido
- 1945–1947: Eugenio Silva Peña
- 1947–1949: Enrique Muñoz Meany
- 1949–1951: Ismael González Arévalo
- 1951–1952: Manuel Galich
- 1952–1954: José Raúl Osegueda Palala
- 1954............ Guillermo Toriello Garrido
- 1954–1955: Carlos Salazar Gatica
- 1955–1956: Domingo Goicolea Villacorta
- 1956............ Ricardo Quiñónez Lemus
- 1956–1957: Jorge Skinner-Klée
- 1957–1958: Adolfo Molina Orantes
- 1958............ Carlos García Bauer
- 1958–1963: Jesús Víctor Unda Murillo
- 1963–1966: Alberto Herrarte González
- 1966–1969: Emilio Arenales Catalán
- 1969–1970: Alberto Fuentes Mohr
- 1970–1972: Roberto Herrera Ibarguen
- 1972–1974: Jorge Arenales Catalán
- 1974–1978: Adolfo Molina Orantes
- 1978–1982: Rafael Castillo Váldez
- 1982............ Alfonso Alonso Lima
- 1982–1983: Eduardo Castillo Arriola
- 1983–1986: Fernando Andrade Díaz-Durán
- 1986–1987: Mario Rafael Quiñónez Amezquita
- 1987–1989: Alfonso Cabrera Hidalgo
- 1989............ Mario Palencia Lainfiesta
- 1989–1991: Ariel Rivera Irias
- 1991............ Álvaro Arzú
- 1991–1993: Gonzalo Menéndez Park
- 1993–1994: Arturo Fajardo Maldonado
- 1994–1995: Marithza Ruiz de Vielman
- 1995–1996: Alejandro Maldonado
- 1996–2000: Eduardo Stein
- 2000–2002: Gabriel Orellana Rojas
- 2002–2004: Edgar Armando Gutiérrez Girón
- 2004–2006: Jorge Briz Abularach
- 2006–2008: Gert Rosenthal
- 2008–2012: Haroldo Rodas
- 2012–2013: Harold Caballeros
- 2013–2014: Fernando Carrera
- 2014–2017: Carlos Raúl Morales
- 2017–2020: Sandra Jovel
- 2020–2022: Pedro Brolo
- 2022–2024: Mario Búcaro
- 2024–present: Carlos Ramiro Martínez

== Sources ==
- Rulers.org – Foreign ministers E–K
