= Sandra Jovel =

Guatemalan diplomat and government official

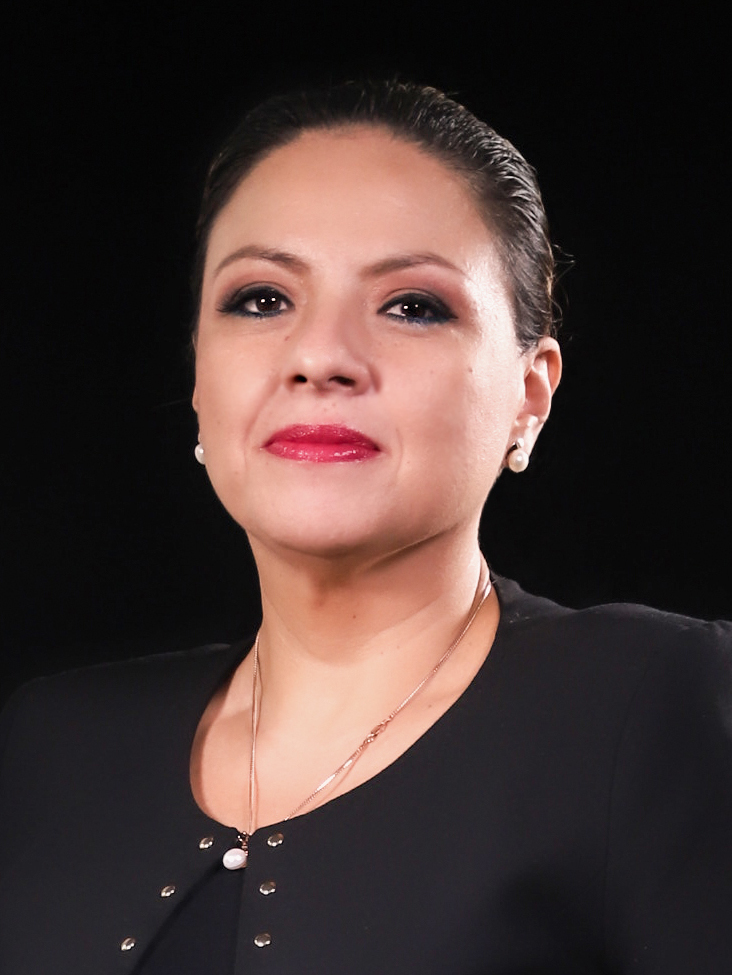
- Official portrait, 2024

Member of the Congress of Guatemala
- Incumbent
- Assumed office 14 January 2024
- Constituency: Guatemala City

Minister of Foreign Affairs
- In office 27 August 2017 – 14 January 2020
- President: Jimmy Morales
- Preceded by: Carlos Raúl Morales
- Succeeded by: Pedro Brolo

Guatemalan Ambassador to Colombia
- In office 1 July 2017 – 27 August 2017
- President: Jimmy Morales
- Preceded by: Héctor Iván Espinoza Farfán
- Succeeded by: Reagan Vega

Personal details
- Born: 24 February 1978 (age 47); Guatemala City, Guatemala
- Political party: Valor

Sandra Erica Jovel Polanco (born 24 February 1978) is a Guatemalan politician and former diplomat who has been serving as a member of Congress since January 2024. She was previously Minister of Foreign Affairs serving from 27 August 2017 to 14 January 2020 under the government of Jimmy Morales.

== Personal life ==
In 2016, she was accused due to anomalies in adoption processes.

== Career ==
Since 2014, Jovel has been Guatemala's Vice-Minister of international affairs in charge of trade, investments, tourism and cooperation. In May 2016, Jovel authorized the exportation from Chile to Guatemala of the Chilean mangos.

On 27 August 2017, president Morales named Jovel as successor to Carlos Raúl Morales and ordered her to immediately comply with the requirements to initiate the expulsion of the Colombian commissioner for UN's CICIG, Iván Velásquez.

On 1 February 2018, she met with Secretary-General of the United Nations António Guterres in New York City. A leaked document revealed that part of their talks was around supposed misdeeds of Iván Velásquez.

== See also ==
- List of foreign ministers in 2017
