= Haroldo Rodas =

Guatemalan politician (1946–2020)

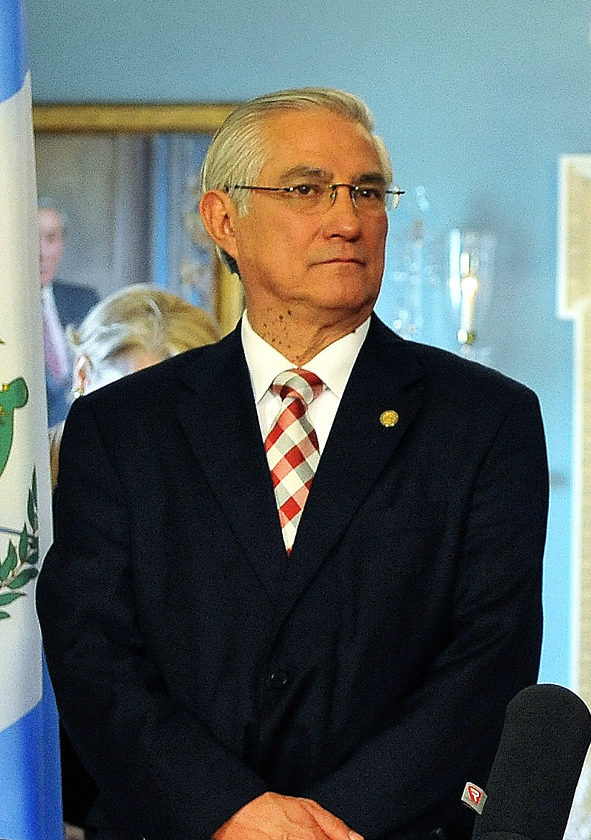
- Rodas in 2011

Minister of Foreign Affairs of Guatemala
- In office 14 January 2008 – 14 January 2012
- President: Álvaro Colom
- Preceded by: Gert Rosenthal
- Succeeded by: Harold Caballeros

Personal details
- Born: Roger Haroldo Rodas Melgar; 29 May 1946 Guatemala City, Guatemala
- Died: 14 June 2020 (aged 74) Guatemala City, Guatemala
- Education: Universidad de San Carlos de Guatemala Graduate Institute of International and Development Studies
- Profession: Economist

Roger Haroldo Rodas Melgar (29 May 1946 – 14 June 2020) was a Guatemalan economist, politician and diplomat who served as Guatemala's Minister of Foreign Affairs from 14 January 2008 to 12 January 2012 under the government of Álvaro Colom.

== Biography ==
He served as the foreign affairs minister in the cabinet of President Álvaro Colom, from 14 January 2008 to 14 January 2012. He was the only minister in the Colom administration who served out the entire four-year term. He had previously served as vice-minister for foreign affairs from 1 January 1991 to 30 June 1992.

Rodas studied economics at the Universidad de San Carlos de Guatemala and a master's in international economics at the Graduate Institute of International Studies in Geneva, Switzerland. Prior to being appointed foreign minister, he had been the Secretary General of the Secretariat for Central American Economic Integration (SIECA) since April 1995.

He also held positions with the United Nations Development Programme, the Inter-American Development Bank, the Union of Banana Exporting Countries, the Organization of American States, and the General Agreement on Tariffs and Trade.

Rodas died from COVID-19 on 14 June 2020, during the COVID-19 pandemic in Guatemala. He was 74, sixteen days short of his 75th birthday.

== Honors ==
- Order of Brilliant Star with Grand Cordon (Republic of China, 2008)
