= International Commission against Impunity in Guatemala =

The International Commission against Impunity in Guatemala (Spanish: Comisión Internacional contra la Impunidad en Guatemala, CICIG) was an international body charged with investigating and prosecuting serious crime in Guatemala. On January 7, 2019, the agreement between the United Nations and Guatemala was terminated by Guatemalan president Jimmy Morales, evoking CICIG's alleged participation in illegal acts, abuse of authority and acts against the constitution. The UN rejected this unilateral termination, and the country's highest law court ruled against the president's decision. CICIG's term was scheduled to end in September 2019. Morales' decision, approved by the country's business elite, triggered an institutional crisis in Guatemala, as the Constitutional court sided with CICIG. Morales is being investigated concerning his campaign financing.

The CICIG helped Guatemalan law enforcement dismantle over 70 criminal structures between 2008 and 2019. According to a 2022 study, this may have prevented between 20,000–30,000 homicides over that period.

== History ==
It was created on December 12, 2006, when the United Nations and Guatemala signed a treaty-level agreement setting up CICIG as an independent body to support the Public Prosecutor's Office (Procuraduría General de la Nación), the National Civilian Police (Policía Nacional Civil) and other state institutions in the investigation of sensitive and difficult cases. The ultimate goal of CICIG's work was to strengthen national judicial institutions, to allow them to continue to confront illegal groups and organized crime in the future. The Commissioner in charge was Iván Velásquez Goméz.

On March 24, 2009, Guatemala's Minister of Foreign Relations, Haroldo Rodas, requested, through a personal letter addressed to the Secretary-General of the United Nations, the extension of CICIG's mandate for an additional two years. The extension was confirmed on April 15, 2009, when Secretary-General Ban Ki-moon sent a personal response to the Minister of Foreign Relations, expressing the UN's desire to have CICIG continue its work supporting national institutions for another two years. In January, President Otto Pérez Molina announced that he would extend CICIG's mandate until the end of his term. The mandate was renewed again in April 2015.

In 2018, Guatemalan President Jimmy Morales announced that he would not renew the mandate of the International Commission against Impunity in Guatemala (CICIG), and ordered the immediate transfer of functions to the Public Ministry and the Ministry of the Interior. The mandate of the UN anti-corruption commission ends on September 3, 2019. In anticipation, President Morales deployed the armed forces near the headquarters of the International Commission against Impunity in Guatemala.

Guatemalan Foreign Minister Sandra Jovel said on 7 January 2019 that the UN body "had 24 hours to leave the country". However, on 9 January 2019, Guatemala's constitutional court suspended the decision "after eight hours of deliberation overnight"

== Objectives ==
CICIG's mandate consists of three principal objectives:

- First, CICIG shall investigate the existence of illicit security forces and clandestine organizations that commit crimes that affect the fundamental human rights of the citizens of Guatemala, and identify the illegal group structures (including links between state officials and organized crime), activities, modes of operation and sources of financing.
- Second, CICIG's professional personnel shall support the work of Guatemalan institutions, principally the Attorney General in his/her work to investigate and prosecute the individuals involved in the illegal groups. Additionally, CICIG will make recommendations to the Government for the adoption of new public policies and procedures directed at the eradication of these groups and will strengthen the state's capacity to protect the basic human rights of its citizens.
- Third, CICIG shall provide technical assistance to legal institutions in order to leave the Public Prosecutor's Office and National Civilian Police better equipped to fight organized crime after the conclusion of CICIG's mandate.

CICIG had the legal ability to support the Public Prosecutor's Office in criminal prosecutions, and participate as a complementary prosecutor (querellante adhesivo), in conformity with Guatemala's Code of Criminal Procedure. CICIG also had legal standing to make administrative complaints against public officials, in particular when the officials have committed acts intended to obstruct its mandate, and it could act as an interested third party in disciplinary procedures initiated against such officials.

In 2008, the General Assembly of the United Nations expressed in its resolution, “The situation in Central America: progress in fashioning a region of peace, freedom, democracy and development”, its appreciation to member states that supported the CICIG and urged them to continue their support. Moreover, the General Assembly expressed its appreciation to Secretary-General Ban Ki-moon for his continued assistance to the commission and request him “to continue to do so in order that the Commission may successfully carry out its mandate and address the challenges that it faces”.

== Investigations ==
Year	Case	Crime	Description
2006–2007	Pavón & PARLACEN	Extrajudicial executions	The CICIG went after hitmen hired by the government of Óscar Berger Perdomo involved in the extrajudicial executions of prisoners held at Prison “Pavón” and “El Infiernito” and the assassination of three Salvadorian diplomats from the parliamentary body of the Central American Integration System.
2008–2009	Alfonso Portillo	Embezzlement	Helped jail ex-president Alfonso Portillo and various military officers for embezzlement and corruption. The ex-ambassador of Taiwan, Andrew Wu, was implicated in the act for the passing checks along to the ex-president. Portillo was sentenced to prison, which he served in Guatemala and the United States, to which he was later extradited. He returned to Guatemala in February 2015.
2008–2012	Adolfo Vivar	Fraud	Helped in the capture and arrest of then-mayor of Antigua Guatemala, Adolfo Vivar, who was the head of a group that committed fraud, robbing the municipality of an estimated Q23 Million in the hiring of companies for false work.
2009	The Rosenberg Case	Homicide	Collaborated in the discovery of the planned suicide of Rodrigo Rosenberg, who filmed a video implicating then-president Álvaro Colom and Sandra Torres if his death were to occur. On July 15, 2010, the conspirators were convicted to 10–12 years in prison.
2012	Marlene Blanco Lapola	Extrajudicial executions	The commission helped in the capture of the ex-Director of the National Civilian Police, Marlene Blanco Lapola, for extrajudicial killings
2013	Dirección General de Migración	Illegal entries	The ICAIG acted against a criminal organization, which issued fake passports to non-citizens, allowed the entry to non-citizens to international airports without documentation, and provided vehicles to the illegal enterers, as a human trafficking organization.
2014	The Mendoza Family	Drug trafficking	The commission announced the arrest of Harold Mendoza, the leader of a drug ring which sold drugs and controlled its own paramilitary force to control market share in Guatemala.
2014	Byron Lima Oliva	Corruption	Helped dismantle an illegal network directed by prisoner Byron Lima Oliva, a former officer in the Guatemalan army, who was in jail for the murder of Archbishop Juan Gerardi. Lima Oliva and 12 more were accused of money laundering, extortion, providing “protection” to local businesses, and transferring prisoners between prisons. Lima Oliva remained the de facto prison system boss in Guatemala despite being arrested, until his assassination in the prison “Pavon” on July 18, 2016, due to, reportedly, internal power struggles.
2015	La Línea Scandal	Customs fraud	The CICIG and the Public Ministry accused 22 government officials of being members of La Linea, a government conspiracy group dedicated to committing fraud. Among them was Juan Carlos Monzón, secretary to Vice-President Roxana Baldetti, and two other officials; the scandal eventually came to implicate the Vice-President and President themselves.
2015	The IGSS-Pisa Case	Contract Fraud	May 20, 2015: The commission discovered the case of corruption within the Guatemalan Social Security Institute; the criminals were arrested for suspicious anomalies in a contract the firm signed with the pharmaceutical company PISA, which involved treating kidney diseases in the country, but which was linked to the deaths of various patients due to deficiencies in treatment, sanitation, and medicine.
2015	The Redes Case	Fraud and industrial espionage	The CICIG and the public prosecution service discovered on July 9, 2015, a case of corruption involving energy companies Jaguar Energy & Zeta Gas and ex-officials from the government of Otto Pérez Molina. The supposed leader of the ring was Cesar Augusto Medina Farfan, who was involved in the Panama Connection during the government of Alfonso Portillo.
2015	Financial eliciting case	Illegal financial eliciting	A case originally handled by the public prosecution service, the CICIG helped with the capture of several officials and auditors of the Tribunal Administration of Guatemala for accepting bribes to benefit the Aceros Corporation in Guatemala, from whom several high-ranking officials were also arrested.
2016	Impunity & Fraud in the SAT	Government fraud	Uncovered by the Department of Justice and the CICIG. On February 12, 2016, various high-level officials and auditors of the Superintendencia de Administración Tributaria de Guatemala, the nation's tax collecting organization, whom had been accused of illegally favoring the company Aceros, from whom several legal representatives were also arrested.
2016	Lake Amatitlán Clean-up Case	Environmental crimes	In February 2016, the commission announced the arrest of 14 individuals central to the fraud involving a planned clean-up of the famed Lake Amatitlan, including Mario Alejandro Baldetti, the brother of ex-Vice President Roxana Baldetti, representatives from the Israeli engineering firm Tarcic Engineering, ex-officials in the ASMA, Authority for the Sustainable Management of Lake Amatitlan, and ex-officials in the Department of the Environment and Natural Resources of Guatemala.
2016	Co-optation of the State of Guatemala	Widespread massive government fraud	Discovered by the Department of Justice and the CICIG on June 2, 2016, the case originally sprung from the investigations led into the then-fledgling La Línea case. The initial wiretapping that formed part of the initial investigation led to the discovery of a fully formed criminal organization which reached then President Otto Pérez Molina and then Vice President Roxanna Baldetti. In subpoenaing seemingly innocuous documents (tax statements), investigators were able to piece together an immense financial scheme, which reported fraud stretching back to 2008. The case also revealed an intricately connected money laundering scheme meant to enrich the Partido Patriota, whose platform captured the government in 2011; the scheme continued until the resignation of the President and most of his associated cabinet. In this way, various government institutions were co-opted by the scheme which used its widespread network to illegally enrich its colluders.

== Campaign finance in Guatemala ==
On July 16, 2015, the CICIG presented a report on the state of political finance in Guatemala, in which it argued that the current financing structure in Guatemalan politics was, by default, illegal. Legislation regarding campaign finance in Guatemala is lax at best, and the government does not require campaigns and organizations to disclose origins of financial donations nor does it prohibit the accepting of donations from entities linked to illegal practices. Thus, the report highlighted that most of Guatemala's political organizations would be involved in illegal campaign finance.

== Criticism ==
The commission has been subject to criticism for many years from many different entities. One notable critic has been the Partido Socialista Centroamericano (Central American Socialist Party), which accused the commission of being an agent of the United States and the European Union to guarantee the functionality of the “capitalist state” in Guatemala. The entity has been further accused of working to end corruption in Guatemala inasmuch as it allows for foreign interests to continue unimpeded. Other critiques have come from entities disgruntled at some of the earlier cases the commission took on, in which direct retribution against illegally acting agents was deemed insufficient.

== See also ==
- Guatemala Human Rights Commission
- United Nations
- Rodrigo Rosenberg Marzano
- La Línea corruption case
- Otto Pérez Molina
- Alfonso Portillo
