= Ministry of Foreign Affairs (Guatemala) =

Government ministry of Guatemala

Ministry of Foreign Affairs of Guatemala — MINEX —
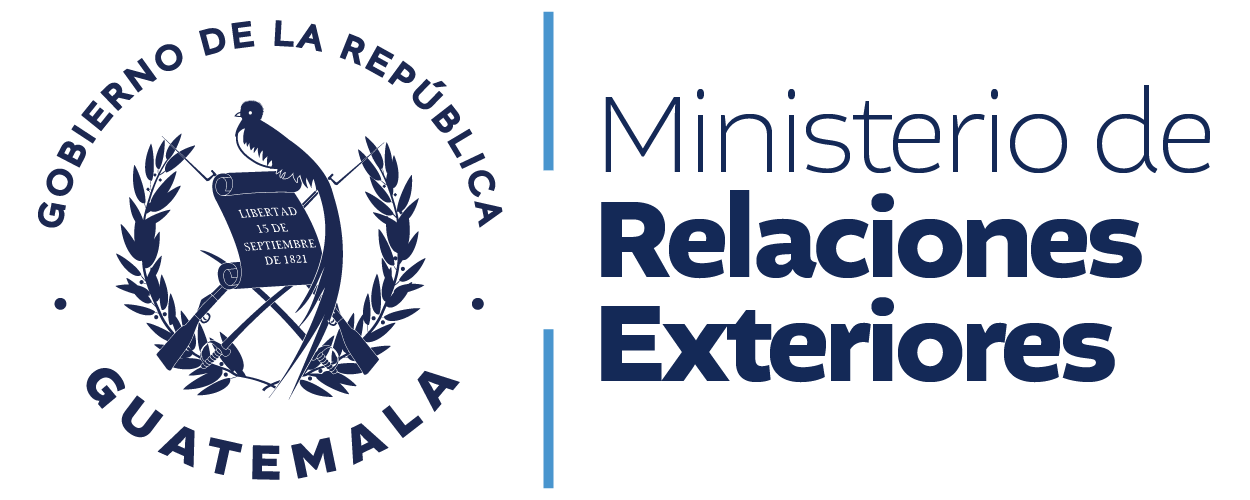
- Current logo

Agency overview
- Formed: December 27, 1944; 81 years ago
- Jurisdiction: Government of Guatemala
- Headquarters: 2da avenida 4-17 zona 10; Guatemala City, Guatemala; 14°36′34″N 90°30′49″W
- Agency executive: Carlos Ramiro Martínez, Foreign Affairs Minister
- Website: www.minex.gob.gt

The Ministry of Foreign Affairs (Spanish: Ministerio de Relaciones Exteriores, MINEX) of Guatemala is the executive office in charge of conducting the international relations of the country. This ministry can give the Guatemalan nationality, enforces the immigration laws of the country, preserves the national limits and boundaries, negotiates international treaties and agreements with other countries and preserves the copies of the ones signed by Guatemala. It is appointed by law to preserve the national interests overseas and to be part of the National Security System.

== Background and history ==
Starting in the 19th century, right after independence from Spain was signed, the public administration was slowly organized. There was a first stage when Guatemala was a part of the United Provinces of Central America, and a second stage starting in 1847, when Guatemala became an independent, free and sovereign republic to administer its own public affairs. Through that time, the different executive offices were organized as "secretariats", following the Spanish nomenclature. This terminology included the Secretariat of Foreign Affairs, which kept its name until after the Revolution of 1944. Decree #47, passed by the Revolutionary Joint on December 27, 1944, still used this category. However, when the new Constitution came into force on March 15, 1945, the Constitutional system created the Ministries of State. For that reason, Congress passed a bill for the organization of the Executive Branch, which first spoke of a Foreign Affairs Ministry, on April 25, 1945.

== Foreign affairs ==
Currently, Guatemala holds diplomatic relations with 152 countries. It has 41 embassies throughout the World, and 4 missions in International Organizations.

Embassy	Ambassador extraordinary and plenipotentiary
Argentina	Rony Abiú Chalí López
Australia	Connie Taracena Secaira
Austria	Antonio Roberto Castellanos López
Belgium	José Alberto Briz Gutiérrez
Belize	
Brazil	Julio Armando Martini Herrera
Canada	Carlos Humberto Jiménez Licona
Chile	Blanca Rita Claverie de Scioli
Colombia	
Costa Rica	Juan Carlos Orellana Juárez
Cuba	Héctor Iván Espinoza Farfán
Dominican Republic	Rudy Armando Coxaj López
Ecuador	Luigi William Ixcot Rojas
Egypt	Luis Raúl Estévez López
El Salvador	Luis Rolando Torres Casanova
France	Francisco Gross-Hernández Kramer
Germany	José Francisco Calí Tzay
Holy See	Alfredo Vásquez Rivera
Honduras	Melvin Armindo Valdez González
India	Geovani René Castillo Polanco
Indonesia	Jacobo Cuyún Salguero
Israel	Atzum Arévalo de Moscoso
Italy	
Japan	Ángela María de Lourdes Chávez Bietti
Mexico	Arturo Romeo Duarte Ortiz
Morocco	
Netherlands	Gladys Marithza Ruiz de Vielman
Nicaragua	
Panama	Pedro Amado Robles Valle
Peru	Irma Verónica Araujo Samayoa
Russia	Guisela Atalida Godínez Sazo
South Korea	Sara Angelina Solís Castañeda
Spain	Fernando Molina Girón
Sweden	Georges De La Roche Du Ronzet Plihal
Switzerland	Luis Fernando Carranza Cifuentes
Taiwan	Olga María Aguja Zúñiga
Trinidad and Tobago	Mario Estuardo Torres Townson
Turkey	Lars Henrik Pira Pérez
United Kingdom	Acisclo Domingo Valladares Molina
United States	Manuel Alfredo Espina Pinto
Uruguay	Antonio Arenales Forno
Venezuela	Sandra América Noriega Urizar

Mission	Ambassador extraordinary and plenipotentiary
OAS	Gabriel Edgardo Aguilera Peralta
WTO	
UN (New York)	Jorge Skinner-Klee Arenales
UN (Geneva)	Carla María Rodríguez Mancia

== See also ==
- Minister of Foreign Affairs (Guatemala) for a list of foreign ministers from 1945 to the present day.
