= Jorge Briz Abularach =

Guatemalan politician

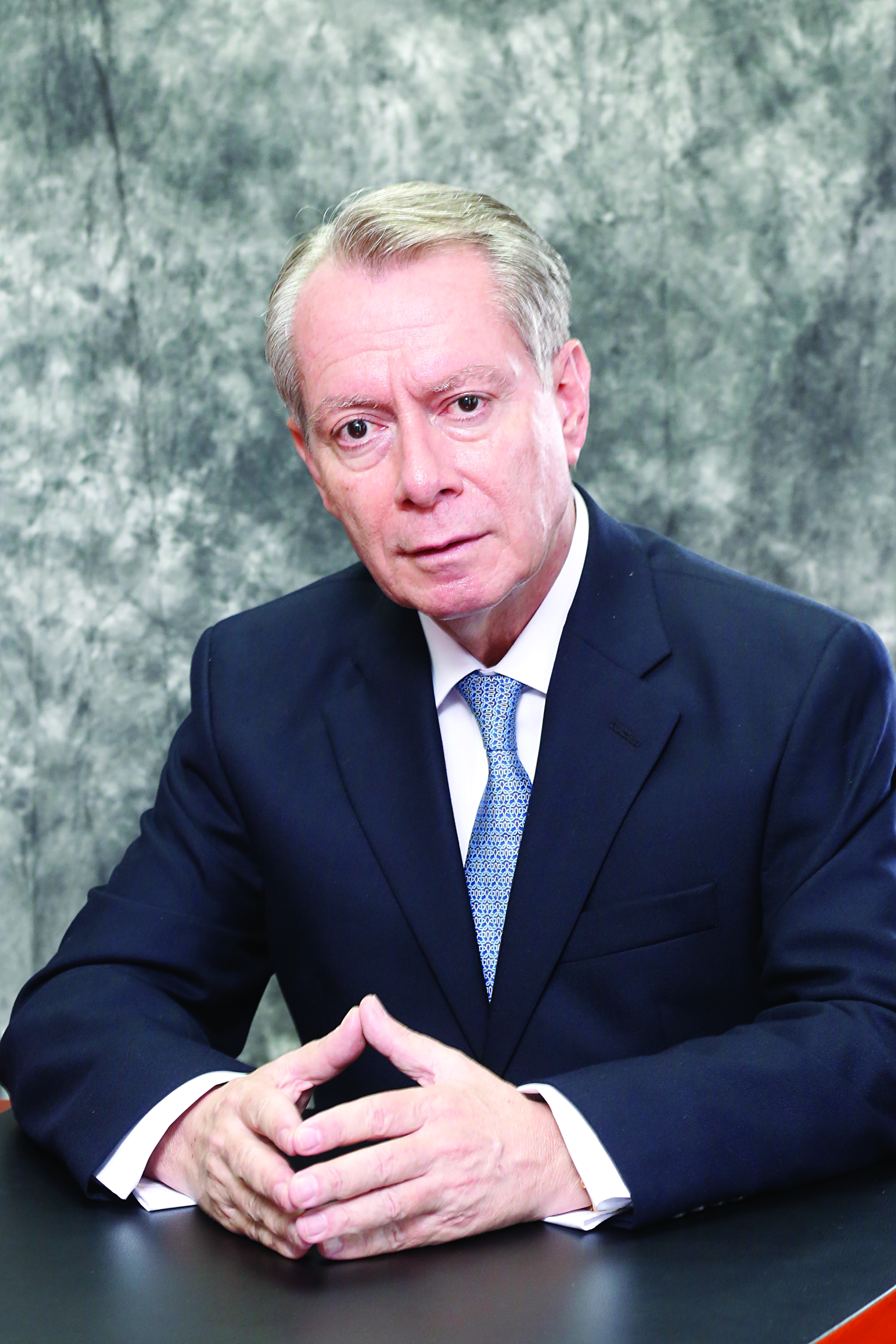
Briz in 2015

Jorge Briz Abularach (born 27 September 1955) is a Guatemalan politician who served as Guatemala's Minister of Foreign Affairs from 14 January 2004 to 25 July 2006 under the government of Óscar Berger. He currently serves as president of Guatemala's Chamber of Commerce.

== See also ==
- Ministry of Foreign Affairs (Guatemala)
- Minister of Foreign Affairs (Guatemala)
- Politics of Guatemala
