= Julio Ligorría =

Guatemalan diplomat

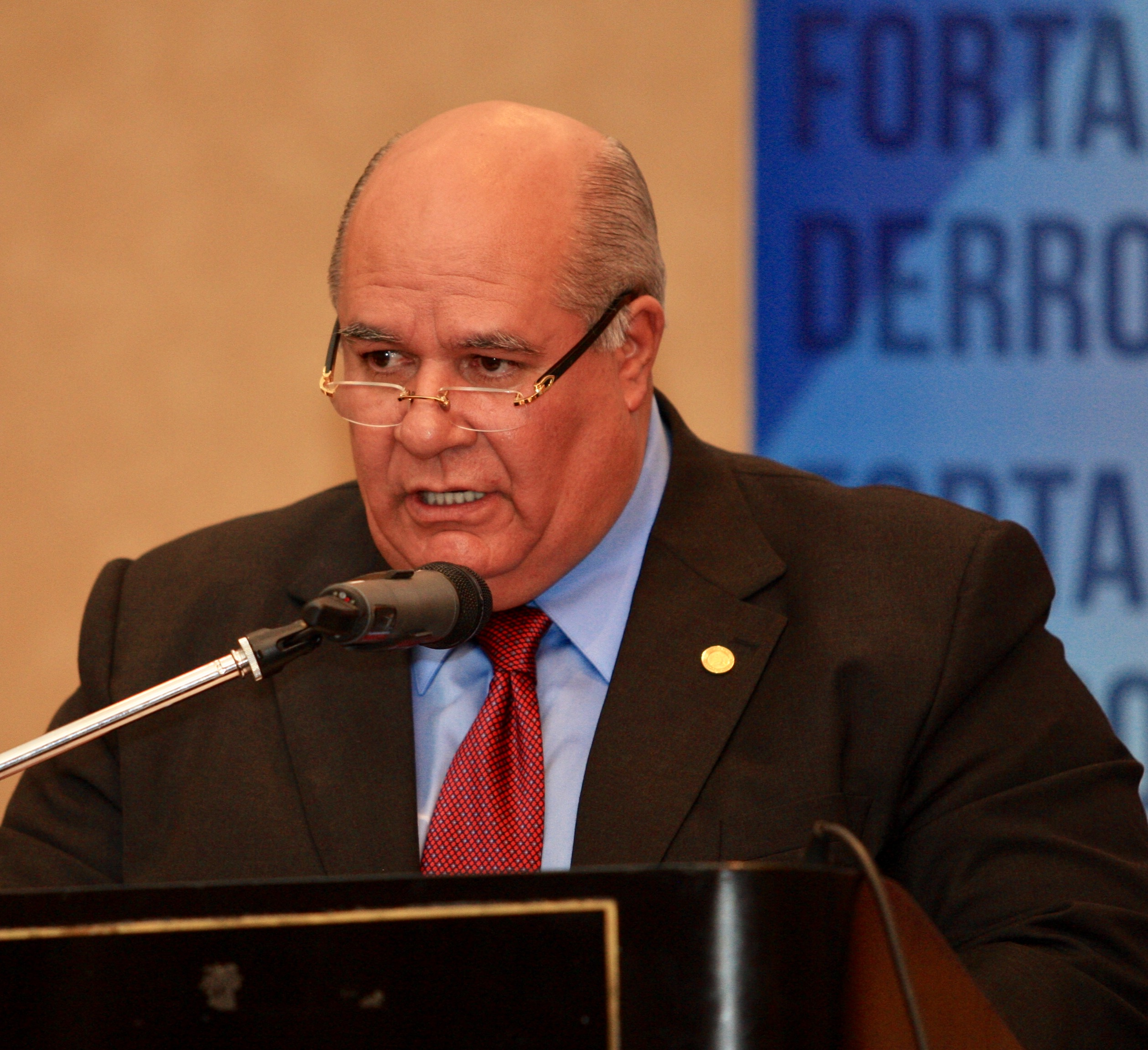
- Ligorría in 2016

Guatemala Ambassador to the United States
- In office September 2013 – December 2015
- Preceded by: Francisco Villagrán de León
- Succeeded by: Maritza Ruiz de Vielman

Personal details
- Born: February 19, 1956 (age 70) Guatemala City, Guatemala
- Spouse(s): Elizabeth Bianchi Toriello (1958–2008); Maria Olga Quezada

Julio Ligorría Carballido (Guatemala City, Guatemala, February 19, 1956) is a Guatemalan diplomat who served as ambassador of Guatemala in United States from September 2013 to November 2015. He previously worked as a crisis-management and political consultant.

Ligorría, received the 2015 Reed Latino Award for handling the migratory crisis of unaccompanied children who arrived at the southern border of the United States.

On September 26, 2017, Ligorría was arrested in Spain on charges that he laundered approximately $2 million in connection with Otto Perez Molina's presidential campaign.

== Biography ==
He began his public life in 1979, when he became general manager of the Association of Managers of Guatemala position that he held until the year 1983. During the dictatorship of the General Fernando Romeo Lucas García, he founded the first Civic Forum in the history of the country of candidates for the presidency, which over the years was institutionalized as the presidential forum of the Association of Managers of Guatemala. Later in the year 1983, he became the Vice President of the Chamber of Free Enterprise until 1985. Two years later, he joined the Advisory Committee of the International Center for Private Enterprise. In 1988 he founded the Interimage Latinoamericana SA, which provides consulting services in communications and public affairs to multinational companies and governments throughout Latin America. He presided over this company until August 2013. He worked as a consultant for the Chancellor of Guatemala in 1993 in charge of re-launching the peace negotiations plan in Guatemala.

== Personal life ==
Julio Ligorría was born in a family integrated by liberal professionals who dedicated themselves to commerce and industry in his hometown of Quetzaltenango and later moved to Guatemala City . His father Julio R. Ligorria Guzmán and his mother Amada Carballido de Ligorría both Guatemalans. In 1979 Julio Ligorría Carballido married Elizabeth Bianchi Toriello (Guatemalan-American, 1958–2008) and they had three children. In 2013, Ligorría formalized her relationship with María Olga Quezada, a psychologist specialist in speech therapy and a mother of five children. In his early years, he was a recognized professor called to participate in Political Management and Strategy seminars such as: Florida International University, Latin American and Caribbean Center Instituto Tecnológico de Monterrey in Mexico City, Universidad Iberoamericana de México for the Diploma in Political Management in charge of the subject of Government Communication, Graduate School of Political Management at George Washington University and International Center for Government and Political Marketing of the Camilo José Cela University, Madrid, Spain.

== Acknowledgments ==
As ambassador, the magazine 'Campaigns & Elections′ awarded him the Reed Latino 2015 prize in the category "Best management of electoral crisis or of the government". The nomination of Ligorría was due to the work he developed as ambassador from Guatemala in Washington during the humanitarian crisis of unaccompanied migrant children who traveled from Central America to the United States in the summer of 2014. In 2001, he was declared an Honorary Rotarian by the Rotary Club of Guatemala City for his contributions to the consolidation of the system democratic in Guatemala.

In 2000 he received the prize of the Latin American Association of Political Consultants ALACOP 2000. In 1999, Third place in the V prize of Liberalism in Latin America of the Friedrich Naumann Foundation for his essay Equality Before the Law, the Key Challenge. In 1996, the Monja Blanca Order was conferred on the rank of 1st Class, for its contributions to the consolidation of democracy in Guatemala.

In 1987 he won the Ludwig Von Mises Prize awarded by the Center for Free Enterprise of Mexico for his essay on Right and Freedom in America.

In 1983 he was declared a Distinguished Neighbor by the Mayor of Guatemala City, for his work in coordinating the National and International Information for Pope John Paul II, in his first visit to Guatemala.

== Problems for Ligorría ==
In 1985, during the political participation of Ligorría in pursuit of democracy, the forces of the military regime threw grenades at his residence. Ligorría and his family left unharmed, although the material damages were numerous. In February 1988 Ligorria was invited to participate in the coup d'état against Vinicio Cerezo. After denying this offer, Ligorría received threats and persecutions so he decided to leave the country with his family to a self-imposed exile that lasts until 1993.

On June 13, 2018, Spain's National Court denied Guatemala's request for extradition on the grounds of money laundering stating, . "We must conclude that the facts, as they appear described in the application (of extradition), are not in principle constituting a crime of money laundering under our domestic law". The Spanish Court is leaving the case open for a possible investigation into the former ambassador in Spain and explains that Guatemalan authorities can file a complaint that, if deemed appropriate, could result in a complaint by the Prosecutor for "the possible prosecution of the facts before the Spanish courts. "

At the beginning, he was falsely accused of illicit electoral financing in a case that involved one of the telephone companies that was a client of Julio Ligorria's consulting firm, in which case the manager of that communication's company appeared as the main responsible of the crime. Julio Carlos Porras Zadik, at the end of a legal process brought by CICIG and the Attorney General in the courts of Guatemala, Julio Carlos Porras Zadik, manager of CLARO, pleaded guilty and fully responsible for the crime, exonerating any member of the company including his advisers among which was Julio Ligorría who has always maintained his innocence.

Later CICIG and the Attorney General's office raised a new case against Julio Ligorria, this time, the prosecutors based it on a false press release, where Julio Ligorría was accused of money laundering via services that his company, which has more than twenty years of experience in the field of consulting, had lent to companies of a former government official.

The real issue is that Julio Ligorria's company, not him individually, in fact had provided services to these companies and all of which had physical proof of having been delivered, as well as the receipts and checks of the transactions duly notarized and the taxes paid.

Regarding the latter case, which was never related to Otto Pérez's campaign, it was that the National Audience in Spain ruled that the evidence presented by the Guatemalan public prosecutor was not an offense under Spanish law.

== Publications ==
He has published more than 1,600 political analysis essays in Latin American newspapers and magazines.

Co-author of the book The Art of Winning Elections. Latin American Association of Political Consultants. 2000

Julio Ligorría. Paths of Freedom, VanColor. 1987

Julio Ligorria. Political Strategy from the operational design. Cánovas del Castillo Foundation. 2002

Julio Ligorria. Crisis: The administration of the unexpected. Planet 2016 Ebook. ISBN 9786070735806
