= Carlos Ramiro Martínez =

Guatemalan diplomat (born 1958)

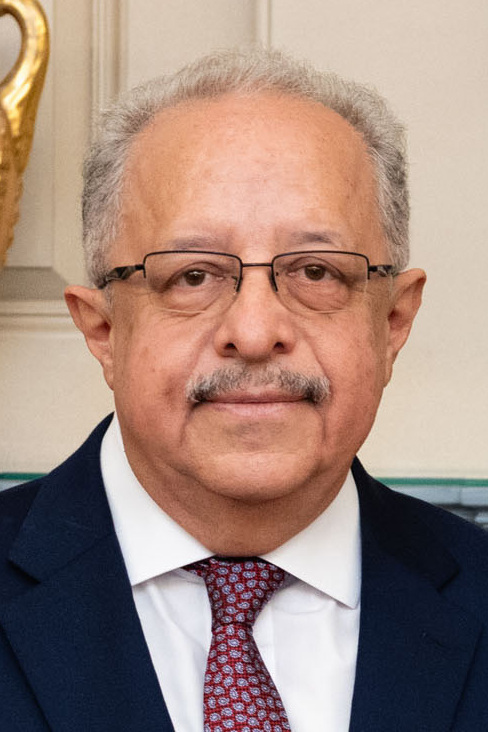
- Martínez in 2024

Minister of Foreign Affairs
- Incumbent
- Assumed office 15 January 2024
- President: Bernardo Arévalo
- Preceded by: Mario Búcaro Flores

Ambassador of Guatemala to Argentina
- In office 2011–2015
- President: Otto Pérez Molina
- Succeeded by: José Arturo Rodríguez Díaz

Personal details
- Born: Carlos Ramiro Martínez Alvarado; 13 September 1958 (age 68) Guatemala City, Guatemala
- Party: Independent
- Education: University of San Carlos of Guatemala
- Occupation: Diplomat

Carlos Ramiro Martínez Alvarado (born 13 September 1958) is a Guatemalan diplomat serving as the minister of foreign affairs of Guatemala since 15 January 2024. He previously served as vice minister of foreign affairs under the governments of Alejandro Giammattei, Alejandro Maldonado, Óscar Berger and Ramiro de León Carpio and as the ambassador to Argentina and Paraguay under the government of Otto Pérez Molina.

== Biography ==
Martínez Alvarado was born on 13 September 1958 in Guatemala City. He graduated with a degree in international relations from the University of San Carlos. He also obtained a specialization in Italy. Apart from his native Spanish, he speaks English, French and Italian.

He joined the Guatemalan Ministry of Foreign Affairs in the 1990s and began holding several important positions such as the deputy director of multilateral policy and director of integration. Later he was appointed as Guatemala's ambassador to the United Nations Office and other international organizations in Geneva. He was the ambassador to Argentina and Paraguay.

He was the vice minister of foreign affairs of Guatemala from 1994 to 1995, 2004 to 2006, 2015 to 2017 and 2020 to 2022. He left office as viceminister in February 2022 and was appointed ambassador to Italy. Although Italian President Sergio Mattarella had given his approval for the nomination, Martínez did not take office.

=== Minister of Foreign Affairs ===
In the second transition meeting with the outgoing government of Alejandro Giammattei, Martínez was appointed by the president-elect Bernardo Arévalo as a member of the transition team and since then he has been in charge of the issue related to foreign policy. He has accompanied the president-elect on his trips abroad. On 9 January 2024, he was nominated as Minister of Foreign Affairs. He assumed office on 15 January 2024.

In February 2024, Martínez stated that Guatemala is considering establishing formal trade relations with China while maintaining existing relations with Taiwan.
