= Order of precedence in Guatemala =

Relative preeminence of officials for ceremonial purposes

The order of precedence in Guatemala is a symbolic hierarchy of officials used to direct protocol. It is regulated by Presidential Decree 07-2003 of March 11, 2003. signed by then President Alfonso Portillo, President of the Congress Efraín Ríos Montt and Former Interior Minister José Adolfo Reyes Calderón.

== Order of precedence ==
Precedence is determined by the office; names of incumbents as of 2024 are listed.

1. President: Bernardo Arévalo
2. Vice President: Karin Herrera
3. President of the Congress: Samuel Pérez Álvarez
4. President of the Supreme Court of Justice: Óscar Cruz Oliva
5. President of the Constitutional Court: Héctor Perez Aguilera
6. President of the Supreme Electoral Tribunal: Blanca Alfaro
7. Former Presidents or their widows/widowers (ordered by term):
  1. Vinicio Cerezo
  2. Jorge Serrano Elías
  3. Alfonso Portillo
  4. Óscar Berger
  5. Otto Pérez Molina
  6. Alejandro Maldonado
  7. Jimmy Morales
  8. Alejandro Giammattei
8. Former Vice Presidents or their widows/widowers:
  1. Luis Alberto Flores
  2. Eduardo Stein
  3. Rafael Espada
  4. Roxana Baldetti
  5. Jafeth Cabrera
  6. Alfonso Fuentes Soria
  7. Guillermo Castillo Reyes
9. Diplomatic corps accredited in Guatemala and accredited diplomatic corps of Guatemala
10. Board of directors of the Congress
  1. First Vice President of the Congress: Boris Roberto España Cáceres
  2. Second Vice President of the Congress: Sergio David Arana Roca
  3. Third Vice President of the Congress: Hérber Armando Melgar Padilla
  4. First Secretary of the Congress: Mynor Gabriel Mejía Popol
  5. Second Secretary of the Congress: Marvin Estuardo Alvarado Morales
  6. Third Secretary of the Congress: Douglas Rivero Mérida
  7. Fourth Secretary of the Congress: Aníbal Estuardo Rojas Espino
  8. Fifth Secretary of the Congress: Leopoldo Salazar Samayoa
11. State ministers and secretaries
  1. Minister of Foreign Affairs: Mario Búcaro
  2. Minister of Interior: Byron Bor
  3. Minister of National Defense: Henry Reyes Chigua
  4. Minister of Public Finances: Edwin Cameros
  5. Minister of Communications, Infrastructure and Housing: Javier Maldonado Quiñonez
  6. Minister of Education: Claudia Ruiz Casasola
  7. Minister of Agriculture, Livestock and Food: Edgar René De León Moreno
  8. Minister of Economy: Luz Pérez Contreras
  9. Minister of Public Health and Social Assistance: Francisco Coma
  10. Minister of Labor and Social Welfare: Rafael Eugenio Rodríguez Pellecer
  11. Minister of Energy and Mines: Alberto Pimentel Mata
  12. Minister of Culture and Sports: Felipe Amado Aguilar Marroquín
  13. Minister of Environment and Natural Resources Environment and Natural Resources: Gerson Elias Barrios Garrido
  14. Minister of Social Development: Héctor Melvyn Caná Rivera
  15. Secretaries of State
12. Deputies of the Congress
13. Attorney General of the Nation: Wuelmer Ubener Gómez González
14. Attorney General and Chief of Public Prosecutor's Office: María Consuelo Porras
15. Attorney for Human Rights: Alejandro Córdova Herrera
16. Comptroller General of Accounts: Frank Helmuth Bode Fuentes
17. Chief of Staff of the Army: Wiliam Arnulfo López Chay
18. Magistrates of the Supreme Court of Justice
19. Judges of the Constitutional Court
20. Magistrates of the Supreme Electoral Tribunal
21. Deputy Ministers of State
22. Departmental Governors
23. Mayors
24. Rectors of the Universities
  1. Rector of the University of San Carlos of Guatemala: Walter Mazariegos Biolis
25. General directors of State entities
26. Army Officers
27. Official Commissions
28. Private Commissions
