= May 2015 Guatemalan vice presidential election =

2015 vice presidential election

- 14 May 2015
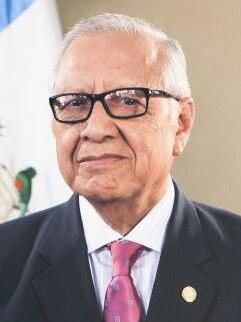

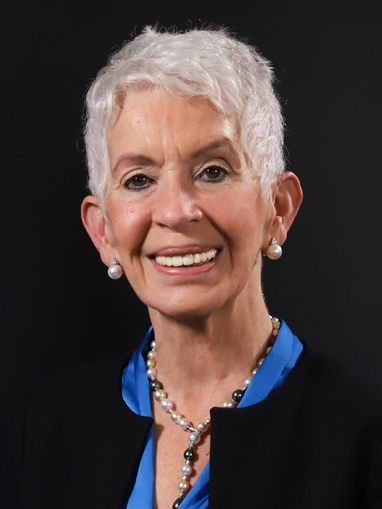

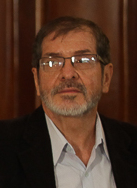
Nominee	Alejandro Maldonado	Adela de Torrebiarte	Adrián Zapata
Party	Independent	Independent	Independent
Electoral vote	115	10	2
Percentage	75.7%	6.9%	1.4%
Vice President before election
Roxana Baldetti
PP
Elected Vice President
Alejandro Maldonado
Independent

Vice presidential elections were held in Guatemala on 14 May 2015. Baldetti resigned from her post as vice president on May 8, 2015, after a U.N. anti-corruption investigation arrested 24 individuals, including her personal secretary Juan Carlos Monzón Rojas, for involvement in an import bribery scheme known as La Línea (the Line) in which officials received bribes to reduce duties paid by importers. Baldetti was detained on fraud charges on August 21, 2015, while at the hospital. Reportedly, wiretaps of those implicated in the scandals appears to refer to her involvement with references to "the R", "the No.2" and "the lady." Her arrest was followed by allegations by prosecutor Thelma Aldana against President Molina, and protests calling for his resignation.

Maldonado was elected Vice President by Congress on May 14, 2015, after his predecessor, Roxana Baldetti, resigned amid allegations of corruption. Before becoming vice president, he served as a constitutional judge, congressional deputy, ambassador to the United Nations, and political leader, including a failed presidential bid in 1982. He was Minister of Education from 1970 to 1974 and Minister of Foreign Affairs from 1995 to 1996.

== Candidates ==
- Alejandro Maldonado: Magistrate of the Constitutional Court since 1986.
- Adela Camacho de Torrebiarte: Commissioner for Police Reform since 2012.
- Adrián Zapata: Presidential Commissioner for Integral Rural Development since 2012.
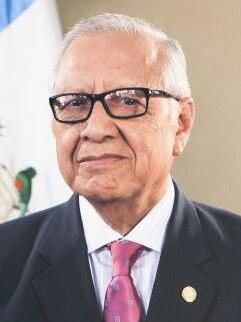
Alejandro Maldonado,
Magistrate of the Constitutional Court since 1986

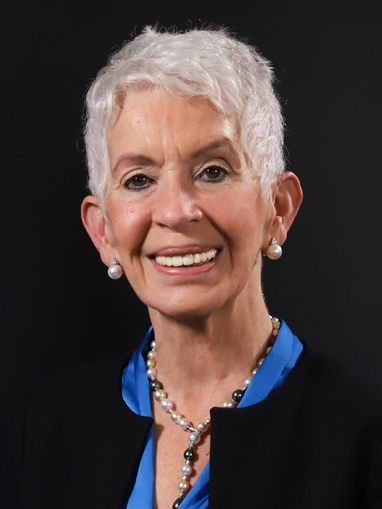
Adela de Torrebiarte,
Commissioner for Police Reform since 2012

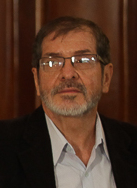
Adrián Zapata,
Presidential Commissioner for Integral Rural Development since 2012

== Results ==
Candidate	Party	first round	votes of discourage
Alejandro Maldonado	PP—Lider—Todos—PRI—VIVA—UCN—Creo—Gana—EG—Independients	115	29
Adela de Torrebiarte	UNE	10	134
Adrián Zapata	URNG Winaq	2	142
Carlos Contreras	Eliminated		
Oliverio García Rodas	Eliminated		
No votes		14	
Total		158	
