= September 2015 Guatemalan vice presidential election =

- September 16, 2015
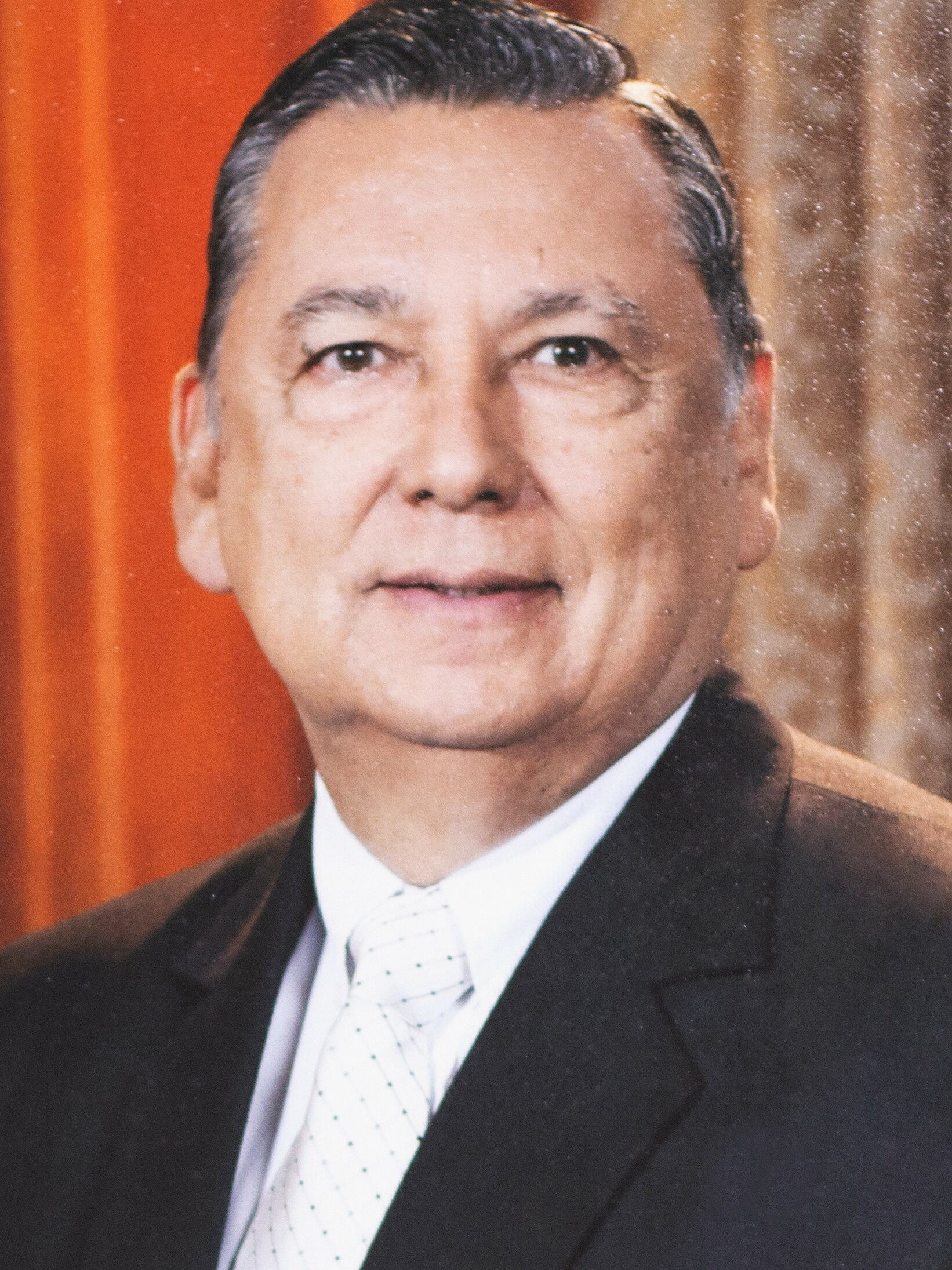

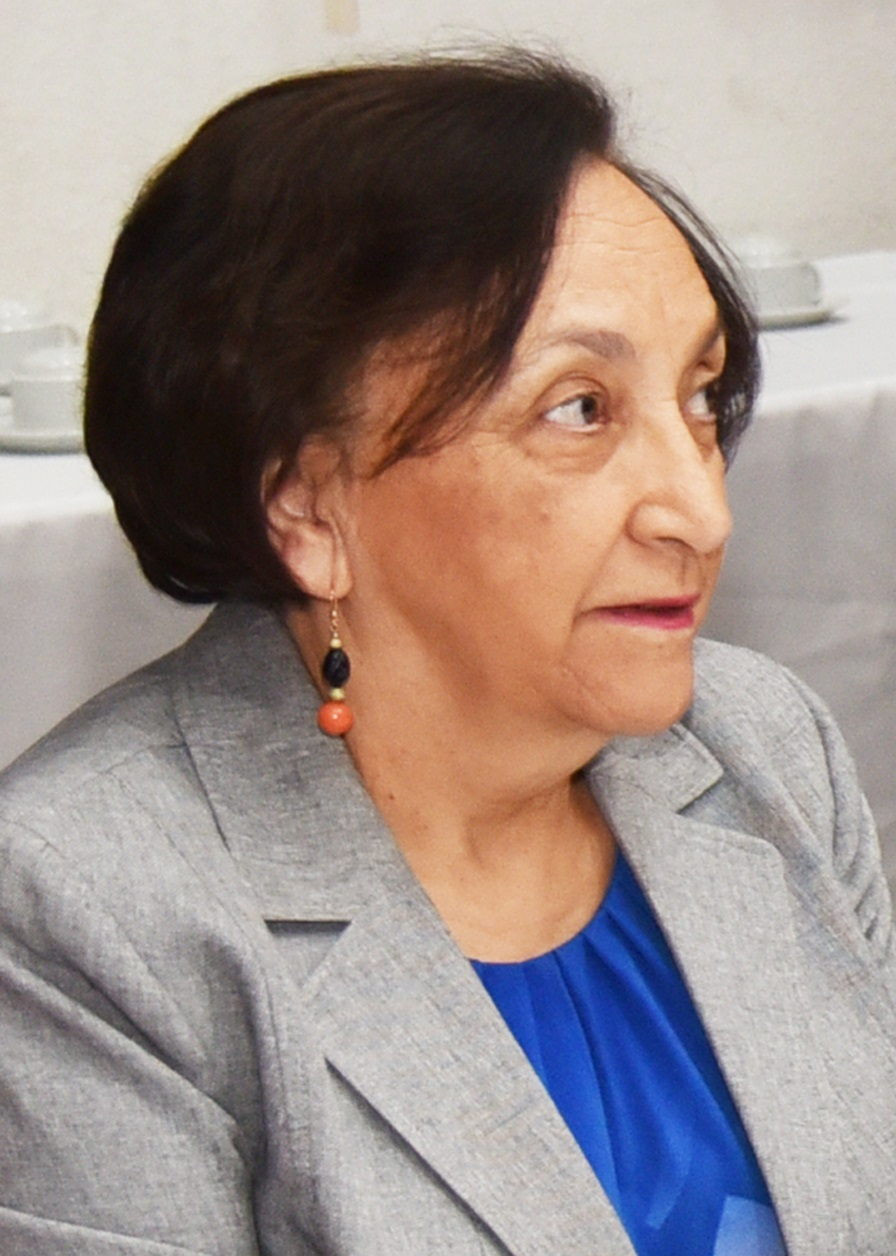
Nominee	Alfonso Fuentes	Raquel Zelaya
Party	Independent	Independent
Electoral vote	109	44
Percentage	71.2%	28.7%
Vice President before election
Alejandro Maldonado
Independent
Elected Vice President
Alfonso Fuentes
Independent

Vice presidential elections were held in Guatemala on September 16, 2015. In April 2015, international prosecutors, with help from the UN, presented evidence of a customs corruption ring ("La Línea") in which discounted tariffs were exchanged for bribes from importers; prosecutors learned of the ring through wiretaps and financial statements. Vice President Roxana Baldetti resigned on 8 May, and was arrested for her involvement on 21 August. On 21 August, Guatemalan prosecutors presented evidence of Pérez's involvement in the corruption ring. Congress, in a 132–0 vote, stripped Pérez Molina of prosecutorial immunity on 1 September 2015, and, on 2 September, he presented his resignation from the Presidency.

On 3 September, after a court hearing in which charges and evidence against him were presented, he was arrested and sent to the Matamoros prison in Guatemala City. Vice President Alejandro Maldonado Aguirre was appointed to serve the remainder of Pérez's 4-year term in office (due to end on 14 January 2016).

Alfonso Fuentes Soria was elected Acting Vice President of Guatemala, following the Congress of Guatemala's.

== Results ==
Candidate	Party	First round	Second round	Third round
Alfonso Fuentes Soria		79	71	109
Raquel Zelaya		59	75	44
Gabriel Medrano		51	retired	retired
No votes		5	5	5
Total		153	153	153
