= Angola–Guatemala relations =

Angola-Guatemala relations
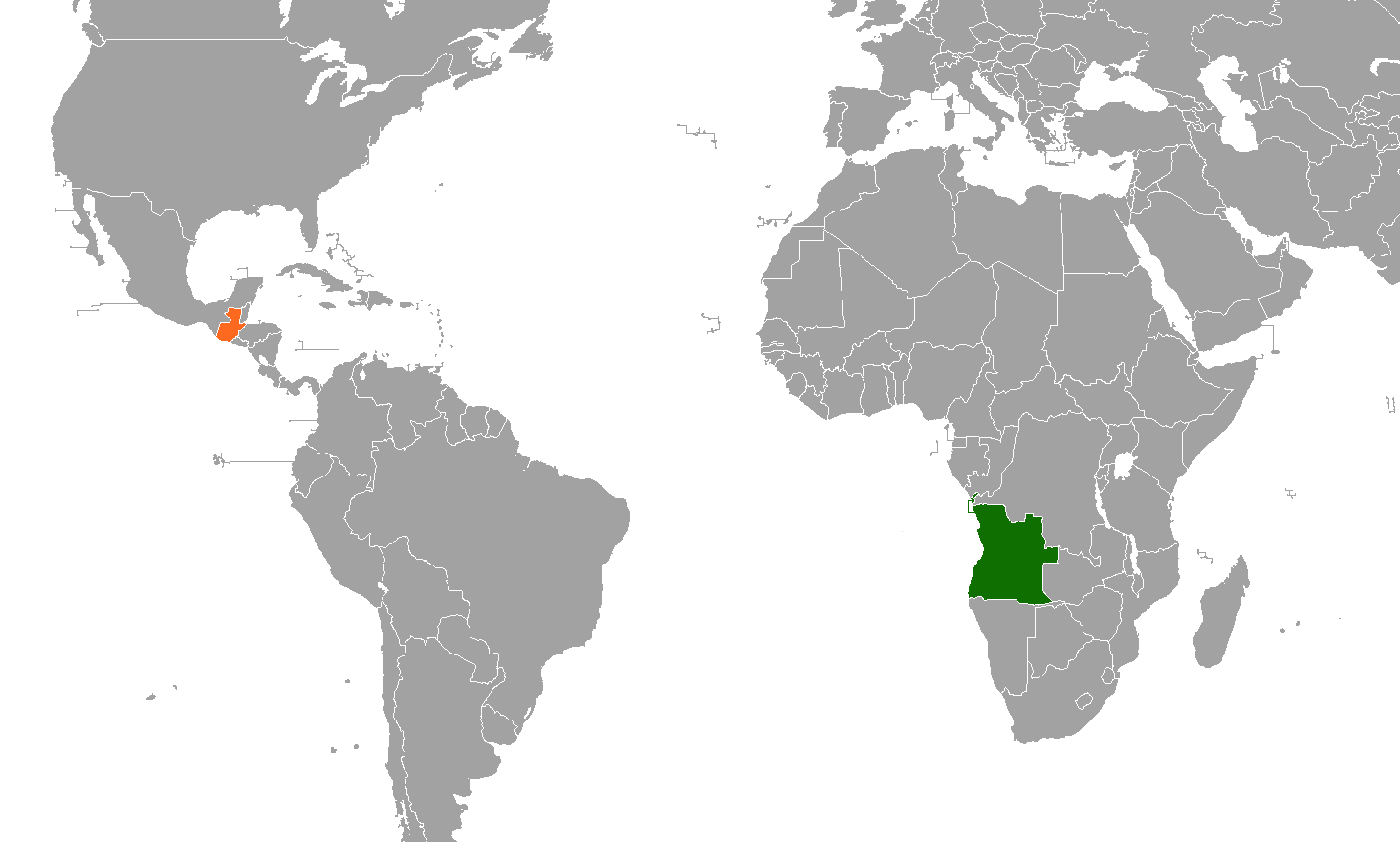
- Angola: Guatemala

Angola–Guatemala relations are the bilateral relations between Angola and Guatemala. The two countries have not established diplomatic relations with each other.

== History ==
Guatemala does not maintain diplomatic relations with almost 38 countries, the vast majority of which are in Africa and Asia, including Angola.

In 2011, the vice presidents of Angola and Guatemala, Fernando da Piedade Dias dos Santos and Rafael Espada respectively, coincided on a visit to Cuba. Later in 2015, the government of Guatemala began a process of dialogue with the government of Angola, but so far no agreement has been reached.

== Trade ==
In 2023, bilateral trade between Angola and Guatemala remained minimal, totaling approximately $0.2 million. Angola's exports to Guatemala were valued at around $5,280, comprising primarily iron housewares and suits. Conversely, Guatemala exported approximately $216,000 worth of goods to Angola, with the main products being non-knit active wear ($64,000), and cars ($46,500). The composition of this limited trade volume has changed widely over the years. Prior to 2020, Guatemala exported raw sugar to Angola.

== See also ==
- Foreign relations of Angola
- Foreign relations of Guatemala
