= Menaldo =

Menaldo is a surname of Hispanic origin. Notable people with the surname include:

- Kévin Menaldo (born 1992), French pole vaulter
- Luis Francisco Ortega Menaldo (born 1943), Guatemalan intelligence official

== See also ==
- Renaldo
