= 2015 Guatemalan protests =

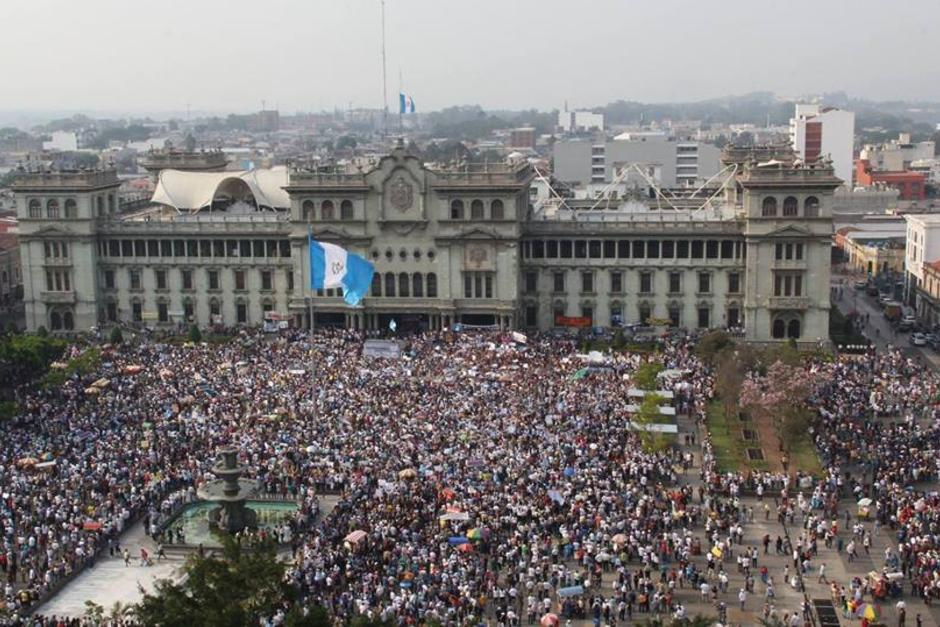
- Massive Demonstrations on 25 April in Guatemala City
- Date: April 25, 2015 – January 1, 2016
- Location: Guatemala
- Caused by: La Linea corruption case
- Goals: Resignation of President Otto Perez Molina; Fresh general elections
- Methods: Demonstrations
- Result: Otto Perez Molina resigns and cabinet forced to step down

The 2015 Guatemala protests were a series of demonstrations against the government of Otto Pérez Molina in which he was involved in a scandal and political corruption that led to his resignation in the same year. These mass protests, nonviolent protests, bloodless disturbances, political crisis and peaceful uprising in war-scarred Guatemala led by hundreds of thousands.

== Protests ==
The protesters called for the resignation of the president as he is considered to be involved in corruption in the government. Despite the fact that the people asked him to, the president has said that he will not resign and will continue with his mandate until his turn ends; At the end of June 2015, the preliminary ruling against him was approved, which awaited the next ordinary meeting of the Congress of the Republic to continue the process.

The protesters suspected that Manuel Baldizón:would be involved in money laundering and drug trafficking since it is believed that he spends more money than he has, and since he is investing an exaggerated amount of money in advertising, mostly illegal. It is suspected that if he is elected president in the general elections of September 6, his management could reach enormous levels of corruption. Mass protest movements by millions of Guatemalan miners, doctors, workers, students and teachers continued throughout 2015–2016, even after the resignation of the government. Mass protests in August forced the uprising to oust the government and president Otto Perez Molina. City-wide and nationwide Occupations and Strikes continued throughout the year.

== See also ==
- 2020 Guatemalan protests
