= Juan Francisco Reyes =

Guatemalan politician (1938–2019)

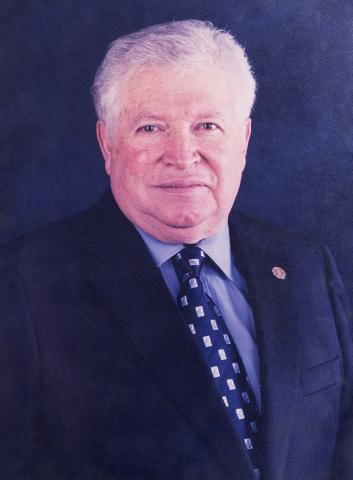
- Official portrait

Vice President of Guatemala
- In office 14 January 2000 – 14 January 2004
- President: Alfonso Portillo
- Preceded by: Luis Alberto Flores Asturias
- Succeeded by: Eduardo Stein

Personal details
- Born: 10 July 1938; Guatemala City, Guatemala
- Died: 10 January 2019 (aged 80); Guatemala City, Guatemala
- Political party: Guatemalan Republican Front

Juan Francisco Reyes López (10 July 1938 – 10 January 2019) was a Guatemalan politician who served as Vice President of Guatemala from 14 January 2000 to 14 January 2004 in the cabinet of President Alfonso Portillo.

In 1989, Reyes was one of the founders of the Guatemalan Republican Front. He was elected Deputy to the Congress of Guatemala for two terms between 1990 and 1998.

Preceded by Luis Alberto Flores	Vice President of Guatemala; 2000–2004	Succeeded by Eduardo Stein
