= Eduardo Stein =

Vice President of Guatemala

Eduardo Stein Barillas
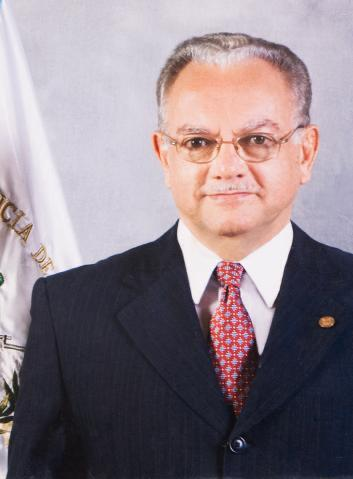
- Official portrait

Vice President of Guatemala
- In office 14 January 2004 – 14 January 2008
- President: Óscar Berger
- Preceded by: Juan Francisco Reyes
- Succeeded by: Rafael Espada

Minister of Foreign Affairs of Guatemala
- In office 14 January 1996 – 14 January 2000
- President: Álvaro Arzú
- Preceded by: Alejandro Maldonado
- Succeeded by: Gabriel Orellana

Personal details
- Born: 20 October 1946 (age 79) Guatemala City, Guatemala
- Party: Grand National Alliance
- Education: Northwestern University (MA, PhD)

Eduardo Stein Barillas (born 20 October 1946) is a Guatemalan diplomat who served as the Vice President of Guatemala from 14 January 2004 to 14 January 2008, serving a concurrent four-year mandate with President Óscar Berger. He is currently the Joint Special Representative of the UN High Commissioner for Refugees and the International Organization for Migration for Venezuelan refugees and migrants.

Prior to his election, he held several positions with the International Organization for Migration, the United Nations Development Programme, and the Organization of American States. He also served as Minister of Foreign Affairs under President Álvaro Arzú from 14 January 1996 to 14 January 2000.

Eduardo Stein is a Member of the Global Leadership Foundation, a not-for-profit organization that offers, discreetly and confidentially, a range of experienced advisors to political leaders facing difficult situations. Stein is a member of the Inter-American Dialogue.

On 19 September 2018, Stein was appointed Joint Special Representative of the UN High Commissioner for Refugees and the International Organization for Migration for Venezuelan refugees and migrants.

Political offices
Preceded by Juan Francisco Reyes	Vice President of Guatemala; 2004–2008	Succeeded by Rafael Espada
