= Jafeth Cabrera =

Guatemalan politician

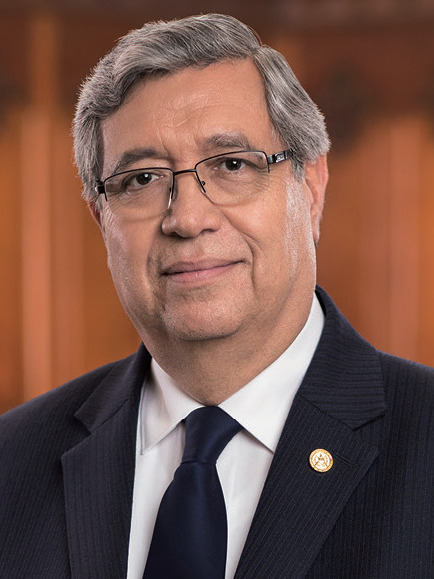
- Official portrait, 2016

16th Vice President of Guatemala
- In office 14 January 2016 – 14 January 2020
- President: Jimmy Morales
- Preceded by: Alfonso Fuentes
- Succeeded by: Guillermo Castillo

Rector of Universidad de San Carlos de Guatemala
- In office June 28, 1994 – June 28, 1998
- Preceded by: Alfonso Fuentes
- Succeeded by: Efraín Medina

Personal details
- Born: Ernesto Jafeth Cabrera Franco; 28 November 1948 (age 76); Guatemala City, Guatemala
- Political party: National Convergence Front
- Education: Universidad de San Carlos de Guatemala

Ernesto Jafeth Cabrera Franco (Guatemala City, 28 November 1948) is a Guatemalan politician who served as Vice President of Guatemala from 2016 to 2020 under the government of Jimmy Morales.

== Early life and career ==
Cabrera studied at the Universidad de San Carlos de Guatemala, where he obtained a degree in medicine and surgery. He was Rector of the University between 1994 and 1998.

== Political career ==
Cabrera's political career started in 1999 when he was one of the founders of the National Unity of Hope with Álvaro Colom. Cabrera left the party shortly afterward. In 2004, he became Secretary for Agricultural Affairs.

In May 2015, Caberera was announced as the National Convergence Front candidate for the office of Vice President for the 2015 elections. He was attached to Jimmy Morales as a presidential candidate.

In September 2015, Cabrera announced that he believed that one of the causes of Guatemala's problems was to be found in the Spanish colonization of the Americas, stating that if Guatemala had been taken over by another country the problems would not have been so grave.

On 6 November 2015, Cabrera was officially declared as Vice President-elect by the Supreme Electoral Tribunal of Guatemala.

== Personal life ==
His son, Jafeth Ernesto Cabrera Cortéz, was elected to the Congress of Guatemala for the National Convergence Front in the 2015 parliamentary elections. He could, however, not take up his seat due to a law prohibiting relatives of the President and Vice-President from becoming deputies.

Political offices
Preceded by Alfonso Fuentes Soria	Vice President of Guatemala; 2016–2020	Succeeded by Guillermo Castillo Reyes
