= Francisco Coma =

Spanish footballer (1898–1951)

Personal information
- Full name: Francisco Coma Vives
- Birth name: Francesc Coma i Vives
- Date of birth: 5 June 1898
- Place of birth: Barcelona, Spain
- Date of death: 26 December 1993 (aged 95)
- Place of death: Barcelona, Spain
- Position: Defender

Youth career
- CD Mercuri
- CE Europa

Senior career*
| Years | Team | Apps | (Gls) |
| 1915–1918 | Atlético de Sabadell | | |
| 1918–1927 | Barcelona | | |
| 1927–1928 | Sants | | |

International career
| 1924 | Catalonia | 1 | (0) |
- * Club domestic league appearances and goals

Francisco Coma Vives (5 June 1898 – 26 December 1951) was a Spanish footballer who played as a defender for Barcelona between 1918 and 1927, winning one Copa del Rey in 1920, and five Catalan Championships in the 1920s.

== Club career ==
Born in the Catalonian town of Barcelona on 5 June 1898, Coma began his career in the youth ranks of his hometown clubs CD Mercuri and CE Europa, from which he joined Atlético de Sabadell in 1915, aged 17. Three years later, in 1915, he signed for Barça, making his debut with the first team in a friendly match against Martinenc on 4 August, which ended in a 1–1 draw win, and his official competitive debut on 20 October, helping his side to a 2–0 victory over Sabadell in the Catalan championship. In late 1921, he was conscripted to fight the Rif War in Morocco, but he was able to return a few months later.

Coma stayed at Barça for nearly a decade, from 1918 until 1927, scoring a total of 4 goals in 265 matches, of which only 37 were competitive, helping his side win the Copa del Rey in 1920, and five Catalan Championships (1919–21, 1924, and 1927). He then played his last football at Sants, where he retired in 1928, aged 30. He remained linked to Barça, becoming responsible for the maintenance at the Les Corts.

== International career ==
As a Barça player, Coma was eligible to play for the Catalan national team, playing his only match for them on 24 February 1924, in a tribute match to Gabriel Bau against Avenç, helping his side to a 5–4 victory.

== Death ==
Coma died in Barcelona on 26 December 1951, at the age of 95.

== Honours ==
FC Barcelona

- Copa del Rey
  - Champions (1): 1920
- Catalan championship
  - Champions (5): 1918–19, 1919–20, 1920–21, 1923–24, 1926–27
