= Juan Alfonso Fuentes Soria =

Guatemalan politician

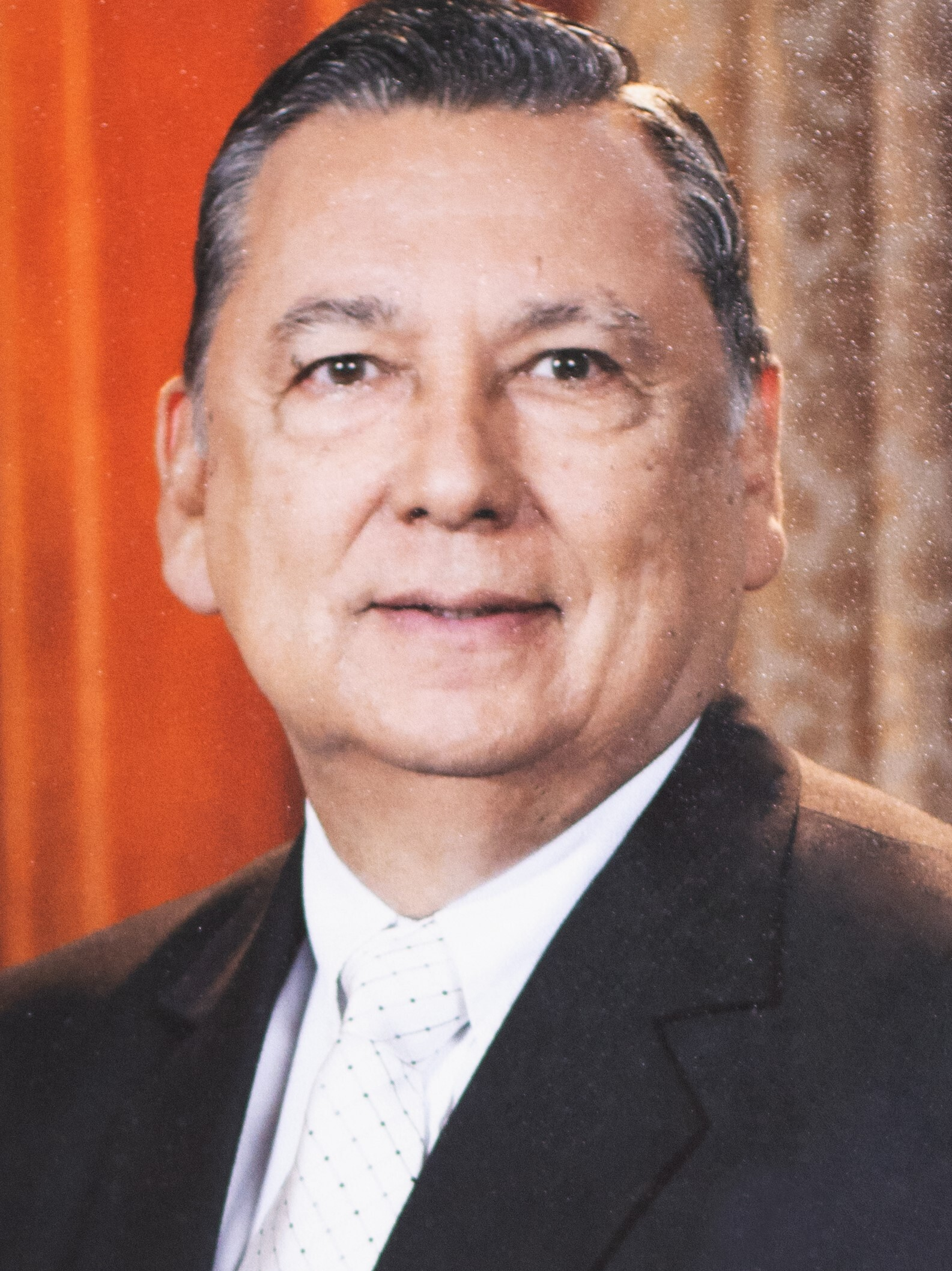
- Official portrait, 2015

15th Vice President of Guatemala
- In office September 16, 2015 – January 14, 2016
- President: Alejandro Maldonado
- Preceded by: Alejandro Maldonado
- Succeeded by: Jafeth Cabrera

Rector of Universidad de San Carlos de Guatemala
- In office June 28, 1990 – June 28, 1994
- Preceded by: Roderico Segura Trujillo
- Succeeded by: Jafeth Cabrera

Deputy of the Central American Parliament
- In office March 16, 2016 – January 14, 2020 Serving with Alejandro Maldonado
- Preceded by: Rafael Espada
- Succeeded by: Jafeth Cabrera
- Constituency: Former Vice President of Guatemala

Personal details
- Born: Juan Alfonso Fuentes Soria; 16 May 1947 (age 79) Guatemala City
- Spouse: Sandra Rosales
- Children: 2
- Education: Universidad de San Carlos de Guatemala

Juan Alfonso Fuentes Soria (Spanish pronunciation: [xwan alˈfonso ˈfwentes ˈsoɾja]; born 16 May 1947) is a politician who was Vice President of Guatemala following the appointment of Alejandro Maldonado as president by the Congress of Guatemala. He is also a dentist who was rector of the Universidad de San Carlos de Guatemala.

Political offices
Preceded by Alejandro Maldonado	Vice President of Guatemala; 2015–2016	Succeeded by Jafeth Cabrera
