= Adela de Torrebiarte =

Guatemalan politician (1949–2020)

Adela Camacho de Torrebiarte
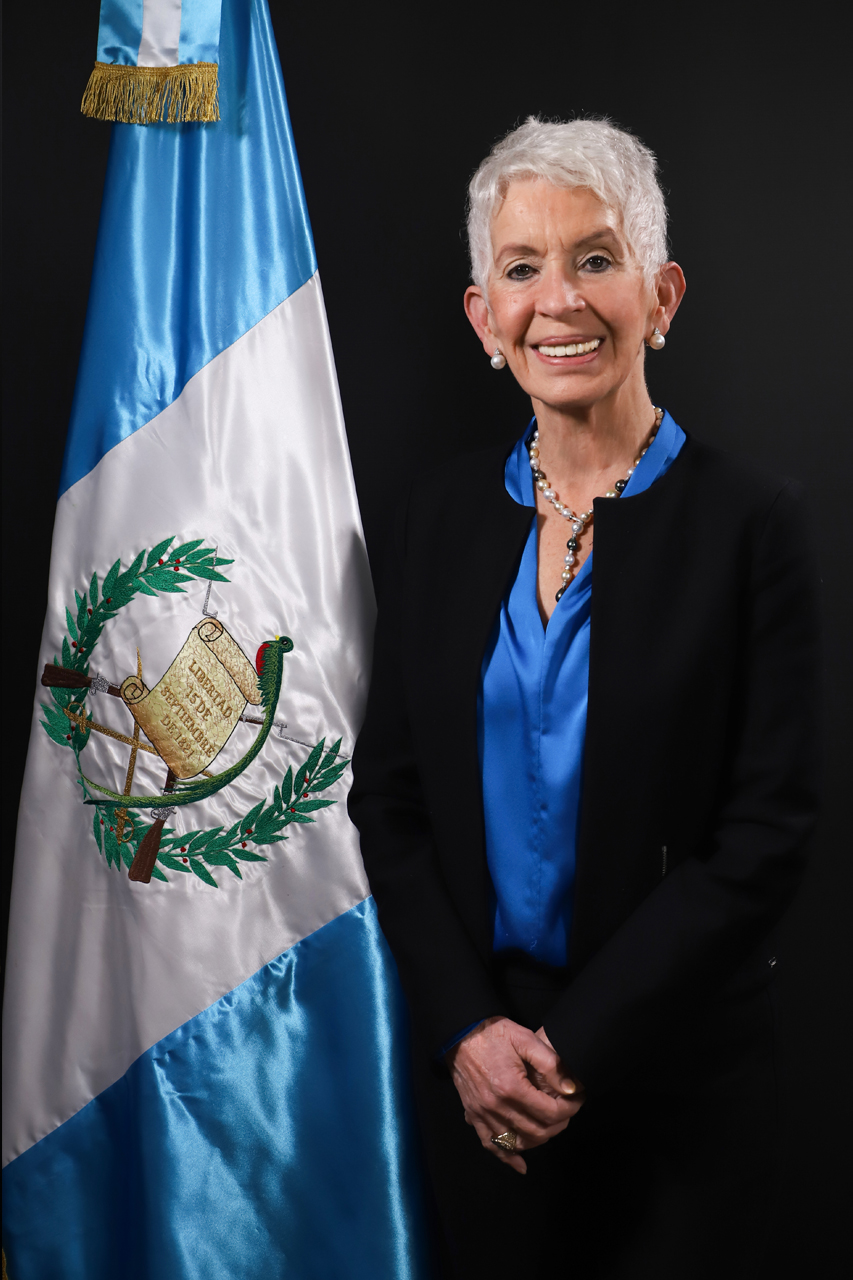
- Official portrait, 2020

President of the National Football Federation of Guatemala
- In office 5 January 2016 – 14 September 2017
- Preceded by: Milton Mendez
- Succeeded by: Eduardo Prado

Personal details
- Born: Adela Ana María del Rosario Camacho Sinibaldi; 30 March 1949 Guatemala City, Guatemala
- Died: 16 December 2020 (aged 71) Guatemala City, Guatemala
- Party: CREO
- Other political affiliations: Acción de Desarrollo Nacional 2011-2012; Grand National Alliance 2004-2010
- Spouse: Luis Pedro Torrebiarte Lantzerdörffer
- Children: Luis Pedro Torrebiarte Camacho; María Inés Torrebiarte Camacho
- Education: Universidad de San Carlos de Guatemala

Adela Ana María del Rosario Camacho Sinibaldi de Torrebiarte (30 March 1949 – 16 December 2020) was a Guatemalan politician.

== Career ==
She served as the president of the National Football Federation of Guatemala (FENAFUTG) from 2016 to 2017. She was also a candidate in the 2011 presidential election.

She had two children, Luis Pedro and Maria Inés. She is survived by her grandchildren, Santiago, Andres, Alejandro, Isabel, Gabriel, Lucia, and Marcelo. Her funeral took place on 16 December 2020.

She was a founding member of the Suffering Mothers which is a support group for her country's kidnap victims. When she was Interior Minister in 2007 she reacted to the killing of three politicians from Salvador and the execution of four police who were the prime suspects. She announced that over 550 policemen who were known for misconduct were to be sacked.

Adela de Torrebiarte died of lung cancer on 16 December 2020.
