= La Línea corruption case =

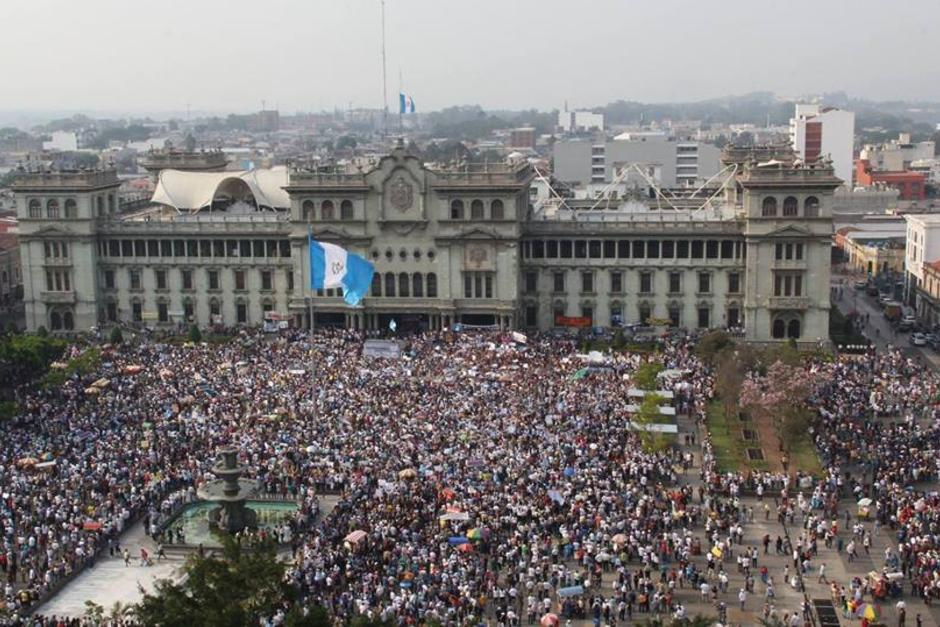
"Pacific demonstration" in Guatemala City, on April 25, 2015, after the first corruption allegations against the Pérez Molina Administration.

The La Línea corruption case began in Guatemala on April 16, 2015 when the International Commission against Impunity in Guatemala (Spanish: Comisión Internacional Contra la Impunidad en Guatemala, CICIG) and State prosecutors accused a number of politicians in the administration of President Otto Pérez Molina of setting up a customs corruption ring with the help of high-ranking officials in the tax and customs administration. Several demonstrations ensued, calling for the resignation of Pérez Molina and his vice-president Roxana Baldetti. Among the accused were the retired captain Juan Carlos Monzón, (at the time Baldetti's private secretary) and the directors of the Tax Administration Superintendency or Superintendencia de Administración Tributaria, (SAT), an entity analogous to the US Internal Revenue Service. Baldetti resigned in early May to the joy of thousands of demonstrators.

On 20 May 2015, the CICIG and Guatemalan Chief Prosecutor Thelma Aldana exposed another high-level corruption scandal, when they announced the Guatemalan Social Security Institute (Instituto Guatemalteco de Seguridad Social) -IGSS investigation, which found that the board of directors plotted to award a renal facility service contract to an external company that did not comply with the minimal requirements and caused the death of numerous patients. Investigations from both entities showed that the contract had been granted by heavy bribes to some of the board members, specially IGSS President Juan de Dios Rodríguez, Pérez Molina's former private secretary. The board members were sent to prison. A few weeks later, another corruption scandal broke when another of former Perez Molina's private secretaries went to jail, accused of being involved in a high stakes case with energy company Jaguar Energy.

On 21 August 2015, prosecutors and the CICIG asked for the arrest of Baldetti and the impeachment of Pérez Molina for their involvement in "La Línea case". In a press conference, CICIG chief, Colombian prosecutor Iván Velazquez reported that during the procedures carried out on 16 April 2015, they discovered that the president and the vice president were the masterminds of La Línea, not Juan Carlos Monzón. Furthermore, CICIG implied, the two might have been involved with the customs ring even before they were inaugurated on 14 January 2012. Baldetti was sent to the Women's Preventative Detention Center, after she had spent a few days in the VIP jail in the Army's Matamoros Fort.

Events came to a climax during Baldetti's legal hearing. An intercepted phone conversation was played in which one could hear the voice of President Perez Molina asking the SAT director for personnel changes, allegedly to accommodate the smuggling network. A national strike was called after the release of that conversation. In the end, on September 1, Otto Pérez Molina was impeached and stripped of his immunity; he resigned September 2 and was in custody on the 3rd.

== Sindicato and Cofradía ==
In the 1970s, generals Manuel Antonio Callejas and Francisco Ortega Menaldo ― the son-in-law of then-president Carlos Manuel Arana Osorio ― created a powerful organization parallel to the Ministerio de Finanzas Públicas (Ministry of Public Finances). The Guatemalan Army allegedly authorized the group to detect weapon smuggling for the guerrillas during the Guatemalan Civil War. In reality, this organization was heavily involved in smuggling and other illicit activities. From it two powerful groups emerged: the "Sindicato" (syndicate, union) and the "Cofradía" (brotherhood).

=== Moreno smuggling ring ===
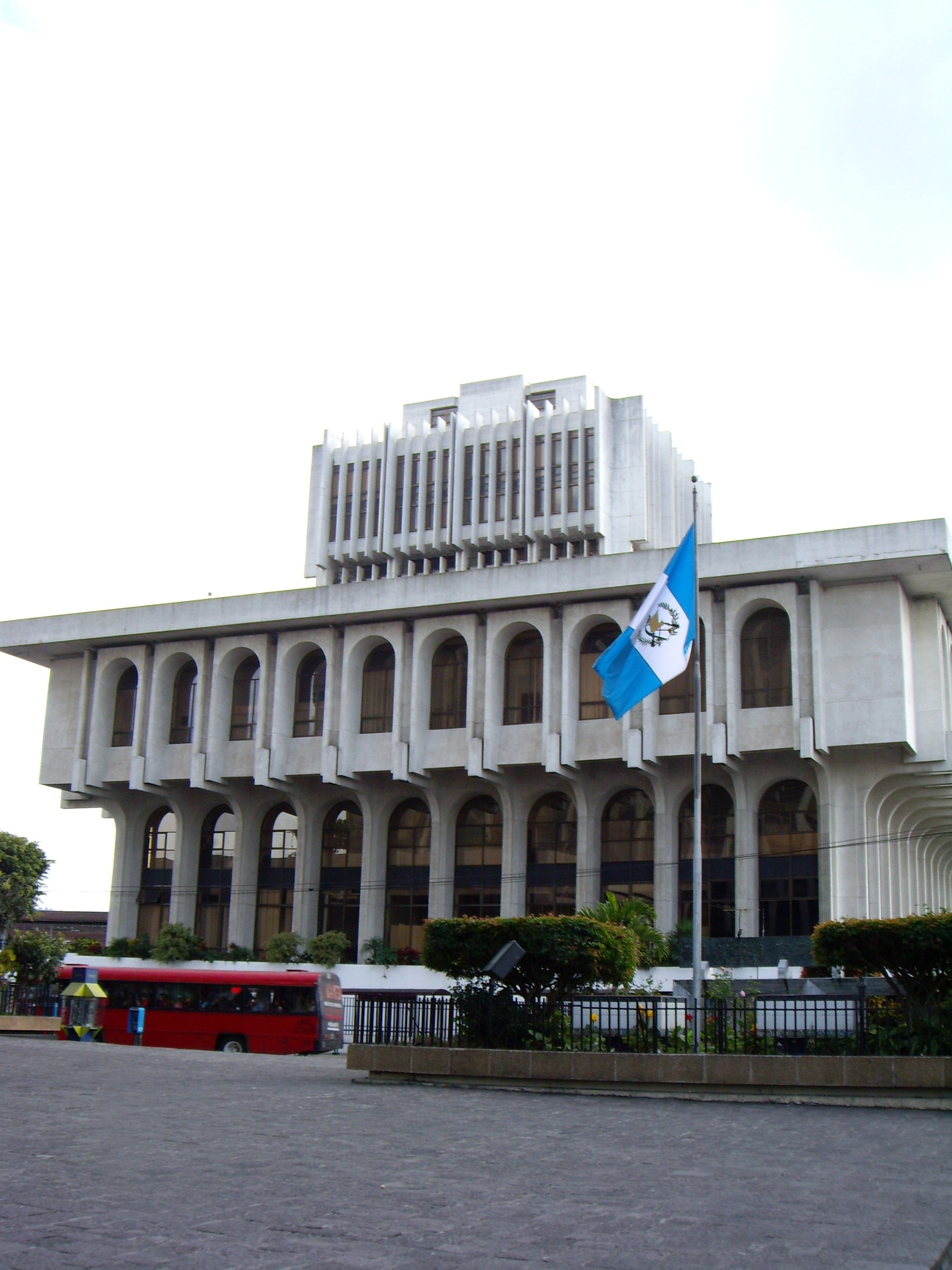
Guatemala Supreme Court building

During Álvaro Arzú's presidency (1996–2000) the smuggling ring was attacked when the National Prosecutor found evidence that implicated several high-ranking Army officers, among them general Luis Francisco Ortega Menaldo, colonel Salán Sánchez, general Efraín Ríos Montt, coronel Napoleón Rojas Méndez, major Byron Barrientos, and Mario Guillermo Ruiz Wong. Then-presidential candidate Alfonso Portillo was mentioned. According to the legal proceedings that took place between 2000 and 2002, the ring controlled container transfers, import prices, and the type of merchandise that was to be moved; the ring would take control of the containers and would not release them until a hefty bribe was paid. None of these names immediately came to public light, and a middleman operator named Alfredo Moreno Molinda was accused of being the ringleader. Moreno was previously captured on September 14, 1996. After Portillo's victory in the 2000 elections, the new Attorney General, Rodolfo González Rodas, dismantled the unit in charge of Moreno's case, allegedly due to the ring's connections to Portillo and Ríos Montt - leaders of Portillo's political party. Finally, in 2001, Alfredo Moreno paid a million quetzals jail bond and was released after serving five years in prison in the Zone 18 Preventive. On February 7, 2013, Moreno, who had health problems at the time of his 1996 arrest, died as a result of cardiac arrest.

=== Pérez Molina's presidency ===
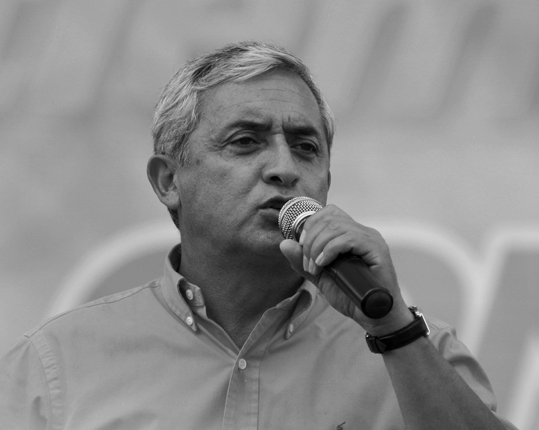
Retired general Otto Pérez Molina, president of Guatemala from 14 January 2012 to 3 September 2015.

Otto Pérez Molina was elected president in the 2011 general elections and shortly after his inauguration privatized the Empresa Portuaria Quetzal (English:Quetzal Harbor Enterprise) in Escuintla, on Holy Wednesday of the first Holy Week under his tenure; the Holy Week is a highly respected holiday in Guatemala and his move prompted several complaints about its legality. Later, Baldetti appointed Claudia Méndez Asencio - a close friend of hers - as SAT Customs Chief. Only two months later, Pérez Molina intervened in the Superintendencia de Administración Tributaria and placed military personnel in key points in customs, allegedly to increase tax collection and prevent smuggling.

When President Pérez Molina took office in 2012, Vice President Baldetti Elías brought a retired general, Luis Francisco Ortega Menaldo, to work with her in the vice president's office, acknowledging their close relationship. Ortega Menaldo has been considered the protégé of former president Carlos Manuel Arana Osorio, since he had married Arana's daughter, and Arana had helped Ortega get to the upper ranks of military intelligence in the 1970s. Ortega Menaldo, then a captain, was trained in the Telecommunication Regional Center, a.k.a. "La Regional", during Arana's government (1970–1974). In 1980, he was appointed as chief of the newly created Department of Security and Special Investigations in the Public Finances Secretariat, which allegedly was the origin of the smuggling ring. When Vinicio Cerezo was elected president in 1985, then-Secretary of Defense Héctor Gramajo appointed him as chief of Military Intelligence in 1987 while general Manuel Callejas ― the "Cofradía"'s boss ― was appointed as Defense Chief of Staff. Gramajo used the criminal enterprise for support against the Army's hard-line officers many of whom worked closely with the extreme right-wing party Movimiento de Liberación Nacional – MLN – and thus stop coup d'état attempts against president Cerezo. With CIA help, Ortega Menaldo founded the Military Intelligence School in 1987, and worked closely with the DEA.

Thus, the two executive leaders ― Pérez Molina and Baldetti Elías ― bought an alliance to the main military groups that formed during the Guatemala Civil War: "Sindicato" and "Cofradía". But the presence of Luis Mendizábal ― owner of Emilio's boutique, the alleged ring headquarters ― confirmed that yet a third group also had a strong position in the government: that of retired general Marco Tulio Espinosa Contreras, an Air Force general, who raised his profile during the Álvaro Arzú presidency.

Pérez Molina's government had faced with a constant fiscal deficit since 2012 and missed SAT's collection goals every single quarter; customs taxes dropped in 2013 from 15,800 million to 15,300 million quetzals and was even lower in 2014; the same happened with sales taxes over imports. The fiscal gap in those years was as high as 7,000 million of quetzals, which was covered by treasure bonds and international loans, increasing public debt. The financial crisis forced the Government to create new phone, cement, and mining taxes to balance its budget for 2015.

In September 2014, retired captain Byron Lima Oliva, who was already in prison with a 15-year sentence after being formally accused of being the material assassin of bishop Juan José Gerardi, was accused by CICIG of being the one that controlled the Pavoncito prison where he was committed and practically had control of the whole Guatemalan jail system. Investigations showed that Lima Oliva came and went as he pleased in armored SUVs with a police escort; when he was apprehended outside the prison and taken to the Supreme Court building to testify along with other accused, he reportedly said several times that he was a personal friend of Pérez Molina. It was not the first time he was captured outside his prison cell: in February 2013 he was captured in a SUV outside prison. CICIG accused Lima Oliva of creating a multimillion-dollar empire by controlling the prisons and charging up to US$12,000 for selling prison transfers.

In early April 2015, in discussions with the United Nations about extending CICIG's mandate for another two years, both Pérez Molina and Baldetti were adamant that the International Commission was no longer needed in Guatemala.

== Investigation ==
On April 16, the International Commission against Impunity in Guatemala (CICIG) accused a number of politicians within the administration of President Pérez Molina of setting up a criminal network within the Tax and Customs Administration. At the time, the CICIG believed that the La Línea network was headed by Monzón Rojas (Baldetti's secretary) and Omar Franco (Chief Officer of SAT, the Superintendencia de Administración Tributaria de Guatemala).

From May 2014 to February 2015, this corruption ring handled at least 500 containers, which benefited from lower customs duties in exchange for very significant bribes, thanks to the ring's control of the customs offices at Puerto Quetzal and Santo Tomás, as well as at the central customs administration.

The name of the corruption ring, La Línea – "the (telephone) line" – came from the phone number, which any import company could call to ask for reduced customs duties. The network involved dozens of people within the tax and customs administration as well as in the Pérez Molina administration itself.

=== Suspects ===
On the early morning of 16 April 2015, an operation with a total of 23 operatives with 250 Civil National Police officers, besides CICIG and public prosecutor officials, resulted in extensive information collection and 20 suspects captured, among them SAT personnel, customs agents and entrepreneurs.

The captured suspects were:

- SAT personnel:
  - Álvaro Omar Franco Chacón, SAT Chief Director;
  - Sebastián Herrera Carrera, Human Resources manager;
  - Anthony Segura Franco, SAT union general secretary;
  - Karla Mireya Herrera España, Central Customs building manager;
  - Gustavo Morales Pinzón, South division manager;
  - José Rolando Gil Monterroso;
  - Melvin Gudiel Alvarado, administrator; and
  - Carlos Enrique Muñoz Roldán, former SAT Chief Director
- External ring:
  - Adolfo Sebastián Batz;
  - Carlos Ixtuc Cuc;
  - Geovanni Marroquín Navas;
  - Julio César Aldana Sosa;
  - Mónica Patricia Jáuregui;
  - Salvador Estuardo González;
  - Osama Ezzat Aziz Aranki;
  - Byron Antonio Izquierdo;
  - Francisco Javier Ortiz Arriaga;
  - Julio Estuardo González de León;
  - Herbert Francisco Cabrera;
  - Miguel Ángel Lemus Aldana.

According to Iván Velásquez, CICIG's Chief Commissioner, the crime network had been under investigation since May 2014, when the CICIG got tips that there were connections between importers and customs officers, who found ways for the importers to pay fewer taxes. Telephone call information for "La Línea" was given to importers. "La Línea" operated mainly in the major harbors and in the central customs building. Velásquez did not specify the total amount embezzled but said that the ring charged between 20,000 and 100,000 quetzals per container. Finally, informed that the intercepted phone conversation showed that from the 40% of tax paid, 30% came from bribes, to decrease the amount of taxes that the importer had to pay. "La Línea" possibly embezzled more than 2 million quetzals per week in bribes. More than a thousand companies may have used "La Línea" to avoid paying some taxes, and these companies are under investigation as well.

=== Alleged ring leaders: Otto Pérez Molina and Roxana Baldetti ===
Initially, Juan Carlos Monzón Rojas was accused of being the ringleader. Monzón Rojas was linked with the Panamanian company Edengrove International, created in April 2011, according to the Panama Public Registry. In May 2011 the company was registered in Guatemala. Víctor Hugo Hernández was president of the board and also a founding associate of Inversiones y Proyectos Marbella, S.A. and Arrendamientos, Servicios y Proyectos, S.A., both Guatemalan companies that in May 2013 bought 58% of the Corporación de Noticias, S. A. stock, a company that owns the influential Guatemalan newspapers Siglo 21 and Al Día, for 25 million quetzals. Estuardo González, Corporación de Noticias president, was also one of the accused in La Linea. Later on, González would tell the complete story during trial: both companies were a front that he helped build for Baldetti, to gain control of those influential newspapers. In December 2014, the Guatemalan newspaper El Periódico reported that Monzón had bought a lavish home in an exclusive neighborhood in Guatemala City for US$850,000.

On 22 April 2015, it was disclosed that Monzón Rojas' company, Canchas Deportivas S. A., had gotten up to 13 Government contracts worth several million quetzals even though the company had not been in operation since 2007, and the company was getting contracts from official sports federations in the country, although Monzón had stepped down from his company when he was appointed secretary to the vice president. When former SAT director Carlos Muñoz was indicted, Guatemalan prosecutors put an intercepted phone conversation between him and Juan Carlos Monzón into evidence. The two discussed possible personnel changes at SAT.

On 21 August 2015, CICIG and the Guatemalan attorney general held a joint press conference where they issued a warrant for Baldetti's arrest and asked for president Pérez Molina's impeachment; they informed the press that they had gathered evidence during the 16 April operations that linked both to La Linea, and that the two were most likely the true leaders of the ring. On 17 April 2015 they had presented an intercepted phone conversation in which some of the other suspects talked about "el Presidente", without saying his name, but said that "el Presidente' had asked them to open four bank accounts since CICIG already had too much information. Besides "el Presidente", the nickmanes "la R", "la R2" and "la Señora" were heard in these conversations, all referring to a person who had ordered personnel changes in SAT. Despite strong suspicion that these people were Pérez Molina and Baldetti, the CICIG did not ask for their arrest at that time because they did not have any incontrovertible proof against them.

On 21 September 2015, El Periódico reported that the 16 April operatives in Salvador Estuardo González Álvarez —a.k.a. "Eco"—, found thousand of documents revealing that besides "La Línea" a network of companies linked to Roxana Baldetti moved millions of quetzals. Due to this, González could cooperate with the prosecutors to testify against Pérez Molina and Baldetti. The same day, the Supreme Court withdrew immunity from judge Marta Sierra de Stalling, due to her suspicious connection to the "Impunity Law Firm". She was captured the next day.

"I was told that the project was to improve customs tax collections and that it was directly managed by the President. Let me tell you, honorable judge, that I was very proud of supporting help with tax collection improvements and a person like the President. The project was in Quetzal and Santo Tomás Ports and that is where I was told that the increase had to happen through some money that was asked through the customs officers. It was a bribe. I had to keep track, so I made a table and placed a 1 or a 2 instead of president and vice president.»

— Salvador Estuardo González, Eco
28 September 2015

As El Periódico predicted on 28 September 2015, during the second part of the trial against the La Linea members, Salvador Estuardo González —a.k.a. "Eco"— voluntarily offered to testify, an offer which was initially opposed by the defense attorneys, who argued that there were three accused missing. The judge rejected their objection. González—who said that he was willing to have a face-to-face with any other accused—methodically exposed a series of data that seriously incriminated several of the accused:

1. Baldetti was the first other member of the group that González met, and he helped her set up and manage seven companies that had not been operative for two years.
2. González created the codes "el 1" and "la 2" for the president and vice president, respectively.
3. González kept track of the money that was embezzled.
4. 50% of the embezzlement was split between Pérez Molina and Baldetti Elías.
5. Claudia Méndez Asencio was indeed aware of what was going on and even joined González in several meetings about it. Once she was appointed as Customs manager she was notified of La Línea was and informed that she was getting 5% of the profits.
6. The United States Embassy was aware of the "collection tax project" and the work done by Javier Ortiz —a.k.a. "Teniente Jerez"—.
- Gonzalez got 2% of the profits.
- When "La Linea" was restructuring, González Álvarez stopped working for it and went back to work for Baldetti's seven companies, but he also started working with four companies of former President Otto Pérez Molina, whom he met every Monday in an office located on 16 street in zone 10 in Guatemala City, where they were joined by the President's daughter, wife and daughter-in-law.

On 29 September 2015 González continued testifying, and was cross-questioned by both prosecutors and defense attorneys, standing firm by his version of events and revealing more details:

- 61% of the bribes were made in cash, while the remaining 39% was in charge of the external network.
- González emphasized that he did not charge a penny for his services as "manager"; however, he did confess that he got 2% of the embezzled funds initially and 5% later on.
- González allegedly met former President Pérez Molina's daughter, whom he called "Lissett", daughter-in-law, "Luisa" and wife, Rosa Leal de Pérez; these women allegedly got government contracts for their company Grupo Pixel S.A..
- González was the link between SAT and Pérez Molina to keep control of "La Linea", per Juan Carlos Monzón's request.
- González kept personal and email contact with Baldetti, who was coded in his cell phones as "2" or "MyLine".
- Customs personnel were chosen by Javier Ortiz -a.k.a. "Teniente Jerez"-, and then González coordinated with SAT Human Resources manager to settle the appointments. All the appointed personnel had years of experience with customs and tax law.
- Claudia Méndez Asencio allegedly coordinated González' access to the SAT building eighth floor through a private elevator.
- While "La Linea" was operative, Pérez Molina, Baldetti Elías, Osama Aziz Aranki, Javier Ortiz —a.k.a. "Teniente Jerez"— and Juan Carlos Monzón all used cutting-edge technology in untraceable phones.
- González used the same kind of phones to work at Siglo 21, a newspaper that he controlled at the time.

González explained in detail how Roxana Baldetti's front companies worked, a version that remained unaltered across the lengthy questioning of lawyers and procesutors: González was hired to manage seven companies. Other companies controlled by Víctor Hugo Hernández, Juan Carlos Monzón's trusted employee. González explained that his job was to make sure that all these front companies had offices that reflected the capital that they allegedly had and the services that they were supposed to offer; he also looked for mock stockholders and board members that fit the profile for the supposed type of companies.

PROINVER was officially registered under Baldetti's name. González said that he did not control it, but that he cooperated with making projections for PROINVER's dividends, projections the corporation met, quarter after quarter. Baldetti was allegedly always on top of everything, setting up meetings with González and Hernández at the headquarters of her front companies. Guatemalan newspaper Prensa Libre researched several of these companies and found the following:

"The companies revealed by "Eco" [González] are: Publihaces, Publimerc, Corporación Urma, La Montaña Ecológica, Representaciones Alliancee, SA., Grupo Agro Industrial 2011, S.A. and Serpumer, S.A. Of them, Prensa Libre found for in the government records.
González Álvarez said that he made forecasts and projections of what the companies should falsely report as profits every quarter, thus making Baldetti's economic profile believable.

The first capital injection occurred on 23 August 2013, when Herbert Arturo Jacobo Dubón, Grupo Agro Industrial 2011, S.A. president of the board, added capital for Q50 million. The company had been opened on 2 June 2011 with an initial capital of just Q5,000.

The second capital injection occurred on 10 April 2015, and it was for Representaciones Alliancee, S.A., whose Q5,000 initial capital increased to Q18 million. The company was opened on 20 December 2006. Since then, this company has purchased real estate linked to Baldetti and her family, among them a warehouse next to La Aurora International Airport.

[...] The four companies that Prensa Libre found share attorneys, board members and addresses and are all located at Avenida La Reforma 1–50, El Reformador building, fifth floor, zone 9 de la Ciudad de Guatemala.

— Prensa Libre
30 September 2015 »

== Aftermath ==
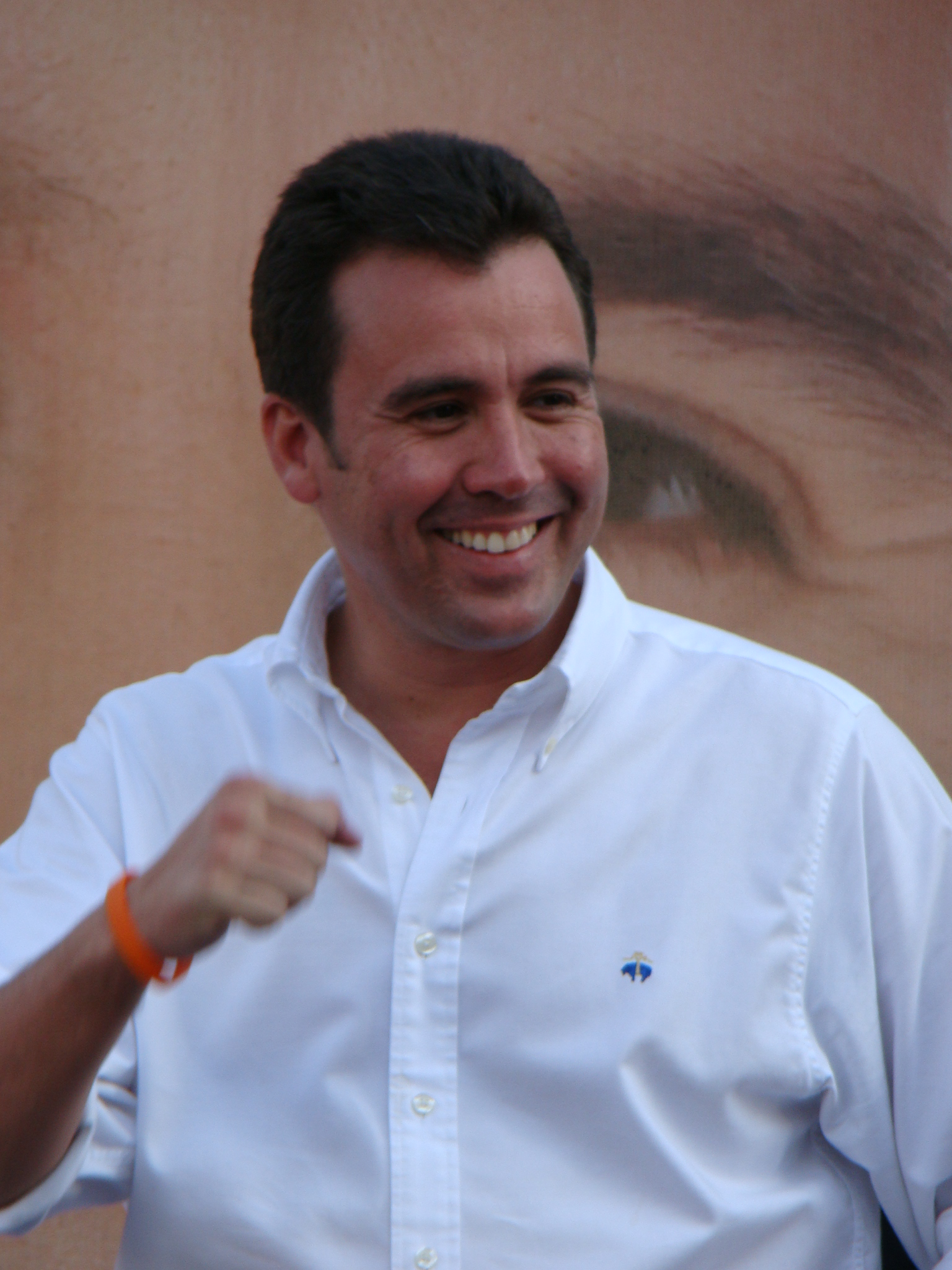

"I quit because I am not willing to lead a project whose only objective is to bring members of Congress with the mission of protecting obscure interests and to look for impunity spaces for corrupt government officials close to vicepresident Roxana Baldetti".
"I do have talked with [former president] Alfonso Portillo, as we share the vision for the Nation, with some difference on how to implement it".

— Alejandro Sinibaldi former official presidential candidate.
19 April 2015

After "La Linea" was discovered on 16 April 2015, both Perez Molina's political party and Government began to break down. On Sunday 19 April 2015, Partido Patriota founder and presidential candidate Alejandro Sinibaldi quit the party along with tenths of majors and about 20 congress members, and it was speculated that he could run for a different party. His reasons for quitting, according to Sinibaldi, were:

- The two contracts granted to Israeli company M Tarcic Engineering Ltd. for 137.8 million quetzals to "clean" Lake Amatitlán.
- "La Linea" case
- The hospital crisis that the country is submerged in
- The ill-advised interventions of the country's customs.

That afternoon Baldetti, freshly returned from South Korea, said in a press conference said that she was sorry to hear what had happened with Sinibaldi and that he and she had always had some differences, but that she did not know how upset he was with her.

At the same press conference, Baldetti emphasized that she was not part of the millionaire fraudulent ring; she showed videos from earlier in the year in which she was shown saying that the offices under her in the Government were already investigating structures like La Linea, at a time when Juan Carlos Monzón was her closest advisor. According to Baldetti, this was the first time that they had traveled abroad together and she told her now-former private secretary about the investigation against him and asked him to resign. Upset and bombarded with journalists' questions about her whereabouts which had been unknown for 48 hours, she turned around and left her own press conference.

In July 2015, after the Jaguar Energy scandal arrests, the alleged involvement of several members of Congress in bribes and money laundering, and presenting a detailed report on how the Guatemalan political parties' financing works—mostly related to illicit activitivies—CICIG demanded the Guatemalan Supreme Court take action. However, on 28 July 2015, the Supreme Court issued a statement in denounced the International Commission demands. In response, Guatemalan newspaper Diario La Hora reveals that the thirteen judges of the Supreme Court were designated thanks to the alliance between the official Partido Patriota and the main opposition party, Libertad Democrática Renovada. LIDER, a party that was almost positive that it was going to win the 2015 presidential elections.

Guatemalan Supreme Court election votes in Congress
Name	Position	LIDER votes	Patriota votes
Josué Felipe Baquiax Baquiax	Supreme Court president	41	36
Silvia Patricia Valdés Quezada	Judge I	49	47
Nery Osvaldo Medina Méndez	Judge II	47	36
Vitalina orellana y Orellana	Judge III	38	41
Delia Marina Dávila Salazar	Judge IV	41	37
Douglas René Charchal Ramos	Judge V	39	38
Sergio Amadeo Pineda Castañeda	Judge VII	39	37
Blanca Aída Stalling Dávila	Judge VIII	39	39
Silvia Verónica García Molina	Judge IX	38	39
Vladimir Osman Aguilar Guerra	Judge X	38	40
Nester Mauricio Vásquez Pimentel	Judge XI	41	31
Ranulfo Rafael Rojas Cetina	Judge XII	35	38
José Antonio Pineda Barales	Judge XIII	35	36

=== Arrest and conviction of Roxana Baldetti and Pérez Molina ===
On 21 August 2015, former Guatemalan Vice President Roxana Baldetti was arrested on fraud charges while she was visiting the hospital. On 3 September 2015, former Guatemalan President Otto Pérez Molina was arrested just hours after he resigned. By October 2017, 30 other people were detained with Baldetti and Pérez Molina. Pérez Molina, Baldetti and 26 other people were ordered to stand trial. In addition to the customs fraud charges, Baldetti also faces drug trafficking charges in the United States. One of five corruption and money laundering charges against Perez was later dropped in May 2021, though he still remained imprisoned at a Guatemala military base.

On October 9, 2018, Baldetti was sentenced to 15 1/2 years in prison after being convicted for fraud and other charges related to the issuance of government contracts to clean Lake Amatitlán. On 18 January 2022, Pérez Molina's "La Linea" related criminal trial officially began, with Baldetti serving as his co-defendant. On 7 December 2022, the two were sentenced to 16-year prison terms and fines of around US$1m each.

== See also ==
- 2015 Guatemalan protests
