= Vice President of Guatemala =

Political Position in Guatemala

Vice President of the Republic of Guatemala
- Vicepresidente de la República de Guatemala
- Vice presidential flag

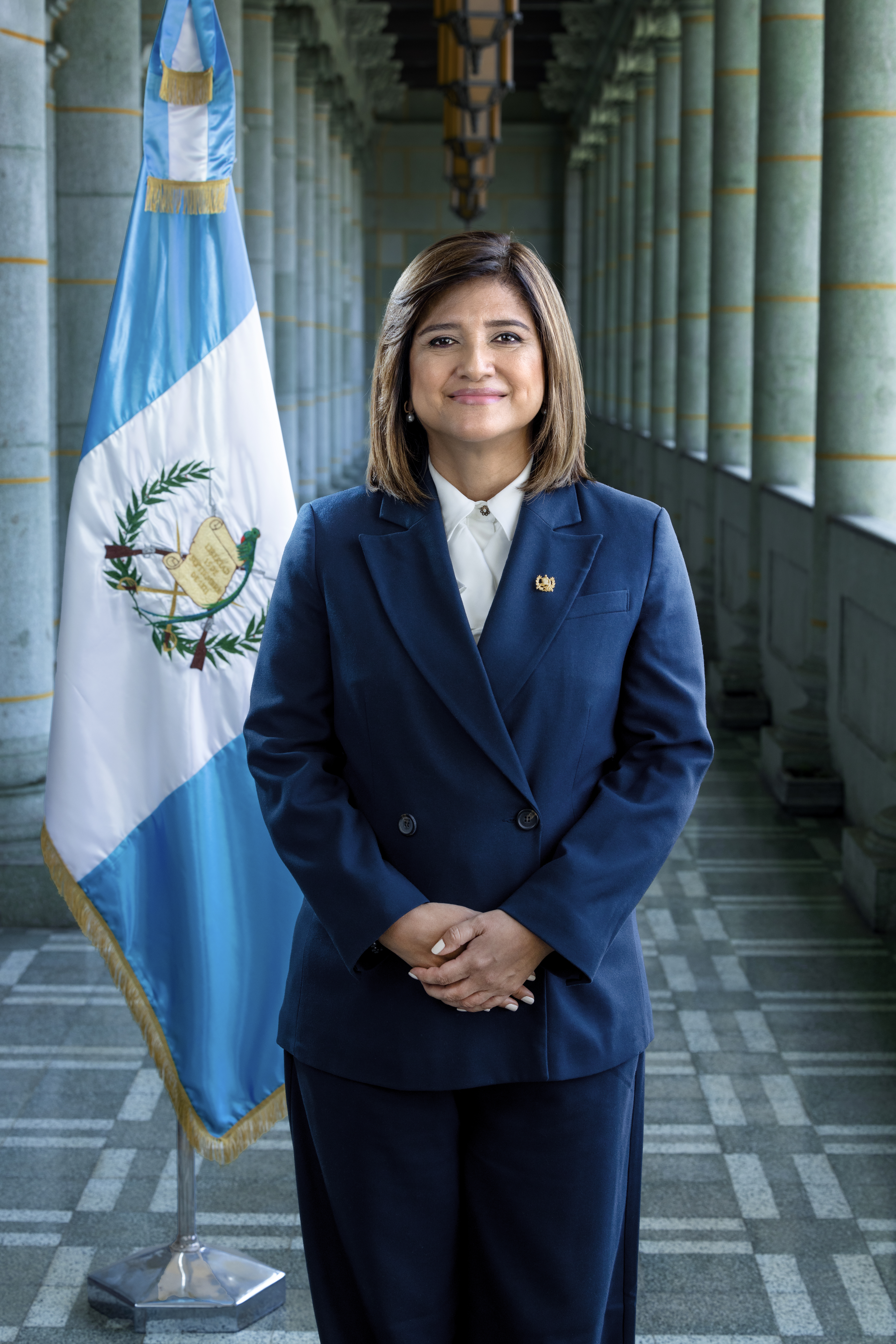
- Incumbent; Karin Herrera since 15 January 2024
- Style: Madam Vice President (informal); Most Excellent Madam Vice President of the Republic (official); Her Excellency (alternative formal, diplomatic outside of Guatemala)
- Member of: National Security Council
- Residence: Guatemalan National Palace
- Term length: Four years, non-extendable
- Inaugural holder: Clemente Marroquín Rojas
- Formation: 1 July 1966 (60 years ago)
- Website: vicepresidencia.gob.gt

Vice president of Guatemala (Spanish: Vicepresidente de Guatemala) is a political position in Guatemala which is since 1966 elected concurrently with the position of President of Guatemala. The current vice president is Karin Herrera.

The vice president needs to be a Guatemalan citizen of over 40 years of age.

Historically, there have been provisions for multiple Vice Presidents, officially Designates to the Presidency (Spanish: Designados a la Presidencia), also known as Presidential Designates (Spanish: Designados Presidenciales) elected for one- or two-year-terms. The election was carried in Congress of Guatemala. A provision for First and Second Vice Presidents existed 1882–1886, 1888-1921, 1921–1928 and 1956–1966. A provision for First, Second and Third Vice Presidents existed 1921 and 1928–1944.

History of the office holders follows.

== 1882–1886 ==
First Vice President	Second Vice President	Took office	Left office
Julian Salguero	Gen. Manuel Barillas	25 April 1882	27 April 1883
Gen. José María Orantes	Gen. Salvador Arévalo	27 April 1883	30 April 1884
Alejandro Sinibaldi	Gen. Manuel Barillas	30 April 1884	20 May 1885
Gen. Manuel Barillas	Gen. Manuel Soto	20 May 1885	15 March 1886

== 1886–1887 ==
Vice President	Took office	Left office	
Col. Vicente Castañeda	15 March 1886	26 June 1887	Position abolished

== 1888–1921 ==
First Vice President	Second Vice President	Took office	Left office
Gen. Calixto Mendizabal	Col. Manuel A. López	1 May 1888	21 May 1889
Gen. Vicente Orantes	Col. Manuel A. López	21 May 1889	10 May 1890
Rafael Salazar	Francisco Fuentes	10 May 1890	28 May 1891
Feliciano Aguilar	Francisco Villela	28 May 1891	14 May 1892
Manuel Morales Tovar	Arturo Ubico	14 May 1892	29 April 1893
Manuel Morales Tovar	Francisco Fuentes	29 April 1893	11 May 1894
Manuel Morales Tovar	Arturo Ubico	11 May 1894	6 May 1895
Manuel Morales Tovar	Jesús Portillo	6 May 1895	28 April 1897
Manuel Estrada Cabrera	Gen. Manuel Soto	28 April 1897	26 April 1898
Feliciano Aguilar	Gen. Felipe Cruz	26 April 1898	29 April 1899
Manuel Morales Tovar	Gen. Vicente Orantes	29 April 1899	8 May 1900
Manuel Morales Tovar	Gen. Luis Molina	8 May 1900	13 May 1902
José María Reina Andrade	Gen. Luis Molina	26 June 1902	30 April 1903
Gen. Mariano Serrano Muñoz	Francisco Alarcón	30 April 1903	28 April 1904
Francisco Anguiano	Francisco Alarcón	28 April 1904	24 May 1907
Gen. Mariano Serrano Muñoz	Juan Barrios M.	24 May 1907	29 April 1910
Matías J. López	Gen. Manuel Duarte	29 April 1910	14 May 1911
Gen. Mariano Serrano Muñoz	Gen. Manuel Duarte	14 May 1911	31 May 1912
Col. Ignacio López Andrade	Gen. Manuel Duarte	31 May 1912	30 April 1917
Gen. Mariano Serrano Muñoz	Gen. Manuel Duarte	30 April 1917	13 April 1920
Carlos Herrera	José Ernesto Zelaya	13 April 1920	12 April 1921

== 1921 ==
First Vice President	Second Vice President	Third Vice president	Took office	Left office
José Ernesto Zelaya	Federico Castañeda Godoy	Maximiliano de León	12 April 1921	8 December 1921

== 1921–1928 ==
First Vice President	Second Vice President	Took office	Left office
Gen. José María Orellana	Alberto Mencos	8 December 1921	27 April 1922
Gen. Jorge Ubico	R. Felipe Solares	27 April 1922	28 April 1923
Gen. Margarito Ariza	Francisco Fuentes	28 April 1923	3 May 1924
Gen. Aurelio Recinos	Gen. Antonio Monterroso	3 May 1924	28 April 1925
Lazaro Chacón	Federico Aguilar Valenzuela	28 April 1925	18 December 1926
Gen. Miguel Larrave	Federico Aguilar Valenzuela	18 December 1926	30 April 1927
Gen. Miguel Larrave	Gen. Mauro De León	30 April 1927	15 March 1928

== 1928–1944 ==
First Vice President	Second Vice President	Third Vice president	Took office	Left office
Gen. Mauro de León	Rodolfo Sandoval	Col. Baudilio Santos Deroga	26 March 1928	15 March 1929
Gen. Rodolfo A. Mendoza	Arturo Ramirez	Antonio Rivera	15 March 1929	15 March 1930
Mario León	Baudilio Palma	Luis Chacón	15 March 1930	1 January 1931
José María Reina Andrade	Gen. José Reyes	Gen. Rodrigo G. Solórzano	1 January 1931	15 March 1931
Mariano J. López	Gen. Rodrigo G. Solórzano	Manuel Franco R.	15 March 1931	15 March 1932
Gen. Factor Méndez	Col. Pedro Reyes Reinelas	Miguel T. Alvarado	15 March 1932	15 March 1933
Gen. Factor Méndez	Col. Pedro Reyes Reinelas	Felipe Samayoa	15 March 1933	15 March 1934
Gen. Pedro Reyes Reinelas	Mariano J. López	Col. Carlos Enríquez Barrios	15 March 1934	15 March 1935
Gen. Pedro Reyes Reynuelas	Gen. Carlos Jurado R.	José Mariano Trabanino	15 March 1935	15 March 1936
Eduardo Pérez Figueroa	Gen. Carlos Jurado R.	Gen. Factor Méndez	15 March 1936	15 March 1937
Gen. Pedro Reyes Reynelas	Eduardo Pérez Figueroa	Gen. Carlos Jurado R.	15 March 1937	15 March 1938
Escolástico de León	Gen. Demetrio Maldonado	Gen. Juan Alonso	15 March 1938	15 March 1939
Mariano López	Gen. Demetrio Maldonado	Gen. Juan B. Alojos	15 March 1939	15 March 1940
Mariano López	Gen. Demetrio Maldonado	Gen. Juan Alonso	15 March 1940	15 March 1941
Mariano López	Gen. Demetrio Maldonado	Gen. Pedro Reyes Reynelas	15 March 1941	15 March 1942
Gen. Demetrio Maldonado	Carlos Herrera Dorián	Gen. Pedro Reyes Renelas	15 March 1942	4 July 1944
Gen. Federico Ponce Vaides	Gen. Domingo Solares	Ramón Calderón	4 July 1944	28 November 1944

== 1948–1951 ==
Vice President	Took office	Left office
Mario Monteforte Toledo	15 March 1948	15 March 1951

== 1956–1966 ==
First Vice President	Second Vice President	Took office	Left office	President
Miguel Ortiz Passarelli	Col. Juan Francisco Oliva	15 March 1956	22 March 1957	Carlos Castillo Armas
Luis Arturo González López	Col. Guillermo Flores Avendaño	22 March 1957	9 October 1957	Carlos Castillo Armas
Col. Luis Urrutia de León	Carlos Enrique Guillén Rodas	9 October 1957	25 March 1958	Guillermo Flores Avendaño
Clemente Marroquín Rojas	Crisóstomo Castillo	25 March 1958	18 March 1959	Miguel Ydígoras Fuentes
Manuel Ralda Ochoa	Alberto J. Urrutia Vasconcelos	18 March 1959	23 March 1960	Miguel Ydígoras Fuentes
Abrahan Cabrera Cruz	Col. José Francisco Gómez Carranza	23 March 1960	30 May 1961	Miguel Ydígoras Fuentes
Col. Catalino Chávez Pérez	Óscar Ubico Zebadúa	30 May 1961	16 March 1962	Miguel Ydígoras Fuentes
Col. Ernesto Molina Arreaga	Rubén Flores Avendaño	16 March 1962	15 March 1963	Miguel Ydígoras Fuentes
Col. Catalino Chávez Pérez	Joaquín Montenegro Paniagua	15 March 1963	1 July 1966	Enrique Peralta Azurdia

== 1966 onwards ==
No.	Portrait	Name (Birth–Death)	Term	Party	Election	President
1		Clemente Marroquín (1897–1978)	1 July 1966 – 1 July 1970	Independent	1966	Julio Méndez Montenegro
2		Eduardo Cáceres (1906–1980)	1 July 1970 – 1 July 1974	Independent	1970	Carlos Arana Osario
3		Mario Sandoval Alarcón (1923–2003)	1 July 1974 – 1 July 1978	MLN	1974	Kjell Laugerud García
4		Francisco Villagrán Kramer (1927–2011)	1 July 1978 – 1 September 1980	Independent	1978	Romeo Lucas García
5		Óscar Mendoza Azurdia (1917–1995)	1 September 1980 – 23 March 1982	MLN	––	Romeo Lucas García
Position vacant (23 March 1982 – 8 August 1983)
6		Rodolfo Lobos Zamora (1936–1997)	8 August 1983 – 14 January 1986	Military	––	Óscar Mejía Víctores
7		Roberto Carpio (1930–2022)	14 January 1986 – 14 January 1991	DCG	1985	Vinicio Cerezo
8		Gustavo Espina (1946–2024)	14 January 1991 – 1 June 1993	MAS	1990	Jorge Serrano Elías
Position vacant (1 June 1993 – 18 June 1993)
9		Arturo Herbruger (1912–1999)	18 June 1993 – 14 January 1996	Independent	1993	Ramiro de León Carpio
10		Luis Flores Asturias (1947)	14 January 1996 – 14 January 2000	PAN	1995	Álvaro Arzú
11		Juan Francisco Reyes (1938–2019)	14 January 2000 – 14 January 2004	FRG	1999	Alfonso Portillo
12		Eduardo Stein (1946)	14 January 2004 – 14 January 2008	GANA	2003	Óscar Berger
13		Rafael Espada (b. 1944)	14 January 2008 – 14 January 2012	UNE	2007	Álvaro Colom
14		Roxana Baldetti (b. 1962)	14 January 2012 – 8 May 2015	PP	2011	Otto Pérez Molina
Position vacant (8 May 2015 – 14 May 2015)						Otto Pérez Molina
15		Alejandro Maldonado (b. 1936)	14 May 2015 – 3 September 2015	Independent	2015	Otto Pérez Molina
Position vacant (3 September 2015 – 16 September 2015)
16		Alfonso Fuentes Soria (b. 1947)	16 September 2015 – 14 January 2016	Independent	2015	Alejandro Maldonado
17		Jafeth Cabrera (b. 1948)	14 January 2016 – 14 January 2020	FCN	2015	Jimmy Morales
18		Guillermo Castillo Reyes (b. 1966)	14 January 2020 – 14 January 2024	VAMOS	2019	Alejandro Giammattei
Position vacant (14 January 2024 – 15 January 2024)
19		Karin Herrera (b. 1967)	15 January 2024 (Note: Herrara's planned inauguration was delayed due to lack of approval for event's congressional delegation) – Incumbent	Semilla	2023	Bernardo Arévalo

== See also ==
- List of current vice presidents
