= Luis Francisco Ortega Menaldo =

Guatemalan politician

Luis Francisco Ortega Menaldo (born 1943) is a Guatemalan politician. He has been a prominent figure in Guatemalan politics and society since the 1970s, when he gained prominence as a military intelligence officer in the country's public finance ministry during the Luis Garcia administration. Throughout much of Guatemala's 36-year civil war, Ortega Menaldo was heavily involved in monitoring leftist-guerrilla activities. During Ortega's post as the director of military intelligence, the American Drug Enforcement Administration "coordinated its operations with military intelligence," giving Ortega "access to valuable information about interdiction and eradication efforts." He married former president General Carlos Arana's daughter, having 3 children, Francisco Ortega Jr, Enrique Ortega and Gabriela Ortega. Ortega Menaldo was one of the military bosses in Guatemala, one of the most feared or respected soldiers, depending on the side. He was involved with the criminal network, "La Cofradia" and "El Sindicato". All this according to trials between 2000 and 2002, after the network was dismantled during the Álvaro Arzú government. The evidence implicated several high-ranking military personnel, among whom General Francisco Ortega Menaldo stood out.
