= Alejandro Maldonado =

Statesmen and 49th President of Guatemala

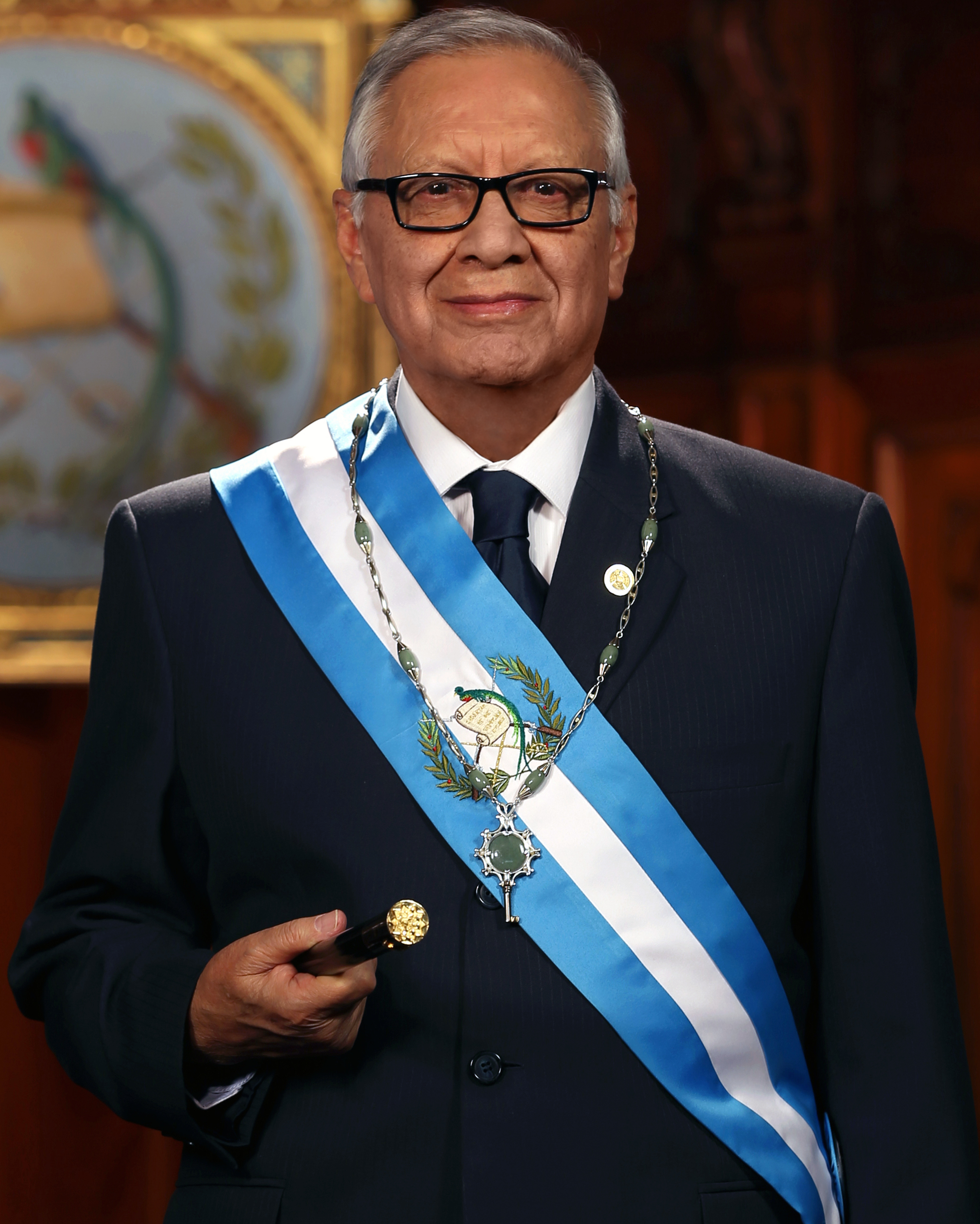
- Official portrait, 2015

49th President of Guatemala
- In office 3 September 2015 – 14 January 2016
- Vice President: Alfonso Fuentes
- Preceded by: Otto Pérez Molina
- Succeeded by: Jimmy Morales

14th Vice President of Guatemala
- In office 14 May 2015 – 3 September 2015
- President: Otto Pérez Molina
- Preceded by: Roxana Baldetti
- Succeeded by: Alfonso Fuentes

Minister of Foreign Affairs
- In office 6 June 1993 – 14 January 1996
- President: Ramiro de León Carpio
- Preceded by: Gonzalo Menéndez
- Succeeded by: Eduardo Stein

Minister of Education
- In office 1 July 1970 – 1 July 1974
- President: Carlos Arana Osorio
- Preceded by: Carlos Martínez Durán
- Succeeded by: Guillermo Putzeys
Additional positions
Deputy of the Central American Parliament
In office 27 January 2016 – 14 January 2020 Serving with Alfonso Fuentes Soria
President	Jimmy Morales
Preceded by	Álvaro Colom
Succeeded by	Jimmy Morales
Constituency	Former President of Guatemala
Member of the Court of Constitutionality of Guatemala
In office 14 April 2006 – 14 May 2015
Nominated by	Congress of Guatemala
Preceded by	Nery Saúl Dighero Herrera
Succeeded by	Gloria Patricia Porras
In office 14 April 1996 – 14 April 2001
Nominated by	Supreme Court of Justice
Preceded by	Edmundo Vásquez Martínez
Succeeded by	Rodolfo Rohrmoser
In office 9 June 1986 – 14 April 1991
Nominated by	Vinicio Cerezo
Preceded by	Position established
Succeeded by	Josefina Vargas de Machado
First Vice President of Congress
In office 14 January 2005 – 14 January 2006 Serving with Roxana Baldetti and Leonel Rodríguez
President	Jorge Méndez Herbruger
Preceded by	Rubén Darío Morales Veliz
Succeeded by	Oliverio García Rodas
Deputy of the Congress
In office 1 July 1966 – 1 July 1970; 1 July 1984 – 1 July 1986; 14 January 2004 – 14 April 2006
Constituency	National List

Personal details
- Born: Alejandro Maldonado Aguirre; 6 January 1936 (age 90) Guatemala City, Guatemala
- Party: National Liberation Movement (Before 1978); National Renewal Party (1978–1990); Unionist Party (2002–2006); Independent (2006–present)
- Other political affiliations: National Opposition Union (1982)
- Spouse(s): Mariem Lutomirsky (div.); Ana Fagianni
- Children: 4 sons: Alejandro Maldonado Lutomirsky Jaime Maldonado Lutomirsky Mario Maldonado Lutomirsky Alejandro Maldonado Faggiani
- Cabinet: Cabinet of Alejandro Maldonado
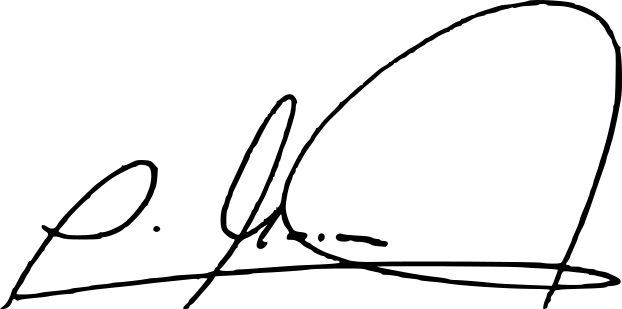
- Signature

Alejandro Baltazar Maldonado Aguirre (born 6 January 1936) is a Guatemalan statesman who served as the president of Guatemala following the Congress' acceptance of the resignation of President Otto Pérez Molina on 3 September 2015.

He was elected as vice president by Congress on 14 May 2015, after his predecessor, Roxana Baldetti, resigned amid allegations of corruption. Before becoming vice president, he served as a constitutional judge, congressional deputy, ambassador to the United Nations, and political leader, including a failed presidential bid in 1982. He was Minister of Education from 1970 to 1974 and Minister of Foreign Affairs from 1995 to 1996.

== Early life and political activities ==
Born in Guatemala City, Maldonado graduated from San Carlos University with a degree in law.

From the 1960s onwards, he was a member of the far-right National Liberation Movement political party (Movimiento de Liberacion Nacional or MLN), alleged to have started the use of death squads against communists. He was also Minister of Education under the military regime of Arana Osorio (1970–1974) and defended Guatemala before the United Nations when the international community isolated the military regime of Lucas García (1978–1982) for its gross human rights violations.

In the 1980s, he formed the National Renewal Party and joined a coalition with Guatemalan Christian Democracy in the 1982 election. Maldonado placed third in a blatantly rigged election, which he may have won had the contest been free and fair, which was followed by a military coup. In 1985, he was again a presidential candidate for his party but placed seventh out of eight candidates and had only one seat in Congress. He would continue to hold numerous public posts, including that of Foreign Minister.

Later, Maldonado served as a judge on the Constitutional Court judge on three occasions.

One week after his appointment as Vice President in May 2015, protesters sought his resignation because he had overturned the guilty verdict in the Ríos Montt trial.

== Public positions held ==
- 1956: Member of the Guatemala City Council
- 1966–1970: Congressional deputy, for the National Liberation Movement
- 1970–1974: Minister of Education (under President Arana Osorio)
- 1974–1976: Ambassador to the United Nations (New York City)
- 1978–1980: Ambassador to the United Nations (Geneva)
- 1984–1986: Deputy to the National Constituent Assembly
- 1986–1991: Magistrate of the Constitutional Court (incl. 1989–1991, President)
- 1991–1995: Ambassador to Mexico
- 1995–1996: Minister of Foreign Affairs (under President de León Carpio)
- 1996–2001: Magistrate of the Constitutional Court (incl. 1997–1998, President)
- 2004–2006: Congressional deputy, for the Unionist Party
- 2006–2011: Magistrate of the Constitutional Court (incl. 2006–2007, President)
- 2015: Vice President of the Republic
- 2015–2016: President of the Republic

=== Vice Presidency (2015) ===
Maldonado served as Vice President of Guatemala from his selection to the position following the resignation of Roxana Baldetti on 14 May 2015, until his accession as president on 3 September 2015.

=== Presidency (2015–2016) ===
Maldonado, as vice president, ascended into the presidency of Guatemala upon the confirmation by the Congress of Guatemala of the resignation of President Otto Pérez Molina.

Political offices
Preceded by Otto Pérez Molina	President of Guatemala; 2015–2016	Succeeded by Jimmy Morales
Preceded by Roxana Baldetti	Vice President of Guatemala; 2015	Succeeded by Alfonso Fuentes Soria
