= Roxana Baldetti =

Guatemalan politician (born 1962)

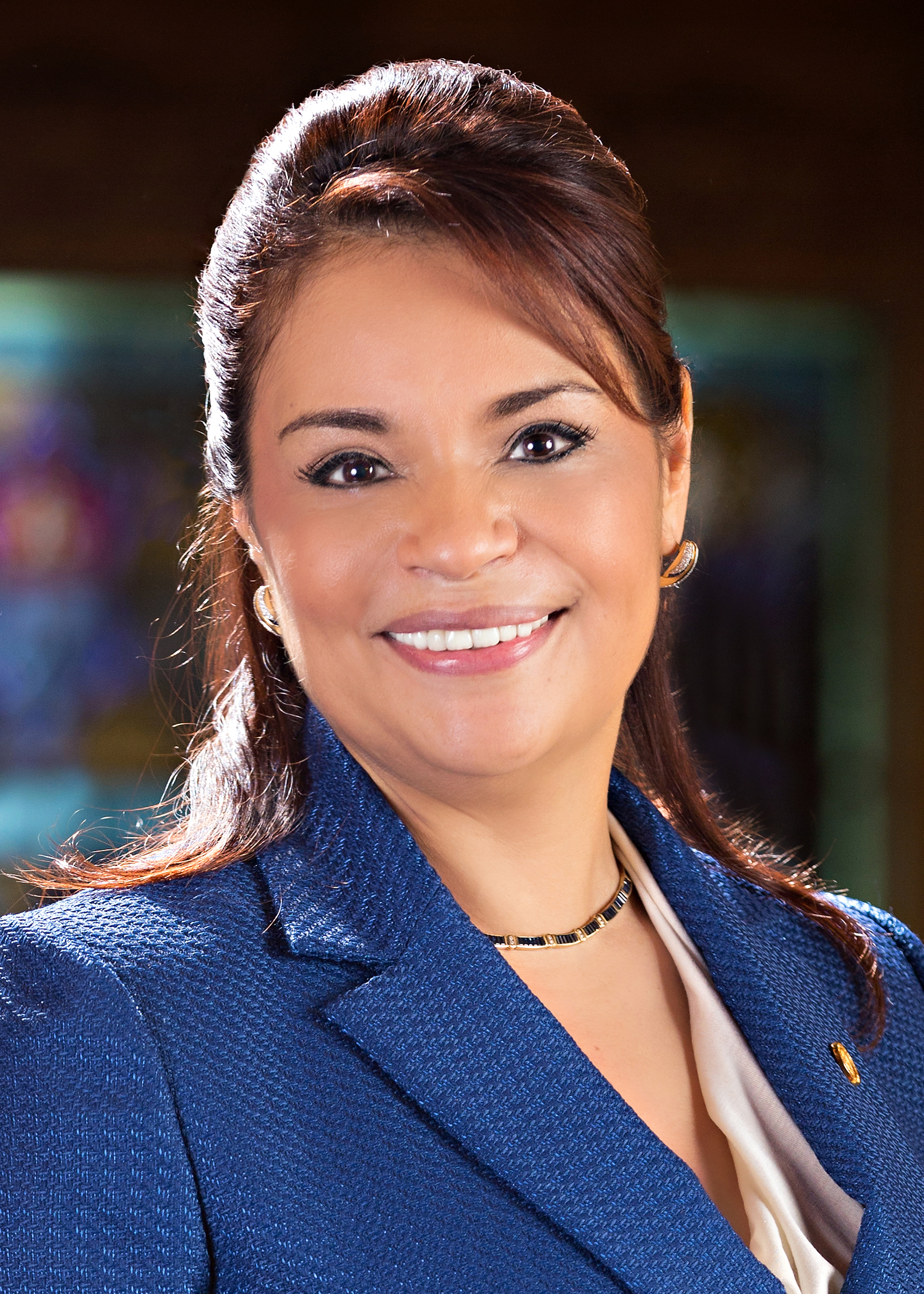
- Official portrait, 2012

13th Vice President of Guatemala
- In office January 14, 2012 – May 9, 2015
- President: Otto Pérez Molina
- Preceded by: Rafael Espada
- Succeeded by: Alejandro Maldonado

Deputy in the Congress of Guatemala
- In office January 14, 2008 – March 14, 2011

Second General Secretary of the Patriotic Party
- In office January 20, 2009 – September 14, 2014
- Preceded by: Otto Pérez Molina
- Succeeded by: Valentín Gramajo

Personal details
- Born: Ingrid Roxana Baldetti Elías; May 13, 1962 (age 64) Guatemala City Guatemala
- Party: Patriotic Party
- Spouse: Mariano Paz
- Children: Luis Pedro Paz Baldetti; Mario Paz Baldetti
- Education: Universidad de San Carlos de Guatemala
- Website: Official website (2010 archive)

Ingrid Roxana Baldetti Elías (born May 13, 1962) is a Guatemalan politician who served as the first female Vice President of Guatemala from 2012 until her resignation amid a corruption scandal in 2015. In 2018, she was sentenced to 15½ years in prison for illicit association, fraud, and influence peddling, and to 16 years in 2022 for illicit association and customs fraud for her part in the La Linea corruption ring.

== Early life ==
Baldetti was born on May 13, 1962, in Guatemala City to Alejandro Baldetti and Gladys Elías de Baldetti. She was raised by her mother, who owned a beauty salon, in a conservative, Catholic household in the working-class neighborhood Colonia Primero de Julio neighborhood of Guatemala City. She has two brothers. Baldetti attended Colegio Monte Carmelo for primary school and graduated from El Sagrado Corazón de Jesús in Guatemala City's Centro Histórico neighborhood as a primary education teacher. In 1997, she obtained a bachelor's degree in journalism at the University of San Carlos of Guatemala.

Baldetti was first runner-up in the 1980 Miss Guatemala competition.

== Career ==
After working as an elementary school substitute teacher, Baldetti started her career in journalism on the news program Aquí el Mundo. She then co-founded TV Noticias and worked at Univisión as a correspondent from Guatemala for the show Primer Impacto. In the 1990s, she was appointed to the Ministry of Foreign Affairs by President Jorge Serrano Elías and worked as Press Secretary. She has been accused of heading censorship of the media in Serrano's favor, which she denies. At this time, she worked with the United Nations on a national level to promote women's rights and attended conferences in partnership with Kellogg's Central America. She left the Press Office in 1994 after being accused by the State of taking equipment from the office. She did not attend her court date, and the case was eventually dropped without resolution due to lack of substantial evidence.

Baldetti spent the next several years in a variety of related spaces: she formed an advertisement production company, taught public relations courses, and finished her journalism degree. In 2000, she co-founded the Patriot Party (PP) with Otto Pérez Molina, whom she had met while working for Serrano, and was elected to Congress as a national-list representative (as opposed to a district-specific representative). She held the role of Block Head starting in 2007. In June 2009, she became PP's General Secretary and the party's leader in Congress.

As required by law, she resigned from Congress ahead of the 2011 Guatemalan general election after formalizing her candidacy as vice president on Pérez's ticket. Part of their platform was focused on fighting corruption, something Baldetti had worked on while in Congress. They won the November elections and she became Guatemala's first-ever female vice president. They took office on January 14, 2012.

Outside of her governmental work, she founded a beauty products company, Maorlis SA, and owned a spa and a hair salon chain. Some of her businesses were later implicated as front organizations during the La Linea corruption case.

=== El Periódico article ===
In 2013, Guatemalan newspaper El Periódico published an article outlining Baldetti's purchases of multi-million dollar homes, luxury goods, and frequent travel, and her fortune was estimated to be around 10 million dollars, significantly exceeding what she should have acquired on her salary. The newspaper wrote that she allegedly spent $2,000 worth of government money to buy "private gifts like Swiss chocolates, French perfumes and Ron Zacapa Centenario" and raised suspicions about photographs of drug trafficker Chacón Rossell at Baldetti's birthday party. Her two Tecpán farms and US$13.4 million helicopter were thought to be gifts from alleged PP supporters.

In response to the investigation into the unexplained wealth, a Guatemalan judge initiated legal proceedings against the editor of El Periódico, José Rubén Zamora, including issuing Baldetti a restraining order against him. The Inter American Press Association subsequently denounced the judicial action as a form of censorship. Baldetti denied the published accusations, claimed she did not know Rossell, and stated that she had worked hard for what she had.

=== Resignation, arrest, and conviction ===
Baldetti resigned from her post as vice president on May 8, 2015, after a United Nations anti-corruption investigation issued arrest warrants for 24 individuals, including her former personal secretary Juan Carlos Monzón Rojas, for involvement in an import bribery scheme. Known as La Línea (the Line), it included officials receiving bribes to reduce duties paid by importers. Baldetti was detained on fraud charges on August 21, 2015, while at the hospital.

Audio from a wiretapped phone call featuring Baldetti's voice was played in court, and wiretaps of others implicated in the scandal refer to her involvement with references to "the R," "the No. 2," and "the Lady." Her arrest was followed by prosecutor Thelma Aldana's call for President Molina to be impeached and protests demanding his resignation, which he eventually succumbed to. On October 27, 2017, Judge Miguel Ángel Gálvez of Guatemala City ordered Baldetti, Pérez, and another 26 people, including former senior officials from Guatemala's customs duty system, to face trial on charges related to bribes channeled to officials helping businesses evade customs duties.

On October 9, 2018, Baldetti was sentenced to 15½ years in prison for illicit association, fraud, and influence peddling related to the issuance of government contracts to an Israeli company to clean Lake Amatitlán, something she did without first submitting the requisite environmental paperwork. Her brother Mario Alejandro was also charged with corruption.

On January 18, 2022, another La Linea-related trial began for Baldetti, where she served as Pérez's co-defendant. She was sentenced on 7 December 2022 to 16 years in prison for the graft case but can appeal. In March 2023, the judge granted permission for Baldetti to be transported from the prison to her home four days a week to receive pre-operative treatment for back problems.

In 2017, she was acquitted of cocaine trafficking charges in the United States.

== Personal life ==
In 1987, she married Mariano Paz, a farmer from San Marcos with an agricultural distribution business. They have two sons, Luis Pedro (born in the late 1980s) and Mario (born c. 1991).

Jorge Serrano Elías was reported to be her uncle, but other sources refute this. In a radio interview, Baldetti denied ever claiming relation to him.

Political offices
Preceded by Rafael Espada	Vice President of Guatemala; 2012–2015	Succeeded by Alejandro Maldonado Aguirre
