= Otto Pérez Molina =

President of Guatemala from 2012 to 2015

Brigadier General Otto Pérez Molina
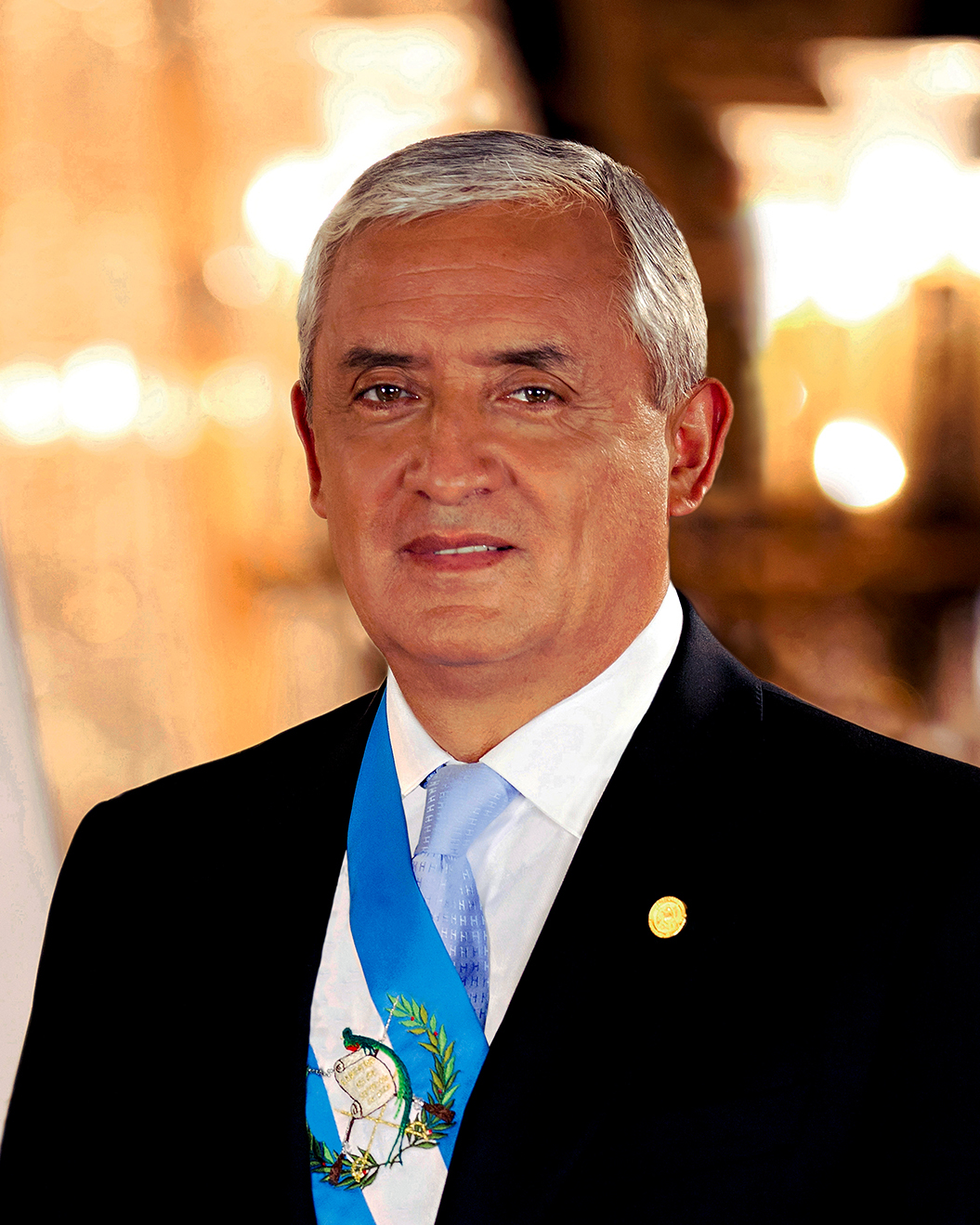
- Official portrait, 2012

48th President of Guatemala
- In office 14 January 2012 – 3 September 2015
- Vice President: Roxana Baldetti; Alejandro Maldonado
- Preceded by: Álvaro Colom
- Succeeded by: Alejandro Maldonado

Deputy of the Congress of Guatemala
- In office 14 January 2004 – 14 January 2008
- Constituency: National List

Personal details
- Born: Otto Fernando Pérez Molina; 1 December 1950 (age 75) Guatemala City, Guatemala
- Party: Patriot Party
- Spouse: Rosa Leal de Pérez (m. 1970; died 2025)
- Children: 2
- Education: School of the Americas; Inter-American Defense College
- Cabinet: Cabinet of Otto Pérez Molina
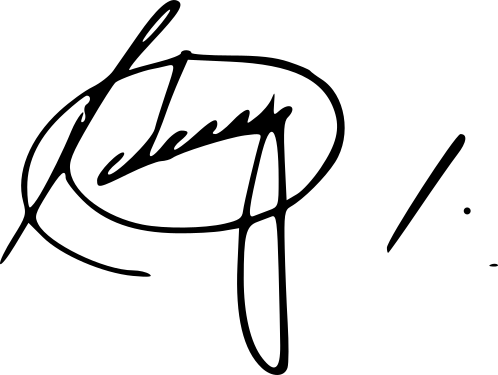
- Signature

Military service
- Allegiance: Guatemala
- Branch/service: Guatemalan Army
- Years of service: 1966–2000
- Rank: Brigadier General

Otto Fernando Pérez Molina (born December 1, 1950) is a Guatemalan politician and retired general who served as the 48th president of Guatemala from 2012 to 2015. Standing as the Patriotic Party (Partido Patriota) candidate, he lost the 2007 presidential election but prevailed in the 2011 presidential election. During the 1990s, before entering politics, he served as Director of Military Intelligence, Presidential Chief of Staff under President Ramiro de León Carpio, and as the chief representative of the military for the Guatemalan Peace Accords. On being elected President, he called for the legalization of drugs.

On September 2, 2015, beset by corruption allegations and having been stripped of his immunity by Congress the day earlier, Pérez presented his resignation. He was arrested on September 3, 2015. Following his arrest, Pérez remained in prison until he was released on bond in January 2024; prior to his release, Pérez received convictions and jail sentences in 2022 and 2023.

== Military career ==
Pérez is a graduate of Guatemala's National Military Academy (Escuela Politécnica), the School of the Americas, and of the Inter-American Defense College.

He has served as Guatemala's Director of Military Intelligence and as inspector-general of the army. In 1983, he was a member of the group of army officers who backed Defence Minister Óscar Mejía's coup d'état against de facto president Efraín Ríos Montt.

While serving as chief of military intelligence in 1993, he was instrumental in forcing the departure of President Jorge Serrano. The president had attempted a "self-coup" by dissolving Congress and appointing new members to the Supreme Court (Corte Suprema de Justicia). (See 1993 Guatemalan constitutional crisis.)

In the wake of that event, Guatemala's human rights ombudsman, Ramiro de León Carpio, succeeded as president, according to the constitution. He appointed Pérez as his presidential chief of staff, a position he held until 1995. Considered a leader of the Guatemalan Army faction that favored a negotiated resolution of the 30-year-long Guatemalan Civil War, Pérez represented the military in the negotiations with guerrilla forces. They achieved the 1996 Peace Accords.

Between 1998 and 2000, Pérez represented Guatemala on the Inter-American Defense Board.

== Political career ==
In February 2001, he founded the Patriotic Party. In the 2003 general election on 9 November 2003, Pérez was elected to Congress.

He was the candidate of the Patriotic Party in the 2007 presidential election, campaigning under the slogan "Mano dura, cabeza y corazón" ("Firm hand, head and heart"), advocating a hard-line approach to rising crime in the country. After receiving the second-largest number of votes in the initial contest on 9 September, he lost the election to Álvaro Colom of the National Unity of Hope in the second round on 4 November 2007.

During the 2007 presidential campaign, several members of the Patriotic Party were killed by armed assailants. Victims included Aura Marina Salazar Cutzal, an indigenous woman who was secretary to the party's congressional delegation and an assistant to Pérez.

=== Presidency (2012–2015) ===
Pérez was finally elected in the November 2011 presidential election with 54% of the vote and took office on 14 January 2012. Pérez was the first former military official to be elected to the presidency since Guatemala's return to democratic elections in 1986.

He proposed the legalization of drugs when he first became president while attending the United Nations General Assembly, as he said that the war on drugs has proven to be a failure.

==== Corruption charges, arrest and trial ====
In April 2015, international prosecutors, with help from the UN, presented evidence of a customs corruption ring ("La Línea") in which discounted tariffs were exchanged for bribes from importers; prosecutors learned of the call through wiretaps and financial statements. Vice President Roxana Baldetti resigned on 8 May and was arrested for her involvement on 21 August. On 21 August, Guatemalan prosecutors presented evidence of Pérez's participation in the corruption ring. Congress, in a 132–0 vote, stripped Pérez Molina of prosecutorial immunity on 1 September 2015, and he presented his resignation from the Presidency on 2 September.

On 14 September, after a court hearing in which charges and evidence against him were presented, he was arrested and sent to the Matamoros prison in Guatemala City. Vice President Alejandro Maldonado Aguirre was appointed to serve the remainder of Pérez's 4-year term in office (due to end on 14 January 2016).

On 27 October 2017, Judge Miguel Ángel Gálvez of Guatemala City ordered Pérez, Baldetti, and another 26 people, including former senior officials from Guatemala's customs duty system, to stand trial on charges related to bribes channeled to officials helping businesses evade customs duties and Pérez has remained in custody since his 2015 arrest. In May 2021, one of the five corruption and money laundering charges against Pérez was dropped, though it was also agreed that Pérez would still be detained in a military base prison.

On 18 January 2022, Pérez's corruption trial officially began. Baldetti, who was previously convicted in another "La Linea" related trial, was named as his co-defendant.

On 7 December 2022, Pérez, along with Baldetti, was sentenced to 16 years in prison.

On 7 September 2023, Perez was sentenced to an additional sentence of eight years in prison after pleading guilty to charges in a separate corruption case. However, the presiding judge also ruled that the sentence could be commuted through payment, with Pérez then making payment in November 2023.

On 4 January 2024, Pérez was released from a prison, where he remained since his 2015 arrest, after posting a bond of more than 10.3 million quetzales. Among the other conditions for his release was an agreement that he would not leave Guatemala and also would check with prosecutors every 30 days. On 7 January, Otto Pérez Lea, son of Pérez, shared a video on Instagram featuring him and his father. In the video, Pérez expressed his appreciation for the support and prayers he had received while imprisoned. He also stated that he never had the intention to "run away" from the country following his resignation from the presidency in 2015.

== Accusations of human rights abuses ==
=== Civil war atrocities ===
In 2011, reports were made, based on the United States' National Security Archives, that Pérez was involved in the scorched earth campaigns of the 1980s under the military dictator Efraín Ríos Montt. Pérez commanded a counterinsurgency team in the Ixil Community in 1982-3 and is accused of ordering the mass murder of civilians, destruction of villages, and resettlement of the remaining population in army-controlled areas. Investigative journalist Allan Nairn interviewed Pérez Molina in Ixil in 1982 and reported that Pérez Molina had been involved in the torture and murder of four suspected guerrillas.

In July 2011, the indigenous organization Waqib Kej presented a letter to the United Nations accusing Pérez of involvement in genocide and torture committed in Quiché during the civil war. Among other evidence, they cited a 1982 documentary in which a military officer whom they claim is Pérez is seen near four dead bodies. In the following scene, a subordinate says that those four were captured alive and taken "to the Major" (allegedly Pérez) and that "they wouldn't talk, not when we asked nicely and not when we were mean [ni por las buenas ni por las malas]."

Although it is clear that Pérez Molina actively participated in a foul counterinsurgency campaign, he has denied any involvement in atrocities. Declassified US documents present him as one of the more progressive Guatemalan military officers who had a hand in the downfall of General Ríos Montt.

==== Allegations of involvement in the killing of Efraín Bámaca ====
In 1992, the guerrilla leader Efraín Bámaca Velásquez disappeared. His wife, American lawyer Jennifer Harbury, has presented evidence that Pérez, who was Director of Military Intelligence at the time, probably issued the orders to detain and torture the commandant.

In 2011, he became the subject of a new investigation into the disappearance of Bámaca.

==== Allegations of involvement in the murder of Catholic bishop Gerardi ====
In his book The Art of Political Murder: Who Killed the Bishop? American journalist Francisco Goldman argues that Pérez Molina may have been present, along with two other high officials, a few blocks from the April 1998 murder of Juan José Gerardi Conedera, a Roman Catholic bishop. Prosecutors in the subsequent trial said that Pérez and the other two men were there to supervise the assassination. Gerardi was murdered two days after the release of a human rights report he helped prepare for the United Nations' Historical Clarification Commission.

== Personal life ==
Pérez was married to Rosa María Leal.

On 21 February 2000, shortly before Pérez planned to launch his new political party, his daughter Lissette was attacked by a gunman. The same day, a woman named Patricia Castellanos Fuentes de Aguilar was shot and killed after meeting with Pérez's wife, Rosa María Leal. On 11 November 2000, Pérez's son, Otto Pérez Leal, was attacked while driving; Pérez Leal's wife and infant daughter were also in the vehicle. Human rights groups said that the attacks were politically motivated.

Political offices
Preceded by Álvaro Colom	President of Guatemala; 2012–2015	Succeeded by Alejandro Maldonado
