= Rafael Espada =

Former Vice President of Guatemala

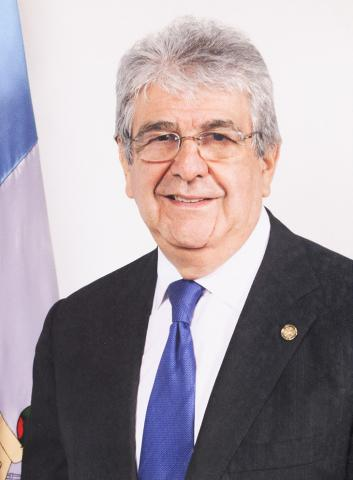
- Official portrait

Vice President of Guatemala
- In office 14 January 2008 – 14 January 2012
- President: Álvaro Colom
- Preceded by: Eduardo Stein
- Succeeded by: Roxana Baldetti

Personal details
- Born: 14 January 1944 (age 81); Guatemala City, Guatemala
- Political party: Republican Party

Dr. José Rafael Espada (born 14 January 1944 in Guatemala City) is a retired cardiothoracic surgeon and politician who served as Vice President of Guatemala from 2008 to 2012 under President Alvaro Colom. Espada unsuccessfully ran for president during the 2023 general election.

== Life and career ==
Espada is well known in the Houston cardiothoracic surgery community. He grew up in Guatemala. From an early age, he wanted to become a doctor. Espada received his doctorate at the Universidad de San Carlos de Guatemala (USAC) in Guatemala and performed his surgery internship residency training in general and thoracic surgery at Baylor College of Medicine. He also received subspecialty training from LeClub Mitrale, France, and other highly recognized international institutions. He was a resident of West University Place, Texas, United States, a city surrounded by Houston.

He was employed at the Methodist DeBakey Heart Center in Houston, Texas, and a professor of cardiothoracic surgery at the Baylor College of Medicine. Espada was known to travel from Houston to Guatemala on a monthly basis to treat underprivileged patients requiring special cardiothoracic procedures. As a cardiac surgeon, he was best known for performing Pulmonary Thromboembolectomies.

He has raised money for a charity hospital in Guatemala. He currently building a state-of-the-art facility specifically designed for cardiothoracic surgery. He performed an average of 10 charity surgeries out of the US every month.

He was also board-certified in General Surgery. While at Houston, he performed nearly 1000 cardiothoracic procedures a year and around 400 in Guatemala. Espada has received numerous awards and recognitions throughout the course of his medical career, including an Honorary Doctorate from the University of Francisco Marroquin in Guatemala, an Honorary Professor from Universidad La Salle in Mexico City, Governor's award from The Chest Foundation, Paul Harris Award from the International Rotary Society, among many others.

Since 1981, he has been related to the Brazilian Vascular Society and received many Brazilian doctors in Houston, Texas, who learned the best techniques on cardiovascular surgery with him. He was the main guest speaker for the Vascular Meeting of the Brazilian Society in Rio de Janeiro in June 1998. In 1992, Espada was honored with an honorary doctorate in science by Universidad Francisco Marroquín.

He recently resigned from Houston's Methodist Hospital/DeBakey Heart Institute and returned to his native Guatemala. There, he successfully ran for Vice President of Guatemala. On 14 January 2008, he took office alongside the President, Álvaro Colom.

== Affiliations ==
Dr. Espada is vice chairman of the board of directors of the Washington-based think-tank Global Financial Integrity.

== Sources ==
- http://www.pinnaclecare.com/finding/mab/physicians/phcphysicianbio.2005-07-28.9726418592/phcphysicianbio_view
- http://www.tmc.edu/tmcnews/05_15_01/page_05.html

Political offices
| Preceded by Eduardo Stein | Vice President of Guatemala; 2008–2012 | Succeeded by Roxana Baldetti |
