= 1950 Guatemalan presidential election =

- 10–12 November 1950
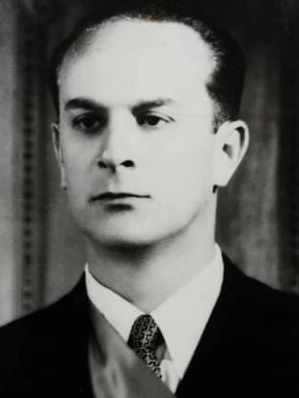

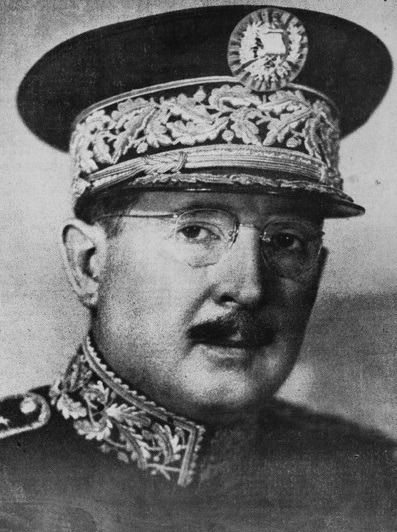

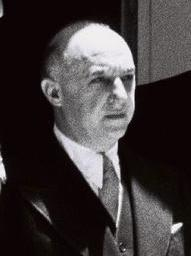
Nominee	Jacobo Árbenz	Miguel Ydígoras	Jorge García Granados
Party	Party of the Guatemalan Revolution	PRDN	People's Party
Popular vote	266,778	76,180	28,897
Percentage	65.44%	18.69%	7.09%
President before election
Juan José Arévalo
PAR
President-elect
Jacobo Árbenz
PAR

Presidential elections were held in Guatemala between 10 and 12 November 1950. The result was a victory for Jacobo Arbenz Guzmán, who received 65.44% of the vote. Voter turnout was 71.6%.

== Results ==
Candidate	Party	Votes	%
Jacobo Árbenz	PAR–PIN–PS–PRN	266,778	65.44
Miguel Ydígoras Fuentes	PRDN–PUA–PUD	76,180	18.69
Jorge García Granados	People's Party	28,897	7.09
Víctor Manuel Giordiani	Popular Liberation Front	15,664	3.84
Manuel Galich	Popular Liberation Front (Galich)	7,118	1.75
Clemente Marroquín Rojas	Guatemalan Social Harmony Party	6,589	1.62
José Arcadio Chévez Guillén	Authentic Revolutionary Front of Socialist Orientation	4,041	0.99
Miguel Angel Mendoza	Popular Union	1,684	0.41
Alejandro Valdizón		712	0.17
Total		407,663	100.00
Valid votes		407,663	97.63
Invalid/blank votes		9,907	2.37
Total votes		417,570	100.00
Registered voters/turnout		583,300	71.59
Source: Nohlen

== Bibliography ==
- Villagrán Kramer, Francisco. Biografía política de Guatemala: años de guerra y años de paz. FLACSO-Guatemala, 2004.
- Political handbook of the world 1951. New York, 1952.
- Gleijeses, Piero. 1991. Shattered hope. The Guatemalan Revolution and the United States, 1944–1954. Princeton: Princeton University Press.
- Rodríguez de Ita, Guadalupe. 2003. La participación política en la primavera guatemalteca: una aproximación a la historia de los partidos durante el periodo 1944–1954. México: Universidad Autónoma del Estado de México, Universidad Nacional Autónoma de México.
