= 1950 Guatemalan parliamentary election =

Parliamentary elections were held in Guatemala for half the seats in Congress on 16 December 1950. The Revolutionary Action Party won a plurality of seats.

== Results ==
The other parties winning 12 seats were opposition parties, whilst all independents were pro-government.

Party	Seats
Revolutionary Action Party	15
National Renovation Party	9
Popular Liberation Front	7
Socialist Party	7
Guatemalan Party of Labour	3
National Integrity Party	2
Revolutionary party of National Union	1
Other parties	12
Independents	2
Total	58

== Bibliography ==
- Villagrán Kramer, Francisco. Biografía política de Guatemala: años de guerra y años de paz. FLACSO-Guatemala, 2004.
- Political handbook of the world 1951. New York, 1952.
- Elections in the Americas A Data Handbook Volume 1. North America, Central America, and the Caribbean. Edited by Dieter Nohlen. 2005.
- Gleijeses, Piero. 1991. Shattered hope. The Guatemalan Revolution and the United States, 1944–1954. Princeton: Princeton University Press.
- Rodríguez de Ita, Guadalupe. 2003. La participación política en la primavera guatemalteca: una aproximación a la historia de los partidos durante el periodo 1944–1954. México: Universidad Autónoma del Estado de México, Universidad Nacional Autónoma de México.
