= List of ambassadors of Guatemala to Italy =

Coordinates: 41.941946°N 12.457351°E

Ambassador of Guatemala to Italy
- Incumbent; Karla Gabriela Samayoa Recari since June 24, 2018
- Inaugural holder: Tomás Legarini
- Formation: January 1, 1880

The Guatemalan ambassador to the Italian Government in Rome is the official representative of the Government in Guatemala City to the Government of Italy.

== List of representatives ==
Diplomatic accreditation	Ambassador	Observations	President of Guatemala	List of prime ministers of Italy	Term end
January 1, 1880	Tomás Legarini	In 1880 Tomás Legarini, a subject of Victor Emmanuel III of Italy established the legation of Guatemala in Rome.	Justo Rufino Barrios Auyón	Benedetto Cairoli	1880
April 1, 1885	Martín Barrundia	In April 1885 they created the legation en Italia and he appointed Minister to Don Martín Barrundia.	Manuel Lisandro Barillas Bercián	Agostino Depretis	1892
January 1, 1888	Crisanto Medina	Enviado extraordinario y Minister Plenipotenciario de la República de Guatemala en París	Manuel Lisandro Barillas Bercián	Francesco Crispi	1909
January 1, 1923	Adrián Recinos	Envoy Extraordinary and Minister Plenipotentiary of Guatemala accredited to the governments of France, Italy, Holland, Belgium and Spain. Delegate of Guatemala before the League of Nations. Deputy and President of the Assembly	José María Orellana Pinto	Benito Mussolini	1925
January 1, 1937	Víctor Durán Mollinedo		José María Reina Andrade	Benito Mussolini	1937
February 1, 1949	Jorge Luis Arrióla		Juan José Arévalo	Ferruccio Parri	1957
August 10, 1951	Francesco Cosenza Álvarez	Extraordinary Minister and Minister of Provenance of GUATEMALA	Jacobo Arbenz Guzmán	Ferruccio Parri	
March 5, 1953	Carlo Bossi	with Ambassadorial credentials in Guatemala: duty visit.	Jacobo Arbenz Guzmán	Giuseppe Pella	
November 9, 1957	Ricardo Quiñónez Lemus (Guatemalan diplomat)	Ambassador of Guatemala	Guillermo Flores Avendaño	Adone Zoli	
October 13, 1959	Guillermo Flores Avendaño		Miguel Ydígoras Fuentes	Antonio Segni	
July 19, 1961	Luís Urrutia de Leon	Colonel	Miguel Ydígoras Fuentes	Fernando Tambroni	
June 28, 1963	Roberto Azurdia	Ambassador of Guatemala: Permanent Representative presentation before the FAO, RomeConvenio Internacional para la constitución del Instituto Italo-Latinoamericano	Alfredo Enrique Peralta Azurdia	Giovanni Leone	1968
October 14, 1970	Angelo Arturo Rivera Garcia	Ambassador of the Republic of Guatemala	Carlos Arana Osorio	Emilio Colombo	
May 3, 1974	Eduardo Cabrera Passarelli	Chargé d'affaires	Kjell Eugenio Laugerud García	Aldo Moro	
December 11, 1974	Humberto Vizcaino Leal	presentation of Credentials. (Sala Arazzi di Lilla)	Kjell Eugenio Laugerud García	Aldo Moro	
January 13, 1984	Héctor Mario López Fuentes	presentation of Credentials. (Sala Arazzi di Lilla)	Óscar Humberto Mejía Víctores	Bettino Craxi	
October 24, 1988	Oscar Ernesto Padilla Vidaurre	Ambassador of the Republic of Guatemala: presentation of Credentials (Sala Arazzi di Lilla)	Marco Vinicio Cerezo Arévalo	Ciriaco De Mita	1991
January 1, 1993	Bruno Roberto Deger Battaglia	Minister	Ramiro de León Carpio	Carlo Azeglio Ciampi	1993
January 1, 1999	Rita Claverie de Scioli	Representative Permanente Adjunto de la Republica de Guatemala before the FAO Embajada de la Republica de Guatemala (January 2001 - November 2001)	Álvaro Arzú Irigoyen	Massimo D’Alema	1999
May 23, 1994	Ismael Penedo Sole	1970: Chargé d'affaires	Ramiro de León Carpio	Silvio Berlusconi	2000
January 1, 2001	Mario Alberto Carrera		Alfonso Antonio Portillo Cabrera	Silvio Berlusconi	2003
May 13, 2003	María Elizabeth Reyes Wyld		Alfonso Antonio Portillo Cabrera	Silvio Berlusconi	
December 17, 2004	Francisco Eduardo Bonifaz Rodríguez		Óscar Berger Perdomo	Silvio Berlusconi	2007
July 16, 2012	Maria Sylvia Leticia Wohlers De Meie	Chargé d'affaires	Otto Pérez Molina	Mario Monti	
June 24, 2018	Karla Gabriela Samayoa Recari		Jimmy Morales	Giuseppe Conte	
