= Guatemalan military junta of 1957 =

A Military Government Junta briefly ruled Guatemala from 24 to 26 October 1957. Its members were:

- Colonel Óscar Mendoza Azurdia
- Colonel Roberto Lorenzana Salazar
- Colonel Gonzalo Yurrita Nova

== 1957 Guatemalan coup ==
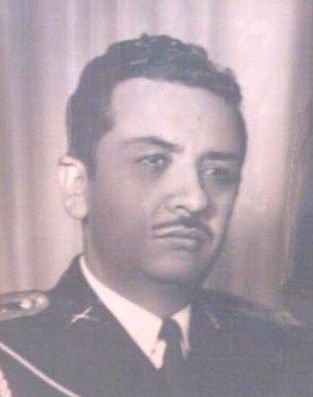
Óscar Mendoza Azurdia, chairman of military junta

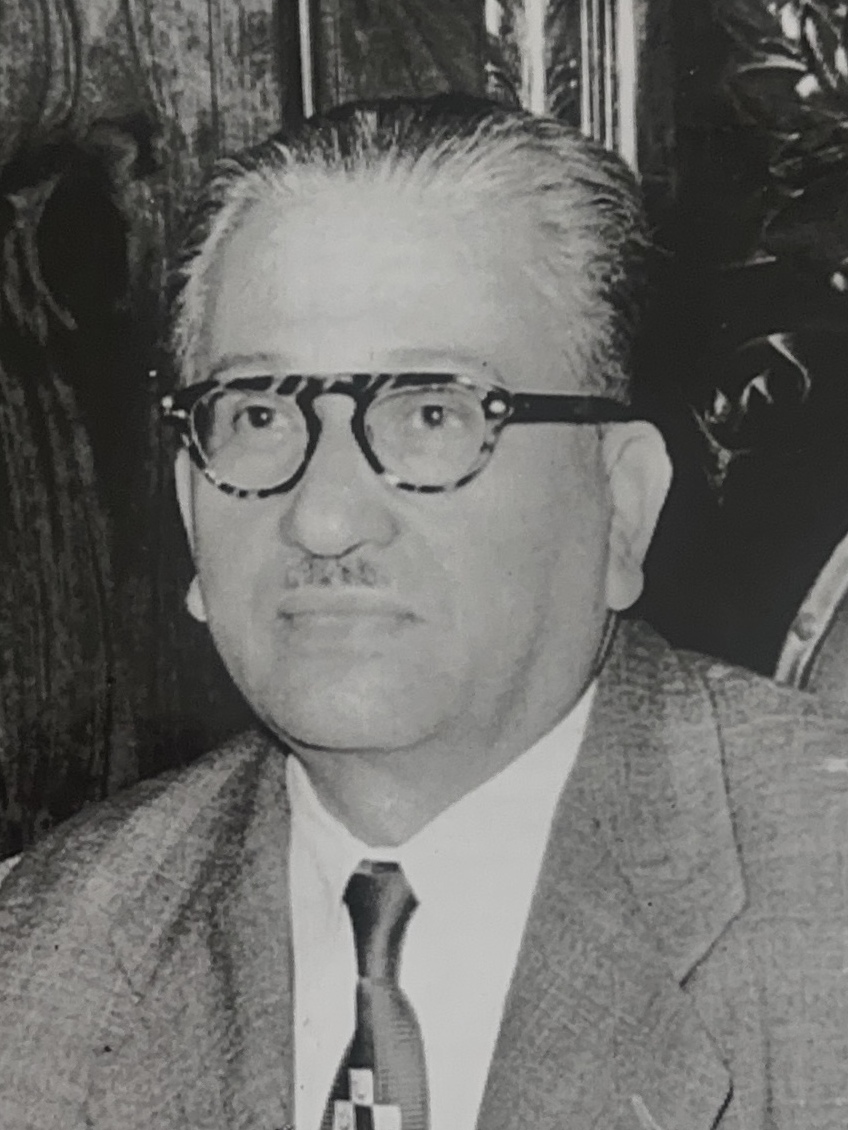
González López, the deposed president

On July 26, 1957, General Castillo Armas, the president of Guatemala, was assassinated by a presidential guard. His vice-president, civilian Luis Arturo González López, was designated provisional president and sworn in the following day. González's goal as interim president and first presidential designate was to call elections within 4 months.

The presidential elections were called on October 20, which gave victory to the civilian Miguel Ortiz Passareli against the military Miguel Ydígoras Fuentes. General Ydígoras denounced the results as electoral fraud. Protests and riots by Ydígoras supporters broke out across the country. The Guatemalan government declared a 30-day state of siege. On October 23, Colonel Juan Francisco Oliva and the army pressured President González to hold new elections to settle the crisis.

The electoral impasse ended abruptly on October 24. A new military movement or coup forced the resignation of González López. A group of 80 officers marched into the National Palace. Under pressure from Defense Minister Juan Francisco Oliva, President González resigned. That night, a long meeting with hundreds of military officers of the Guatemalan army discussed the formation of a military junta. Finally, a three-man junta composed of colonels Óscar Mendoza Azurdia, Roberto Lorenzana and Gonzalo Yurrita Nova seized power.

Following the coup, the election results were nullified by the Guatemalan junta. Guatemala's congress refused to recognize the military junta, leading to another impasse. The Guatemalan Congress sent a delegation to consult with Ambassador Sparks and General Ydígoras on a plan to replace the deposed President González with his second presidential designate, Guillermo Flores Avendaño.

In mediation with the junta, General Ydígoras called on his supporters to stop the demonstrations to solve the crisis. On October 26, the Guatemalan junta agreed to hand over the presidency to Colonel Flores Avendaño. Another election was called in 1958, in which General Ydígoras was elected by congress after a political impasse in which none of the candidates received a majority of the votes.
