= Anti-Communist Unification Party =

Former political party in Guatemala

The Anti-Communist Unification Party (Spanish: Partido de Unificación Anticomunista, PUA) was a political party in Guatemala.

== History ==
The party was formed in 1948 in order to support the candidacy of Francisco Javier Arana in the 1950 presidential elections. However, Arana was killed after threatening to launch a coup in the build-up to the elections, having been considered the main rival to Jacobo Árbenz of the Revolutionary Action Party. The PUA ultimately joined the National Electoral Union (an alliance including the Democratic Unity Party and the National Democratic Reconciliation Party), which nominated Miguel Ydígoras Fuentes as its candidate. Ydígoras finished second to Árbenz in the elections.

The party later became part of the National Anti-Communist Front, supporting Carlos Castillo Armas. It won three seats in the 1955 parliamentary elections. In the 1958 general elections it was part of the alliance nominating José Luis Cruz Salazar, who finished as runner-up to Ydígoras. In the Congressional elections the PUA ran in an alliance with the Republican Party and Guatemalan Christian Democracy, with the three winning 20 of the 66 seats. It was dissolved after the 1963 coup.

In 1983 the party was re-established by Lionel Sisniega Otero Barrios, a former member of the National Liberation Movement (MLN). Barrios had left the MLN after accusations that it was plotting a coup against Ríos Montt. In the 1984 Constitutional Assembly elections the PUA received 4% of the vote and won one of the 88 seats. In the general elections the following year it was one of three parties to nominate Otero as its presidential candidate; he finished last in a field of eight candidates with 2% of the vote. The three parties also ran together in the Congressional elections, failing to win a seat.
