= Árbenz (surname) =

Árbenz is a surname that may refer to the Guatemalan political family of Swiss origin:

- Arabella Árbenz (1940–1965), Guatemalan model and actress
- Jacobo Árbenz (1913–1971), President of Guatemala
- Jacobo Árbenz Vilanova (born 1946), Guatemalan politician
- María Cristina Vilanova Castro de Árbenz (1915–2009), First Lady of Guatemala and wife of Jacobo
