= 1953 Guatemalan parliamentary election =

Parliamentary elections were held in Guatemala for half the seats in Congress between 16 and 18 January 1953. The Revolutionary Action Party won a plurality of seats.

== Results ==
The four other parties were opposition parties, whilst all independents were pro-government.

Party	Votes	%	Seats
Revolutionary Action Party			22
Party of the Guatemalan Revolution			16
National Renovation Party			7
Guatemalan Party of Labour			4
Four other parties			5
Independents			4
Total			58
Total votes	241,318	–	

== Bibliography ==
- Villagrán Kramer, Francisco. Biografía política de Guatemala: años de guerra y años de paz. FLACSO-Guatemala, 2004.
- Political handbook of the world 1953. New York, 1954.
- Elections in the Americas A Data Handbook Volume 1. North America, Central America, and the Caribbean. Edited by Dieter Nohlen. 2005.
- Gleijeses, Piero. 1991. Shattered hope. The Guatemalan Revolution and the United States, 1944-1954. Princeton: Princeton University Press.
- Schlesinger, Stephen and Stephen Kinzer. 1982. Bitter fruit: the untold story of the American coup in Guatemala. New York: Doubleday & Company, Inc.
- Rodríguez de Ita, Guadalupe. 2003. La participación política en la primavera guatemalteca: una aproximación a la historia de los partidos durante el periodo 1944-1954. México: Universidad Autónoma del Estado de México, Universidad Nacional Autónoma de México.
- Silvert, Kalman H. 1954. A study in government: Guatemala. New Orleans: Tulane University.
