= Azurdia =

Azurdia is a surname. Notable people with the surname include:

- Elmar Rene Rojas Azurdia (1942–2018), Guatemalan painters and architect
- Enrique Peralta Azurdia (1908–1997), Guatemalan politician and President of Guatemala
- Margarita Azurdia (1931–1998), Guatemalan painter, poet and writer and artist
- Óscar Mendoza Azurdia (1917–1995), Guatemalan politician and President of Guatemala
- Roberto Azurdia (born 1926), Guatemalan writer, diplomat and physician
