= 1995–96 Guatemalan general election =

- Presidential election
- 12 November 1995 (first round); 7 January 1996 (second round)
- Turnout: 46.80% (first round) ▼9.64pp 36.88% (second round) ▼8.35pp
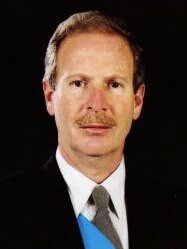

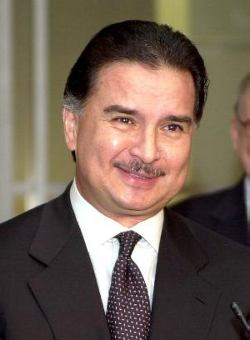
Nominee	Álvaro Arzú	Alfonso Portillo
Party	PAN	PRI
Running mate	Alberto Flores Asturias	Carlos Méndez
Popular vote	671,354	639,404
Percentage	51.22%	48.78%
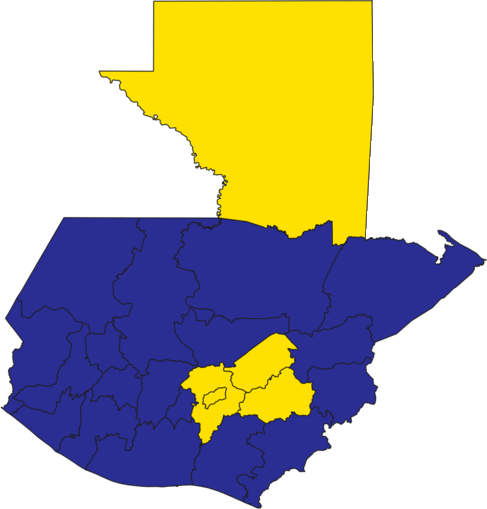
President before election
Ramiro de León Carpio
Independent
President-elect
Álvaro Arzú
PAN

General elections were held in Guatemala on 12 November 1995, with a second round of the presidential elections held on 7 January 1996. Álvaro Arzú of the National Advancement Party won the presidential election, whilst his party also won the Congressional elections. Voter turnout was 46.8% on 12 November and 36.9% on 7 January.

== Results ==
=== President ===
Candidate	Running mate	Party	First round		Second round	
Candidate	Running mate	Party	Votes	%	Votes	%
Álvaro Arzú	Luis Alberto Flores Asturias	National Advancement Party	565,393	36.50	671,354	51.22
Alfonso Portillo	Carlos Aníbal Méndez Cabrera	Guatemalan Republican Front	341,364	22.04	639,404	48.78
Fernando Andrade Díaz-Durán	Lizardo Arturo Sosa López	UCN–DCG–PSD	200,393	12.94		
Jorge Luis González del Valle	Juan León Alvarado	Democratic Front New Guatemala	119,305	7.70		
Acisclo Valladares Molina	Daniel Agustín González Estrada	Progressive Liberating Party	80,761	5.21		
José Luis Chea Urruela	Oscar Rolando Chaclán Sapón	Democratic Union	56,191	3.63		
Luis Rolando Torres Casanova	Oscar Lionel Figueredo Ara	Authentic Integral Development	39,425	2.55		
Héctor Mario López Fuentes	Ulysses Charles Dent Weissenberg	National Liberation Movement	35,675	2.30		
José "Pepe" Fernández	Arturo Eduardo Meyer Maldonado	Progressive Party	25,219	1.63		
Héctor Gramajo	Marco Antonio Rojas de Yapan	PID–FUN	18,060	1.17		
Miguel Ángel Montepeque Contreras	Oscar Rafael Prem Sáenz	Guatemalan Reformist Party	17,471	1.13		
Monchis Godoy Gómez	Arturo Leopoldo Soto Echeverría	National Historic Change	11,344	0.73		
Juan José Rodil Peralta	José Guillermo Echeverría Vielman	People's Party	8,140	0.53		
Ángel Aníbal Guevara	José Arturo López Malumbre	Guatemalan Democratic Party	6,714	0.43		
Carlos Augusto Morales Villatoro	Marco Antonio Villamar Contreras	Popular Alliance 5	6,193	0.40		
Lionel Sisniega Otero Barrios	Héctor Miguel Montenegro Camblor	Nationalist Authentic Centre	6,079	0.39		
Flor de María Alvarado Suárez de Solís	Erik de Jesús Maldonado Arreaga	Popular Democratic Force	5,885	0.38		
Mario Francisco Castejón García Prendes	Oscar Grotewold Solares	Destitute People's Movement	3,119	0.20		
Carlos Alfonso González Quezada	Oscar Emilio Gordillo Díaz	PCN–MPL	2,133	0.14		
Total			1,548,864	100.00	1,310,758	100.00
Valid votes			1,548,864	89.17	1,310,758	95.76
Invalid/blank votes			188,169	10.83	58,070	4.24
Total votes			1,737,033	100.00	1,368,828	100.00
Registered voters/turnout			3,711,589	46.80	3,711,589	36.88
Source: Nohlen, Rosón, TSE

=== Congress ===
Party	National			District			Total seats
Party	Votes	%	Seats	Votes	%	Seats	Total seats
National Advancement Party	645,446	37.76	7	477,232	32.80	36	43
Guatemalan Republican Front	335,195	19.61	4	284,936	19.59	17	21
UCN–DCG–PSD	188,488	11.03	2	30,415	2.09	0	2
Democratic Front New Guatemala	163,600	9.57	2	120,368	8.27	4	6
Progressive Liberating Party	70,565	4.13	0	54,651	3.76	0	0
Democratic Union	68,663	4.02	1	61,979	4.26	1	2
National Liberation Movement	51,315	3.00	0	46,346	3.19	1	1
Authentic Integral Development	48,778	2.85	0	48,703	3.35	0	0
Guatemalan Reformist Party	25,366	1.48	0	26,741	1.84	0	0
Progressive Party	25,200	1.47	0	15,170	1.04	0	0
National Historic Change	16,732	0.98	0	14,119	0.97	0	0
FUN–PID	11,798	0.69	0	12,368	0.85	0	0
People's Party	11,672	0.68	0	8,461	0.58	0	0
Guatemalan Democratic Party	11,458	0.67	0	14,074	0.97	0	0
Nationalist Authentic Centre	10,028	0.59	0	4,937	0.34	0	0
Popular Alliance 5	9,647	0.56	0	6,914	0.48	0	0
Popular Democratic Front	5,092	0.30	0	1,822	0.13	0	0
Destitute People's Movement	3,737	0.22	0	2,510	0.17	0	0
Social Reformist Union	3,402	0.20	0	3,635	0.25	0	0
PCN–MPL	2,102	0.12	0	1,897	0.13	0	0
Guatemalan Party of Labour	896	0.05	0	1,744	0.12	0	0
National Centre Union				86,882	5.97	2	2
Guatemalan Christian Democracy				78,932	5.43	3	3
DCG–PSD				20,548	1.41	0	0
DCG–UCN				14,254	0.98	0	0
Democratic Social Party				6,579	0.45	0	0
UD–PSD				2,904	0.20	0	0
Patriotic Movement Liberty				2,574	0.18	0	0
UCN–PSD				2,281	0.16	0	0
Party of National Reconciliation				860	0.06	0	0
Total	1,709,180	100.00	16	1,454,836	100.00	64	80
Valid votes	1,709,180	86.74		1,454,836	87.31		
Invalid/blank votes	261,212	13.26		211,492	12.69		
Total votes	1,970,392	100.00		1,666,328	100.00		

== Bibliography ==
- Villagrán Kramer, Francisco. Biografía política de Guatemala: años de guerra y años de paz. FLACSO-Guatemala, 2004.
- Political handbook of the world 1995. New York, 1996.
