= Integrity Party =

Integrity Party can mean:

- National Integrity Party, a former political party in Guatemala.
- Integrity Party of Aotearoa New Zealand, a former unregistered political party in New Zealand.
- Advance UK, a political organisation in the United Kingdom formerly named the Integrity Party.
