= Socialist Party (Guatemala) =

Socialist Party Partido Socialista
- Abbreviation: PS
- Founded: 1951
- Dissolved: 1950s
- Split from: PAR
- Ideology: Socialism
- Political position: Left-wing
- National affiliation: PRG

The Socialist Party (Spanish: Partido Socialista, PS) was a political party in Guatemala. The party was formed in 1951 by dissident members of the Revolutionary Action Party. The Socialist Party sought to become the major rallying ground for non-communist elements supporting the government of President Jacobo Árbenz. It included a number of important labor and peasant leaders, and its principal figure was Augusto Charnaud MacDonald, minister of finance in Arbens cabinet. In 1952 the party merged with the National Renovation Party, Revolutionary Action Party, National Integrity Party and Popular Liberation Front, forming the Party of the Guatemalan Revolution.
