= Luis Arturo González López =

Guatemalan politician

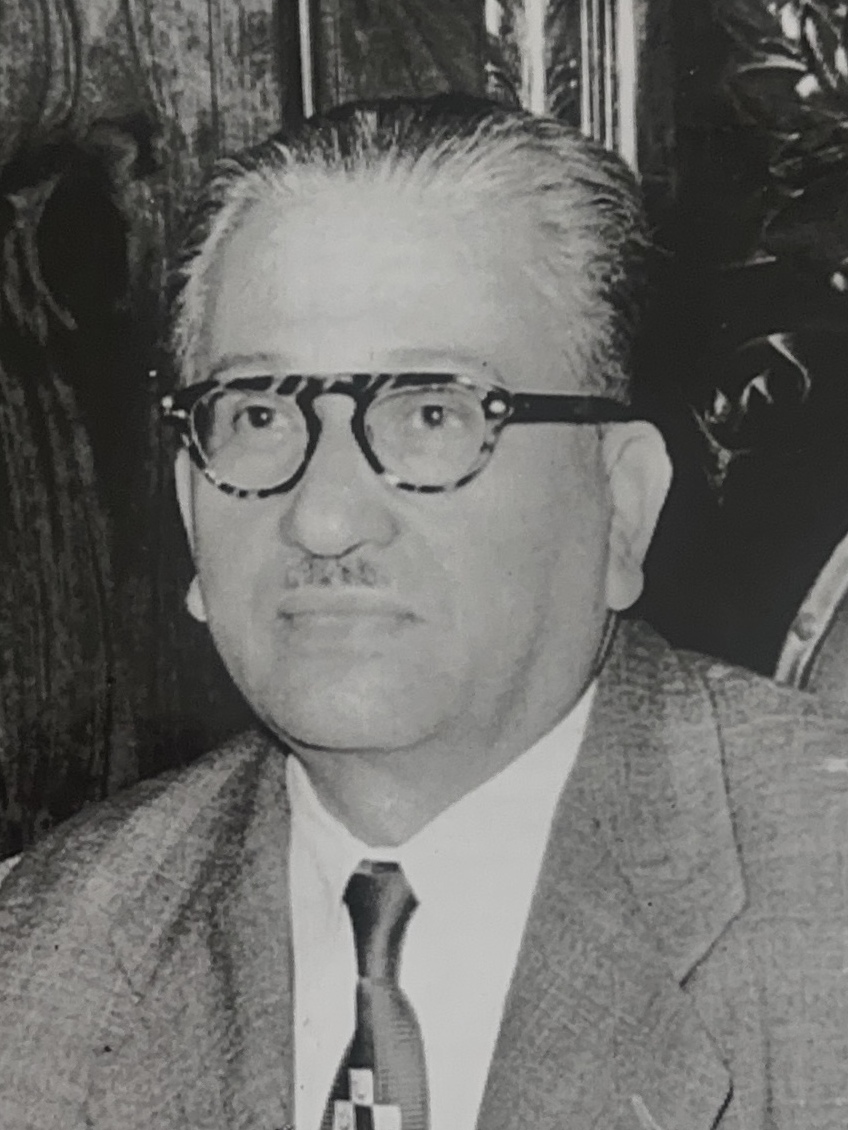
- González López in 1957

29th President of Guatemala
- In office 26 July 1957 – 24 October 1957
- Preceded by: Carlos Castillo Armas
- Succeeded by: Óscar Mendoza Azurdia

Personal details
- Born: 21 December 1900; Zacapa, Guatemala
- Died: 11 November 1965 (aged 64); Guatemala City, Guatemala
- Political party: National Liberation Movement

Luis Arturo González López (21 December 1900 – 11 November 1965) was a Guatemalan attorney and politician who served as the acting President of Guatemala from 27 July 1957 to 24 October 1957. He became president after the assassination of Carlos Castillo Armas, under whom he was designated as first in the presidential line of succession by Congress.

== Biography ==
Born in the town of Zacapa, González López studied law, and served as a judge in several cities. He was a member of the Supreme Court for seven years from 1945 to 1951, before being removed: reports stated that he was removed due to pressure from the communist parties. He was appointed Vice-President to Carlos Castillo Armas in 1957. On 26 July 1957, Castillo Armas was assassinated by a member of the presidential guard in the presidential palace in Guatemala City. González López held the position of "First Presidential Designate", and was sworn in as interim president in Congress on 27 July by means of decree 1191, a document which conditioned him to call elections.

Supporters of Castillo Armas were considering forming a military junta and seizing power, but were dissuaded by Edwin J. Sparks. the U.S. ambassador to Guatemala. The U.S. government preferred to preserve a facade of democracy, rather than have Guatemala revert to a blatant dictatorship. Elections were held in October 1957, complicated by pressure from the U.S. government, the government of Dominica, and the army.

The centrist Miguel Ortiz Passarelli won a plurality in these elections, but supporters of Miguel Ydígoras Fuentes, who had also been a candidate in the election, rioted. The Guatemalan government declared martial law for a period of 30 days. On 24 October, a group of 80 military officers marched into the Presidential palace and replaced González López with a three-person junta led by army Colonel Óscar Mendoza Azurdia. New elections were held in January 1958. Ydígoras Fuentes comfortably won this election and seized power for himself soon after.

Political offices
Preceded by Carlos Castillo Armas; Military Junta	President of Guatemala; 1957	Succeeded by Óscar Mendoza (Military Junta)
