= 1994 Guatemalan parliamentary election =

Parliamentary elections were held in Guatemala on 14 August 1994, following the premature dissolution of Congress during the 1993 constitutional crisis, and in view of implementing constitutional reforms approved in January 1994. The result was a victory for the Guatemalan Republican Front, which won 33 of the 80 seats. Voter turnout was just 21%.

The 1993 constitutional crisis started on 25 May 1993, when the then President Jorge Serrano Elías attempted a self-coup or autogolpe. Serrano suspended the constitution, dissolved Congress and the Supreme Court, imposed censorship and tried to restrict civil liberties. Serrano's actions were met with broad national and international opposition and ruled "illegal" by the Constitutional Court, following which Serrano was forced to resign.

== Results ==
Party	National			District			Total seats
Party	Votes	%	Seats	Votes	%	Seats	Total seats
Guatemalan Republican Front	206,994	32.22	7	172,649	26.61	26	33
National Advancement Party	162,189	25.25	5	172,224	26.54	18	23
Guatemalan Christian Democracy	78,016	12.14	2	84,391	13.01	11	13
National Centre Union	57,155	8.90	1	63,697	9.82	6	7
National Liberation Movement	28,582	4.45	1	36,746	5.66	2	3
Solidarity Action Movement	20,418	3.18	0	23,604	3.64	0	0
Democratic Union	19,732	3.07	0	20,446	3.15	1	1
Revolutionary Party	17,747	2.76	0	18,087	2.79	0	0
Democratic Social Party	13,635	2.12	0	11,117	1.71	0	0
Guatemalan Reformist Party	13,007	2.02	0	16,300	2.51	0	0
Nationalist Authentic Centre	9,692	1.51	0	8,388	1.29	0	0
National Unity Front	6,495	1.01	0	5,901	0.91	0	0
Institutional Democratic Party	5,578	0.87	0	6,201	0.96	0	0
Destitute People's Movement	3,136	0.49	0				0
Progressive Party				5,527	0.85	0	0
Popular Democratic Front				2,583	0.40	0	0
Popular Alliance 5				557	0.09	0	0
Christian Social Party				448	0.07	0	0
Total	642,376	100.00	16	648,866	100.00	64	80
Valid votes	642,376	87.83		648,866	88.80		
Invalid/blank votes	89,017	12.17		81,858	11.20		
Total votes	731,393	100.00		730,724	100.00		

== Bibliography ==
- Villagrán Kramer, Francisco. Biografía política de Guatemala: años de guerra y años de paz. FLACSO-Guatemala, 2004.
- Political handbook of the world 1994. New York, 1995.
- Elections in the Americas A Data Handbook Volume 1. North America, Central America, and the Caribbean. Edited by Dieter Nohlen. 2005.
