= 1980 Guatemalan vice presidential election =

Election in Guatemala

September 12, 1980	1993 →
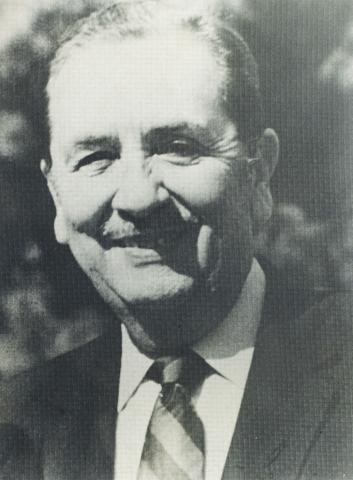
Nominee	Óscar Mendoza Azurdia
Party	MLN
Electoral vote	Uncontested
Vice President before election
Francisco Villagrán
Independent
Elected Vice President
Óscar Mendoza
MLN

Vice presidential elections were held in Guatemala on September 12, 1980.

== Background ==
On September 1, 1980, Vice President Francisco Villagrán Kramer resigned due to the scale of violence and authoritarianism perpetrated by President Romeo Lucas García. Eleven days later, the Congress of Guatemala elected former President Óscar Mendoza Azurdia as Vice President.
