= Odilia Palomo Paíz =

Guatemalan teacher and politician

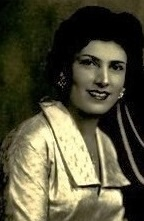
- Palomo Paíz in 1954

First Lady of Guatemala
- In role September 1, 1954 – July 26, 1957
- President: Carlos Castillo Armas
- Preceded by: Maria Cristina Vilanova
- Succeeded by: Julia Solís Gallardo

Personal details
- Born: Alicia Odilia Palomo Paíz; 20 November 1919 Guatemala City, Guatemala
- Died: 1985 (aged 65) Guatemala City, Guatemala
- Spouse: Carlos Castillo Armas (m. 1933; died 1957)

Alicia Odilia Palomo Paíz (20 November 1919 – 1985) was a Guatemalan teacher and politician. As the wife of President Carlos Castillo Armas, she was the First Lady of Guatemala from 1954 until the assassination of her husband in 1957.

She was born in Guatemala City, daughter of Herminio Palomo Mayorga and Josefina Paíz Amado. She married Carlos Castillo Armas in 1933.

Odilia Palomo Paíz became First Lady after her husband was invested as President of Guatemala. She was present during the visit of Vice President Richard Nixon and his wife Pat Nixon. On July 27, 1957, she was present during the murder of her husband Carlos Castillo Armas and was the only witness to the murder. After the funeral of her husband, she retired from public life. In 1976 President Fernando Romeo Lucas García decorated her with the Order Dolores Bedoya de Molina for her educational and social work. Palomo Paíz died in 1985.

Honorary titles
Preceded by Maria Cristina Vilanova	First Lady of Guatemala; 1954–1957	Succeeded by Julia Solís Gallardo
