= National Integrity Party =

National Integrity Party Partido de Integridad Nacional
- Abbreviation: PIN
- Founded: 1949
- Dissolved: 1950s
- Headquarters: Quetzaltenango
- Ideology: Pro-Árbenz; Personalismo
- Political position: Center-left
- National affiliation: PRG

The National Integrity Party (Partido de Integridad Nacional, PIN, or in some English-speaking countries, NIP) is a former political party in Guatemala. It was a "personalistic Arbenzista party" founded in Quezaltenango in 1949 with the goal of countering the opposition Independent Anti-Communist Party of the West, which was active in the same region. In 1952 the party merged with the other non-Communist parties supporting the Árbenz presidency (the National Renovation Party, the Revolutionary Action Party, the Socialist Party and the Popular Liberation Front) to form the Party of the Guatemalan Revolution.
