= Eloy Cavazos =

Mexican bullfighter

Eloy Cavazos (born 25 August 1949 in Ciudad Guadalupe, Nuevo León, Mexico) is a retired Mexican matador.

== History ==
He debuted in Plaza Mexico on 12 July 1966, with Gonzalo Iturbe and Leonardo Manzanos.

He took his alternativa in Plaza Monterrey, Nuevo León, Mexico, on 28 August 1966. His "godfather" was Antonio Velázquez. His witness was Manolo Martinez. His first bull was named "Cariñoso", from the ranch of San Miguel Mimiahuapam.

He took his confirmación in Plaza México, on 14 January 1968. His "godfather" was Alfredo Leal. His witness was Jaime Rangel. Bulls were from the ranch of Jesús Cabrera.

He took his confirmación in Madrid, Spain, on 22 May 1971. His "godfather" was Miguel Mateo "Miguelín". His witness was Gabriel de la Casa. Bulls were from the ranch of José Luis Osborne.

== Personal ==
He resides in Guadalupe, Nuevo León, a suburb of Monterrey, Nuevo Leon Mexico.

Eloy Cavazos and Jaime Bravo were in a tragic 1970 automobile accident, near Zacatecas, Mexico. Eloy survived. Jaime died, shortly thereafter. Their driver died in the accident. The accident occurred after a bullfight, in Zacatecas, where Jaime Bravo had just won that year's "Golden Sword" award. The sword disappeared in the accident. Eloy Cavazos's manager, Rafael Baez, had also been the late Matador Jaime Bravo's manager.

== Sources ==
- ESPN "Haunted By The Horns"
- Official Matador Jaime Bravo Website
- Portal Taurino.
