= Guatemalan Institute of Social Security =

Agency of Government of Guatemala

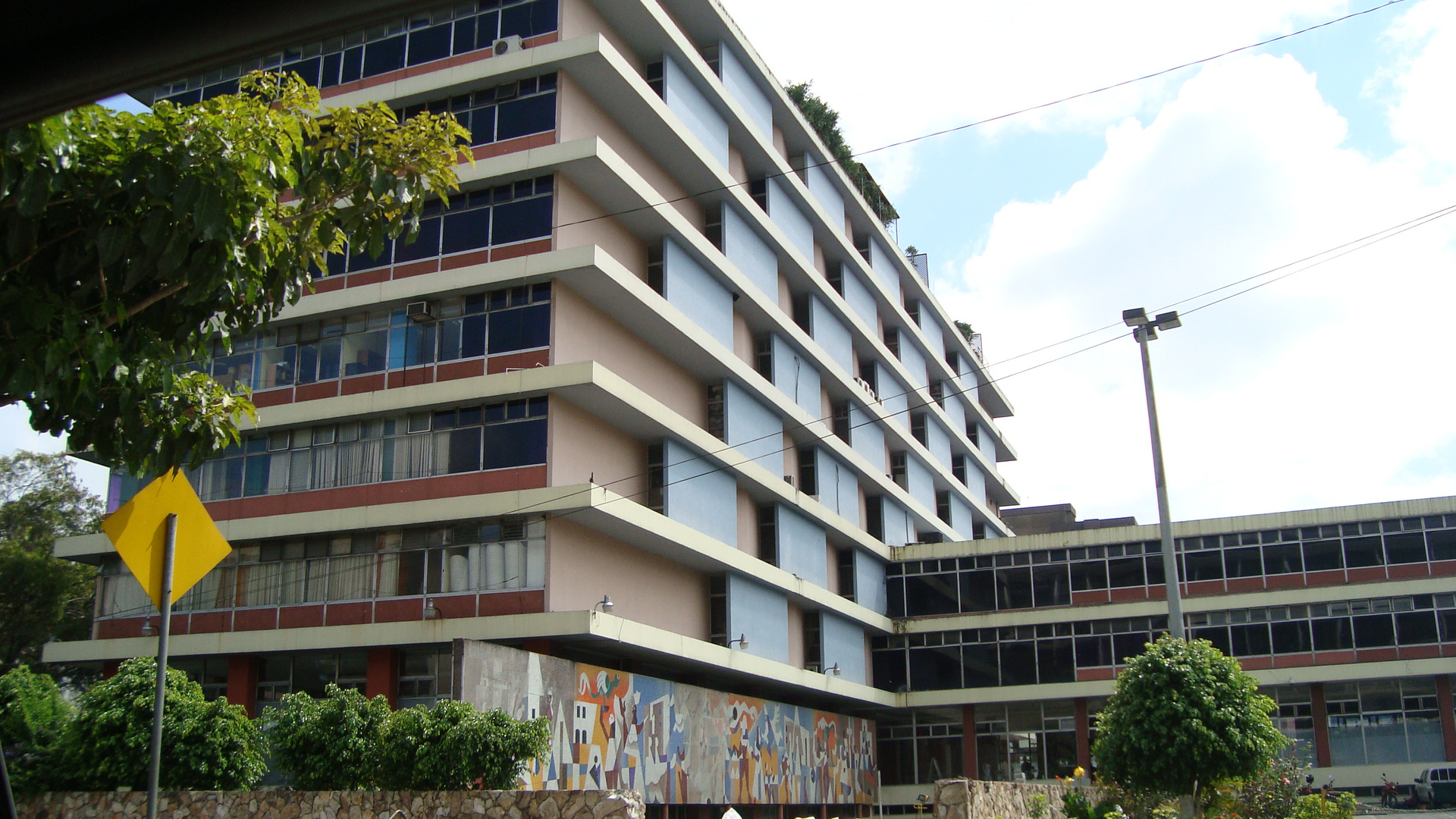
Guatemalan Institute of Social Security Building

The Guatemalan Institute of Social Security (abbreviated as IGSS in Spanish) is the branch of the Guatemalan Ministry of Work and Social Provision that provides Hospital and Clinical services; pensions and income protection benefits, and employment counseling for salaried employees in Guatemala.

The Institute was created in 1946 under the administration of President Juan Jose Arevalo after the Guatemalan legislature passed Congressional Act 256 that ushered in a series of labor reforms, including the creation of a pension system and clinical services for employees.

== History ==
=== Formation of the Institute ===
The Institute was a development of the labor reforms instituted by the government of Juan Jose Arevalo. In his efforts to mobilize the social protection infrastructure of Guatemala, the Arevalo administration brought two technocrats in the field of Social Security to help them design the Social Security system. Dr. Walter Dittel of Chile and Oscar Barahona Streber of Costa Rica. The technocrats made a socio-economic evaluation of the labor-capital landscape of the country. After a year of study, and a published report named Basis of the Social Security System in Guatemala, the Guatemalan legislature created a Social Security Act No. 256 and President Juan Jose Arevalo signed the Institute of Social security into law October 30, 1946.

=== Pension & Program Evolution ===
==== Work Injury Program ====
The work related incident pension and income protection for emergencies program was enacted in 1947 and rolled out at the national level between 1948 and 1949. The Program covers all workers insured by the Institute. The work injury program covered 50% of individual earnings and after the 1994 it started covering 66% of earnings. The minimum daily benefit payment is eight Quetzales and the monthly maximum is two thousand four hundred Quetzales.

==== Maternity Insurance ====
Instituted in 1953, the Guatemalan maternity insurance represented 50% of earnings and after 1968; 100% of earnings. After the 2005 reforms women would have to have contributed at least three months into their pension fund to receive the maternity benefits. To be a recipient of benefits, women have to contribute one percent of your gross earnings for the rest of your life.

==== Sickness & Maternity Act (1968) ====
In 1968 the Institute pension programs were reformed and combined into one program, including the Maternity Insurance program. The reforms included a 2% gross income, for life contribution by individual earners and then employers contribute 40% of the 2% gross income premium, and the government pays 20% of the 2% gross income premium. The initial program was limited to the department of Guatemala but the coverage was extended to 8 departments in 1979 and to the department of Escuintla in 1989. After the 1994 reforms, the coverage of the pensions listed under the program got extended to the entire country.

==== Old Age, Disability, & Survivors Program ====
The Old Age, Disability and Survivors pension structure was place into law in 1969 with the same department coverage as the coverage instituted in the Sickness & Maternity act of 1968. The program saw reforms for national coverage much earlier than the Sickness and Maternity program with legislation to expand it across the 22 departments in 1977. The fund for this program is funded by a 2% gross income contribution for life for salaried employees; 6% of declared earnings for self-employed individuals and 4% of the covered payroll. The state is mandated to pay 25% of the total of contributions to the program but it has never done so.

==== Constitutional Reform (1985) ====
The right to Social Security coverage became a constitutional right in Guatemala in Article 100 of the Guatemalan constitution after the constitutional convention of May 1985.

== Program Structure & Organization ==
=== Management & Administration ===
==== Executive Board ====
The Executive Board of the Guatemalan Institute for Social Security constitutes the highest administrative branch of the Social Security programs in Guatemala. It operates under the auspices of the Ministry of Work and Social Provision but it's an autonomous body which enables to take independent decisions. The President of the Institute is appointed by the executive branch; the first and second vice-presidents are appointed by the Central Bank and the State University respectively. The board also has three auxiliary chairs, one is appointed by the Academy of Doctors and Surgeons of Guatemala; another is appointed by the Business Associations; and the last one is appointed by the Labor sector.

=== Programs ===
==== Program Funding ====
The Social Security Fund that funds the majority of the cash benefits and the totality of the health services provided by the Guatemalan Institute of Social Security is financed in the following way:

- Salaried Employees: 5% of their monthly salary.
- Employers: 13% of the overall monthly payroll.

==== Benefits to Institute Affiliates ====
- Disability Insurance.
- Two thirds of the regular income cash benefits in case of temporary disability caused by emergency.
- Maternity leave insurance.
- Old age pension.
- Cash benefits to households with parents with disabilities.
- Sudden Death insurance for both the employer and the family of the deceased.

==== Health Services ====
- National Hospitals for Affiliates.
- Municipal Clinics for Affiliates.
- Internal Medicine Services for Affiliates.
- External Consultation paid for by the Institute.
- Psychiatric Services.
- Maternity Services.
- Laboratory Services.

== Bibliography ==
- Crabbe, Carolin (2005). Quarter century of pension reform in Latin America and the Caribbean : lessons learned and next steps. Washington, D.C.: Inter-American Development Bank. ISBN 1-59782-020-2.
- Congreso de la República (1946). Ley Orgánica del Instituto Guatemalteco de Seguridad Social; Decreto 295 del Congreso de La República. Guatemala: El Guatemalteco, Diario oficial de la República de Guatemala.
- Departamento de Comunicación Social y Relaciones Públicas (2005). Folleto de Información del Instituto Guatemalteco de Seguridad Social. Guatemala: Instituto Guatemalteco de Seguridad Social.
  - IGSS (2015). «Junta Directiva del Instituto». Sitio oficial del Instituto Guatemalteco de Seguridad Social. Guatemala.
- Social Security Administration Social Security Programs Throughout the World: The Americas, 2011 - Guatemala SSA - Office of Retirement and Disability Policy.
- Valverde, Fabio (2002). Evaluación actuarial del programa de pensiones del Instituto Guatemalteco de Seguridad Social. Guatemala: PNUD Guatemala Friedrich Ebert Stiftung. ISBN 99922-62-25-7.
