= 1959 Guatemalan parliamentary election =

Parliamentary elections were held in Guatemala on 16 December 1959, in order to elect half the seats in Congress. Voter turnout was just 44.91%.

== Results ==
Party	Votes	%	Seats	
Party	Votes	%	Won	Total
National Democratic Reconciliation Party	78,763	25.81	25	35
Revolutionary Party	71,682	23.49	–	7
National Democratic Movement	67,615	22.16	–	13
Guatemalan Christian Democracy	30,358	9.95	–	11
Revolutionary Unity Party	21,173	6.94	0	0
Authentic Revolutionary Party	14,158	4.64	0	0
National Renewal Party	7,677	2.52	0	0
Guatemalan Anticommunist Liberal Party	4,255	1.39	0	0
Institutional Reformist Party	3,499	1.15	0	0
Anticommunist Authentic Party	3,212	1.05	0	0
Party Nationalist Liberal Union	2,734	0.90	0	0
Total	305,126	100.00	33	66
Valid votes	305,126	89.88		
Invalid/blank votes	34,370	10.12		
Total votes	339,496	100.00		
Registered voters/turnout	756,000	44.91		
Source: Nohlen (votes)

== Bibliography ==
- Villagrán Kramer. Francisco. Biografía política de Guatemala: años de guerra y años de paz. FLACSO-Guatemala. 2004.
- Political handbook of the world 1959. New York. 1960.
