= 1961 Guatemalan parliamentary election =

Parliamentary elections were held in Guatemala on 3 December 1961, in order to elect half the seats in Congress. Following the election, the National Democratic Reconciliation Party-National Democratic Movement-Democratic Unity Party alliance held 50 of the 66 seats. Voter turnout was just 44.48%.

== Results ==
Party	Votes	%	Seats		
Party	Votes	%	Won	Total	+/–
PRDN–MDN–PUD	150,948	50.52	–	50	+2
Revolutionary Party	81,500	27.27	–	9	+2
National Liberation Movement	25,102	8.40	–	3	New
Guatemalan Christian Democracy	20,957	7.01	–	4	–7
Democratic Authentic Party	20,310	6.80	0	0	New
Total	298,817	100.00	33	66	0
Valid votes	298,817	82.53			
Invalid/blank votes	63,247	17.47			
Total votes	362,064	100.00			
Registered voters/turnout	814,000	44.48			
Source: Nohlen (votes)

== Bibliography ==
- Villagrán Kramer, Francisco. Biografía política de Guatemala: años de guerra y años de paz. FLACSO-Guatemala, 2004.
- Political handbook and Atlas of the world 1961. New York, 1962.
