= Guillermo Flores Avendaño =

President of Guatemala (1894–1992)

General of Division Guillermo Flores Avendaño
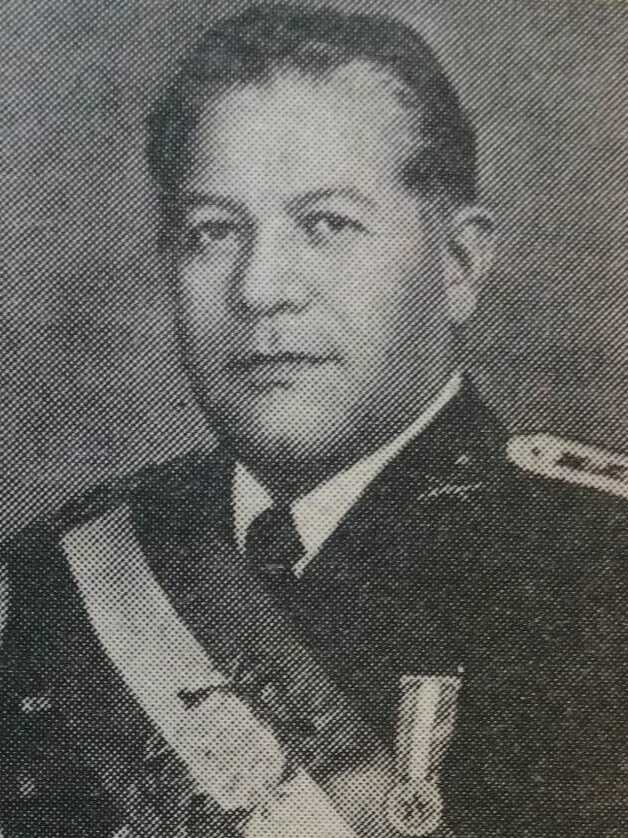
- Official portrait, c.1957–1958

President of the Republic of Guatemala
- In office October 26, 1957 – March 2, 1958
- Preceded by: Óscar Mendoza Azurdia
- Succeeded by: Miguel Ydígoras Fuentes

Personal details
- Born: 17 June 1894 San Andrés Itzapa, Chimaltenango Department, Guatemala
- Died: 26 May 1982 (aged 87) Guatemala City, Guatemala

Guillermo Flores Avendaño (17 June 1894 – 26 May 1982) was a Guatemalan military officer who served as president of Guatemala from October 1957 to March 1958. In March 1957, he was designated as second in the presidential line of succession by Congress (preceded by Luis Arturo González López). He assumed the role of provisional president in October of that same year after the results of the 1957 general elections were annulled after a coup on allegations of electoral fraud.

Flores Avendaño's tenure ended upon the inauguration of Miguel Ydígoras Fuentes who won the 1958 general elections. He was subsequently appointed as Minister of Defense under the Ydígoras Fuentes government.

Government offices
| Preceded by Óscar Mendoza (Military Junta) | President of Guatemala; 1957–1958 | Succeeded by Miguel Ydigoras |
