= Elisa Martínez Contreras =

Guatemalan diplomat (c. 1900–1985)

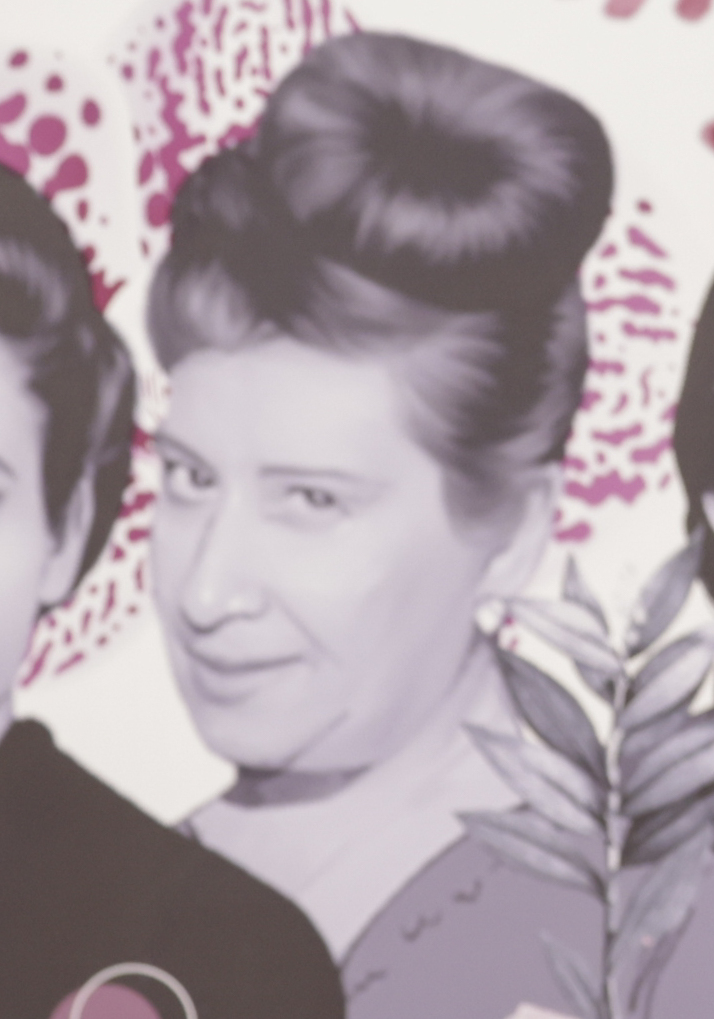

First Lady of Guatemala
- In role March 15, 1945 – March 15, 1951
- President: Juan José Arévalo
- Preceded by: Maria Cristina Vilanova
- Succeeded by: Maria Cristina Vilanova

Personal details
- Born: Elisa Martínez Contreras c. 1900 Buenos Aires, Argentina
- Died: April 15, 1985 Bariloche, Argentina
- Spouses: Juan José Arévalo (m. 1928; div. 1958)

Elisa Martínez Contreras (c. 1900 – April 15, 1985) was the first wife of Juan José Arévalo, and First Lady of Guatemala during Arévalo's presidency from 1945 to 1951. She was a teacher of primary education, and her social work supported children. While First Lady, she founded Guatemala's first soup kitchens and homes for homeless children.

== Biography ==
Elisa Martínez was born circa 1900, in Buenos Aires, Argentina, to Silverio Martínez and Brigida Contreras de Martínez. She was later said to be "some four years older" than her husband, Arévalo, who was born in 1904. He came to Argentina to study in 1927, and they married the following year. She had graduated as a Teacher of Primary Education in 1921, and proceeded to teach at a school in Buenos Aires for over twenty years straight.

When Arévalo returned to Guatemala in 1944, Martínez came with him, although at that time they were already separated. He ran in the presidential election and won, and took office as President of Guatemala on March 15, 1945, serving for a full six-year term; she then assumed the informal position of First Lady. She dedicated herself to pioneering work in Guatemala in the area of social services, and founded soup kitchens, homes for homeless children, nurseries, and other institutions. Elisa Martínez also began to take charge of day care centers and schools. According to reports, her successor as First Lady, Maria Cristina Vilanova, affirmed that Martínez asked her to take charge of Martínez's work during the inauguration of Arévalo's successor, Jacobo Arbenz, on March 15, 1951.

After she left Guatemala following the end of her husband's term of office, she returned to Buenos Aires and resumed teaching at the same school she had been employed at prior to her departure. Martínez died on April 15, 1985, in Bariloche, Argentina.

Honorary titles
| Preceded by Maria Cristina Vilanova | First Lady of Guatemala; 1945–1951 | Succeeded by Maria Cristina Vilanova |
