= María Cristina Vilanova =

Former First Lady of Guatemala

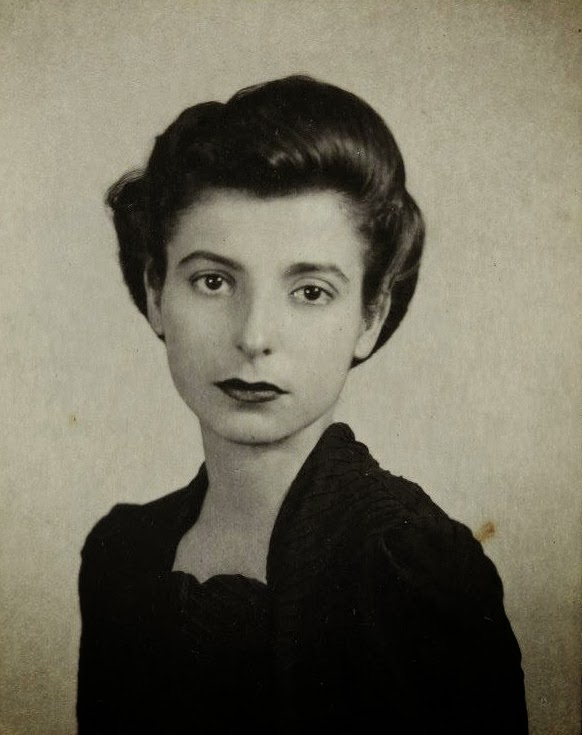

First Lady of Guatemala
- In role 15 March 1951 – 27 June 1954
- President: Jacobo Árbenz Guzmán
- Preceded by: Elisa Martínez Contreras
- Succeeded by: Odilia Palomo Paíz
- In role 20 October 1944 – 15 March 1945 Serving with Amalia Mancilla and María Leonor Saravia
- Leader: Jacobo Arbenz Guzmán
- Preceded by: Judith Ramírez Prado
- Succeeded by: Elisa Martínez Contreras

Personal details
- Born: 17 April 1915 San Salvador, El Salvador
- Died: 5 January 2009 (aged 93) San José, Costa Rica
- Spouse: Jacobo Árbenz Guzmán (m. 1939; died 1971)
- Children: 3 (including Arabella and Jacobo)
- Education: Notre Dame de Namur University

María Cristina Vilanova Castro de Árbenz (17 April 1915 – 5 January 2009) was the First Lady of Guatemala from 1951-1954, as wife of the Guatemalan President Jacobo Árbenz Guzmán.

== Biography ==
Vilanova de Arbenz was born in San Salvador in 1915, where her parents belonged to the society elite. She received a privileged education in elite European institutions. On a family trip to Guatemala she met the then-colonel Arbenz, and they eventually married there in 1937.

Vilanova was the first wife of a Guatemalan president to attend all of his public functions, and also the first one to perform socially active work. She has been often compared to Eva Perón given that she was also a feminist and had strong influence in the government during her husband's time in office. She was accused, along with her husband, of sympathies to Communism, and of exacting influence over him while in exile.

After her husband died in 1971 in Mexico, Vilanova moved to Costa Rica with her family, where she died in 2009.

== Exile ==
After resigning due to the 1954 Guatemalan coup, the Árbenz Vilanova family remained for 73 days at the Mexican embassy in Guatemala, which was crowded with almost 300 exiles. The Arbenz family then embarked into exile, taking them first to México, then to Canada, where they went to pick up daughter Arabella, and then on to Switzerland via the Netherlands. The Arbenz family were victims of an intense, CIA-orchestrated defamation campaign that lasted from 1954 to the triumph of the Cuban revolution in 1959.

After being spurned by Switzerland, the Árbenz family moved to Paris, and then to Prague. After only three months, they moved again, this time to Moscow, which proved to be a relief from the harsh treatment they received in Czechoslovakia. Arbenz tried several times to return to Latin America, and was finally allowed to move to Uruguay in 1957 (Arbenz joined the Communist Party in that year), living in Montevideo from 1957 to 1960. His communist ties, especially with José Manuel Fortuny, and forced passage through Czechoslovakia, the USSR and China, aroused suspicions.

=== Suicide of Arabella ===
In October 1965, Arabella Arbenz met Mexican bullfighter Jaime Bravo Arciga, who at that time was at his peak and was about to start a tour of South America; Arabella took advantage of this and fled with him to Colombia. While in Bogotá on 5 October 1965, Arabella tried to convince Bravo Arciga not to continue as a bullfighter, fearing for his life. After an afternoon where Bravo Arciga had been gored, he went to a luxurious gentlemen's club in the Colombian capital. Arabella phoned the place pleading to talk to Bravo Arciga, but he ignored her, as he was totally inebriated and in a foul mood after the goring. Dejected, she shot herself.

Bravo Arciga contacted Jorge Palmieri in Mexico via telephone, and asked him to take charge of funeral arrangements. Palmieri, who had great influence in the Mexican government at the time, obtained approval to bury Arabella in the Pantheon of the National Association of Actors of Mexico, since she had worked in an experimental film a few months earlier. Palmieri also received concessions allowing Arbenz, his wife, and children to travel to Mexico for the funeral.

Arabella's death was a huge blow to both the bullfighter and Jacobo Arbenz: both would die within five years of her death.

== Settlement with the Guatemalan government ==
In 2011, with a written agreement, the Guatemalan State recognized its international responsibility for "failing to comply with its obligation to guarantee, respect, and protect the human rights of the victims to a fair trial, to property, to equal protection before the law, and to judicial protection, which are protected in the American Convention on Human Rights and which were violated against former President Juan Jacobo Arbenz Guzman, his wife, María Cristina Vilanova, and his children, Juan Jacobo, María Leonora, and Arabella, all surnamed Arbenz Villanova."

== See also ==
- Operation PBSuccess
- Arabella Arbenz
- Jacobo Árbenz Guzmán

== Notes and references ==
=== Bibliography ===
- Cabrera Geserick, Marco (2007). Arbenz: Forbidden to Commit Suicide in Spring, A Biography. Tempe, Arizona: M.A. in History Thesis, Arizona State University.
- Carpio Alfaro, I. (1996). Memorias de Alfonso Bauer Paiz: historia no oficial de Guatemala (in Spanish). Guatemala: Rustication Ediciones.
- Cullather, Nick. Secret History: The CIA's Classified Account of its Operations in Guatemala, 1952-1954.
- Figueroa Ibarra, C. (2001). Paz Tejada, militar y revolucionario (in Spanish). Guatemala: Editorial Universitaria.
- Fortuny, José Manuel (2002). Memorias de José Manuel Fortuny (in Spanish). Guatemala: Oscar de León Palacios.
- García Ferreira, Roberto (2008). "The CIA and Jacobo Arbenz: The story of a disinformation campaign". Journal of Third World Studies. XXV (2).
- Gleijeses, Piero (1992). Shattered hope: the Guatemalan revolution and the United States, 1944-1954. United States: Princeton University Press. ISBN 9780691025568.
- Inter-American Commission of Human Rights (2011). "IACHR Satisfied with Friendly Settlement Agreement in Arbenz Case Involving Guatemala". oas.org.
- Montoya, Sofia Ann (n.d.). "A writer's journey inspired by a male muse". Ponder and dream.
- Palma, Claudia (26 June 2015). "Periquita y el suizo". Prensa Libre. Guatemala. Archived from the original on 30 June 2015.
- Mendelsohn, Alan; Pequeneza, Nadine (1999). A Coup: Made in America (Documentary Film). Barna-Alper productions and Connections Productions Resources, Inc.
- Palmieri, Jorge (2007). "Arabella Arbenz Vilanova". Blog de Jorge Palmieri (in Spanish). Archived from the original on 16 January 2015.
- Pellecer, Carlos Manuel (1997). Arbenz y Yo (in Spanish). Guatemala: Artemis-Edinter.
- Sierra Roldán, T. (1958). Diálogos con el coronel Monzón: historia viva de la revolución guatemalteca, 1944-1954 (in Spanish). Guatemala: San Antonio.
- Silva Girón, C.A. (1997). La Batalla de Gualán (in Spanish). Edición del Autor, Guatemala.
- Vilanova de Arbenz, María Cristina (2000). Mi Esposo, el presidente Arbenz. Guatemala: Editorial Universitaria. ISBN 9789992259610.

Honorary titles
Preceded by Elisa Martínez Contreras	First Lady of Guatemala; 1951–1954	Succeeded by Odilia Palomo Paíz
Preceded by María Judith Ramírez Prado	First Lady of Guatemala; 1944–1945	Succeeded by Elisa Martínez Contreras
Party political offices
Preceded by None	Leader of the Guatemalan Women's Alliance; 1951-1954	Succeeded by None
