= Guatemalan Christian Democracy =

Guatemalan Christian Democracy Democracia Cristiana Guatemalteca
- Founded: August 24, 1955
- Dissolved: August 21, 2008
- Ideology: Christian democracy Anti-communism
- Political position: Centre
- Regional affiliation: Christian Democrat Organization of America (observer)
- Colors: green

Guatemalan Christian Democracy (Spanish: Democracia Cristiana Guatemalteca, DCG) was a Christian democratic political party in Guatemala. The DCG was a member of Christian Democrat International.

== History ==
The party was established on 24 August 1955 by a group of Catholic businessmen. Although initially a right wing-party, it gradually turned leftwards as younger leaders emerged. It won five of the 66 seats in the December 1955 Congressional elections. In the 1957 general elections it nominated Miguel Asturias Quiñóne as its presidential candidate; Asturias finished third out of the three candidates with 11% of the vote. In the 1958 general elections it was part of a multi-party coalition that nominated José Luis Cruz Salazar for the presidency; he finished second, losing the deciding vote in Congress. In the Congressional elections the DCG ran in alliance with the Party of Anticommunist Unification and Republican Party, together winning 20 of the 66 seats. Following the partial elections the following year, the DCG held 11 of the 66 seats. However, it was reduced to four seats in the 1961 elections.

Following the 1963 coup, the DCG did not contest elections again until 1970. During the 1960s it became more radical, although it remained a centrist party. As a result of its growing radicalism, it became a target for right-wing terrorism and a scapegoat for the government during periods of urban violence. In the 1970 elections it nominated Jorge Lucas Caballeros as its presidential candidate. Also gaining the support of the illegal FURD, Lucas finished third in the three-candidate field with 22% of the vote. The party also failed to win a seat in Congress. It was part of the National Opposition Front alliance for the fraudulent 1974 elections. The alliance's presidential candidate José Efraín Ríos Montt finished second with 34% of the vote, whilst the alliance won 14 of the 60 seats in Congress. However, the legality of that election, in which Ríos Montt lost to Kjell Laugerud García, remains a matter of dispute. The 1978 general elections saw the DCG nominate Ricardo Peralta Méndez as its presidential candidate alongside the Authentic Revolutionary Party. Peralta finished third with 26% of the vote, whilst the DCG won seven seats in Congress. By the end of the 1970s it was one of only two legal left-wing parties remaining in Guatemala, and following a string of assassinations against party leaders, the party announced it was closing its offices across the country in June 1980.

Prior to the 1982 elections the party joined the National Opposition Union (UNO). The UNO nominated Alejandro Maldonado Aguirre as its presidential candidate. Maldonado finished third out of four candidates with 23% of the vote, whilst the UNO won nine of the 66 seats in Congress, of which the DCG took seven. Having won 20 of the 88 seats in the 1984 Constitutional Assembly elections, the 1985 elections saw the DGC come to power for the first time in its history. Its presidential candidate Vinicio Cerezo was elected in the second round of voting with 68% of the vote, whilst the party won 51 of the 100 seats in Congress. After holding power for five years, the party was defeated in the 1990 elections when its candidate Luis Alfonso Cabrera Hidalgo finished third in the presidential race, whilst the party was reduced to 27 seats in an expanded Congress.

Following the 1993 constitutional crisis, early parliamentary elections were held in 1994, in which the DCG won 13 of the 80 seats. In the general elections the following year it was reduced to only three seats, although presidential candidate Fernando Andrade Díaz-Duran finished third with 13% of the vote. The party did not have a presidential candidate in the 1999 elections and won only two seats in Congress. The 2003 elections saw the party lose Congressional representation, whilst its presidential candidate Jacobo Arbenz Villanova received only 1.6% of the vote. The DCG also failed to win a seat in the 2007 elections, with presidential candidate Vinicio Cerezo Blandón receiving only 0.5% of the vote.

Having failed to secure the minimum of 5% of the popular vote or one seat in Congress, the DCG forfeited its registration as a party.
