= Jacobo Árbenz Vilanova =

Guatemalan politician

Jacobo Árbenz
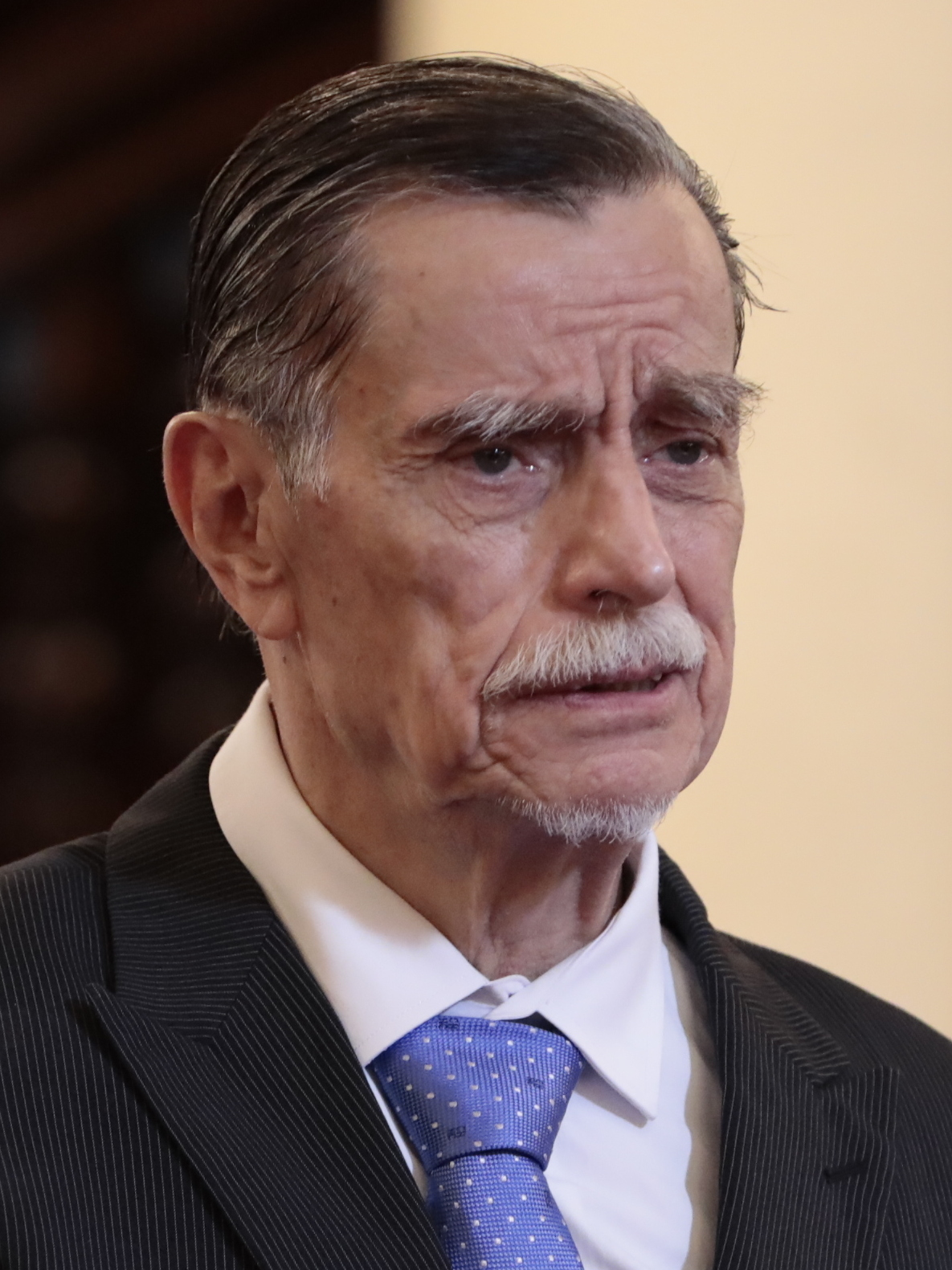
- Árbenz Vilanova in 2024
- Born: Jacobo Árbenz Vilanova; November 13, 1946; Guatemala City, Guatemala
- Occupation: politician
- Parent(s): Jacobo Árbenz; Maria Cristina Vilanova

Jacobo Árbenz Vilanova (born 13 November 1946) is a politician in Guatemala. He is the son of former progressive Guatemalan President Jacobo Árbenz Guzmán, who was overthrown in a CIA sponsored coup d'état in 1954. Arbenz Vilanova fled the country following the ouster of his father's government and spent almost 50 years in exile — in Mexico, France, Switzerland, Czechoslovakia, the Soviet Union, Uruguay, Cuba and El Salvador, but mostly in Costa Rica – before deciding to return during the administration of Alfonso Portillo.

After unsuccessfully trying to form his own political party to fight the 2003 presidential election, he was accepted as the candidate of the Christian Democracy party (DCG) after two earlier DCG presidential candidates withdrew. The DCG ticket, comprising Arbenz Vilanova and vice presidential running mate Mario Rolando Castro de León, was placed eighth, with 1.6% of the total vote.

Árbenz Vilanova graduated in business management in El Salvador and, prior to returning from exile and entering politics, had owned and run a coffee plantation, a cattle ranch, and a company dedicated to non-traditional exports. He is married with seven children and, in addition to his native Spanish, speaks French, Czech, Russian and English.
