= Francisco Villagrán Kramer =

Guatemalan attorney and social democrat

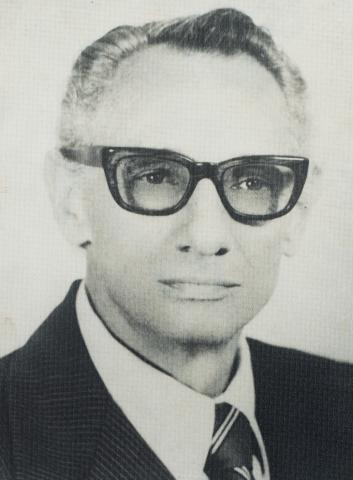
- Official portrait

Vice President of Guatemala
- In office 1 July 1978 – 1 September 1980
- President: Fernando Romeo Lucas García
- Preceded by: Mario Sandoval Alarcón
- Succeeded by: Óscar Mendoza Azurdia

Personal details
- Born: April 5, 1927 Guatemala City, Guatemala
- Died: July 12, 2011 (aged 84)
- Education: Universidad de San Carlos de Guatemala

Francisco Villagrán Kramer (5 April 1927 – 12 July 2011) was a Guatemalan attorney and social democrat who served as vice president in the government of General Romeo Lucas García, beginning in 1978. He resigned from office on 1 September 1980, before his term ended, citing differences with the Lucas administration and disapproval of Guatemala's worsening human rights situation. He then went into voluntary exile in the United States, taking a position in the Legal Department of the Inter-American Development Bank.

Villagrán later served on the Inter-American Juridical Committee of the Organization of American States (OAS) and the United Nations' International Law Commission. In 1994, he was elected to the Guatemalan Congress, where he was president of the Committee on Human Rights.

In 1997, he was nominated for a seat on the OAS's Inter-American Commission on Human Rights. The nomination raised strong criticism based on the allegation that death squads had been active in Guatemala during his time as vice president.

Villagrán authored over two dozen books and dozens of articles on international law and Guatemalan history and politics. In Biografía Política de Guatemala, he described his involvement with the Lucas administration as a failed attempt to exert a moderating influence on an authoritarian regime.

Preceded by Mario Sandoval	Vice President of Guatemala; 1978–1980	Succeeded by Óscar Mendoza
