= 1958 Guatemalan general election =

- 19 January 1958
- Presidential election
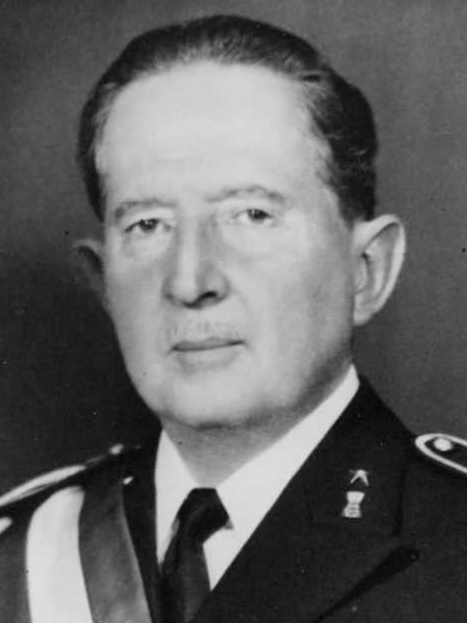

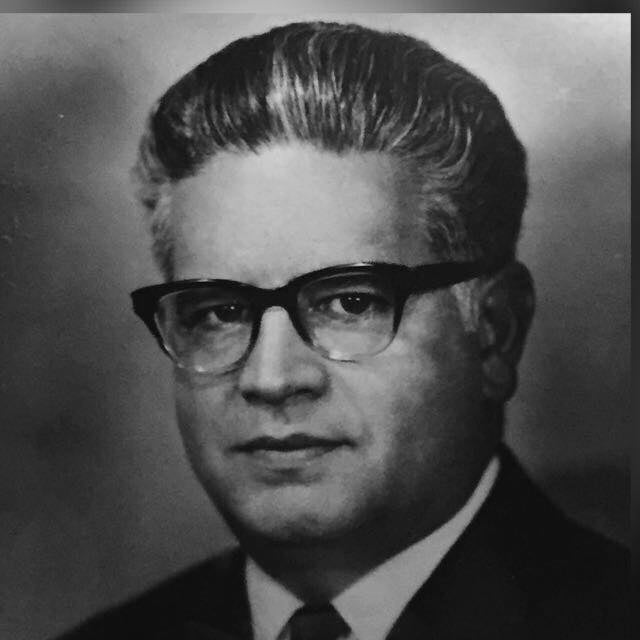
Nominee	Miguel Ydígoras	José Luis Cruz	Mario Méndez
Party	PRDN	MDN	Revolutionary
Electoral vote	40	18
Popular vote	190,972	138,488	132,824
Percentage	40.80%	29.58%	28.37%
President before election
Guillermo Flores Avendaño
MLN
President-elect
Miguel Ydígoras Fuentes
PRDN

General elections were held in Guatemala on 19 January 1958 after the 1957 elections were nullified. After no candidate received 50% or more of the national vote, Miguel Ydígoras Fuentes was elected President by Congress on 12 February 1958, whilst an alliance of the National Democratic Reconciliation Party, Nationalist Democratic Party, the Nationalist Liberal Party, the Democratic National Association and the National Anti-Communist Front won 40 of the 66 seats in Congress.

== Results ==
=== President ===
Candidate	Party	Popular vote		Congress vote	
Candidate	Party	Votes	%	Votes	%
Miguel Ydígoras Fuentes	PRDN–PDN–PLN–PLAG–ANDE–FAN	190,972	40.80	40	68.97
José Luis Cruz Salazar	MDN–PUA–PL–PR–DCG	138,488	29.58	18	31.03
Mario Méndez Montenegro	Revolutionary Party	132,824	28.37		
José Enrique Ardón Fernández	Nationalist Liberal Union Party	5,834	1.25		
Total		468,118	100.00	58	100.00
Valid votes		468,118	95.09	58	89.23
Invalid/blank votes		24,156	4.91	7	10.77
Total votes		492,274	100.00	65	100.00
Registered voters/turnout		736,400	66.85	66	98.48
Source: Nohlen, New York Times

=== Congress ===
Party	Votes	%	Seats
National Democratic Reconciliation Party	127,195	36.99	40
Anti-Communist Unification Party	112,105	32.60	20
Revolutionary Party	88,418	25.71	6
Liberal Party	3,785	1.10	0
National Democratic Movement	3,674	1.07	0
Party Nationalist Liberal Union	2,955	0.86	0
Anticommunist Authentic Party	2,451	0.71	0
Guatemalan Anticommunist Liberal Party	1,918	0.56	0
Democratic Workers’ Party	1,382	0.40	0
Total	343,883	100.00	66
Source: Nohlen (votes)

== Bibliography ==
- Villagrán Kramer, Francisco. Biografía política de Guatemala: años de guerra y años de paz. FLACSO-Guatemala, 2004.
- Political handbook of the world 1958. New York, 1959.
- Elections in the Americas A Data Handbook Volume 1. North America, Central America, and the Caribbean. Edited by Dieter Nohlen. 2005.
