= People's Party (Guatemala) =

The People's Party (Spanish: Partido del Pueblo) was a political party in Guatemala. The party was led by Jorge García Granados, and functioned as his personal political vehicle. García had been a leader in the 1944 October Revolution. The party opposed the government of Jacobo Arbenz Guzmán. It disappeared after the 1954 coup.
