= Arabella Árbenz =

Guatemalan fashion model and actress

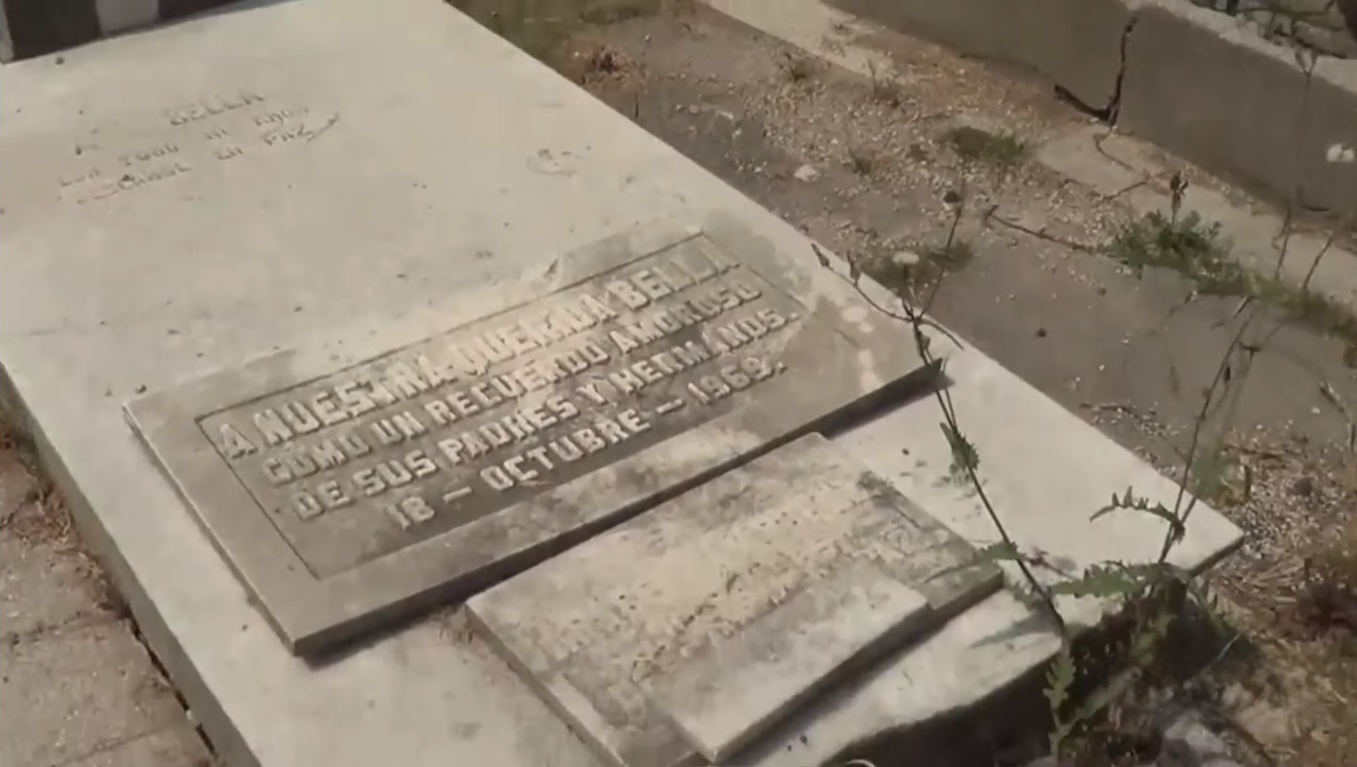
- Grave of Árbenz at Panteón Jardín
- Born: Arabella Árbenz Vilanova; January 15, 1940; San Salvador, El Salvador
- Died: October 5, 1965 (aged 25); Bogotá, Colombia
- Cause of death: Suicide
- Occupations: Fashion model, Actress
- Parent(s): Jacobo Árbenz; Maria Cristina Villanova de Árbenz

Arabella Árbenz Vilanova (January 15, 1940 – October 5, 1965) was a Guatemalan fashion model and actress, and the daughter of Guatemalan President Jacobo Árbenz. After being sent to Canada to study in a boarding school, she joined her family in exile after her father was ousted from power in June 1954. She suffered along with her family the difficult conditions of their exile, until she decided to remain in Paris to become a fashion model. After an intense love life and drug abuse, she killed herself in front of her last lover, Mexican bullfighter Jaime Bravo, in Colombia.

== Biography ==
Árbenz Vilanova was born in San Salvador, daughter of Captain Jacobo Árbenz and María Cristina Vilanova. Her father was active politically and was involved in the ousting of president general Jorge Ubico in 1944; he then became the Guatemalan Minister of Defense in 1945, an office that he would hold until he became Guatemalan President in 1951.

As the beautiful daughter of a president, Árbenz Vilanova, grew up in entitled surroundings. The well known Guatemalan journalist Jorge Palmieri -who later would become her lover- described her as follows:

President Árbenz asked me one day to take his three children to his mother's house, Octavia Guzmán de Árbenz. Of course, being a youngster, I replied that I would be readily available to do so. But it took me longer than expected to get to the car, which was parked in front of the Official Residency and where the three children we already inside. Arabella kept sounding the claxon and when I got there, she said: If you are not going to take us to our Grandma's immediately, I am going to tell Daddy to get us a new chauffeur right away! I took offense and replied angrily: Look, you (expletive) spoiled little brat, I am not a chauffeur! But this being the presidential family, I drove them to their grandmother's house. That very afternoon, I was called to the presidential office and when I arrived there, Arbenz told me seriously: Little Arabella complained to me that you insulted her this morning!. I frankly replied: I called her a (expletive) little brat because she spoke to me as if I were her chauffeur. Árbenz was not used to smiling, but this time he smiled and said: You are right, boy! Little Arabella is a (expletive) little brat, but do not forget that she is the beloved daughter of the President of the Republic and do not call her that ever again.

— Jorge Palmieri]l

== Family humiliation and exile ==
After resigning due to the coup organized by the United Fruit Company and the United States Department of State, the Árbenz family remained for 73 days at the Mexican embassy in Guatemala, which was crowded with almost 300 exiles. When they were finally allowed to leave the country, Jacobo Arbenz was publicly humiliated at the airport because the liberationist authorities made the former president strip before the cameras, claiming that he was carrying jewelry he had bought for his wife at Tiffany's in New York City, using funds from the presidency; no jewelry was found during the hour-long interrogation. The Arbenz family embarked into exile, going first to Mexico, then to Canada, where they went to pick up Arabella who was attending school there, and then on to Switzerland via the Netherlands. In Switzerland, the Swiss authorities requested that Arbenz renounce his Guatemalan nationality, so as to prevent him from conducting resistance activities. The ousted president refused this request, as he felt that such a gesture would have marked the end of his political career. Furthermore, Arbenz could not seek political asylum, because Switzerland had not yet ratified the 1951 agreement of the newly created United Nations Refugees Convention, which was designed to protect people fleeing from communist regimes in Eastern Europe. Árbenz and his family were instead the victims of a CIA-orchestrated defamation campaign that lasted from 1954 to 1960, which only abated when the Cuban revolution triumphed in 1959, and that included a close friend of Árbenz, who turned out to be a double agent working for the CIA: Carlos Manuel Pellecer.

=== Seeking shelter ===
After being rejected for entry by Switzerland, the Árbenz family moved to Paris, France and then to Prague, Czechoslovakia. Czechoslovak officials were uncomfortable with Arbenz, unsure if he would demand the government compensate him for shipments of Second World War-era arms that they had sold Guatemala in 1954. After only three months, the family moved again, this time to Moscow, which proved a relief from the harsh treatment they encountered in Czechoslovakia. Arbenz tried to return to Latin America several times, finally being allowed to move to Uruguay in 1957 (Arbenz joined the Communist Party in that year). The Arbenz family lived in Montevideo from 1957 to 1960. The family's experience turned out to be lukewarm: the former president's communist ties, especially with José Manuel Fortuny, and forced passage through Czechoslovakia, the USSR and China, aroused suspicions. When the National Party took power in Uruguay in late 1958, the situation worsened for Arbenz there. In 1960, after the Cuban Revolution, Fidel Castro invited Árbenz to Cuba, a suggestion that Árbenz Guzmán readily agreed to.

== Independent life ==
When the Arbenz family arrived in Moscow, Soviet Union they sent Arabella to a boarding school, where she ended up leading a rebellion of Latin American students against the rigid standards of the institution. For this she was severely chastised by her parents, who were ashamed of her rebellious behavior. Arbenz Vilanova was an intelligent, beautiful woman who fluently spoke Spanish, English, Italian, French and Russian, who also displayed a strong and difficult personality. She decided not to accompany her father to live in exile in Cuba after he was invited by Fidel Castro, preferring to stay in Paris studying acting and working as a model. Her life in exile had been hard and bitter, having witnessed her father's descent into alcoholism, her mother's infidelity during her father's alcoholic stupors, and even bouts of physical abuse from a so-called friend of her father. She began using LSD and marijuana and had intense relationships with both men and women. After leaving Paris for Mexico, she had torrid romances with Guatemalan journalist Jorge Palmieri and with the future owner of Televisa, Emilio Azcárraga Milmo, who helped her begin her acting career. Arbenz Vilanova would go on to appear in an experimental film called Un alma pura (A pure soul).

== Death ==
Shortly after Arbenz Vilanova began using LSD, her drug abuse began affecting her behavior. Azcarraga disowned her, getting the government to expel her from Mexico in October 1965. Arabella then met the Mexican bullfighter Jaime Bravo Arciga, who at that time was at his peak as a bullfighter about to start a tour of South America. Arabella took advantage of this and fled with him to Colombia. While in Bogotá on October 5, 1965, Arabella tried to convince Bravo Arciga not to continue bullfighting, fearing for his life. After an afternoon where Bravo Arciga had been gored, he went to a luxurious gentlemen's club in the Colombian capital. Arabella phoned the place pleading to talk to Bravo Arciga, but he ignored her, as he was totally inebriated and in a foul mood after the goring. She finally came to the club, where she shot herself.

Bravo Arciga contacted Jorge Palmieri in Mexico by phone, and asked him to take charge of funeral arrangements for Arabella. Palmieri, who had strong influence in the Mexican government at the time, received permission to bury Arabella in the Pantheon of the National Association of Actors of Mexico, since she had worked in an experimental film a few months earlier. Palmieri also obtained permission to allow Arbenz and his family to travel to Mexico for the funeral.

Arabella's death was a huge blow to both the bullfighter and Jacobo Arbenz: both would die within five years of her death.

== Settlement with the Guatemalan Government ==
In 2011, with a written agreement, the Guatemalan State recognized its international responsibility for "failing to comply with its obligation to guarantee, respect, and protect the human rights of the victims to a fair trial, to property, to equal protection before the law, and to judicial protection, which are protected in the American Convention on Human Rights and which were violated against former President Juan Jacobo Arbenz Guzman, his wife, María Cristina Vilanova, and his children, Juan Jacobo, María Leonora, and Arabella, all surnamed Arbenz Villanova."

== Bibliography ==
- Garcia Ferreira, Roberto (2008). "The CIA and Jacobo Arbenz: The story of a disinformation campaign". Journal of Third World Studies. XXV (2).
- Gleijeses, Piero (1992). Shattered hope: the Guatemalan revolution and the United States, 1944–1954. United States: Princeton University Press. ISBN 9780691025568.
- Inter-American Commission of Human Rights (2011). "IACHR Satisfied with Friendly Settlement Agreement in Arbenz Case Involving Guatemala". oas.org.
- Koeppel, Dan (2008). Banana: The Fate of the Fruit That Changed the World. New York: Hudson Street Press.
- Montoya, Sofia Ann (9 April 2014). "A writer's journey inspired by a male muse". Ponder and dream.
- Palmieri, Jorge (May 2007). "Arabella Arbenz Vilanova". Blog de Jorge Palmieri (in Spanish). Guatemala. Archived from the original on 16 January 2015.
