= Jaime Bravo =

Matador and film actor (1932–1970)

- Born: September 8, 1932; Mexico City, Mexico
- Died: February 2, 1970 (aged 37); Zacatecas, Mexico
- Occupation(s): Matador, film actor
- Spouse(s): Francesca De Scaffa (1957-1957) annulled Ann Robinson (1957–1967) (divorced) 2 children Monica Lind (1967-1970) (his death) (1 child)
- Children: 3

Jaime Bravo Arciga (September 8, 1932 – February 2, 1970) was a Mexican matador during the 1950s and 1960s. Bravo was known for his death-defying style and numerous relationships with various women and Hollywood starlets.

== Early life ==
Bravo was born in the infamous Tepito barrio of México City, to Spanish parents. His way out was as a trapecista (trapeze artist) for a well-known Mexican circus. In his early 20s, he stowed away on a ship to Cuba, and then on another to Spain, where he learned his art. Bravo took his Alternativa in Valencia, and was later confirmed in Madrid.

== Career ==
=== Hollywood films ===
During the 1950s and 1960s, Mexico was full of English/Spanish crossover movie stars, including Antonio Aguilar, making Western films and usually singing in them like a Latin version of Elvis; the scripts were groomed to fit their more high-profile careers. Gaston Santos, the rejoneador, was also making movies.

Bravo played a small part in Un Toro Me Llama (1968) (English title Call of a Bull). The film starred Emilio Fernández and a cast of Americans, with the main theme being about a woman wanting to be a bullfighter. Bravo took the role mostly to see how he looked on the screen.

Another film, which was scandalous for the time, Love Has Many Faces (1965) featured Bravo as a matador. It starred Lana Turner, Cliff Robertson, Hugh O'Brian, Ruth Roman, and Stefanie Powers. Although Bravo spoke English very well, the film's producers used another actor's voice to dub over Bravo's thick accent.

He is also the topic of a 1962 episode of the American TV series The Story of ... called "The Story of a Matador", directed by Art Swerdloff and produced by David Wolper. Bravo demonstrated what a bullfighter went through as he rose to stardom in the rings. Swerdloff commented about it: "It is one of my favourite half-hour films. One of the best I've done."

Away from the bullrings, Bravo already had the reputation of a big-screen movie idol, if only because of his often-scandalous behaviour. Numerous affairs with Hollywood's biggest and most beautiful names lead to an infamous reputation then and now. He is still remembered for frequently having a number of his girlfriends seated throughout the crowd at some of his bullfights, unbeknownst to one another.

== Personal life ==
=== Utilizing scandal ===
Bravo used scandal to garner headlines. During an August 1968 corrida, playing to the tourist crowds of Tijuana, Bravo "requested the animal be spared. This, in turn, was denied, and the torero [Bravo] who refused to kill the bull was escorted to the local jail and fined". Bravo received headlines for his defiance. Only one month earlier, at a July 1968 corrida, Bravo had used a similar press-grabbing tactic, when he was not performing his best, and another matador's superior performance was poised to gain the next day's headlines. Before that corrida ended, Bravo cursed at the bullring judge, just enough to infuriate the judge so that Bravo was immediately arrested and jailed. Cameras captured countless photos of Bravo being cuffed, escorted from the bullring, and locked in a jail cell. The next day, the newspapers' headlines boldly declared that Jaime Bravo had been jailed.

Gossip around Bravo was further promulgated by such actions as his behavior during a 1957 Tijuana bullfight, during which he tossed flowers to Ava Gardner from the ring. She was at the corrida with actor Gilbert Roland.

One of the biggest scandals concerning Bravo's misadventures was related to Arabella Arbenz, daughter of Guatemala's former president Jacobo Arbenz. A fashion model and actress, Arbenz carried on a relationship with Bravo. She shot herself on October 5, 1965, after being spurned by Bravo after a bad bullfight.

=== Marriages ===
Bravo was married three times. He first married actress Francesca De Scaffa in 1957. The marriage was a fiasco and was annulled.

In 1957, Bravo married actress Ann Robinson, by whom he had his first two sons, Jaime and Estefan. In 1967, two years after appearing in a 1965 Las Vegas promotional bullfight, he married a Las Vegas showgirl named Monica Lind (from Les Folies Bergère), by whom he had his last son, named Aleco Jaime Bravo.

== Final years and death ==
By the late 1960s, Bravo was a renowned bullfighter, known still for his charisma and good looks. He began looking to the film world for a career that might suit him once he retired from the bulls. Several production companies were keen to give him a chance in film. His profile remained such that he could still draw crowds from within the Mexican interior and the US, especially with a large following in border towns such as Tijuana, Nogales, Ciudad Juárez, and Matamoros, and states such as California, Arizona, and Texas.

On February 2, 1970, Bravo and his driver were killed in a car accident near Zacatecas, Mexico. Eloy Cavazos, a fellow matador, who was one of Bravo's protégés, was also in the car, but survived.

== Sources ==
- Matador Jaime Bravo
- Pulp Movies
- Jaime Bravo at IMDb
- "Toros" Magazines
- Programs - International Bullfight
- "Matadors of Mexico" (1961), Ann D. Miller
- Various newspapers from the 1960s
