= National Democratic Reconciliation Party =

Disbanded moderate-conservative party in Guatemala

The National Democratic Reconciliation Party (Spanish: Partido Reconciliacion Democratica Nacional, PRDN or REDENCION) was a moderate conservative party in Guatemala.

== History ==
The PRDN was founded in March 1950 by General Miguel Ydígoras Fuentes. Ydígoras finished as the runner-up in the November 1950 presidential elections with 19% of the vote. He finished as runner-up again in the 1957 elections, but the results were annulled due to fraud. In the fresh elections the following year, Ydígoras received the largest vote share (41%) and was confirmed as president by a vote in Congress, in which the PRDN-led coalition had won a majority of seats. The PRDN retained its Congressional majority in the 1959 and 1961 elections.

Ydígoras was removed from office by a 1963 coup, after which the party was disbanded.
