= Jorge García Granados =

Guatemalan diplomat (1900–1961)

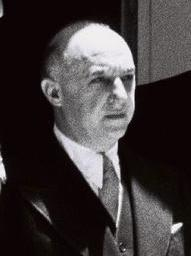
Granados in 1955

Jorge García Granados (21 April 1900 – 3 May 1961) was a politician and diplomat from Guatemala, a grandson of Miguel García Granados, the leader and philosopher of the liberal revolution in the 19th century. He ran as a presidential candidate in 1950.

Granados was the ambassador of his country to the United Nations and a member of the United Nations Special Committee on Palestine (UNSCOP). Granados cast the very first vote for the creation of the state of Israel and Guatemala became the first Latin American country to recognize Israel after the proclamation of the state.

At the time of the vote on the United Nations Partition Plan for Palestine, Granados organized a lobby of Central and South American countries to support the partition plan. In 1956, Guatemala became the first country to open an embassy in Jerusalem, with Granados appointed as the first ambassador. The Israeli cities of Jerusalem and Ramat-Gan named streets to honor Granados.

Garcia Granados wrote about his experience serving on the UNSCOP in his book, The Birth of Israel: The Drama as I Saw It. In the book, Granados describes his youth, his time in political exile from Guatemala during the reign of military dictatorships, the achievements of the Zionist movement during the British mandate on Palestine, and the events surrounding the creation of Israel.
