= Óscar Mendoza Azurdia =

Guatemalan President (1917–1995)

General of Division Óscar Mendoza Azurdia
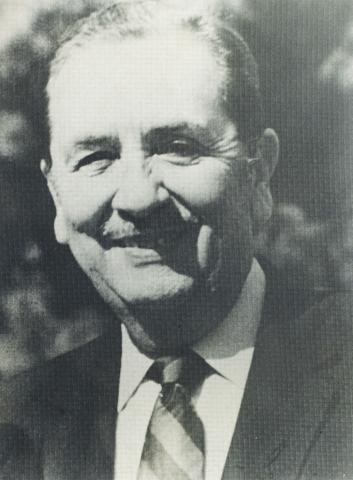
- Azurdia in the 1980s

Vice President of Guatemala
- In office 12 September 1980 – 23 March 1982
- President: Fernando Romeo Lucas García
- Preceded by: Francisco Villagrán Kramer
- Succeeded by: Rodolfo Lobos Zamora

President of the Republic of Guatemala
- In office 24 October 1957 – 26 October 1957
- Preceded by: Luis Gonzáles
- Succeeded by: Guillermo Flores Avendaño

Personal details
- Born: 4 June 1917 Guatemala City, Guatemala
- Died: 9 January 1995 (aged 77)

Colonel Óscar Alberto Mendoza Azurdia (4 June 1917 – 9 January 1995) was the chairman of the military junta in Guatemala from 24 October 1957 to 26 October 1957. He was later elected as Vice President on 12 September 1980 after the resignation of Francisco Villagrán. He served until the military coup of Efraín Ríos Montt in March 1982.

Military Government Junta (1957)

- Colonel Óscar Mendoza Azurdia
- Colonel Roberto Salazar
- Colonel Gonzalo Yurrita Nova

Political offices
Preceded by Luis Arturo González	President of Guatemala; 1957 (Military Junta)	Succeeded by Guillermo Flores
Preceded by Francisco Villagrán	Vice President of Guatemala; 1980–1982	Succeeded by Vacant
