= Liberal Party of Guatemala =

Liberal Party of Guatemala Partido Liberal de Guatemala
- Secretary-General: Andrés Ayau García
- Founded: 2015
- Dissolved: February 15, 2021
- Ideology: Liberalism
- Colors: Blue, skyblue and yellow
- Seats in Congress: 0 / 158

Website
- Official site

Liberal Party of Guatemala (Previously: Coalition by the Change) was a political party in Guatemala.

== History ==
Previously the political party was denominated Coalition by the Change. It was founded under that name in 2009. With that name, the political party could not participate in the Guatemalan general elections in 2011 or in 2015. After the 2015 General Elections, the political party changed its name to Partido Liberal de Guatemala and it was registered with its new name by the Supreme Electoral Tribunal in 2017. Its leader was Andrés Ayau.

In the 2019 Guatemalan General Elections, the Partido Liberal de Guatemala tried to nominate Ricardo Méndez Ruíz for the presidency, but due to internal conflicts, the political party was left out of the 2019 Guatemalan General Elections.

Finally, the Liberal Party of Guatemala was canceled on February 15, 2021.

== Presidential elections ==
Election date	Party candidate	Number of votes	Percentage of votes	Number of votes	Percentage of votes	Status
Election date	Party candidate	First round		Second round		Status
2019	Ricardo Méndez Ruiz	—	—	—	—	Did not participate
