= Democratic Union (Guatemala) =

Political party in Guatemala

The Democratic Union (Spanish: Unión Democrática) was a center-right political party in Guatemala. At the 2003 Guatemalan general election, the party won 2 out of 158 seats. In the 2007 Guatemalan general election, the party won only one seat in the 2008–2012 Congress. In the presidential election of the same day, its candidate Manuel Conde Orellana won 0.76% of the popular vote.
