= Party of the Guatemalan Revolution =

Party of the Guatemalan Revolution Partido de la Revolución Guatemalteca
- Abbreviation: PRG
- Leader: Jacobo Árbenz
- Founded: June 1952
- Dissolved: 1954
- Ideology: Pro-revolution; Liberal democracy Land reform Agrarianism; Labourism; Factions: Social democracy Democratic socialism Reformism; Progressivism
- Political position: Center-left
- National affiliation: FPL; PRN; PAR; PS; PIN

The Party of the Guatemalan Revolution (Partido de la Revolución Guatemalteca, PRG) was formed in June 1952 during the Guatemalan Revolution to unite the non-Communist parties which were supporting the administration of Jacobo Árbenz. These included the Popular Liberation Front, the National Renovation Party, the Revolutionary Action Party, and the Socialist Party. The Communist Guatemalan Party of Labour (PGT) was opposed to the formation of the PRG, fearing that it would undermine their influence in the government. The PAR and the PRN later withdrew. Although the PRG continued in existence until the overthrow of the President Árbenz, it had failed to achieve its original purpose of opposing Communist efforts to gain a predominant voice in the Árbenz government. It was disbanded after the coup d'état of 1954.
