= Roberto Azurdia =

Guatemalan writer and diplomat

Roberto René Azurdia Paiz
- Born: 1926 (age 99–100); Guatemala
- Education: Escuela Médico Militar
- Medical career
- Profession: Physician, writer, ambassador
- Sub-specialties: Surgery

Roberto René Azurdia Paiz (born 1926) is a Guatemalan writer, diplomat and physician.

== Career ==
Azurdia was appointed minister of public health by the president of Guatemala, in 1961 and served in that function until he was nominated ambassador to Italy in 1963 during the presidencies of Enrique Peralta Azurdia and Julio César Méndez.

=== Ambassador in Italy ===
While acting as Ambassador to Italy, he served as representative from Guatemala to the Food and Agriculture Organization of the United Nations.
