= 1957 Guatemalan general election =

- 20 October 1957
- Presidential election
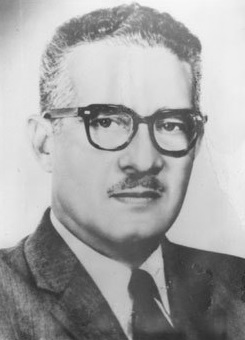

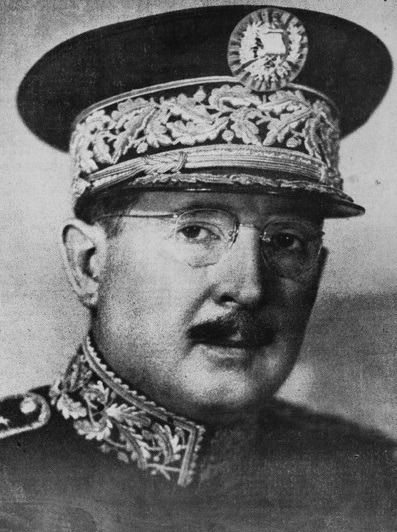
Nominee	Miguel Ortiz	Miguel Ydígoras	Miguel Asturias Quiñónez
Party	MLN	PRDN	DCG
Popular vote	241,335	173,365	52,600
Percentage	51.64%	37.10%	11.26%
President before election
Arturo Gonzáles
MLN
President-elect
None
(Results annulled)

General elections were held in Guatemala on 20 October 1957. Miguel Ortiz Passarelli won the presidential election. However, the elections were nullified on 23 October 1957 following protests against electoral fraud, and fresh elections were held in 1958.

== Results ==
=== President ===
Candidate	Party	Votes	%
Miguel Ortiz Passarelli	National Democratic Movement	241,335	51.64
Miguel Ydígoras Fuentes	National Democratic Reconciliation Party	173,365	37.10
Miguel Asturias Quiñónez	Guatemalan Christian Democracy	52,600	11.26
Total		467,300	100.00
Source: Nohlen

== Bibliography ==
- Villagrán Kramer, Francisco. Biografía política de Guatemala: años de guerra y años de paz. FLACSO-Guatemala, 2004.
- Political handbook of the world 1957. New York, 1958.
