= Popular Liberation Front (Guatemala) =

Popular Liberation Front Frente Popular Libertador
- Abbreviation: FPL
- Founded: 1944
- Dissolved: 1950s
- Ideology: Social democracy Reformism; Agrarianism
- Political position: Center-left
- National affiliation: PRG

The Popular Liberation Front (Spanish: Frente Popular Libertador, or FPL) was a reformist Guatemalan political party formed in 1944 largely patronized by the middle class and university students. It was a part of the popular movement that overthrew dictator Jorge Ubico and began the Guatemalan Revolution. During this period, it was one of the two largest Guatemalan parties, the other being the National Renovation Party (PRN) led by teachers.

== History ==
In Guatemala's first democratic elections in 1944, it joined a broad coalition of revolutionary parties to support the election bid of Juan José Arévalo, but subsequently distanced itself from his government. In November 1945, it merged with the National Renovation Party to form the Revolutionary Action Party (PAR), but split from it eighteen months later. This split was partially the result of ideological differences, and partially the result of manipulations by Arévalo, who preferred to deal with a fractured opposition. During the period that it was a part of the PAR, as well as in alliance with the PRN, it enjoyed a majority in the Guatemalan Congress for the entire presidential term of Juan José Arévalo, and until 1949, it was the largest of the parties involved in the Guatemalan Revolution.

The FPL was also the most conservative of the revolutionary parties, until 1949. In that year the party split between those who supported the presidential candidacy of Francisco Javier Arana, and those who opposed him. Arana's supporters left to form the "FPL Ortodoxo," or the Orthodox FPL. In the 1950 election, the remainder of the FPL formally endorsed Víctor Manuel Giordani, but some party members defected to support Jorge García Granados, another moderate civilian, while still others supported Jacobo Árbenz, the defence minister and the administration's candidate. This infighting furthered the decline of the FPL.

== Notes and references ==
Sources

- Ameringer, Charles D. (1992). Political Parties of the Americas, 1980s to 1990s: Canada, Latin America, and the West Indies. Greenwood Publishing Group. ISBN 9780313274183.
- Gleijeses, Piero (1991). Shattered hope: the Guatemalan revolution and the United States, 1944–1954. Princeton University Press. ISBN 978-0-691-02556-8.
