= Juan José Arévalo =

24th President of Guatemala

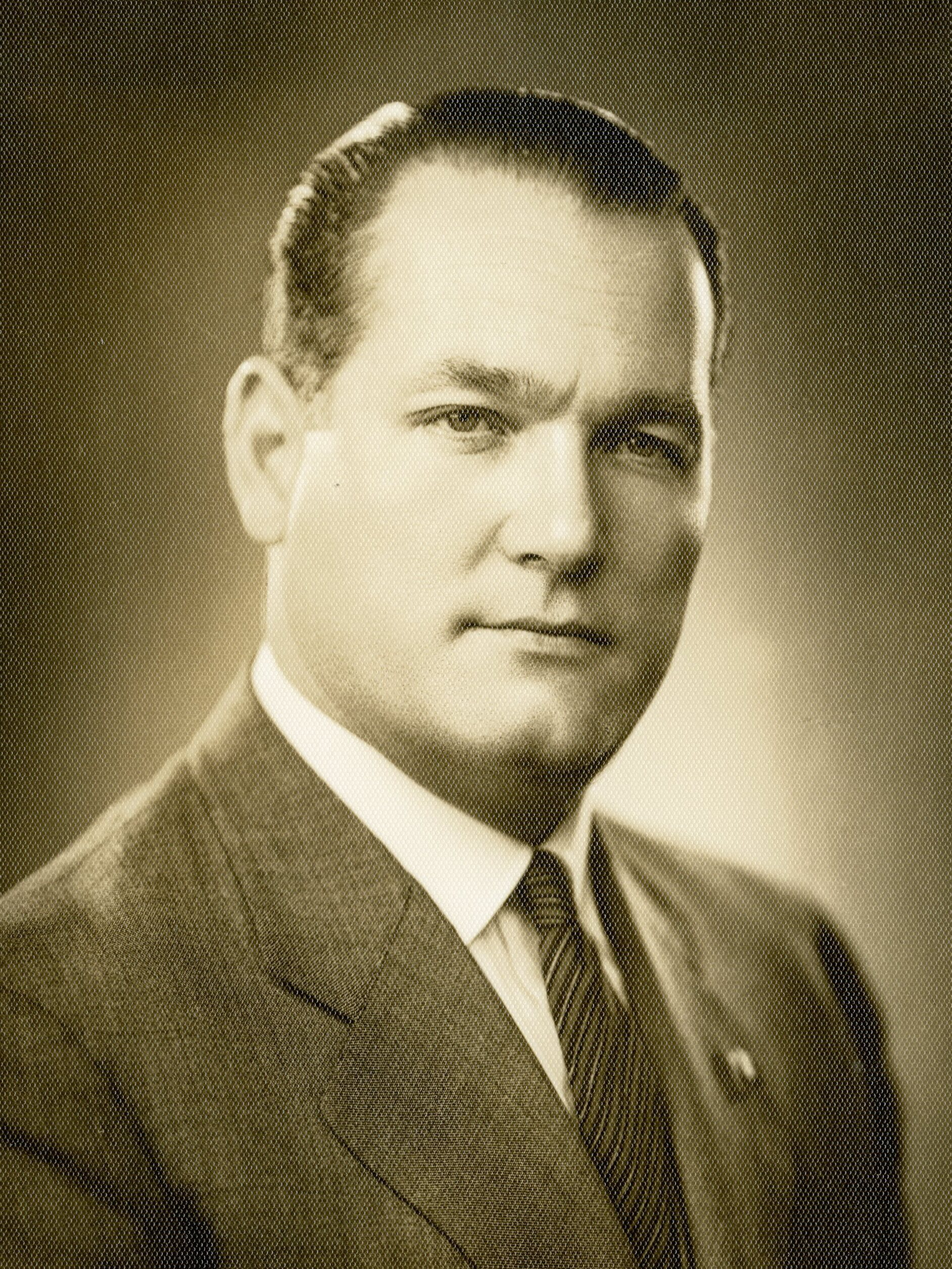
- Formal portrait, c. 1944

24th President of Guatemala
- In office 15 March 1945 – 15 March 1951
- Vice President: Mario Monteforte (1948–1949)
- Preceded by: Juan Federico Ponce Vaides
- Succeeded by: Jacobo Árbenz Guzmán

Personal details
- Born: 10 September 1904 Taxisco, Santa Rosa, Guatemala
- Died: 8 October 1990 (aged 86) Guatemala City, Guatemala
- Party: Revolutionary Action Party
- Spouse(s): Elisa Martínez Contreras (m. 1925; div. 1958) Margarita de León (m. 1959)
- Children: 5 (including Bernardo)
- Education: Escuela Normal para Varones (BEd); National University of La Plata (PhD)

Juan José Arévalo Bermejo (10 September 1904 – 8 October 1990) was a Guatemalan statesman and professor of philosophy who became Guatemala's first democratically elected president in 1945. He was elected following a popular uprising against the United States-backed dictator Jorge Ubico that began the Guatemalan Revolution. He remained in office until 1951, surviving 25 coup attempts. He did not contest the election of 1951, instead choosing to hand over power to Jacobo Árbenz. As president, he enacted several social reform policies, including an increase in the minimum wage and a series of literacy programs. He also oversaw the drafting of a new constitution in 1945. His son, Bernardo, became President of Guatemala in 2024.

Because of his reforms and policies that transcended his time, Juan José Arévalo is considered the most popular and influential president in the history of Guatemala.

== Biography ==
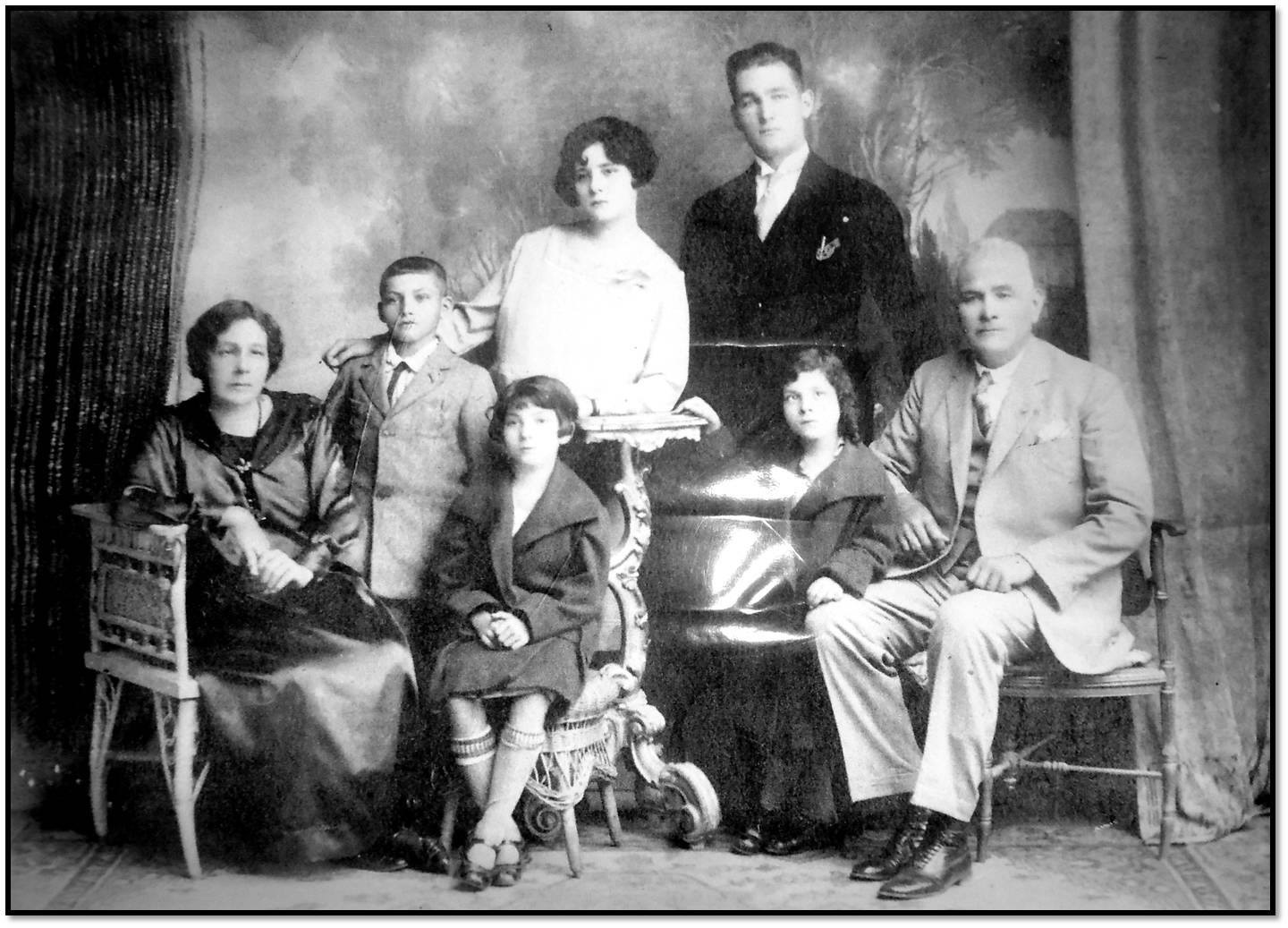
Arévalo Bermejo in his teenage years in a family portrait

=== Early years ===
Arévalo was born in Taxisco, Santa Rosa, on 10 September 1904, son of Mariano Arévalo Bonilla and Elena Bermejo de Paz. He was raised in a lower-middle class family. Beginning in childhood, he showed leadership and intelligence. At age seventeen, he was a fellow student of Luis Martínez Mont, and they became disciples of Professor Miguel Morazán at the Central Normal School for Boys, (from the Spanish "Escuela Normal Central para Varones").

Martínez Mont and Arévalo developed a close friendship. They studied teaching together and by 1923 they were already exemplary teachers at the Central Normal School for Boys. They also embarked on the creation of a literary magazine, which they called Alba. Although it only had four issues, it published texts by renowned Guatemalan writers Rafael Arévalo Martínez, Flavio Herrera, and Carlos Wyld Ospina.

In 1934 he obtained his doctorate in Philosophy and Educational Sciences from the Faculty of Humanities and Educational Sciences of the National University of La Plata, for the thesis entitled "The pedagogy of personality".

=== Teaching career ===
In 1927, as part of a nationwide educational reform project, the government of General Lázaro Chacón organized a teacher competition, where the best would be awarded scholarships to study pedagogy abroad. Martínez Mont and Arévalo both won, with the former leaving for Switzerland and the latter for Argentina.

The year 1932 was difficult for Arévalo: the government of General Jorge Ubico decided to cut the monthly pension sent to professors like Arévalo, which allowed them to devote themselves to study. At first they received 175 quetzales per month, but now they would only receive 116 quetzales. This reduction was due to the changes in education made by General Ubico, who did not continue the reform project that had been started by Generals José María Orellana and Lázaro Chacón.

=== Presidency ===
Arévalo served as Guatemalan president from 15 March 1945 to 15 March 1951. He was elected in 1944, in a contest which is generally reckoned as Guatemala's first truly free election. Arévalo won over 86 percent of the vote, more than four times as many votes as the other candidates combined. It is still the largest margin of victory for a free election in the country's history.

The six-year-term of Arévalo's administration was marked by an unprecedented freedom in the political life of the citizenry. As an educator and philosopher, Arévalo understood the need for advancement in individuals, communities, and nations by practical means. Before his presidency, he had been an exiled university professor. He returned to Guatemala to participate in the reconstruction efforts of the new post-Ubíco government, especially in the areas of social security. He also helped draft a new constitution which granted the people civil rights and liberties they had never previously known. His philosophy of "spiritual socialism," referred to as Arevalismo, may be considered less an economic system than a movement toward the liberation of the imagination of oppressed Latin America. In the post-World War II period, the governments of the United States and other countries misinterpreted Arevalismo as communism, serving as a cause for unease and alarm, which garnered support from neighboring satellite caudillos such as Anastasio Somoza García.

Many foreign estates, especially those undeveloped for agriculture, were confiscated and redistributed to peasants; landowners were obliged to provide adequate housing for their workers; new schools, hospitals, and houses were built; and a new minimum wage was introduced.

In Guatemala's cities, newly enfranchised labor unions accompanied reformist labor laws that greatly benefitted the urban lower and middle classes. Several parties and trade unions were formed. The enfranchisement of a large proportion of the population was a significant legacy of his term. The benefits did not spread to the rural agrarian areas where hacendado traditions, termed latifundia, remained patrician, racist, unyielding, and harsh. Whilst the government made some effort to improve campesino peasants' civil rights, rural conditions in Guatemala could not be improved without large-scale agrarian reform, proposed as mediated and fairly compensated land redistribution. Failure in achieving that was a weakness for Arévalo's party in Congress and thus for his administration, which his successor attempted to confront and to remedy with Decree 900.

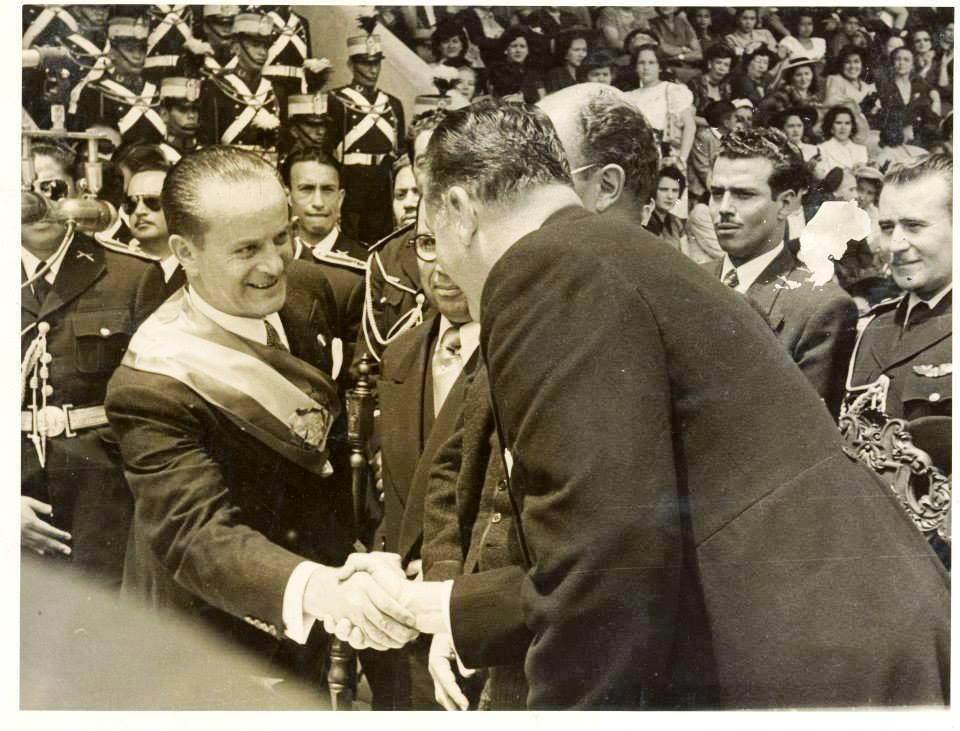
Inauguration of Jacobo Árbenz Guzmán

=== Post-presidency ===
Arévalo was succeeded by Jacobo Árbenz Guzmán, who continued the agrarian reform approach of Arévalo's government. Arévalo freely yielded succession to his presidency in 1951 to Jacobo Árbenz in the second democratic election in Guatemala's republican history. Following Árbenz's expulsion in 1954, open democracy would not return to a destabilized Guatemala for three decades. Arévalo went into voluntary exile in Mexico as a university professor and writer. In 1956, he would write a notable book called "The Shark and the Sardines," which attacked the United States Government and powerful American companies for their treatment of Latin America. "The Shark and the Sardines" would be endorsed by American sociologist C. Wright Mills in his 1961 book Listen Yankee!

On 27 March 1963, Arévalo returned to Guatemala to announce his candidacy for the November presidential elections. Dictator Miguel Ydígoras Fuentes, who (despite the firm opposition of the Kennedy administration) had pledged to oversee a free and open election in which Arévalo would participate, flew into exile to Nicaragua after he was deposed in a coup on 31 March 1963. Enrique Peralta Azurdia then seized power, and Arévalo fled the country again.

=== Later years ===
Arévalo would return to Guatemala in the mid-1970s, and later held a meeting with civilian Guatemala President Vinicio Cerezo hours after he was inaugurated on 14 January 1986. During the meeting, Arévalo praised the transition from military to civilian rule and even stated that "The October revolution is going to have a second chapter," though these hopes would soon be dashed by persistent human rights abuses, an ineffectual civilian administration and deep economic problems. On 7 October 1990, Arévalo died in Guatemala City.

== Spiritual socialism (Arevalismo) ==
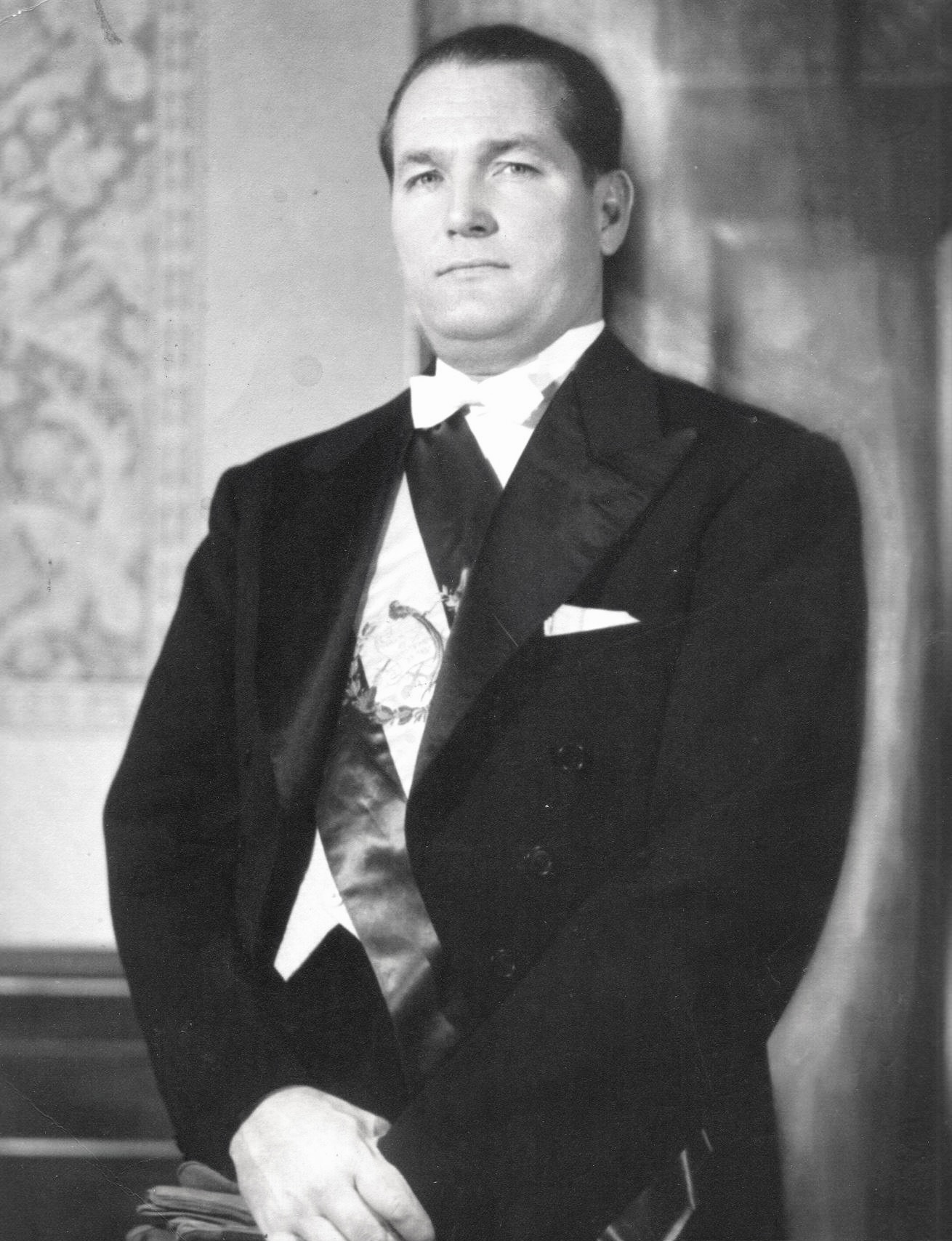
President Juan José Arévalo during his inauguration

Categorized as a dedicated democrat and nationalist, Juan José Arévalo defined his political philosophy as "spiritual socialism". The ideology was directed towards the moral development of Guatemalans with the intent to "liberate man psychologically". Arévalo, the revolution's intellectual pillar, positioned his theoretical doctrine as integral to the construction of a progressive and peaceful Guatemalan society. Governments are capable of initiating the formation of an ideal society by allowing citizens the freedom to pursue their own opinions, property and way of life. The revolution's first president asserted that safeguarding the free will of citizens generates popular support for governmental institutions, which ensure the security of the individual and collective equally.

Arevalismo did emphasize the importance of civil freedoms as the essential groundwork for human development, but the political principle maintained that "Individual liberty must be exercised within the limits of social order". Democracy, according to Arévalo, was a social structure that required the restriction of civil rights in the event individual liberties conflict with national security and the will of the majority. The limit on civil rights appears contradictory to the notion of a Guatemalan government that expresses the free will of the people. However, the ambiguity is associated with Arévalo's dismissal of classical liberalism as an applicable guideline for Guatemalan governments. Arévalo's rejection of Western oriented liberal individualism and apparent socialist inclinations led conservative sectors of the press to denounce the revolutionary president as a communist.

Arévalo opposed classical Marxism's materialist tendency and affirmed that "Communism is contrary to human nature, for it is contrary to the psychology of man". Spiritual socialism's anti-communist stance was apparent through Arévalo's suppression of various communist influenced initiatives operating in Guatemala. The president exiled several communist activists, declined to legalize the Communist Party of Guatemala, removed government officials with ties to the communist newspaper and shut down the Marxist instruction facility known as Escuela Claridad. Regardless of the aforementioned measures, Arévalo endured nearly 30 attempted coups from members of the Guatemalan military due to his perceived empathy for communists. He responded to anti-communist attacks in a speech to the U.S. Congress in which he said, referring to World War II, "I fear the West has won the battle, but in its blind attacks on social welfare will lose the war to fascism."

The character of the 1944 revolution, envisioned by Arévalo, was based on the development of a modern social democratic society. A conversion from the remaining presence of feudalistic arrangements to a democratic socialist system was an aspiration of the revolutionary Guatemalan government. Arévalo's political philosophy stressed the importance of government intervention in the realm of economic and social interests as necessary to sustain the desires of the majority's free will. Deviating from Marxism, Arévalo valued property rights with the aim to subordinate them to benefit Guatemala as a whole if required. Overall, Arévalo sought to improve the social environment of the working majority through social democracy and democratic socialism. As a result, Arévalo faced at least 25 unsuccessful coup attempts during his presidency.

== Private life ==
Arévalo was married to Elisa Martínez Contreras, but at the time of his presidency they were separated, yet Martínez assumed the role of first lady. He had a relationship with Alaíde Foppa, by whom he had a son, Julio Solórzano Foppa. At the time of his death, he was married to Margarita de Leon and had five children, including Bernardo Arévalo, who became President in 2024.

== Works ==
He is the author of a scathing allegorical short story "The Shark and the Sardines," published in 1956. In 1963 he published a sequel entitled "Anti-Communism in Latin America".

== Death ==
Arévalo Bermejo died in October 1990 in a hospital in Guatemala City at the age of 86, and was buried in Taxisco, Santa Rosa. He was the only president to receive a state funeral.

== See also ==
- History of Guatemala
- Jacobo Árbenz Guzmán
- Jorge Ubico
- Operation PBSuccess
- Guatemalan Institute of Social Security
- Guatemalan Revolution
- Bernardo Arévalo

== References and notes ==
Political offices
Preceded by Juan Federico Ponce	President of Guatemala; 1945–1951	Succeeded by Jacobo Árbenz Guzmán
