= National Renovation Party =

National Renovation Party Partido Renovación Nacional
- Abbreviation: PRN
- Founded: 1 July 1944
- Dissolved: 1954
- Ideology: Reformism; Progressivism
- Political position: Center-left
- National affiliation: PAR (1945–1947)

The National Renovation Party (Spanish: Partido Renovación Nacional, PRN) was a reformist and progressive political party in Guatemala that was supportive of the government of Jacobo Arbenz. The PRN was founded by a group of the young revolutionaries on 1 July 1944, following the overthrow of dictator Jorge Ubico and the beginning of the Guatemalan Revolution. Its founders included Juan José Orozco Posadas, and Mario Efraín Nájera Farfán. The PRN was known as a “teachers' party”, in contrast to the Popular Liberation Front (FPL), which was seen as a "students' party”. During this period the PRN and the FPL were the largest of the revolutionary parties.

In the 1944 elections, the first democratic elections that had been held in the country, the PRN nominated Juan José Arévalo as its candidate. In November 1945 it merged with the FPL to form the Revolutionary Action Party (PAR) but split from it eighteen months later. This split was partially the result of ideological differences, and partially the result of manipulations by Arévalo, who preferred to deal with a fractured opposition. After some hesitation the PRN joined the Party of the Guatemalan Revolution in June 1952, but withdrew a month later. PRN was the smallest party in the coalition governments of Jacobo Árbenz (1951-1954). It was disbanded after the coup d'état of 1954.

== Notes and references ==
Sources

- Gleijeses, Piero (1991). Shattered hope: the Guatemalan revolution and the United States, 1944–1954. Princeton University Press. ISBN 978-0-691-02556-8.
