= Miguel Ydígoras Fuentes =

32nd President of Guatemala (1958-63)

Divisional General Miguel Ydígoras Fuentes
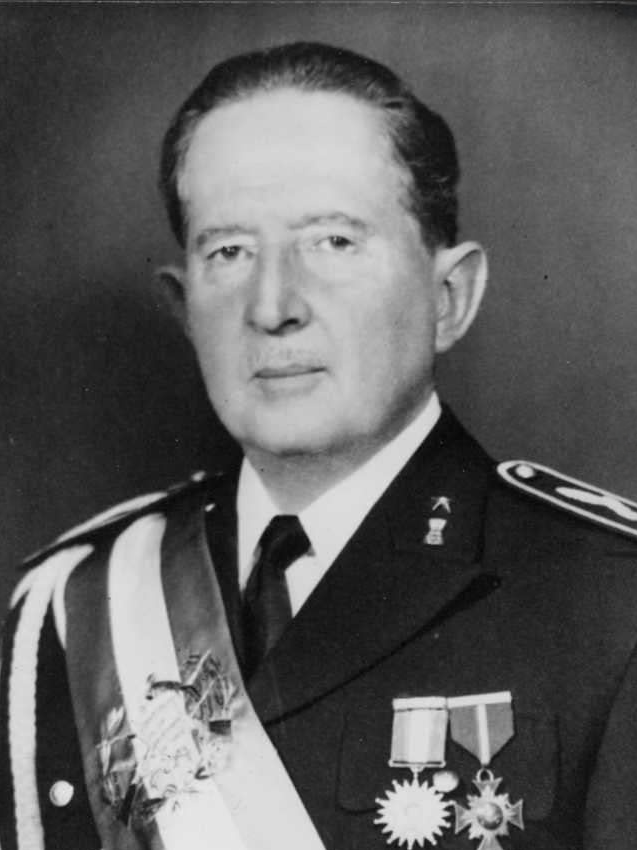
- Official portrait, c. 1958

32nd President of Guatemala
- In office 2 March 1958 – 31 March 1963
- Preceded by: Guillermo Flores Avendaño (acting)
- Succeeded by: Enrique Peralta Azurdia

Personal details
- Born: José Miguel Ramón Ydígoras Fuentes; 17 October 1895 Retalhuleu, Guatemala
- Died: 27 October 1982 (aged 87) Guatemala City, Guatemala
- Party: National Democratic Reconciliation Party
- Spouse: María Teresa Laparra
- Occupation: Politician, military officer, diplomat

Military service
- Allegiance: Guatemala
- Branch/service: Guatemalan Army
- Rank: Divisional general

José Miguel Ramón Ydígoras Fuentes (17 October 1895 – 27 October 1982) was a Guatemalan military officer and politician who served as the 32nd president of Guatemala from 1958 to March 1963. He was also the main challenger to Jacobo Árbenz during the 1950 presidential election. Ydígoras previously served as the governor of the province of San Marcos.

== Early life and military career ==
Ydígoras Fuentes was born on a coffee plantation, in Pueblo Nuevo in the Guatemalan department of Retalhuleu, on 17 October 1895. He retained a great fondness for coffee as an adult, claiming to drink 10 cups of it in a day, and describing it as a "patriotic vice", referring to Guatemala's high coffee production. He enrolled in Guatemala's military academy, and graduated at the top of his class. He was commissioned in the Guatemalan infantry in 1915. He was posted to the Guatemalan embassy in Washington, D.C., in 1918, and to the Paris embassy in 1919. In the same year he represented Guatemala at the Paris Peace Conference. He subsequently held various posts in the military academy, before becoming a governor of the province of San Marcos in 1922.

Ydígoras was appointed a general in 1937. He served as governor under the government of dictator Jorge Ubico until 1939, when Ubico appointed him director of roads. After Ubico was overthrown in the October revolution, Ydígoras was sent first to Washington, D.C., and then London, in diplomatic exile. During the government of Juan José Arévalo, Ydígoras was linked to several of the 25 attempted coups during 1945–1951. He returned to Guatemala in 1950. In the 1950 Guatemalan presidential election, Ydígoras was the main opponent of Árbenz. The elections were broadly free and fair, except that women who could not read were still disenfranchised. Although Ydígoras had the support of landowners, he lacked popular support, and did not have the backing of major political parties as Árbenz did. Árbenz eventually won the election with 258,987 votes to 72,796 for Ydígoras, out of a total of 404,739.

The United States Central Intelligence Agency (CIA) considered Ydígoras as a candidate to lead the 1954 Guatemalan coup d'état, because he had support among the Guatemalan opposition. However, he was rejected for his role in the Jorge Ubico regime, as well as his European visage, which was unlikely to appeal to the mostly mixed-race mestizo population. Carlos Castillo Armas was chosen instead. Ydígoras later claimed that in 1953, he had been introduced to two CIA agents by Walter Turnbull, an official of the United Fruit Company, and offered support to overthrow Árbenz. Ydígoras said he refused their terms, which included favoring the United Fruit Company, abolishing the railway worker's union, and establishing a dictatorship similar to that of Ubico. Ydígoras later agreed to help Castillo Armas in his own coup attempt, a fact which came to the attention of the Árbenz government before it fell. After Castillo Armas took power following the 1954 Guatemalan coup d'etat, Ydígoras was made ambassador to Colombia.

== Election as president ==
Carlos Castillo Armas was assassinated in 1957, and elections were held immediately afterwards by a military junta. These elections were so fraudulent that popular outcry forced a fresh ballot. Another election was held in 1958, in which Ydígoras was elected. His administration saw continual corruption scandals. There was significant social turmoil following his election, and demonstrations and protests against the government and against electoral fraud were common during his administration. These protests eventually grew into the guerrilla group MR-13.

In July 1958 a senior CIA Chief described Ydígoras as, "known to be a moody, almost schizophrenic individual" who "regularly disregards the advice of his Cabinet and other close associates". The beginning of the leftist rebellion led to Ydígoras being accused of being "soft on communism" by other figures within the army. During his presidency, Ydígoras allowed the CIA to train the Cuban exile force that would be used in the failed 1961 Bay of Pigs Invasion.

Several coups were attempted against him in the early 1960s, but they all failed, including one rebellion by the air force in 1962. In 1963, Ydígoras's defense minister Colonel Enrique Peralta Azurdia eventually toppled Ydígoras. Peralta claimed that the entire government had been infiltrated by communists, abrogated the constitution, and took over as the head of state. Peralta's coup had the backing of several opposition parties, who wished to end the possibility that former left-of-center civilian president Juan José Arévalo would return to Guatemala and run as a candidate in the upcoming elections.

== Later life ==
Later in his life, Ydígoras was bitter about the failure of the Bay of Pigs invasion. In exile in El Salvador in 1974, he stated that he had been made a scapegoat for the failure, and that the US was responsible for his overthrow. Ydígoras died of a cerebral hemorrhage in October 1982, in a military hospital in Guatemala City, at the age of 87. He was survived by his wife and two children.

== Sources ==
- Gleijeses, Piero (1991). Shattered hope: the Guatemalan revolution and the United States, 1944–1954. Princeton University Press. ISBN 978-0-691-02556-8.
- Gordon, Max (Summer 1971). "A Case History of U. S. Subversion: Guatemala, 1954". Science and Society. 35 (2): 129–155. JSTOR 40401561.
- Immerman, Richard H. (1982). The CIA in Guatemala: The Foreign Policy of Intervention. University of Texas Press. ISBN 978-0-292-71083-2.
- May, Rachel (March 1999). ""Surviving All Changes is Your Destiny": Violence and Popular Movements in Guatemala". Latin American Perspectives. 26 (2): 68–91. doi:10.1177/0094582x9902600204. S2CID 143564997.

Political offices
Preceded by Guillermo Flores Avendaño (acting)	President of Guatemala; 1958–1963	Succeeded by Enrique Peralta Azurdia
