= Revolutionary Action Party =

Guatemalan former political party

Revolutionary Action Party Partido Acción Revolucionaria
- Leader: Víctor Manuel Gutiérrez (last)
- Founded: 1945
- Dissolved: 1954
- Headquarters: Guatemala City
- Ideology: Social democracy Democratic socialism Agrarianism; Populism; Labourism
- Political position: Centre-left to left-wing
- National affiliation: PRG (1952–1953)

The Revolutionary Action Party (Spanish: Partido Acción Revolucionaria, PAR) was a leftist political party in Guatemala during the ten-year Guatemalan Revolution. Formed in 1945, the party went through a series of mergers and fractures before dissolving in 1954 after the United States-backed coup d'état.

== Formation ==
The PAR was formed in late 1945 through the merger of the National Renovation Party (PRN) and the Popular Liberation Front (FPL), which had supported the presidency of Juan José Arévalo. The two parties together held a large majority in parliament during the entirety of Arévalo's term. 18 months after coming together, the FPL and the RN split again, but the PAR survived the split and remained a political player. The fracturing of the PAR was partially due to the manipulations of Arévalo, who preferred not to confront a single large party in parliament.

The leadership of the party, similar to that of other major Guatemalan parties of the period, was composed of middle-class urban youth, especially those who had been involved in the university uprisings during the October Revolution. Leaders of the party included José Manuel Fortuny, Victor Manuel Gutierrez, and Augusto Charnaud McDonald.

== Leftist turn and split ==
In 1946, several radical figures within the PAR made a successful effort to take over important leadership positions within the party. Fortuny, who had become secretary general of the PAR in 1945, was a member of this push. One year later, Fortuny and other young radical figures founded a covert group within the PAR called the Vanguardia Democratica (Democratic Vanguard), which believed in Marxist politics. This group, which included Guerra Borges, Silva Jonama, and Alvarado Monzón, continually clashed with the more conservative factions of the party, led by Charnaud MacDonald and Humberto González Huárez. At the 1949 party convention, this Marxist faction was defeated in a 382–120 vote. They were given some positions within the party to maintain unity, but were unable to influence its course of action any more. Fortuny was removed from the position of secretary general, a position he had held since 1945.

At approximately the same time, Fortuny was approached twice by Francisco Javier Arana, seeking the PAR's support for his candidacy in the next presidential election. Fortuny demurred, stating that Arana was not friendly enough to the labor movement. Instead, the PAR became willing to support Jacobo Árbenz, who they believed was more willing to enact progressive change. Árbenz' candidacy in the 1950 presidential election was announced on 5 February 1950 by the PIN, and the PAR endorsed him soon afterward.

From 1947 to 1949 the PAR was the furthest left among the three major parties. Although it remained smaller than the FPL, it was the strongest backer of organized labor. It grew steadily more distant from Arévalo over the years. In 1949, frustrated because they were unable to take complete control of the PAR, Fortuny and his colleagues founded the Partido Comunista de Guatemala (Communist Party of Guatemala), which later became the Partido Guatemalteco del Trabajo (Guatemalan Party of Labor: PGT). On 20 May 1950 Fortuny and nine others resigned from the PAR, and formally announced that they were leaving to start a communist party.

== Presidency of Árbenz ==
In July 1951 the PAR split once again, when some members left to form the Partido Socialista (Socialist Party: PS), described by observers as a party without a specific ideology. This faction was led by Charnaud MacDonald. In June 1952, the PAR joined the FPL, the National Renovation Party, the PIN and the PS to form the Party of the Guatemalan Revolution (PRG) to support Jacobo Arbenz' agrarian reform program. However, this lasted only six weeks before it broke up again into its constituents. Despite these splits, the PAR was the mainstay of the government coalition from 1951 to 1954.

The PAR drew significant support from the CNCG, the largest labor union in Guatemala at the time. The CNCG, founded in 1950 by a PAR deputy named Castillo Flores, had its base among farm laborers, and thus grew in strength after the implementation of the agrarian reform policy of 1952. The CNCG was nominally independent of any single party, but lent its support to all the parties that had taken part in the 1944 revolution, including the PAR, the FPL, and the RN. It was an anti-communist group, and thus opposed the PGT of Fortuny. When Charnaud MacDonald left to form the PS in 1951, the CNCG led by Castillo Flores briefly shifted its loyalty to the PS. However, soon afterward Árbenz showed his continued support of the PAR by appointing a director of the agrarian reform program from within the ranks of the PAR. Following this, Flores and the CNCG returned to supporting the PAR.

== Infighting and dissolution ==
The PAR experienced significant infighting following its separation from the PRG. In October 1953, Secretary General Francisco Fernández Foncea stood up in parliament while intoxicated, and stated that he supported the communist PGT, while describing the PAR as a "temporary party." A newly elected executive board expelled him. Foncea proceeded to storm the party headquarters with a band of supporters, seeking to "save" the party from its new executive committee. For many months afterward, party cadre were bombarded with messages from both factions, each seeking to ensure their loyalty.

The party disbanded after the coup d'état of 1954.

== Sources ==
- Berger, Susan A. (1992). Political and agrarian development in Guatemala. Boulder, Colorado, USA: Westview Press.
- Gleijeses, Piero (1991). Shattered Hope: The Guatemalan Revolution and the United States, 1944–1954. Princeton, New Jersey, USA: Princeton University Press. ISBN 978-0-691-02556-8.
- Schlesinger, Stephen; Kinzer, Stephen (1 June 1982). Bitter Fruit: The Story of the American Coup in Guatemala. Sinclair Browne. pp. 55–59. ISBN 978-0-86300-023-2.
