= Manuel Colom Argueta =

Mayor of Guatemala City
- In office July 1, 1970 – July 1, 1974
- Preceded by: Ramiro Ponce Monroy
- Succeeded by: Leonel Ponciano León

Personal details
- Born: 8 April 1932 Guatemala City, Guatemala
- Died: 22 March 1979 (aged 46) Guatemala City
- Party: Unidad Revolucionaria Democrática (URD), Frente Unido Revolucionario Democrático (FURD), Frente Unido de la Revolución (FUR)
- Spouse: Anna Borghini
- Children: 3
- Parent(s): Antonio Colom, Filly Argueta
- Education: Universidad de San Carlos
- Occupation: Politician, lawyer, Professor
- Nickname: Meme Colom

Manuel Colom Argueta (8 April 1932 – 22 March 1979) was mayor of Guatemala City and an important progressive leader of the opposition in Guatemala.

== Early life and education ==
Born in Guatemala City, Colom studied at the El Rosario school, the Liceo Infantil and Escuela Nacional República de Costa Rica (1940–1946), completing his secondary schooling at the Instituto Nacional Central para Varones (INCV) where he became student association president. He graduated as one of the top students. He entered the College of Law at the University of San Carlos of Guatemala in 1950, again becoming a student leader there.

Colom became involved in national campaigns for democracy and against the dictatorships during his studies and in 1955 was one of 33 citizens to publicly oppose the plebiscite aimed at confirming Carlos Castillo in power. He was targeted in the armed break-up of a student protest on 25 June 1956 which left several students dead. He graduated as a lawyer and notary in 1957. He was granted a scholarship to continue his studies in Florence, Italy.

== Career ==
Manuel Colom helped to found the Partido Revolucionario (Revolutionary Party), later leaving the party claiming it had abandoned its democratic ideals.

Back in Guatemala from Italy in 1960, Colom became involved in the '13 de Noviembre' movement backed by army officers against the government of Miguel Ydígoras, soon leaving after differences over tactics. In 1961, he was one of the founders of the Unidad Revolucionaria Democrática (URD), which led opposition to Ydígoras and Enrique Peralta. In March–April 1962, students and workers rose up against the government; student and political leaders were sought. In the same year, he married an Italian, Anna Borghini, in Florence. Then together, returned to live in Guatemala and they had three children (Lorena, Mónica and Rodolfo). On 25 January 1963, Colom and other leaders were detained, later forced into exile in El Salvador, where he worked at the National University.

In 1964, Colom was named Secretary General of the URD. In 1970, the URD, as the 'Civic Committee' proposed him as candidate for Mayor of Guatemala City, and he won the election comfortably. The Presidency was won by General Carlos Arana with Dr. Adolfo Mijangos López elected deputy for the Central District. Colom rolled out a wide municipal programme and worked as President of ANAM, the national association of Guatemalan municipalities. In 1973 he fought to have FURD – the Frente Unido Revolucionario Democrático – approved by the electoral commission so that it could fight the 1974 general election. The move was blocked by several delaying tactics, apparently as Colom would have had a good chance of winning the presidency. He was proposed as a candidate by members of other parties, but these moves were blocked by traditionalists. The opposition parties eventually backed Efraín Ríos Montt as candidate and claim to have won the elections. However, Kjell Laugerud became president after alleged massive electoral fraud. In 1975, Colom returned to Florence on another scholarship where he studied urban planning.

In 1976, Colom returned and once again tried to form and register a political party – the Frente Unido de la Revolución (FUR). The same year there was an attempt on his life that left Colom injured and reliant on bodyguards after further attempts and threats. He continued his academic work at San Carlos University, combining this with politics. On 15 March 1979, FUR was finally registered as a political party after several years.

== Death ==
On 22 March 1979, a week later after his party was registered, Colom was assassinated, receiving 45 bullet wounds, having been the target of a carefully planned military operation led by Major General Cancinos, that included army helicopters and several military resources (Cancinos was assassinated 3 months later). This assassination, under the military-dominated and repressive regime of General Fernando Romeo Lucas (President 1978–1982), was one of several, including Social Democrat Party founder Alberto Fuentes Mohr.

== Honors ==
On 22 March 2009 the Government of Guatemala granted to Manuel Colom Argueta, post mortem, the Order of the Quetzal in the grade of the Grand Cross, as part of the 30th anniversary of his murder. The Order of the Quetzal was delivered to Manuel Colom Argueta's children by president Alvaro Colom Caballeros.

== See also ==
- Mario Méndez Montenegro - Assassinated Guatemalan mayor
- Álvaro Colom - Former president of Guatemala and nephew
- 1954 Guatemalan coup
- Guatemalan civil war

== Bibliography ==
- Castellanos Montúfar, Sagrario (2006). "Manuel Colom Argueta" (PDF). Colección Rescate de la Memoria Histórica de la Persona (in Spanish). Guatemala: Procuraduría de los Derechos Humanos.
- Cifuentes Rivas, Américo (22 May 2012). "Manuel Colom Argueta a 33 años de su asesinato". La Hora (in Spanish). Archived from the original on 25 March 2012.
- Comisión para el Esclarecimiento Histórico (1999). "Ejecuciones arbitrarias de Alberto Fuentes Mohr y Manuel Colom Argueta". Guatemala: memoria del silencio (in Spanish) (online ed.). PCDH, Asociación Americana del Avance de la Ciencia. Archived from the original on 6 May 2013.
- Diario de Centro América (20 May 1974). "Los hombres pasan pero sus obras quedan". Diario de Centro América, periódico oficial de la República de Guatemala (in Spanish). Guatemala.
- Sandoval, Marta (22 March 2009). "Manuel Colom Argueta y la promesa de Lucas". El Periódico (in Spanish). Archived from the original on 2 November 2012.
- Secretaría de la Paz (SEPAZ) (2009). "Manuel Colom Argueta". sepaz.gob.gt (in Spanish). Archived from the original on 8 October 2011.
