= Mano Blanca =

Guatemalan death squad

Movement of Organized Nationalist Action
- Movimiento de Acción Nacionalista Organizado; MANO
- Movimiento de Liberación Nacional Flag
- Leader: Raúl Lorenzana
- Dates active: 1966–1978
- Country: Guatemala
- Allegiance: Guatemala Armed Forces (non-sanctioned)
- Ideology: Radical anti-communism
- Political position: Far-right
- Part of: National Liberation Movement
- Wars: Guatemalan Civil War

Mano Blanca (Spanish for 'White Hand') was a Guatemalan far-right, anti-communist death squad, set up in 1966 to prevent Julio César Méndez Montenegro from being inaugurated as the president of Guatemala. While initially autonomous from the government, it was absorbed into the Guatemalan State's counter-terror apparatus and evolved into a paramilitary unit of the Guatemalan armed forces, and was responsible for the murder and torture of thousands of people in rural Guatemala. The group received support from the Guatemalan army and government, as well as from the United States. The group was officially known as the Movimiento de Acción Nacionalista Organizado (English: Movement of Organized Nationalist Action) which gives the acronym "MANO" (Spanish: hand). The group was variously known by its full name, by MANO, or most popularly by Mano Blanca, or "White Hand."

== History ==
=== Background ===
The United States backed coup in 1954 brought Carlos Castillo Armas to power. Along with other people with fascist leanings, he started the National Liberation Movement (Movimiento de Liberación Nacional, or MLN). The founders of the party described it as the "party of organized violence." The new government promptly reversed the democratic reforms initiated during the Guatemalan Revolution and the agrarian reform program that was the main project of president Jacobo Arbenz Guzman and which directly impacted the interests of both the United Fruit Company and the Guatemalan landowners.

After the 1954 coup d'état, the MLN became in effect the party of the Guatemalan landowners and military. However, the leftist guerrillas in the country were very active during the 1960s, especially after a failed coup on November 13, 1960, by progressive army officers who wished to set up a democratic government. In response to this threat, the Guatemalan government acted on the advice of the military attaché at the United States embassy and helped set up several vigilante groups throughout the country. The establishment of several new government death squads also coincided with a rise in US involvement with the counter-insurgency, with the transfer of weapons and techniques that had been used in the Vietnam War. A thousand Green Berets were also sent by the United States, along with military consultants, some of whom were implicated in the setting up of the death squads.

=== Mano Blanca as a death squad ===
Mano Blanca, or the Movement of Organized Nationalist Action, was set up in 1966 as a front for the MLN to carry out its more violent activities, along with many other similar groups, including the New Anticommunist Organization and the Anticommunist Council of Guatemala. These three groups operated within the United States supported government arm known as the Regional Telecommunications Center – La Regional – which linked them to various government, military and police agencies. This network was built on the Committees against Communism created by the Central Intelligence Agency after the coup in 1954. The members of Mano Blanca were largely army officers, and the outfit received a lot of its funding from planters. It also received information from military intelligence. The MANO was distinct from other "death squads" operating at the same time, as it was initially formed as an independent paramilitary organization, unlike the CADEG or the NOA which were primarily front organizations operated exclusively by the military and security services.

Armed with the support and coordination of the Guatemalan Armed Forces, Mano Blanca began a campaign described by the United States Department of State as one of "kidnappings, torture, and summary execution." One of the main targets of Mano Blanca was the Partido Revolucionario (PR), an anti-communist group that was the only major reform oriented party allowed to operate under the military-dominated regime. Other targets included the banned leftist parties. The PR drew a lot of its members from the activist base that had been created during the agrarian reform program begun by former president Jacobo Arbenz in 1952, and these individuals were targeted by the Mano Blanca. When it was founded, the group had the specific aim of preventing Julio César Méndez Montenegro of the PR from taking power. During the 1960s, Mano Blanca's front man was Raúl Lorenzana. Lorenzana was close to the Guatemalan military and operated out of the headquarters of the Guatemalan Army's Cuartel de Matamoros and a government safehouse at La Aurora airbase.

Human rights activist Blase Bonpane described the activities of Mano Blanca as being an integral part of the policy of the Guatemalan government, and by extension the policy of the United States government and the Central Intelligence Agency. One of the deaths Mano Blanca was responsible for was that of César Montenegro Paniagua, a communist politician who was killed in retribution for the killing of West German ambassador Karl von Spreti by FAR guerrillas. Mano Blanca also sent death threats to one of the leaders of a student organization. Bonpane reported that the leader of Mano Blanca had told him the death threats had been made because he was a communist, and would "give his life for the poor." Overall, Mano Blanca was responsible for thousands of murders and kidnappings, leading travel writer Paul Theroux to refer to them as "Guatemala's version of a volunteer Gestapo unit."

Mano Blanca was active during the governments of colonel Carlos Arana Osorio and general Kjell Laugerud García and was dissolved by general Fernando Romeo Lucas García in 1978.

== Bibliography ==
- Blum, William (2003). Killing Hope: US Military and CIA interventions since World War II. Zed Books. pp. 233–234. ISBN 978-1-84277-369-7.
- Bonpane, Blase (12 May 2000). Guerrillas of Peace: Liberation Theology and the Central American Revolution. iUniverse. pp. 30–50. ISBN 978-0-595-00418-8.
- Batz, Giovanni (2013). "Military Factionalism and the Consolidation of Power in 1960s Guatemala". In Garrard-Burnett, Virginia; Lawrence, Mark Atwood; Moreno, Julia E. (eds.). Beyond the Eagle's Shadow: New Histories of Latin America's Cold War. University of New Mexico Press. pp. 64–65. ISBN 978-0-8263-5369-6.
- Ibarra, Carlos Figueroa (June 2006). "The culture of terror and Cold War in Guatemala". Journal of Genocide Research. 8 (2): 191–208. doi:10.1080/14623520600703081. S2CID 72555904.
- Grandin, Greg; Klein, Naomi (30 July 2011). The Last Colonial Massacre: Latin America in the Cold War. University of Chicago Press. pp. 87–89. ISBN 978-0-226-30690-2.
- Levenson-Estrada, Deborah (Winter 2003). "The Life That Makes Us Die/The Death That Makes Us Live: Facing Terrorism in Guatemala City". Radical History Review. 2003 (85): 94–104. doi:10.1215/01636545-2003-85-94. S2CID 143353418.
- McClintock, Michael (1985). The American connection: State terror and popular resistance in Guatemala. Zed books. ISBN 978-0-86232-241-0.
- Rothenburg, David, ed. (2012). Memory of Silence: The Guatemalan Truth Commission Report. Palgrave Macmillan. pp. 112–113. ISBN 978-1-137-01114-5.
- Theroux, Paul (2014). The Old Patagonian Express. Houghton Mifflin Harcourt. pp. 100–103. ISBN 978-0-547-52400-9.
- Washington Post (7 April 1970). "Guatemala Red Killed For Revenge". Washington Post.
