= Oscar Clemente Marroquín =

Guatemalan journalist and writer

First Councilman of the Guatemala City Council
- In office 2 June 1974 – 2 June 1978

Personal details
- Born: Oscar Clemente Marroquín Godoy; 28 December 1949 (age 76) Guatemala City, Guatemala
- Party: Independent (since 1986)
- Other political affiliations: DCG (1984–86); Revolutionary (until 1984)
- Spouse: María Mercedes Pérez
- Children: 6
- Education: Universidad de San Carlos de Guatemala
- Occupation: Journalist and writer
- Website: lahora.gt

Oscar Clemente Marroquín Godoy (born 28 December 1949) is a Guatemalan lawyer, politician, journalist and writer, he was director of La Hora. He was succeeded by his son Pedro Pablo Marroquín Pérez.

== Biography ==
Marroquín was First Councilman of the City of Guatemala from 1974 to 1978 during the municipal government of Manuel Colom Argueta, he served as Acting Mayor of Guatemala City in 1977 to 1978. After the departure of Marroquín from the Revolutionary Party, he joined the Guatemalan Christian Democracy party, being a candidate for mayor of Guatemala City in 1985. Marroquín was in third place.

In July 2018, he assisted former Attorney General Thelma Aldana to a meeting in El Salvador with the Encuentro por Guatemala, Libre and Movimiento Semilla parties; also with some representatives of political groups like the extinct far-right party National Liberation Movement, to explore a possible coalition for 2019 general election.

Marroquín was frequently mentioned as the possible running mate of Thelma Aldana.

== Personal life ==
Marroquín is grandson of former Vice President of Guatemala Clemente Marroquín Rojas and son of Oscar Jesús Marroquín Milla and Sara Victoria Godoy Cofiño.
