= 1963 Guatemalan coup d'état =

- Part of the Cold War
Date	March 30–31, 1963
Location	Guatemala City, Guatemala
Status	Military rule until July 1, 1966

Belligerents
Guatemalan Armed Forces	Government of Guatemala

Commanders and leaders
Enrique Peralta Azurdia; Catalino Chavez	Miguel Ydígoras Fuentes

Units involved
Guardia de Honor; Mariscal Zavala	Unknown

The 1963 Guatemalan coup d'état was a successful US-backed power grab in Guatemala by the Guatemalan military, led by Colonel Enriuqe Peralta Azurdia, which ousted the Miguel Ydígoras Fuentes administration. The military junta headed by the colonel governed the country until the restoration of civilian rule in 1966, peacefully handing power to Julio César Méndez Montenegro on July 1.

== Motives ==
The coup's aims, instigated and supported by the Kennedy administration, were not to depose democratically elected President Miguel Ydígoras Fuentes, a dedicated anti-Communist, but instead to prevent the imminent electoral victory of Juan José Arévalo in the upcoming November elections, who was perceived to be a Communist. In a meeting held by US President John F. Kennedy and his top advisers, the American Ambassador to Guatemala John O. Bell advocated for a coup against the Latin-American country, insisting that Arévalo's election must be prevented at any cost. His view was opposed by Teodoro Moscoso, administrator of the Alliance for Progress, a US initiative promoting democracy and development in Latin America. Moscoso argued that while Arévalo was a member of the democratic left, he was not a Communist and posed no greater threat than other non-Communist democratic leftist figures such as Venezuelan President Rómulo Betancourt and Puerto Rican Governor Luis Muñoz Marín, who also implemented progressive reforms during their reign. Despite the internal opposition to the idea however, the "coup bloc" still prevailed, leading to Colonel Enrique Peralta Azurdia's successful coup.

== Coup ==
The Anti-Arevalist coup, aiming to prevent former President Juan José Arévalo from taking power again, (1945–1951) was mainly executed by two army garrisons in the nation's capital of Guatemala City - Guardia De Honor and Mariscal Zavala - and led by two military figures: Colonel Enrique Peralta Azuria, Minister of Defence during the Ydígoras administration, and Colonel Catalino Chavez, First Presidential Designate. The bloodless coup attempt started unfolding on March 26, with the declaration of a State of Siege which suspended constitutional protections. Three days later on March 29, the Defense Minister Peralta Azurdia announced the closure of the national airport and prohibition of any public meetings, adding that "military maneuvers" would be conducted in and out of Guatemala City from March 30 until March 31. As announced, the coup attempt was finally launched in the late hours of March 30, with gunfire being heard through the streets of the capital by 8 PM. On 6 AM of the following day, the army broadcast a radio announcement to the radio declaring the president had been overthrown and that Colonel Enrique Peralta Azurdia would assume leadership "for the good of the nation." Constitutional rights were promised to be restored once "the nation is ready" and "the extremists have been eradicated."

== Post-coup ==
On March 30, 1964, the military junta lifted the State of Siege which had been in effect since the coup, also announcing Constituent Assembly elections for May 24. Two political parties were permitted to participate: the centre-left Revolutionary Party and the right-wing National Liberation Movement. In 1965, a new constitution was approved. On March 6, general elections were held, which were won by Julio César Méndez Montenegro. By July 1, the military peacefully relinquished power to the new civilian administration.
