= 1970 Guatemalan general election =

- 1 March 1970
- Presidential election
- Turnout: 53.82%
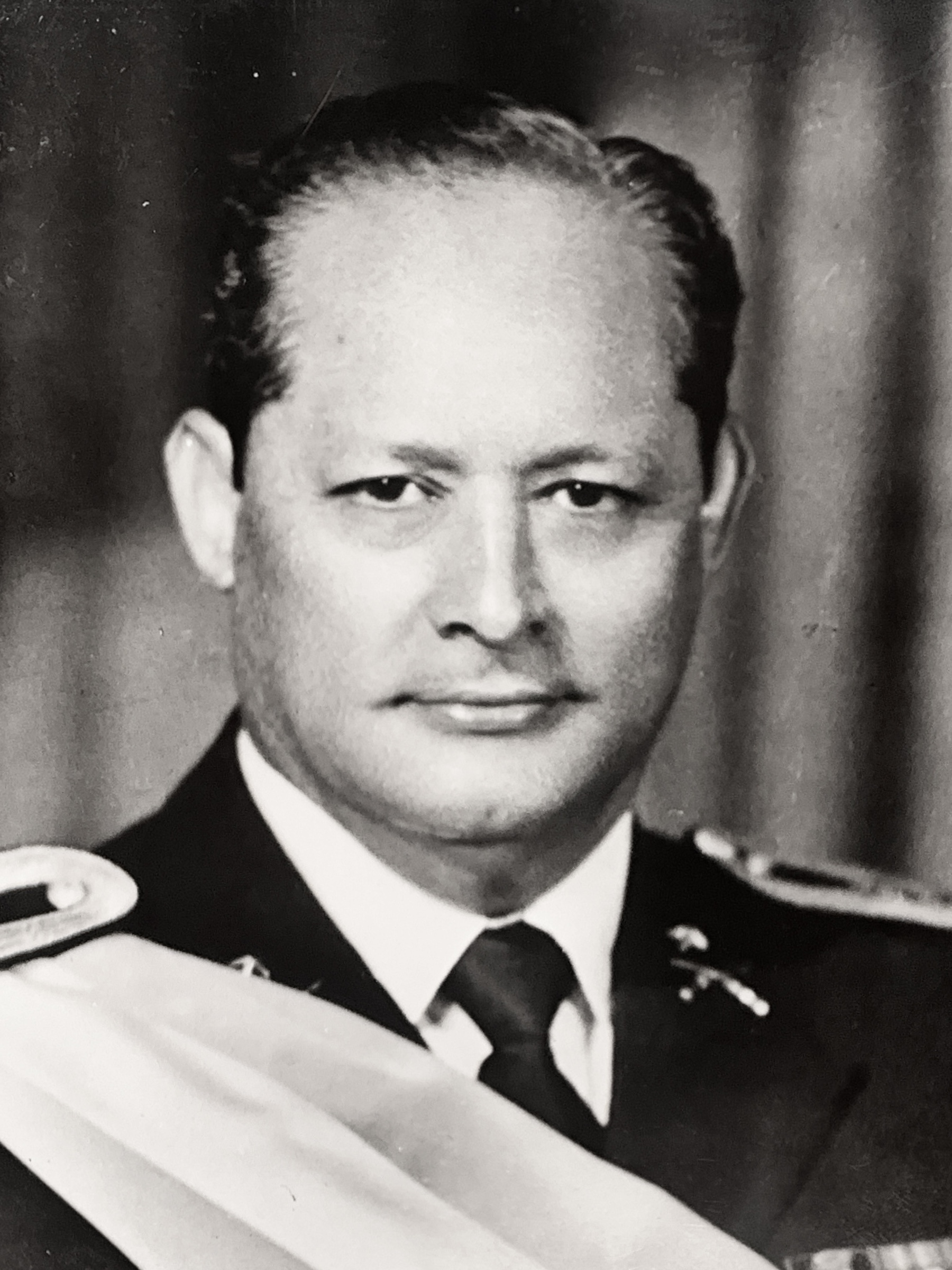

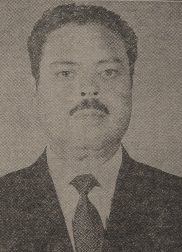
Nominee	Carlos Arana Osorio	Mario Fuentes Pieruccini
Party	MLN	Revolutionary
Running mate	Eduardo Cáceres	Óscar Castañeda
Electoral vote	37	17
Popular vote	251,135	202,241
Percentage	43.35%	34.91%
President before election
Julio Méndez
Revolutionary
President-elect
Carlos Arana
MLN

General elections were held in Guatemala on 1 March 1970. No candidate received over 50% of the vote in the presidential election, resulting in Carlos Manuel Arana Osorio being elected by Congress on 21 March by a vote of 37 to 17. The National Liberation Movement–Institutional Democratic Party alliance also won the Congressional elections. Voter turnout was 54% in the presidential election and 53% in the Congressional elections.

== Results ==
=== President ===
Candidate	Party	Popular vote		Congress vote	
Candidate	Party	Votes	%	Votes	%
Carlos Manuel Arana Osorio	MLN–PID	251,135	43.35	37	68.52
Mario Fuentes Pieruccini	Revolutionary Party	202,241	34.91	17	31.48
Jorge Lucas Caballeros	Guatemalan Christian Democracy	125,948	21.74		
Total		579,324	100.00	54	100.00
Valid votes		579,324	90.42		
Invalid/blank votes		61,360	9.58		
Total votes		640,684	100.00		
Registered voters/turnout		1,190,449	53.82	55	–
Source: Nohlen

=== Congress ===
Party	Votes	%	Seats	+/–
MLN–PID	231,528	41.71	31	+5
Revolutionary Party	201,119	36.24	19	–10
Guatemalan Christian Democracy	122,379	22.05	0	New
Total	555,026	100.00	50	0
Valid votes	555,026	87.55		
Invalid/blank votes	78,953	12.45		
Total votes	633,979	100.00		
Registered voters/turnout	1,190,449	53.26		
Source: Nohlen

== Bibliography ==
- Guía del organismo legislativo República de Guatemala. Preparada por el Instituto Nacional de Administración para el Desarrollo, Dobierno de la República. 1968.
- Villagrán Kramer, Francisco. Biografía política de Guatemala: años de guerra y años de paz. FLACSO-Guatemala, 2004.
- Political handbook of the world 1970. New York, 1971.
