= 1966 Guatemalan general election =

- 6 March 1966
- Presidential election
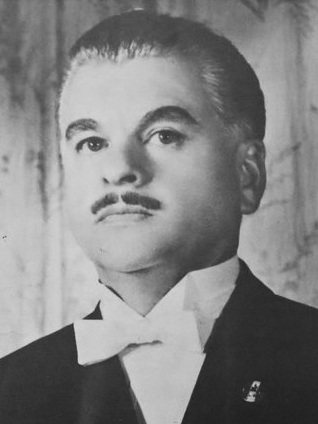

Nominee	Julio Méndez	Juan Aguilar
Party	Revolutionary	PID
Running mate	Clemente Marroquín	Gustavo Mirón Porras
Electoral vote	35	19
Popular vote	209,204	148,025
Percentage	44.78%	31.68
President before election
Enrique Peralta Azurdia
President-elect
Julio Méndez
Revolutionary

General elections were held in Guatemala on 6 March 1966. After no candidate received 50% or more of the national vote, Julio César Méndez Montenegro was elected President by Congress on 5 May. In the Congressional elections, the Revolutionary Party won 28 of the 54 seats. Voter turnout was 56.27% in the presidential election and 55.01% in the Congressional elections. Despite historical odds he faced, left-of-centre Méndez, a former law professor who held the rank of civilian, would be successfully be elected and sworn in as President of Guatemala, which had at this point been long led by military government since its independence in 1847.

== Results ==
=== President ===
Candidate	Party	Popular vote		Congress vote	
Candidate	Party	Votes	%	Votes	%
Julio César Méndez Montenegro	Revolutionary Party	209,204	44.78	35	64.81
Juan de Dios Aguilar de León	Institutional Democratic Party	148,025	31.68	19	35.19
Miguel Angel Ponciano	National Liberation Movement	109,981	23.54		
Total		467,210	100.00	54	100.00
Valid votes		467,210	87.94	54	100.00
Invalid/blank votes		64,060	12.06	0	0.00
Total votes		531,270	100.00	54	100.00
Registered voters/turnout		944,170	56.27	55	98.18
Source: Nohlen, Dombrowski

=== Congress ===
Party	Votes	%	Seats	+/–
Revolutionary Party	192,366	44.07	29	+23
Institutional Democratic Party	138,873	31.81	21	New
National Liberation Movement	105,306	24.12	5	+5
Total	436,545	100.00	55	–11
Valid votes	436,545	84.05		
Invalid/blank votes	82,848	15.95		
Total votes	519,393	100.00		
Registered voters/turnout	944,170	55.01		
Source: Nohlen

== Bibliography ==
- Guía del organismo legislativo República de Guatemala. Preparada por el Instituto Nacional de Administración para el Desarrollo, Dobierno de la República. 1968.
- Villagrán Kramer, Francisco. Biografía política de Guatemala: años de guerra y años de paz. FLACSO-Guatemala, 2004.
