= Institutional Democratic Party =

Institutional Democratic Party Partido Institucional Democrático
- President: Fernando Romeo Lucas García (last)
- Founder: Enrique Peralta Azurdia
- Founded: September 1964
- Dissolved: January 12, 1996
- Merged into: Guatemalan Republican Front
- Headquarters: Guatemala City
- Ideology: Civic nationalism Conservatism
- Political position: Centre-right
- Colors: Green, yellow

The Institutional Democratic Party (Spanish: Partido Institucional Democrático, PID) was a Guatemalan pro-government political party active during the 1970s.

The PID was formed in 1964 by Enrique Peralta Azurdia after he had seized power in a coup. A centre-right party, it was modelled on the Mexican Institutional Revolutionary Party. From the onset the party was dominated by the country's military elite. Despite this the party maintained close links with individual civilian parties during its existence, with their civilian allies often outnumbering them in the Assembly.

The PID was first tested in the 1966 general election when the leader of the Revolutionary Party of Guatemala, Mario Mendez Montenegro agreed to support the PID. However he died not long before the vote and his brother Julio César Méndez Montenegro took over in his place. A supporter of reform, he split from the PID and won the election overwhelmingly. However his Presidency was blighted by violence from the far-right National Liberation Movement (MLN) and the PID formed an alliance with this group for the 1970 election, resulting in the success of their candidate Carlos Manuel Arana Osorio.

In the 1974 general election they were again supported by the MLN and their joint candidate Kjell Eugenio Laugerud García secured the Presidency. However this election saw cracks appear in the PID as all three candidates were leading military officers who would thus have been expected to support the party. These became more acute following the 1976 Guatemala earthquake at a time when Laugerud was involved in a feud with Arana Osorio over control of the National Reconstruction Committee. Ultimately Laugerud put a block on Arana Osorio's activity by bringing one of his closest aides to trial for organising death squads, despite the fact that Laugerud had been involved in the same practice.

In the 1978 general election the PID aligned with the Revolutionary Party to secure the election of Fernando Romeo Lucas García. However, after this victory internal divisions within the party continued to escalate, whilst from the outside the business community began to grow as more vocal critics, particularly over the issue of PID operatives using their positions to enrich themselves. When plans to rig upcoming elections for the PID candidate came to light the military opposition took action by overthrowing Lucas Garcia and installing Efraín Ríos Montt as President. As a result, a new generation of young officers replaced the old and the PID did not continue in government after the coup.

The party won five seats in the Constituent Assembly elections in 1984. For the 1985 elections, the PID and MLN renewed their alliance and backed Mario Sandoval Alarcón as presidential candidate, finishing fourth in the presidential race while becoming the third largest block in Congress.

A rump PID emerged in 1990 when it merged with the Guatemalan Republican Front (FRG) and the National Unity Front to run for election as the No Sell-Out Platform, although this alliance quickly became dominated by the FRG.
