= 1964 Guatemalan Constitutional Assembly election =

Constitutional Assembly elections were held on 24 May 1964. The Movement of National Liberation and the Revolutionary Party both won ten seats, although sixty members were appointed by the military government (and formed the Institutional Democratic Party in September).

== Results ==
| Party | Votes | % | Seats |
|---|---|---|---|
| National Liberation Movement | 142,248 | 48.48 | 10 |
| Revolutionary Party | 122,374 | 41.70 | 10 |
| MLN–PRG dissidents | 28,818 | 9.82 | 0 |
| Military government appointees | | | 60 |
| Total | 293,440 | 100.00 | 80 |
| Valid votes | 293,440 | 87.12 | |
| Invalid/blank votes | 43,383 | 12.88 | |
| Total votes | 336,823 | 100.00 | |
Source: Nohlen (votes)

== Bibliography ==
- Villagrán Kramer, Francisco. Biografía política de Guatemala: años de guerra y años de paz. FLACSO-Guatemala, 2004.
- Political handbook and Atlas of the world 1964. New York, 1965.
- Elections in the Americas A Data Handbook Volume 1. North America, Central America, and the Caribbean. Edited by Dieter Nohlen. 2005.
