= 1978 Guatemalan general election =

- 5 March 1978
- Presidential election
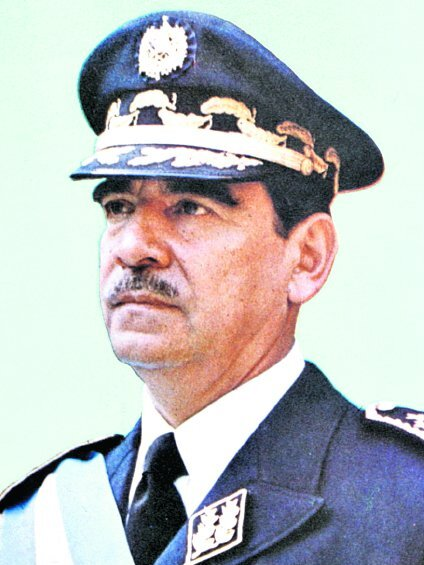

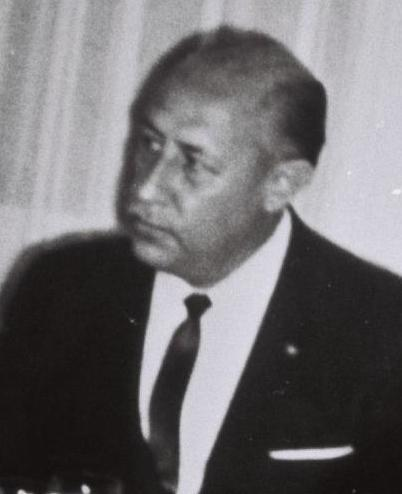
Nominee	Romeo Lucas	Enrique Peralta
Party	PID	MLN
Running mate	Francisco Villagrán	Héctor Aragón
Electoral vote	35	0
Popular vote	262,960	221,223
Percentage	40.33%	33.93%
President before election
Kjell Laugerud García
MLN
President-elect
Fernando Romeo Lucas
PID–PR–CAO

General elections were held in Guatemala on 5 March 1978. No candidate received more than 50% of the vote in the presidential election, resulting in Fernando Romeo Lucas García being elected president by Congress with 35 votes, amidst an opposition boycott. The Congressional elections were won by the National Liberation Movement.

== Results ==
=== President ===
Candidate	Party	Popular vote		Congress vote	
Candidate	Party	Votes	%	Votes	%
Fernando Romeo Lucas García	PID–PR–CAO	262,960	40.33	35	100.00
Enrique Peralta Azurdia	National Liberation Movement	221,223	33.93		
Ricardo Peralta Méndez	DCG–PRA	167,890	25.75		
Total		652,073	100.00	35	100.00
Valid votes				35	100.00
Invalid/blank votes				0	0.00
Total votes				35	100.00
Registered voters/turnout		1,785,764	–	60	58.33
Source: Nohlen, ISLA

=== Congress ===
Party	Seats	+/–
National Liberation Movement	20	+4
Institutional Democratic Party	17	+3
Revolutionary Party	14	+4
Guatemalan Christian Democracy	7	–
Central Aranista Organization	3	–3
Total	61	+1
Source: Nohlen

== Bibliography ==
- Villagrán Kramer, Francisco. Biografía política de Guatemala: años de guerra y años de paz. FLACSO-Guatemala, 2004.
- Political handbook of the world 1978. New York, 1979.
