= 1974 Guatemalan general election =

- 3 March 1974
- Presidential election
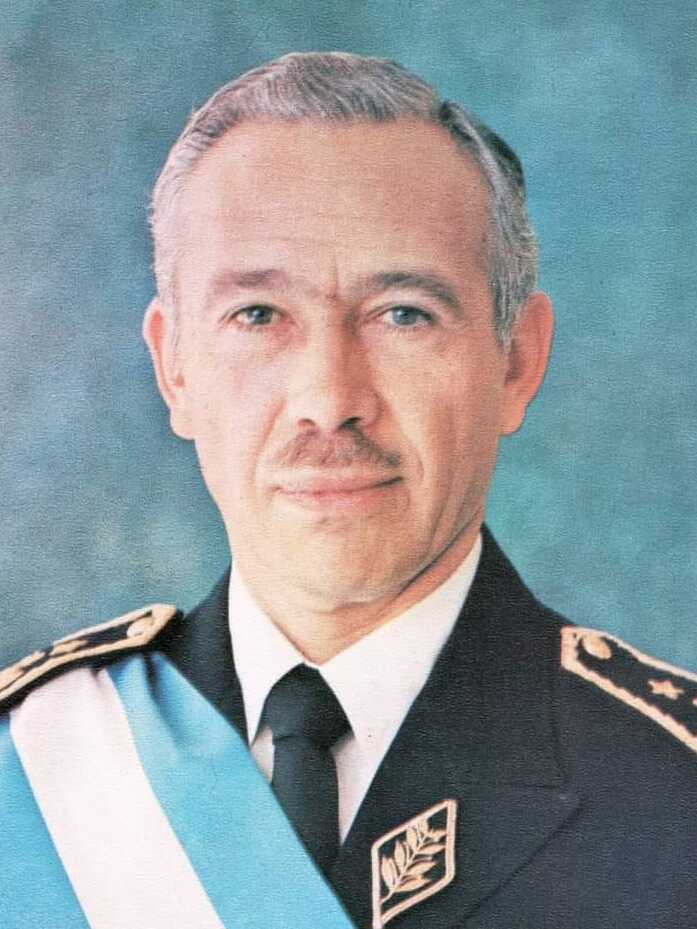

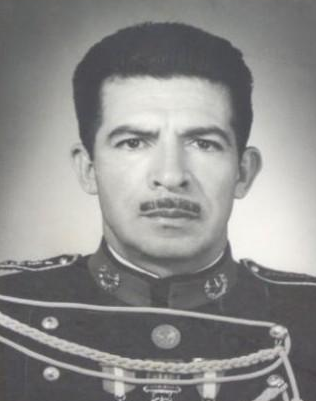
Nominee	Kjell Laugerud	Efraín Ríos Montt
Party	PID	DCG
Running mate	Mario Sandoval	Alberto Fuentes
Electoral vote	32	0
Popular vote	298,953	228,067
Percentage	44.61%	34.03%
President before election
Carlos Arana Osorio
PID
President-elect
Kjell Laugerud García
PID

General elections were held in Guatemala on 3 March 1974. The ruling Institutional Democratic Party's presidential candidate was General Kjell Eugenio Laugerud García, an army officer whose running mate was Mario Sandoval Alarcón, the long-time leader of the far-right National Liberation Movement. The National Opposition Front's candidate was also an army officer, General Efraín Ríos Montt, whose running mate was economist Alberto Fuentes Mohr. The National Opposition Front was a coalition of the Guatemalan Christian Democracy, Fuentes's Social Democratic Party, and the Authentic Revolutionary Party.

After the National Opposition Front led the first counts on election night, the government stopped releasing further updates and several days later declared that Laugerud had won by about 71,000 votes. According to many independent observers, this result was fraudulent, and Ríos had actually received a clear majority of the votes. Since none of the presidential candidates were reported as having obtaining more than 50% of the popular vote, the election was ultimately decided by the government-controlled National Congress, which chose Laugerud by a vote of 38 to 2, with 15 opposition deputies abstaining.

Soon after the election, General Ríos was posted as military attaché to Guatemala's embassy in Madrid. The Congressional elections were also won by the alliance of Laugerud's Institutional Democratic Party and Sandoval's National Liberation Movement.

== Results ==
=== President ===
Candidate	Party	Popular vote		Congress vote	
Candidate	Party	Votes	%	Votes	%
Kjell Eugenio Laugerud García	PID–MLN	298,953	44.61	32	100.00
Efraín Ríos Montt	National Opposition Front	228,067	34.03	0	0.00
Ernesto Paíz Novales	Revolutionary Party	143,111	21.36		
Total		670,131	100.00	32	100.00
Valid votes		670,131	92.15		
Invalid/blank votes		57,059	7.85		
Total votes		727,190	100.00		
Registered voters/turnout		1,566,724	46.41	55	–
Source: Nohlen (popular vote)

=== Congress ===
Party	Seats	+/–
National Liberation Movement	16	–
Institutional Democratic Party	14	–
National Opposition Front	14	+14
Revolutionary Party	10	–9
Central Aranista Organisation	6	New
Total	60	+5
Source: Nohlen

== Bibliography ==
- Guía del organismo legislativo República de Guatemala. Preparada por el Instituto Nacional de Administración para el Desarrollo, Dobierno de la República. 1968.
- Villagrán Kramer, Francisco. Biografía política de Guatemala: años de guerra y años de paz. FLACSO-Guatemala, 2004.
- Political handbook of the world 1974. New York, 1975.
