= 1984 Guatemalan Constitutional Assembly election =

Constitutional Assembly elections were held in Guatemala on 1 July 1984. Although the Guatemalan Christian Democracy received the most votes, an alliance of the National Liberation Movement and Nationalist Authentic Centre emerged as the largest bloc with 23 of the 88 seats. Voter turnout was 78%.

== Results ==
Party	National			District			Total seats
Party	Votes	%	Seats	Votes	%	Seats	Total seats
Guatemalan Christian Democracy	326,064	21.23	6	261,207	16.82	14	20
National Centre Union	273,744	17.83	5	278,740	17.95	16	21
MLN–CAN	249,712	16.26	5	260,466	16.77	18	23
Revolutionary Party	146,092	9.51	2	179,199	11.54	8	10
National Renewal Party	133,680	8.71	2	126,021	8.11	3	5
Institutional Democratic Party	106,188	6.92	2	109,905	7.08	3	5
Anti-Communist Unification Party	61,116	3.98	1	53,385	3.44	0	1
United Front of the Revolution	45,677	2.97	0	45,490	2.93	0	0
Emerging Movement of Harmony	42,764	2.78	0	43,753	2.82	0	0
National Unity Front	40,488	2.64	0	47,366	3.05	1	1
Democratic Action	28,347	1.85	0	36,747	2.37	0	0
Democratic Civic Front	28,040	1.83	0	27,928	1.80	0	0
Democratic Party of National Cooperation	25,238	1.64	0	18,544	1.19	0	0
Progressive Party	14,354	0.93	0	14,686	0.95	0	0
FDP–CND	14,050	0.91	0	13,376	0.86	0	0
DCG–PNR				14,762	0.95	1	1
Rural Organization of Social Action				12,222	0.79	1	1
Progressive National Alliance				6,766	0.44	0	0
United Zacapa Committee				2,731	0.18	0	0
Total	1,535,554	100.00	23	1,553,294	100.00	65	88
Valid votes	1,535,554	76.97		1,553,294	77.96		
Invalid/blank votes	459,379	23.03		439,120	22.04		
Total votes	1,994,933	100.00		1,992,414	100.00		
Registered voters/turnout	2,554,002	78.11		2,554,002	78.01		
Source: Nohlen

== Bibliography ==
- Villagrán Kramer, Francisco. Biografía política de Guatemala: años de guerra y años de paz. FLACSO-Guatemala, 2004.
- Political handbook of the world 1984. New York, 1985.
