= 1985 Guatemalan general election =

- Presidential election
- 3 November 1985 (first round); 8 December 1985 (second round)
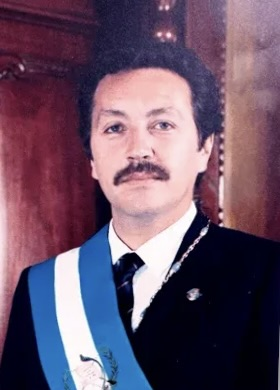

Nominee	Vinicio Cerezo	Jorge Carpio Nicolle
Party	DCG	National Centre Union
Running mate	Roberto Carpio	Ramiro de León Carpio
Popular vote	1,133,517	542,306
Percentage	68.37%	31.63%
President before election
Óscar Humberto Mejía Victores
President-elect
Vinicio Cerezo
DCG

General elections were held in Guatemala on 3 November 1985, with a second round of the presidential elections taking place on 8 December. The presidential election resulted in a victory for Vinicio Cerezo, who had received $650,000 towards his campaign from media owner Remigio Ángel González. The Congressional elections resulted in a victory for Cerezo's Guatemalan Christian Democracy, which won 51 of the 100 seats. Voter turnout was 69.3%.

== Results ==
=== President ===
Candidate	Party	First round		Second round	
Candidate	Party	Votes	%	Votes	%
Vinicio Cerezo	Guatemalan Christian Democracy	648,803	38.64	1,133,517	68.37
Jorge Carpio Nicolle	National Centre Union	339,695	20.23	524,306	31.63
Jorge Serrano Elías	PRG–PCDN	231,423	13.78		
Mario Sandoval Alarcón	MLN–PID	210,966	12.56		
Mario David García Velásquez	Nationalist Authentic Centre	105,540	6.29		
Mario Solórzano Martínez	Democratic Social Party	57,368	3.42		
Alejandro Maldonado	National Renewal Party	52,949	3.15		
Lionel Sisniega Otero Barrios	PUA–MEC–FUN	32,256	1.92		
Total		1,679,000	100.00	1,657,823	100.00
Valid votes		1,679,000	88.01	1,657,823	92.08
Invalid/blank votes		228,771	11.99	142,501	7.92
Total votes		1,907,771	100.00	1,800,324	100.00
Registered voters/turnout		2,753,572	69.28	2,753,572	65.38
Source: Nohlen, Rosón

=== Congress ===
Party	National			District			Total seats
Party	Votes	%	Seats	Votes	%	Seats	Total seats
Guatemalan Christian Democracy	648,803	38.64	11	575,785	34.59	40	51
National Centre Union	339,695	20.23	5	342,742	20.59	17	22
PDCN–PRG	231,423	13.78	4	225,246	13.53	7	11
MLN–PID	210,966	12.56	3	254,276	15.27	9	12
Nationalist Authentic Centre	105,540	6.29	1	104,374	6.27	0	1
Democratic Social Party	57,368	3.42	1	60,946	3.66	1	2
National Renewal Party	52,949	3.15	0	70,514	4.24	1	1
PUA–MEC–FUN	32,256	1.92	0	27,234	1.64	0	0
Democratic Civic Front				3,631	0.22	0	0
Total	1,679,000	100.00	25	1,664,748	100.00	75	100
Valid votes	1,679,000	88.01		1,664,748	87.42		
Invalid/blank votes	228,771	11.99		239,488	12.58		
Total votes	1,907,771	100.00		1,904,236	100.00		
Registered voters/turnout	2,753,272	69.29		2,753,272	69.16		
Source: Nohlen

== Bibliography ==
- Villagrán Kramer, Francisco. Biografía política de Guatemala: años de guerra y años de paz. FLACSO-Guatemala, 2004.
- Political handbook of the world 1978. New York, 1979.
