= Mario Méndez Montenegro =

Assassinated first elected mayor of Guatemala City

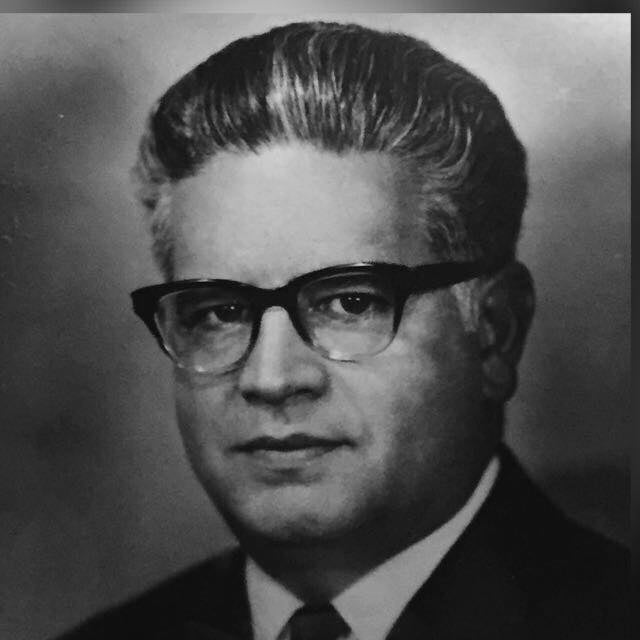

Mayor of Guatemala City
- In office 1946–1949
- Preceded by: Carlos Irigoyen
- Succeeded by: Marco Antonio Villamar

Personal details
- Born: 30 November 1910 Chiquimulilla, Guatemala
- Died: 31 October 1965 (aged 54) Guatemala City
- Party: Popular Liberation Front Party (FLP), Revolutionary Party (PR)

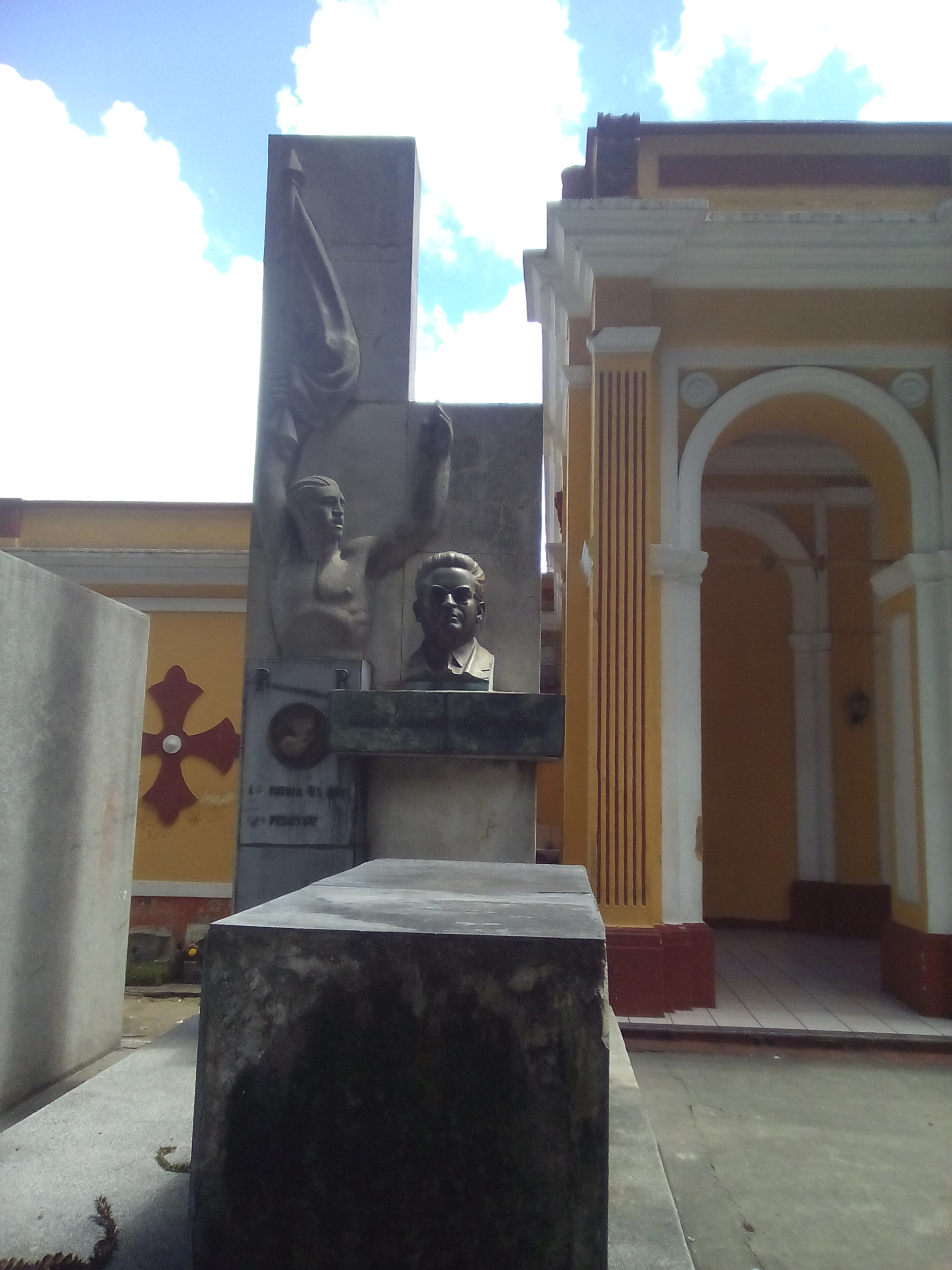
Grave of Mario Méndez in the Guatemala City General Cemetery

Mario Méndez Montenegro (30 November 1910 – 31 October 1965) was a politician, co-founder of the Partido Revolucionario, and first elected mayor of Guatemala City. He was a brother to the president who took office in 1966, Julio César Méndez Montenegro.

== Early life and education ==
Méndez was born in Chiquimulilla, Santa Rosa, on 30 November 1910. He graduated as a lawyer in the national university of Nicaragua (Spanish: Universidad Nacional de Nicaragua).

== Career ==
He was a founder of the Popular Liberation Front Party (Spanish: Partido Frente Popular Libertador, FLP), which supported future president Juan José Arévalo. It later became the Revolutionary Party (Spanish: Partido Revolucionario, PR) and Méndez became its presidential candidate.

=== Death ===
He was prevented from participating in the elections because he was assassinated with gunfire on 31 October 1965.

== See also ==
- César Montenegro Paniagua
- Julio César Méndez Montenegro
- Nineth Montenegro
- Guatemalan Civil War
