= Roberto Herrera Ibarguen =

Guatemalan politician

Roberto Herrera Ibarguen (11 October 1921 – 2 January 2015) was a Guatemalan politician. He served as board member for the Movimiento de Liberación Nacional. He served as constituent deputy, vice president of the State Council, and member of the National Commission on Affairs of Belize and Minister of the Interior

== Biography ==
Roberto Herrera Ibarguen was a member of the prominent Herrera Ibarguen family, Guatemalan industrials and landowners. On 3 January 1978, he was kidnapped and held hostage for nearly four weeks by the Ejército Guerrillero de los Pobres (EGP), who accused him of being the founder of the "death squads" of killing nine guerrilla leaders in 1972 and of repressing the teachers' strike of 1973. They demanded between Q2 million and Q3.5 million and the release of the commander Genaro. He was released after the kidnappers' demands were met, on 30 January 1978, at km 70 of the Pan American Highway.

He was later a foreign minister, working on the Belize Situation. He died on 2 January 2015 at the age of 93.

== See also ==
- List of kidnappings
- List of solved missing person cases
