= Enrique Peralta Azurdia =

Guatemalan military officer and politician

Colonel Enrique Peralta Azurdia
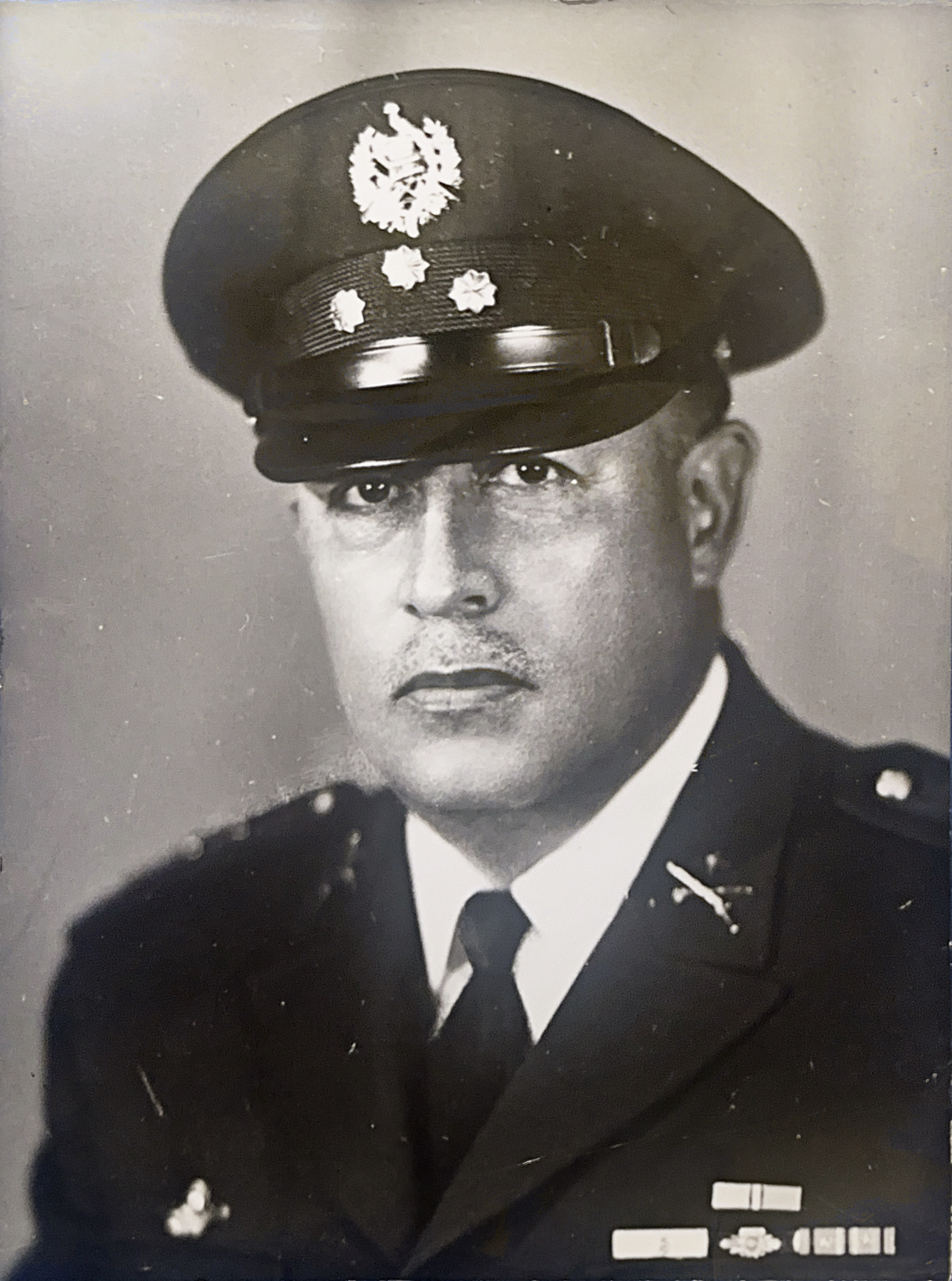
- Formal portrait, c. 1964

Head of Government and Prime Minister of Guatemala
- In office March 31, 1963 – July 1, 1966
- Preceded by: Miguel Ydígoras Fuentes
- Succeeded by: Julio César Méndez

Personal details
- Born: June 17, 1908 Guatemala City, Guatemala
- Died: February 18, 1997 (aged 88) Florida, United States
- Party: Institutional Democratic Party
- Other political affiliations: National Liberation Movement

Military service
- Allegiance: Guatemala
- Branch/service: Guatemalan Army
- Rank: Colonel

Alfredo Enrique Peralta Azurdia (June 17, 1908 – February 18, 1997) was a Guatemalan military officer and politician who served as the Head of Government from March 1963 to July 1966. He took over the office of the presidency after staging a coup d'état against President Miguel Ydígoras Fuentes, under whom he served as Agriculture (1959–1960) and Defense minister (1961–1963).

Peralta would later form the Institutional Democratic Party, a pro-military governing party modeled on the Institutional Revolutionary Party, which dominated Guatemalan politics until 1982. In the 1978 general election, he was the candidate of the National Liberation Movement but was defeated by Fernando Romeo Lucas García.

== Biography ==
=== Early life and education ===
Peralta was born on June 17, 1908, in Guatemala City. He studied at the Escuela Politécnica and enlisted in the Guatemalan Army in 1926.

=== Career ===
Peralta served as a military attaché for the embassies of Mexico, Chile, Costa Rica, El Salvador and the United States, and was later promoted to a plenipotentiary to Cuba, El Salvador and Costa Rica.

In 1958, Peralta became the Director General of Agricultural Affairs under Miguel Ydígoras Fuentes's government, a position he served until 1959. From 1959 to 1960, Peralta was the Minister of Agriculture, and from 1961 to 1963, was the Minister of Defence.

=== Coup d'état and rise to power ===
On March 31, 1963, Peralta came to power via a coup d'état, overthrowing Ydígoras. However, Ydígoras was not the main target of the coup. Fearing the country would be overtaken by "communists", Peralta's coup also targeted the former left-wing president Juan José Arévalo, who had announced his candidacy for the upcoming elections and was coming back to Guatemala from exile.

=== Head of Government ===
After coming to power, Peralta suspended the Constitution, dissolved the Congress, and banned the Communist Party (PGT). However, in 1964, a year after he became head of government, Peralta ended press censorship and lifted the state of emergency. The same year, Peralta called for constituent elections where only two groups could contest: the National Liberation Movement (MLN) and the Revolutionary Party (PR).

Peralta's government continued its repressive activities against left-wing rebels in the Guatemalan Civil War. His government funded the creation of "death squads", which was in charge of eliminating dissidents. Another notable event occurred on March 3 and 5, 1966, when the G-2 (military intelligence) and the Judicial Police raided three houses in Guatemala City, capturing twenty-eight trade unionists and members of the PGT. The twenty-eight "disappeared" while in the custody of the security force, marking it one of the largest forced disappearances in Latin American history.

In 1965, a new Constitution of Guatemala was approved, and general elections were held on March 6, 1966, contested by the Peralta's Institutional Democratic Party (PID), and the PR. The PR candidate Julio César Méndez Montenegro won, and Peralta peacefully handed power to Méndez on July 1.

=== Later life and death ===
Peralta unsuccessfully contested the 1978 elections as a candidate for the MLN. He died on February 18, 1997, in Miami, Florida.

Government offices
Preceded by Miguel Ydígoras	Head of Government of Guatemala; 1963–1966	Succeeded by Julio César Méndez
