= Movement of National Liberation =

The Movement of National Liberation (Spanish: Movimiento de Liberación Nacional) (MLN) was a Mexican leftist political party composed of numerous socialist, Marxist, and peasant activist groups. They operated primarily between 1961 and 1964.

== Foundation ==
The roots of the MLN lay in the Committee to Promote Peace (CIP), founded in July 1959 by Lázaro Cárdenas. From the CIP came the Provisional Committee for National Sovereignty and Economic Emancipation (CLSNEEP), whose goal was to organize a local chapter within Mexico. On August 5, 1961, the committee announced the formation of the National Liberation Movement. The MLN stated as its priorities; regime change, release of political prisoners, solidarity with Cuba, municipal autonomy for unions and peasant organizations, opposition presence in Congress, weakened presidentialism, and undermined corporatist control. The founding organizations of the MLN was a composition of leftist Marxist parties, the National Peasant Confederation (CNC), the Confederation of Mexican Workers (CTM), members of the official Institutional Revolutionary Party (Spanish: Partido Revolucionario Institucional) (PRI) party, and the Popular Socialist Party (Spanish: Partido Popular Socialista) (PPS).

== Decline ==
The Popular Socialist Party withdrew in December 1962 after rumors spread the MLN was planning to organize a new peasant movement outside the PRI to push for agrarian reform. In January 1963, Lázaro Cárdenas announced the formation of just such a party, the Central Campesina Independiente (CCI) to attack the PRI's corruption and betrayal of peasant struggles. Following the MLN's refusal to declare itself an official party for election, it was believed the group began a rapid decline. The issue of solidarity with the Cuban Revolution became a stopping point with the government of then President Adolfo López Mateos. In addition the issue of political prisoners, the release of Valentin Campa and Demetrio Vallejo, finally led Mateos to denounce the MLN, stating they had succumbed to communist infiltration. In 1968 the leaders of the MLN were jailed during the popular student movement, signaling the death of the party.

== Notable members ==
Notable members of the Movement of National Liberation included:

- Carlos Salinas de Gortari - Former Mexican president, 1988-1994.
- Gilberto Rincón Gallardo - Former presidential candidate, politician and activist.
- Arnoldo Martínez Verdugo - Politician and former leader of the Mexican Communist Party and of the Unified Socialist Party of Mexico.
- Genaro Vázquez Rojas - Former civic association leader, militant, and guerrilla fighter.
