= National Renewal Party (Guatemala) =

National Renewal Party Partido Nacional Renovador
- Leader: Alejandro Maldonado
- Founded: 1978
- Dissolved: 1990
- Ideology: Liberalism
- Political position: Centre-right
- Colors: Orange

National Renewal Party (Spanish: Partido Nacional Renovador, PNR) was a political party in Guatemala founded in 1978 and dissolved in 1990.
