= César Montenegro Paniagua =

Guatemalan politician

César Montenegro Paniagua (October 1920 – April 1970) was a communist Guatemalan politician, who was assassinated on April 7, 1970. He was born into one of Guatemala's largest and most influential families and was one of twelve children. His father was an army general while his mother was a home maker. He graduated as a teacher but quickly became involved in politics and enthralled with the inequality and poverty in Guatemala. He became involved in Guatemala's first communist party and quickly became a syndicalist.

In 1945 he married hotelier and socialite Maria Dolores Vega Correu (1924–2007), with whom he had three children, Maria Teresa, Francisco and Domingo Rafael.

== Background and death ==
He served as congressman during the Guatemalan presidency of Jacobo Árbenz, who was overthrown in the 1954 Guatemalan coup d'état—a CIA covert operation code-named PBSuccess. According to the CIA, Montenegro said they were going to order the beheading of anticommunists. During the coup, he and his family managed to escape into the embassy of Mexico where they claimed political refuge and went into exile.

After his return to Guatemala with his family, César Montenegro Paniagua was kidnapped, tortured and murdered during Julio César Méndez Montenegro's presidency. It is rumored the assassination was undertaken with presidential sanction. Mendez Montenegro was his first cousin and did not attend the funeral however he did send a funeral wreath.

== Aftermath ==
Domingo Rafael fled Guatemala in the late 80's leaving behind his estranged wife and four children. He moved to Australia where he claimed political asylum, however some may say this claim was undeserved as he was never involved in the political struggle in Guatemala. Maria Dolores arrived in Australia with the aid of Amnesty International in 1992 where she lived out the remainder of her life until 2007 when she lost her battle against dementia and Alzheimer's disease. Maria Teresa and her only daughter Nayeli Maria arrived in Australia in 1993, where they obtained a refugee status because of her involvement with General Benedicto Lucas Garcia, her work with UNICEF, and a paper written about the war-torn area of Xajul. Maria Teresa's involvement in the guerilla remains unclear.

== See also ==
- Julio César Méndez
- List of kidnappings
