= Clemente Marroquín =

Guatemalan journalist and politician

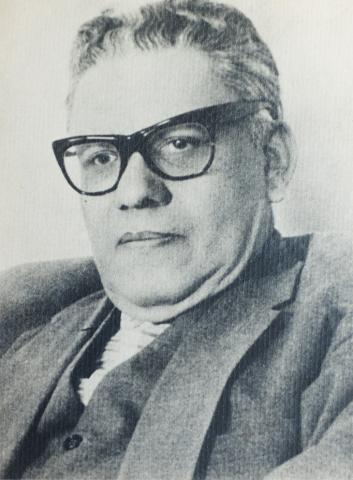
- Official portrait

Vice President of Guatemala
- In office 1 July 1966 – 1 July 1970
- President: Julio César Montenegro
- Preceded by: Catalino Chávez
- Succeeded by: Eduardo Cáceres

Personal details
- Born: 12 August 1897 Jalapa, Guatemala
- Died: 8 April 1978 (aged 80)
- Education: Universidad de San Carlos de Guatemala

Clemente Marroquín Rojas (12 August 1897 – 8 April 1978) was a Guatemalan journalist and politician.

He was elected as Vice President of Guatemala for the period from 1 July 1966 to 1 July 1970 as the running mate of Julio César Méndez. He also served a one-year term as First Vice President from March 1958 to March 1959, elected by Congress that time.

| Preceded by Catalino Chávez | Vice President of Guatemala; 1966-1970 | Succeeded by Eduardo Cáceres |
