= Kjell Eugenio Laugerud García =

36th President of Guatemala from 1974 to 1978

Brigadier General Kjell Eugenio Laugerud García
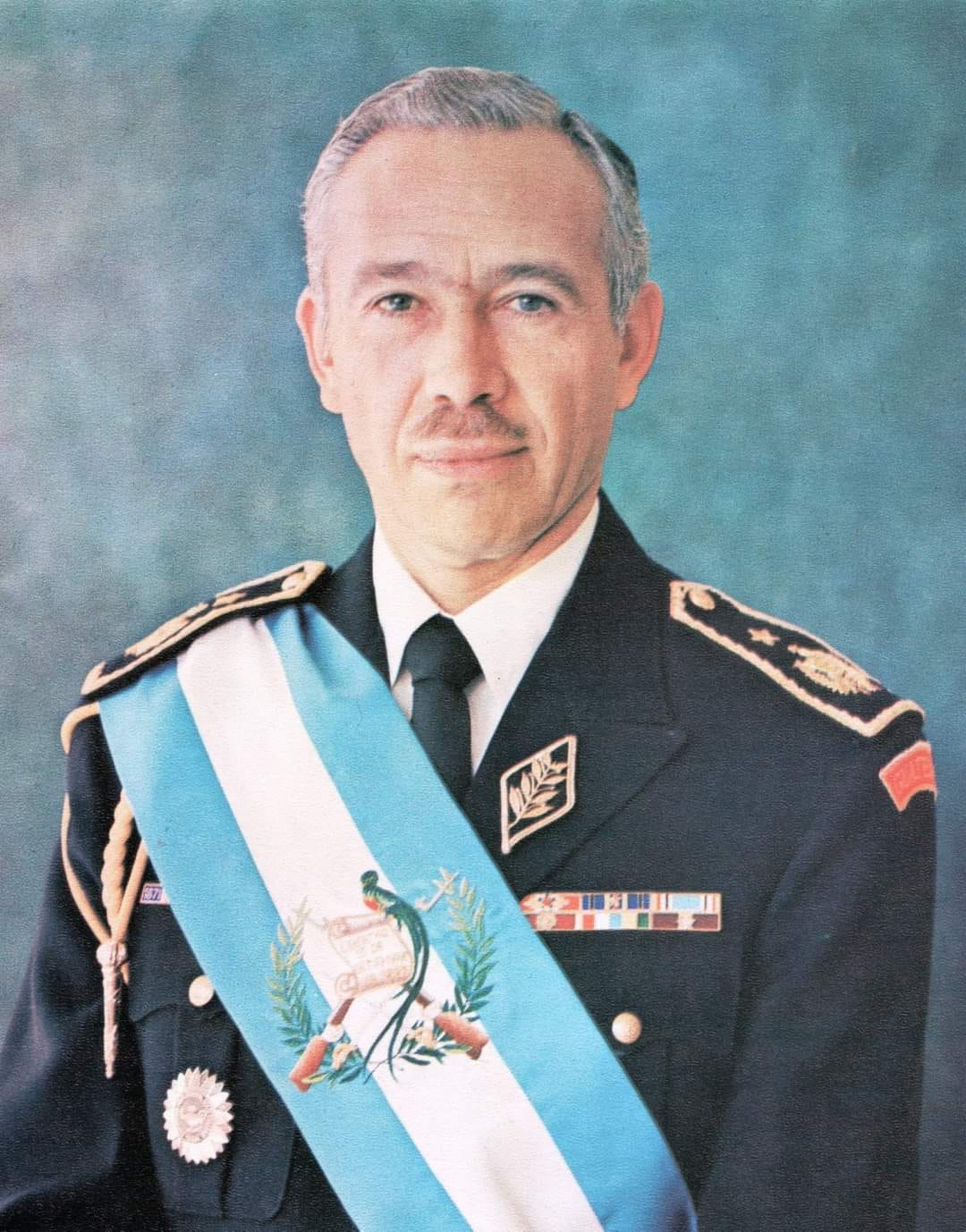
- Official portrait, 1974

36th President of Guatemala
- In office 1 July 1974 – 1 July 1978
- Vice President: Mario Sandoval Alarcón
- Preceded by: Carlos Arana Osorio
- Succeeded by: Romeo Lucas García

Minister of Defence
- In office January 1972 – July 1974
- President: Carlos Arana Osorio
- Preceded by: Leonel Vassaux Martínez
- Succeeded by: Fausto David Rubio Coronado

Personal details
- Born: 24 January 1930 Guatemala City, Guatemala
- Died: 9 December 2009 (aged 79) Guatemala City, Guatemala
- Spouse: Hellen Lossi
- Education: United States Army Command and General Staff College
- Profession: Military officer

Military service
- Allegiance: Guatemala
- Branch/service: Guatemalan Army
- Rank: General

Kjell Eugenio Laugerud García (24 January 1930 – 9 December 2009) was a Guatemalan military officer who served as the 36th president of Guatemala from 1974 until 1978. A member of the National Liberation Movement, he previously served as General Staff of the Army from 1970 to 1972 and Minister of national defence from 1972 to 1973 under President Carlos Arana Osorio.

His presidency, which occurred during the Civil War, was characterized by being more tolerant of the opposition, by his efficient response to the 1976 earthquake and an increase in oil exploitation in the Northern Transversal Strip.

== Early life and career ==
=== Early life ===
Kjell Eugenio Laugerud García was born on 24 January 1930. He was the son of a Norwegian father and a Guatemalan mother.

=== Military career ===
During his military career, Laugerud received part of his training in the United States, attending classes at Fort Benning, Georgia, and at Command and General Staff College, Fort Leavenworth, Kansas. He would hold important positions such as the management of the Polytechnic School, as a delegate to the Inter-American Defense Board between 1968 and 1970, and as the head of the Army General Staff. During the presidency of Carlos Arana Osorio, Laugerud was promoted to general and appointed Minister of Defense.

=== 1974 presidential campaign ===
Laugerud became a candidate for the 1974 general election, running on the endorsement of the National Liberation Movement-Institutional Democratic Party coalition (MLN-PID). In the second round of elections, Laugerud defeated Efraín Ríos Montt, candidate of the Guatemalan Christian Democracy party. However, the results of the election were marred by violence and were challenged by the opposition, which questioned the legitimacy of the electoral process.

== Presidency (1974–1978) ==
Laugerud was sworn in as the 36th president on 1 July 1974, inside the legislative palace. In his inaugural address, he emphasized the need for national harmony and unity to promote the economic and social well-being of the country.

=== Earthquake of 1976 ===
Guatemala was struck with a 7.5-moment magnitude earthquake on 4 February 1976 which generated an unprecedented crisis in the country. Approximately 258,000 homes were destroyed as well as 40% of the national hospital infrastructure. Laugerud García established the National Reconstruction Committee and presented the reconstruction program at a press conference on 18 March 1976. Serious cases of corruption occurred during reconstruction. However, at the end of his government, the infrastructure was recovered and in ten years there were no more vestiges of destruction. In a 1990 interview, Laugerud revealed that he still had nightmares about the earthquake.

=== Civil War ===
==== Massacre of Panzós ====
Just before the end of his term, Laugerud was also faced with the consequences of a massacre of Kekchi Mayan demonstrators by the military in Panzós, in which the Army killed 53 unarmed civilians and another 47 were wounded.

=== Foreign policy ===
During his term, Guatemala had continuing disputes with neighboring Belize. In 1977, after the Carter administration published a report critical of the human rights situation in Guatemala, Laugerud announced that the country would no longer accept U.S. military aid. Guatemala did, receive funds that had already been appropriated for that year and later turned to other nations, such as Israel, Spain, Belgium, Sweden, Taiwan, and Yugoslavia, for military aid and arms supplies.

== Post-presidency ==
In 1983, Laugerud and three other ex-presidents were forced to retire from the Army.

Political offices
Preceded by Carlos Arana	President of Guatemala; 1974–1978	Succeeded by Romeo Lucas García
