= Mario Sandoval Alarcón =

Guatemalan politician (1923–2003)

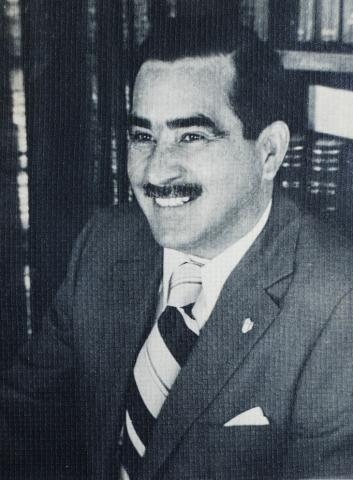
- Official portrait

Vice President of Guatemala
- In office 1 July 1974 – 1 July 1978
- President: Kjell Eugenio Laugerud García
- Preceded by: Eduardo Cáceres
- Succeeded by: Francisco Villagrán Kramer

Personal details
- Born: May 18, 1923 Guatemala City
- Died: April 17, 2003 (aged 79)
- Party: MLN
- Awards: Order of the Sun of Peru

Mario Sandoval Alarcón (May 18, 1923 – April 17, 2003) was a Guatemalan politician who served as vice president of Guatemala from 1974 to 1978 under Kjell Eugenio Laugerud García. A member and founder of the political party, Movimiento de Liberacion Nacional, Sandoval served as President of the Congress from 1970 to 1974.

== Biography ==
He is the founder in 1960 of the Movimiento de Liberación Nacional (MLN) which was a nationalist, anti-communist political party. As part of the MLN, he played a role in the widespread murders committed by the Mano Blanca death squadrons. In 1954, he helped support colonel Carlos Castillo's coup against Jacobo Árbenz. He served as private secretary to Castillo and was a member of the constituent assembly which drafted the constitution of 1966.

He served as President of the Congress from 1970 to 1974, when he was sworn in as the Vice President.

Sandoval served as Vice President from 1 July 1974 to 1 July 1978 during the presidency of Kjell Laugerud. During his time as vicepresident he helped president Kjell after the 1976 earthquake that affected a great part of the country. In 1982, he placed second in that year's presidential election. He was unsuccessful again three years later, in 1985.

Sandoval was a leader of the World Anti-Communist League (WACL). His aversion to communism and methods for fighting against it was passed on to some of his followers, one of whom was Roberto D'Aubuisson, founder of El Salvador's Nationalist Republican Alliance (ARENA) party. He was the undisputed leader of the far-right in Guatemala with a reported private army of 3000 soldiers.

Preceded by Eduardo Cáceres	Vice President of Guatemala; 1974–1978	Succeeded by Francisco Villagrán
