= Carlos Manuel Arana Osorio =

President of Guatemala (1918–2003)

Colonel Carlos Arana Osorio
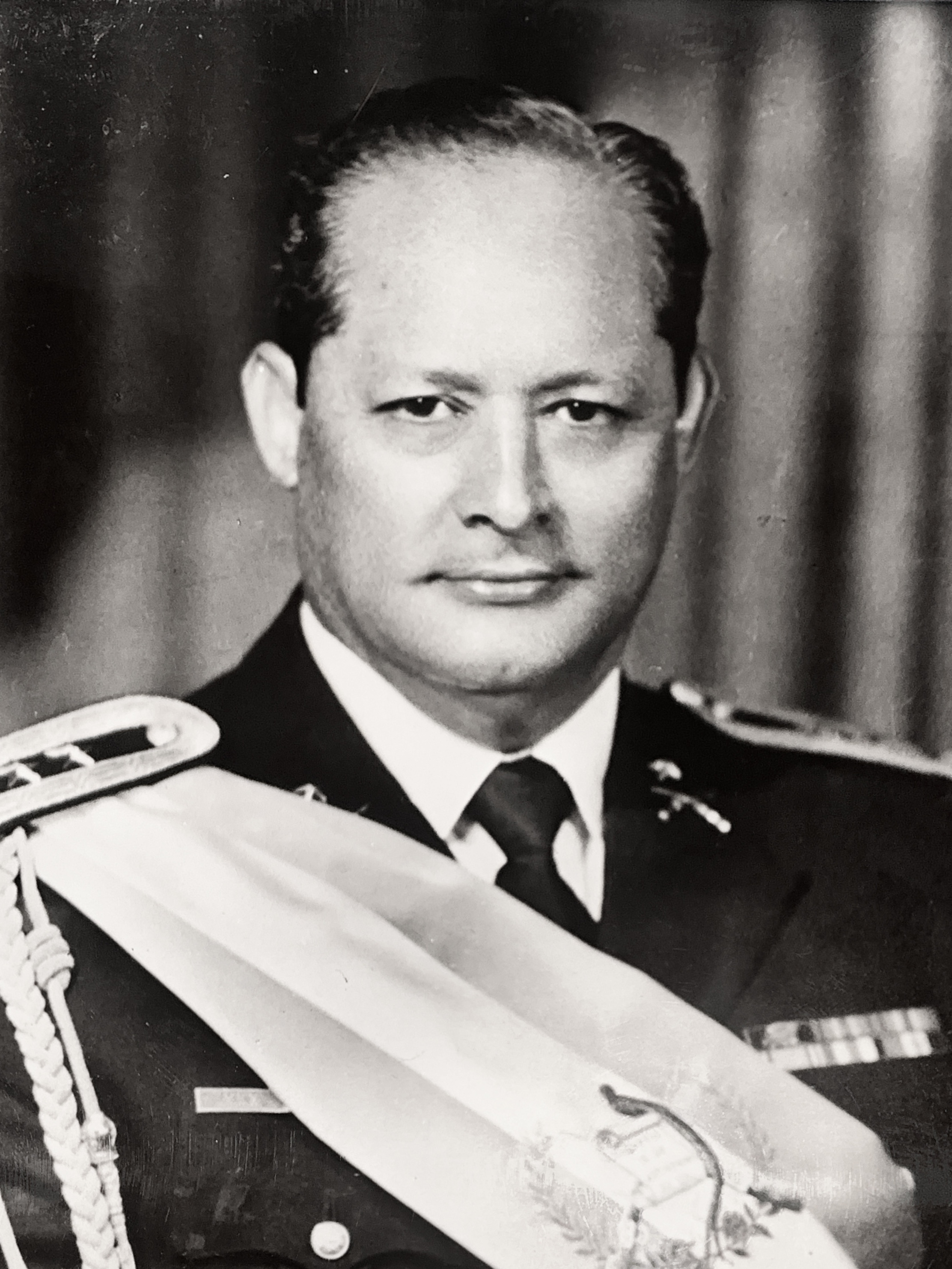
- Official portrait, 1970

35th President of Guatemala
- In office July 1, 1970 – July 1, 1974
- Vice President: Eduardo Cáceres
- Preceded by: Julio Méndez Montenegro
- Succeeded by: Kjell Laugerud García

Personal details
- Born: July 17, 1918 Barberena, Santa Rosa, Guatemala
- Died: December 6, 2003 (aged 85) Guatemala City, Guatemala
- Party: National Liberation Movement
- Spouse: Álida España (died 1993)
- Occupation: Military

Military service
- Allegiance: Guatemala
- Branch/service: Guatemalan Army
- Rank: General

Carlos Manuel Arana Osorio (July 17, 1918 – December 6, 2003) was a military officer and politician who served as the 35th president of Guatemala from 1970 to 1974. A member of the National Liberation Movement, his government enforced torture, disappearances, and killings against political and military adversaries, as well as common criminals.

Arana was born in Barberena, in the department of Santa Rosa. A Colonel in the Army, he oversaw counterinsurgency efforts in Zacapa and Izabal, where thousands were killed by the military from 1966 to 1968. In July 1970, he became president following an electoral process generally considered "non-transparent" on a platform promising a crackdown on law-and-order issues and stability; his vice president was Eduardo Cáceres.

In November 1970, Arana imposed a "State of Siege," followed by heightened counterinsurgency measures. His government committed severe human rights violations and used state terrorism in its war against the guerrillas, including government-sponsored "death squads." Security forces regularly detained, disappeared, tortured, and extrajudicially executed political opponents, student leaders, suspected guerrilla sympathizers, and trade unionists. Arana's government received large-scale military support from the United States, including weapons, technical support, and military advisors. The Guatemalan Human Rights Commission estimated that 20,000 Guatemalans were killed or "disappeared" under the Arana administration.

Carlos Arana, a freemason, was the first of the string of Institutional Democratic Party military rulers who would dominate Guatemalan politics in the 1970s and 1980s (his predecessor, Julio Méndez Montenegro, while dominated by the army, was a civilian). He also served as the ambassador to Nicaragua.

== Early life ==
Arana was born in Barberena, in the department of Santa Rosa, on July 17, 1918. He is the nephew of the former head of the Guatemalan armed forces, Francisco Javier Arana, who was one of the three members of the revolutionary junta that governed Guatemala from 20 October 1944 to 15 March 1945 during the early part of the Guatemalan Revolution. Carlos Arana Osorio joined the military and became an officer. He was also an anti-communist politician and freemason. In 1955, he was appointed director of a Polytechnic School that the government reopened following the 1954 Guatemalan coup d'état.

== Military career ==
In 1964 and 1965, the Guatemalan Armed Forces began engaging in counterinsurgency actions against the MR-13 in eastern Guatemala. In February and March 1964, the Guatemalan Air Force began a selective bombing campaign against MR-13 bases in Izabal, which was followed by counterinsurgency sweeps in the neighboring province of Zacapa under the code-name "Operation Falcon" in September and October 1965. These operations were supplemented by increased U.S. military assistance. Beginning in 1965, the U.S. government sent Green Berets and CIA advisers to instruct the Guatemalan military in counterinsurgency (anti-guerrilla warfare). In addition, U.S. police and "Public Safety" advisers were dispatched to reorganize the urban security structures.

In a clandestine operation in March 1966, a total of thirty Partido Guatemalteco del Trabajo (PGT, Guatemalan Party of Labor) associates were seized, detained, tortured, and executed by the security forces. When law students at the University of San Carlos used legal measures (such as habeas corpus petitions) to require the government to present the detainees in court, some students "disappeared." These "disappearances" became notorious as one of the first significant instances of mass forced disappearance in Latin American history. The use of this tactic was augmented dramatically after the inauguration of President Julio César Méndez Montenegro, who – in a bid to placate and secure the support of the military establishment – gave it carte blanche to engage in "any means necessary" to pacify the country.

With the explicit authorization of the Mendez administration and increased military aid from the United States, the army – accompanied by militarized police units – mounted an extensive pacification effort in the departments of Zacapa and Izabal in October 1966. This campaign, dubbed "Operation Guatemala," was put under the supervision of Colonel Carlos Arana Osorio, with guidance and training from 1,000 US Green Berets.

Under Colonel Arana's jurisdiction and in the city, military strategists armed and fielded various paramilitary death squads to supplement regular army and police units in clandestine terror operations against the FAR's (Rebel Armed Forces, Spanish: Fuerzas Armadas Rebeldes) civilian support base. Personnel, weapons, funds, and operational instructions were supplied to these organizations by the armed forces. The death squads operated with impunity – permitted by the government to kill any civilians deemed to be either insurgents or insurgent collaborators. The paramilitaries or "commissioners" who comprised the clandestine terrorist groups organized by the army were primarily right-wing fanatics with ties to the MLN, founded and led by Mario Sandoval Alarcón, a former participant in the 1954 coup. By 1967, the Guatemalan army claimed to have 1,800 civilian paramilitaries under its direct control. One of the most notorious death squads operating during this period was the MANO, also known as the Mano Blanca ("White Hand"); initially formed by the MLN as a paramilitary front in 1966 to prevent President Méndez Montenegro from taking office, the MANO was quickly taken over by the military and incorporated into the state's counter-terror apparatus. The members of the MANO were primarily army officers, and the organization received funding from wealthy landowners. It also received information from military intelligence.

Observers estimate that government forces killed or "disappeared" as many as 15,000 civilians in three years of the Mendez presidency. Amnesty International cited estimates that 3,000 to 8,000 peasants were killed by the army and paramilitary organizations in Zacapa and Izabal under Colonel Arana between October 1966 and March 1968. Other estimates put the death toll at 15,000 in Zacapa alone during the Mendez period. The victims included guerrilla sympathizers, peasants, labor union leaders, intellectuals, students, and other vaguely defined "enemies of the government." Some observers referred to the policy of the Guatemalan government as "White Terror"—a term previously used to describe similar periods of anti-communist mass killing in countries such as Taiwan and Spain.

The growth of government-sponsored paramilitarism and the government's use of "any means necessary" increased the opposition's resistance level to ensure its survival. The "White Terror" (which led to the destruction of the FAR's Ladino-peasant base in the eastern provinces) caused the MR-13 to retreat to Guatemala City. There, the MR-13 began to engage in selective killings of members of the security forces as well as U.S. military advisors. The insurgents assassinated the American ambassador to Guatemala, John Gordon Mein, in 1968 and the German ambassador to Guatemala, Karl Von Spreti, in 1970.

== Presidency (1970–1974) ==
In July 1970, with support from the Army, Colonel Carlos Arana Osorio assumed the presidency. He was the first of the string of Institutional Democratic Party military rulers who dominated Guatemalan politics in the 1970s and 1980s (his predecessor, Julio César Méndez, was nominally a civilian). Arana had served as the ambassador to Nicaragua during the Somoza regime. In a speech, President Arana stated, "If it is necessary to turn the country into a cemetery in order to pacify it, I will not hesitate to do so." Despite minimal armed insurgent activity then, Osorio imposed a "State of Siege" in November 1970. During the "State of Siege," the Osorio regime imposed a daily curfew from 9:00 PM to 5:00 AM. During that time, all vehicle and pedestrian traffic—including ambulances, fire engines, nurses, and physicians—was forbidden throughout the national territory.

The "State of Siege" was accompanied by increased government repression in the form of abductions, tortures, forced disappearances, and extrajudicial killings. A January 1971 secret bulletin of the U.S. Defense Intelligence Agency detailed how Guatemalan security forces "quietly eliminated" hundreds of suspected "terrorists and bandits" in the Guatemalan countryside. Though repression continued in the countryside, the "White Terror" of the Arana period was mainly urban and directed against the vestiges of the insurgency, which existed primarily in the city. High government sources were cited at the time by foreign journalists as acknowledging 700 executions by security forces or paramilitary death squads in the first two months of the "State of Siege." According to Amnesty International and domestic human rights organizations such as the 'Committee of Relatives of Disappeared Persons,' over 7,000 civilian opponents of the security forces were 'disappeared' or found dead in 1970 and 1971, followed by an additional 8,000 in 1972 and 1973.

In October 1971, over 12,000 students at the University of San Carlos of Guatemala went on a general strike to protest the killing of students by the security forces; they called for an end to the "state of siege." On 27 November 1971, the Guatemalan military responded to the upheaval with an extensive raid on the main campus of the university, seeking cached weapons. It mobilized 800 army personnel, tanks, helicopters, and armored cars for the raid. They conducted a room-to-room search of the entire campus but found no evidence or supplies.

The "State of Siege" remained in effect until the end of 1972, when the Osorio regime announced the military defeat of the insurgency. The end of the "State of Siege" coincided with the forced disappearance of much of the PGT's central committee. In the period between January and September 1973, the Guatemalan Human Rights Commission documented the deaths and forced disappearances of 1,314 individuals by government death squads. This repression led to international human rights organizations characterizing the Guatemalan government as one of the world's most repressive regimes. Amnesty International mentioned Guatemala as one of several countries under a human rights state of emergency while citing "the high incidence of disappearances of Guatemalan citizens" as a significant and continuing problem in its 1972–1973 annual report. The Guatemalan Human Rights Commission estimated that 20,000 people were killed or "disappeared" between 1970 and 1974 under the Arana government.

Under Arana, death squads were used not only as a counterinsurgency tactic but as a tactic for fighting crime. In one incident on 13 October 1972, ten people were knifed to death in the name of a death squad known as the "Avenging Vulture." Guatemalan government sources told the U.S. Department of State that the "Avenging Vulture" and other similar death squads operating during the period were a "smoke screen" for extra-legal tactics the National Police employed against non-political delinquents. Overall, as many as 42,000 Guatemalan civilians were killed or "disappeared" during the Mendez and Arana regimes.

== Later life ==
Following his presidency, Arana withdrew from political life and founded a political party, Central Auténtica Nacionalista (CAN). The party participated in several elections but had little impact. He died in December 2003.

== Bibliography ==
- Archivo Histórico de la Policía Nacional (2013). From Silence to Memory: Revelations of the AHPN (PDF). Eugene, OR: University of Oregon Libraries. ISBN 978-0-985-82041-1.
- Amnesty International (1972). Amnesty International Annual Report 1971–1972. London, UK: Amnesty International Publications.
- Amnesty International (1973). Amnesty International Annual Report 1972–1973. London, UK: Amnesty International Publications.
- Amnesty International (1976). Amnesty International Annual Report 1975–1976. London, UK: Amnesty International Publications.
- Anderson, Thomas P. (1988). Politics in Central America: Guatemala, El Salvador, Honduras, and Nicaragua (revised ed.). Greenwood Publishing Group. p. 256. ISBN 9780275928834.
- Beckett, Ian; Pimlott, John (2011). Counter Insurgency: Lessons from history. Pen and Sword. p. 240. ISBN 9781848843967.
- Centeno, Miguel (2007). Warfare in Latin America. International library of essays on military history. Vol. 2. Ashgate. ISBN 9780754624868.
- Chomsky, Noam; Herman, Edward S. (2014). The Washington Connection and Third World Fascism: The Political Economy of Human Rights. Vol. I. Haymarket Books. p. 462. ISBN 9781608464487.
- CIRMA (n.d.). "Archivo sobre el Ejército Guerrillero de los Pobres". Archived from the original on 13 October 2013.
- Corte Interamericana de Derechos Humanos (19 June 2014). "Scientific Responsibility, Human Rights & Law Program". Shr.aaas.org.
- Defense Intelligence Agency (1971). Guatemalan Antiterrorist Campaign (PDF). Defense Intelligence Agency, Secret Intelligence Bulletin.
- Doyle, Kate; Osorio, Carlos (2013). "U.S. policy in Guatemala, 1966–1996". National Security Archive Electronic. George Washington University: National Security Archive.
- Dunkerley, James (1988). Title Power in the Isthmus: A Political History of Modern Central America. Verso. p. 691. ISBN 9780860919124.
- Elías, José (7 December 2003). "Carlos Manuel Arana Osorio, expresidente de Guatemala". El País (in Spanish). Madrid, España.
- Grandin, Greg; Klein, Naomi (2011). The Last Colonial Massacre: Latin America in the Cold War. Chicago, IL: University of Chicago Press. ISBN 9780226306902.
- Herrera, O.; Reyes, K. (2004). "CEH: La guerrilla cometió una masacre aterrorizante". El Periódico (in Spanish). Guatemala. Archived from the original on 7 October 2013.
- Lopes, Paul D. (1985). The Agrarian Crises in Modern Guatemala. Madison, Wisconsin: University of Wisconsin.
- McClintock, Michael (1985). "State Terror and Popular Resistance in Guatemala". The American Connection. Vol. 2. London, UK: Zed. ISBN 9780862322595.
- Martínez, Francisco Mauricio (2005). "Carlos Sandoval: "Somos elitistas" Los masones siempre han estado presentes en la vida política del mundo, y en Guatemala su pensamiento se refleja en las leyes de beneficio relacionadas con el trabajo, la mujer y la niñez". Prensa Libre (in Spanish). Guatemala. Archived from the original on 25 December 2012.
- Menton, Seymour; Goodsell, James Nelson; Jonas, Susanne (1973). Report from Ad Hoc committee on Guatemala. Latin American Studies Association.
- Molina Calderón, José (2011). "Arana Osorio y el shock petrolero". Prensa Libre, Suplemento Económico (in Spanish). Guatemala. Archived from the original on 6 October 2014.
- Norton, Chris (1985). "Guatemala, charged with rights violations, searches for respect". The Christian Science Monitor. Archived from the original on 29 January 2015.
- Parrinello, Danilo (2013). "Carlos Manuel Arana Osorio". elPeriódico (in Spanish). Guatemala. Archived from the original on 7 October 2013.
- Otto René Castillo official website (n.d.). "Muerte de Otto René Castillo". Ottorenecastillo.org (in Spanish). Archived from the original on 8 August 2014.
- Solano, Luis (2012). Contextualización histórica de la Franja Transversal del Norte (FTN) (PDF) (in Spanish). Centro de Estudios y Documentación de la Frontera Occidental de Guatemala, CEDFOG. Archived from the original (PDF) on 13 November 2014.
- Torres Rivas, Edelberto (1980). "Guatemala: Crisis and Political Violence". NACLA Report on the Americas. Vol. 14–18. North American Congress on Latin America.
- Uekert, Brenda (1995). Rivers of Blood: A Comparative Study of Government Massacres. Greenwood Publishing Group. ISBN 9780275951658.
- US Department of State (1967). "Guatemala". Assignment terror: The Army's Special Unit. National Security Archive Electronic. Vol. Briefing Book No. George Washington University: National Security Archive.
- US Department of State (1974). Subject: Internal Security: "Death Squad" Strikes (PDF). George Washington University: U.S. Department of State, Secret cable.
- "Guatemala: murió Arana Osorio". BBC Mundo. London, UK. 2003.

Government offices
Preceded by Julio Méndez Montenegro	President of Guatemala; 1970–1974	Succeeded by Kjell Laugerud García
