= Julio César Méndez Montenegro =

Guatemalan politician; President of Guatemala (1915-1996)

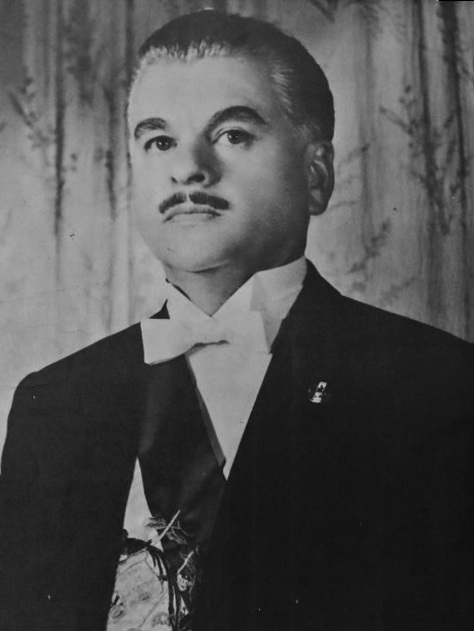
- Official portrait, 1966

34th President of Guatemala
- In office July 1, 1966 – July 1, 1970
- Vice President: Clemente Marroquín Rojas
- Preceded by: Enrique Peralta Azurdia
- Succeeded by: Carlos Arana Osorio

Personal details
- Born: November 23, 1915 Guatemala City
- Died: April 30, 1996 (aged 80) Guatemala City
- Party: Revolutionary Party
- Spouse: Sara de la Hoz (1919–2015)
- Parent(s): Marcial Méndez and Mélida Montenegro
- Education: Universidad de San Carlos

Julio César Méndez Montenegro (November 23, 1915 – April 30, 1996) was a Guatemalan academic who served as the 34th president of Guatemala from July 1966 to July 1970. Mendez was elected on a platform promising democratic reforms and the curtailment of military power, and he was the only civilian to occupy Guatemala's presidency during the long period of military rule between 1954 and 1986. His election and swearing in was considered a major turning point for the long military-led Guatemala. He was the first cousin of César Montenegro Paniagua whose kidnapping, torture and murder during the Julio César Méndez presidency is rumored to have been undertaken with presidential sanction.

== Presidency (1966–1970) ==
In 1966, the left-of-center Méndez defied odds after being elected and successfully sworn in as President of Guatemala. As a civilian who previously made a career as a law professor, Méndez's election, despite challenges, was also considered a historical transition from longstanding military rule in Guatemala. At the time of Méndez's election, Juan Jose Arévalo, who served as President of Guatemala from 1945 to 1951, was the only civilian to complete a full presidential term since Guatemala's independence in 1847.

It was during the Mendez presidency that the United States dramatically expanded its military mission in Guatemala. Within days of Mendez taking office, US Colonel John Webber Jr. was dispatched to the country to assist in modernizing Guatemala's counterinsurgency apparatus. Under Colonel Webber's command, the United States expanded training within Guatemala's 5,000-man army and outfitted the Guatemalan security forces with the most modern counterinsurgency equipment available. The United States also assisted the Guatemalan security forces in the implementation and use of counter-terrorism, and the establishment of counter-terror units under the supervision of U.S. police advisors. With increased US military support, the Guatemalan Army launched a counter-insurgency campaign that successfully combated and dispersed the left-wing guerrilla organizations fighting in the mountains and country. The guerrillas, including the Rebel Armed Forces (Fuerzas Armadas Rebeldes — FAR), then concentrated their attacks in Guatemala City, assassinating many leading representatives of the military government, U.S. military advisors, and the American ambassador John Gordon Mein, in 1968.

=== "White Terror" and paramilitarism ===
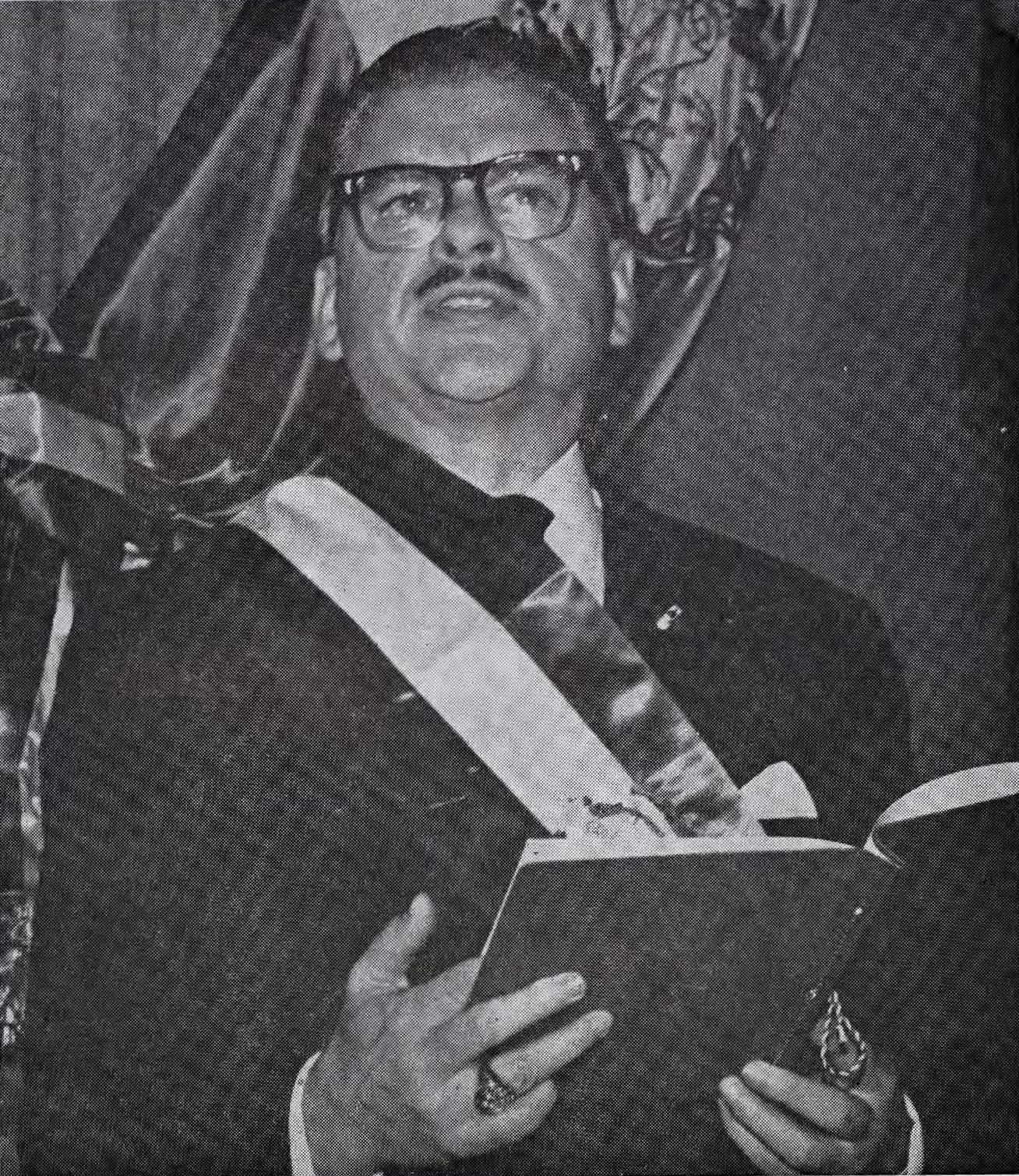
Méndez Montenegro delivers his inauguration speech, July 1966.

The repression that began to take shape under the presidency of Enrique Peralta Azurdia intensified under Mendez. With the onset of the Guatemalan army's first major anti-guerrilla offensive, the army and security forces carried out widespread extrajudicial killing, torture and forced disappearances. The repression was most intense in the southeastern region of the country, particularly in the department of Zacapa, under the command of Colonel Carlos Manuel Arana Osorio.

In March 1966, thirty Guatemalan Party of Labour (PGT) associates were kidnapped, tortured, and killed by the security forces. This was one of the first major instances of forced disappearance in Latin American history. These 30 disappearances marked the beginning of a dramatic increase of state repression in 1966. When law students at the University of San Carlos used legal measures (such as habeas corpus petitions) to require the government to present the detainees at court, some of the students were "disappeared" in turn.

In exchange for military support of his administration, President Mendez authorized the armed forces to use "any means necessary" to suppress the insurgency. No longer bound to the rule of law, the security forces resorted to terror to control the population and dismantle the civilian support base of the insurgency. Guatemalan government forces killed or "disappeared" thousands of civilians during the escalation of the counterinsurgency. The repression was most intense in the eastern regions where the MR-13 operated, and in Guatemala City where the PGT operated. In eastern Guatemala, government forces engaged in the massacre of civilians and destruction of peasant communities as a means of breaking up guerrilla bases.

Some observers referred to the policy of the Guatemalan government as "White Terror" -a term previously used to describe similar periods of anti-communist mass killing in countries such as Taiwan and Spain- Observers estimate that as many as 15,000 Guatemalans were killed by the military and government-led death squads in three years of Mendez's presidency to eliminate fewer than 300 Marxist guerrillas. Amnesty International cited lower estimates of 3,000 to 8,000 peasants killed by the military during that time. Colonel Arana, who commanded the Guatemalan army, earned the nickname "Butcher of Zacapa" or "Jackal of the East." The victims included guerrilla sympathizers, labor union leaders, intellectuals, students, and people vaguely defined "enemies of the government."

The government's use of "any means necessary" resulted in the opposition increasing its level of resistance to ensure its survival. The "White Terror" (which led to the destruction of the FAR's ladino peasant base in the eastern provinces) caused the MR-13 to retreat to Guatemala City. There, the MR-13 began to engage in selective killings of members of the security forces as well as U.S. military advisors. The insurgents assassinated the American ambassador to Guatemala, John Gordon Mein, in 1968, and the German ambassador to Guatemala, Karl Von Spreti, in 1970.

==== SCUGA ====
Following the inauguration of Méndez Montenegro, he appointed Colonel Rafael Arriaga Bosque to Defense Minister. Mendez activated the 'Special Commando Unit of the Guatemalan Army' (SCUGA). The SCUGA was placed under the command of Colonel Máximo Zepeda in January 1967, after which point it assumed command over most of the Guatemalan government's urban counterinsurgency operations against PGT. Composed of both military and civilian personnel, the SCUGA functioned both as a counter-terror apparatus and as an intelligence-gathering apparatus. SCUGA commandos routinely carried out abductions, bombings, street assassinations, torture, "disappearances" and executions of both documented and suspected communists. The SCUGA often collaborated with the Fourth Corps of the Guatemalan National Police, which carried out similar activities. Together these forces often carried out various counter-terror and counter-insurgency operations under the guise of fictitious paramilitary death squads and anti-communist front organizations (known by acronyms such as the NOA, CADEG, CRAG and RAYO). In addition to engaging in operations under the guise of para-militarism, the SCUGA nominally worked with paramilitary death squads such as the infamous Mano Blanca ("White Hand").

==== Mano Blanca ====
Mano Blanca, or the Movement of Organized Nationalist Action, was set up in 1966 as a front for the MLN to carry out its more violent activities, along with many other similar groups, including the New Anticommunist Organization and the Anticommunist Council of Guatemala. These three groups operated within the United States supported government arm known as the Regional Telecommunications Center, which linked them to various government, military and police agencies. This network was built on the Committees against Communism created by the Central Intelligence Agency after the coup in 1954. The members of Mano Blanco were largely army officers, and the outfit received a lot of its funding from planters. It also received information from military intelligence. It was one of the only death squads directly affiliated with a political party. Most such groups were "phantom organizations," created so that the Guatemalan military could carry out illicit activities.

Armed with this support, Mano Blanca began a campaign described by the United States Department of State as one of "kidnappings, torture, and summary execution." One of the main targets of Mano Blanca was the Partido Revolucionario (PR), an anti-communist group that was the only major reform oriented party allowed to operate under the military-dominated regime. Other targets included the banned leftist parties. The PR drew a lot of its members from the activist base that had been created during the agrarian reform program begun by former president Jacobo Arbenz in 1952, and these individuals were targeted by the Mano Blanca. When it was founded, the group had the specific aim of preventing Méndez Montenegro from taking power. During the 1970s, Mano Blanca was led by Raúl Lorenzana.

Human rights activist Blase Bonpane described the activities of Mano Blanca as being an integral part of the policy of the Guatemalan government, and by extension the policy of the United States government and the Central Intelligence Agency. One of the deaths Mano Blanca was responsible for was that César Montenegro Paniagua, a communist politician who was killed in retribution for the killing of West German ambassador Karl von Spreti by FAR guerrillas. Mano Blanca also sent death threats to one of the leaders of a student organization. When he was questioned about the reason for the death threats, the leader of Mano Blanca stated that the student needed to be killed because he was a communist, and would "give his life for the poor." Overall, Mano Blanca was responsible for thousands of murders and kidnappings, leading travel writer Paul Theroux to refer to them as "Guatemala's version of a volunteer Gestapo unit."

== Bibliography ==
- Batz, Giovanni (2013). "Military Factionalism and the Consolidation of Power in 1960s Guatemala". In Garrard-Burnett, Virginia; Lawrence, Mark Atwood; Moreno, Julia E. (eds.). Beyond the Eagle's Shadow: New Histories of Latin America's Cold War. University of New Mexico Press. pp. 64–65. ISBN 978-0-8263-5369-6.
- Blum, William (2003). Killing Hope: US Military and CIA interventions since World War II. Zed Books. pp. 233–234. ISBN 978-1-84277-369-7.
- Bonpane, Blase (12 May 2000). Guerrillas of Peace: Liberation Theology and the Central American Revolution. iUniverse. pp. 30–50. ISBN 978-0-595-00418-8.
- CIA (November 1967). "Special Commando Unit of the Guatemalan Army - SCUGA" (PDF). CIA, Secret Information Report. National Security Archive Electronic. Briefing Book No. 11. George Washington University: National Security Archive.
- Corte Interamericana de Derechos Humanos (19 June 2014). "Scientific Responsibility, Human Rights & Law Program". Shr.aaas.org.
- Doyle, Kate; Osorio, Carlos (2013). "U.S. policy in Guatemala, 1966–1996". National Security Archive Electronic. George Washington University: National Security Archive.
- Ibarra, Carlos Figueroa (June 2006). "The culture of terror and Cold War in Guatemala". Journal of Genocide Research. 8 (2): 191–208. doi:10.1080/14623520600703081. S2CID 72555904.
- Grandin, Greg; Klein, Naomi (30 July 2011). The Last Colonial Massacre: Latin America in the Cold War. University of Chicago Press. pp. 87–89. ISBN 978-0-226-30690-2.
- Levenson-Estrada, Deborah (Winter 2003). "The Life That Makes Us Die/The Death That Makes Us Live: Facing Terrorism in Guatemala City". Radical History Review. 2003 (85): 94–104. doi:10.1215/01636545-2003-85-94. S2CID 143353418.
- McClintock, Michael (1985). "State Terror and Popular Resistance in Guatemala". The American Connection. Vol. 2. London, UK: Zed. ISBN 9780862322595.
- Paige, Jeffery M. (1983). "Social Theory and Peasant Revolution in Vietnam and Guatemala" (PDF). Theory and Society. 12 (6): 699–737. doi:10.1007/BF00912078. hdl:2027.42/43640. S2CID 141234746.
- Rothenburg, David, ed. (2012). Memory of Silence: The Guatemalan Truth Commission Report. Palgrave Macmillan. pp. 112–113. ISBN 978-1-137-01114-5.
- Theroux, Paul (2014). The Old Patagonian Express. Houghton Mifflin Harcourt. pp. 100–103. ISBN 978-0-547-52400-9.
- Torres Rivas, Edelberto (1980). "Guatemala: Crisis and Political Violence". NACLA Report on the Americas. Vol. 14–18. North American Congress on Latin America.
- US Department of State (23 October 1967). Guatemala: A Counter-Insurgency Running Wild? (PDF). National Security Archive Electronic. Vol. Briefing Book No. 32. George Washington University: National Security Archive. p. 1.
- US State Department (1967). "Guatemala". Assignment terror: The Army's Special Unit. National Security Archive Electronic. Vol. Briefing Book No. George Washington University: National Security Archive.
- "Guatemala Red Killed For Revenge". Washington Post. Washington, D.C. 7 April 1970.

Government offices
Preceded by Enrique Peralta	President of Guatemala; 1966–1970	Succeeded by Carlos Arana
