= National Liberation Movement (Guatemala) =

National Liberation Movement Movimiento de Liberación Nacional
- Party flag
- President: Fernando Romeo Lucas García (last)
- Founder: Carlos Castillo Armas
- Founded: 23 December 1953; 72 years ago
- Dissolved: 2 February 2000; 26 years ago
- Headquarters: Guatemala City
- Youth wing: Juventud MLN
- Paramilitary wing: Mano Blanca
- Ideology: Fascism; Ultraconservatism; Radical anti-communism
- Political position: Far-right
- International affiliation: World League for Freedom and Democracy
- Colours: Blue; White; Red
- Slogan: ¡MLN!

The National Liberation Movement (Spanish: Movimiento de Liberación Nacional, MLN) was a Guatemalan political party formed in 1954 by Carlos Castillo Armas. The party served as political platform for the military junta.

== History ==
The MLN was founded as the National Democratic Movement (Spanish: Movimiento Democratico Nacional, MDN) in 1954 by President Carlos Castillo Armas. It was the ruling party from 1954 until 1958. The party supported the government of President Miguel Ydígoras Fuentes (1958–1963).

The 1963 coup that saw the government of Ydígoras Fuentes overthrown led to the MLN becoming the main party of the military. Although they were not successful in the presidential election of 1964 their candidate in 1970, Carlos Manuel Arana Osorio, was elected President, in coalition with the Institutional Democratic Party (Spanish: Partido Institucional Democrático, PID). Victory was also secured in the 1974 election when Kjell Eugenio Laugerud García's candidacy was also endorsed by the PID. However they later broke their alliance with the PID for the 1978 elections. Its candidate, former President Enrique Peralta Azurdia, placed second in the election. The party was close to the MANO death squad. Another faction of the party, the National Reformist Movement, split away after the coup although it never became a major factor in electoral politics.

In the 1982 election, the MLN's candidate was former vice-president Mario Sandoval Alarcón, who placed second in what was considered a fraudulent election, followed by a coup d'état in 1982. For the 1984 elections to the Constitutional Assembly, the party allied with National Authentic Central, another right-wing party, and the 23 seats they won constituted the largest bloc in the assembly, albeit outnumbered by reformist parties. They renewed their alliance with the Institutional Democratic Party for the 1985 election. Once more, Mario Sandoval Alarcón was its presidential candidate, and placed fourth in the race while the alliance won 12 seats in Congress. The party faded thereafter: it ran alongside the National Advancement Front in 1990 without much success, winning just 4 seats in Congress. Left to continue alone, it secured less than 1% in 1995 (winning a single seat) and again in 1999 (when it lost representation).

== See also ==
- Roberto Herrera Ibarguen
