= Fernando Romeo Lucas García =

37th President of Guatemala from 1978 to 1982

General of Division Fernando Romeo Lucas García
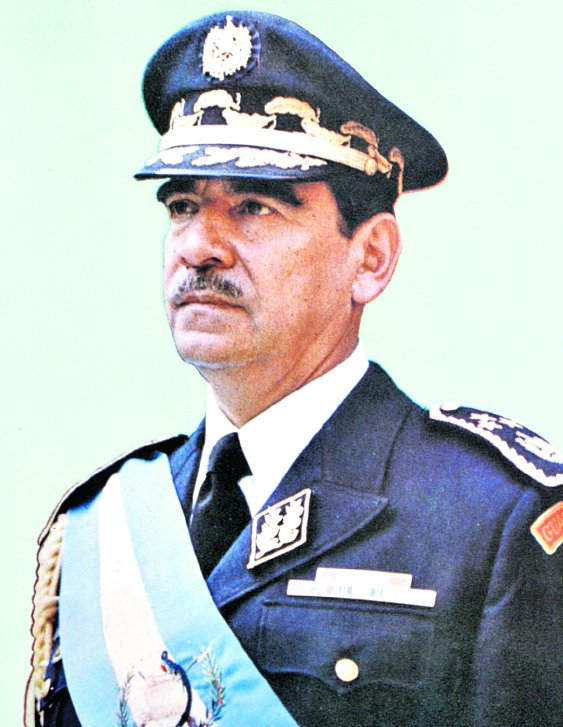
- Official portrait, 1978

37th President of Guatemala
- In office July 1, 1978 – March 23, 1982
- Vice President: Francisco Villagrán Kramer (1978–1980); Óscar Mendoza Azurdia (1980–1982)
- Preceded by: Kjell Laugerud Garcia
- Succeeded by: Efraín Ríos Montt

Personal details
- Born: 4 July 1924 San Juan Chamelco, Guatemala
- Died: 27 May 2006 (aged 81) Puerto la Cruz, Venezuela
- Party: Institutional Democratic Party
- Spouse: Elsa Cirigliano (m. 1978)
- Occupation: General
- Personal fortune: His family possessed large extension of land in Alta Verapaz. After the government created the Franja Transversal del Norte -Northern Cross Strip- in 1970, he came to own almost 30% of Alta Verapaz, aside from investment in oil and wood mills in the area.

Military service
- Allegiance: Guatemala
- Branch/service: Guatemalan Army
- Years of service: 1949–1977
- Rank: General

Fernando Romeo Lucas García (4 July 1924 – 27 May 2006) was a military officer and politician who served as the 37th president of Guatemala from July 1, 1978, to March 23, 1982. He was elected as the nominee for the Institutional Democratic Party (with the support of the Revolutionary Party). During Lucas García's regime, tensions between the radical left and the government increased. The military started to murder political opponents while counterinsurgency measures further terrorized populations of poor civilians.

== Franja Transversal del Norte ==
The first settler project in the FTN was in Sebol-Chinajá in Alta Verapaz. Sebol, then regarded as a strategic point and route through the Cancuén River, which communicated with Petén through the Usumacinta River on the border with Mexico, and the only road that existed was a dirt one built by President Lázaro Chacón in 1928. In 1958, during the government of General Miguel Ydígoras Fuentes, the Inter-American Development Bank (IDB) financed infrastructure projects in Sebol. (Note: Sebol finally adopted the name "Fray Bartolomé de las Casas', municipality created in 1983 in Alta Verapaz.) In 1960, then Army captain Fernando Romeo Lucas García inherited Saquixquib and Punta de Boloncó farms in northeastern Sebol. In 1963, he bought the farm "San Fernando" El Palmar de Sejux and finally bought the "Sepur" farm near San Fernando. During those years, Lucas was in the Guatemalan legislature and lobbied in Congress to boost investment in that area of the country.

In those years, the importance of the region was in livestock, exploitation of precious export wood, and archaeological wealth. Timber contracts were granted to multinational companies such as Murphy Pacific Corporation from California, which invested US$30 million in the colonization of southern Petén and Alta Verapaz and formed the North Impulsadora Company. Colonization of the area was made through a process by which inhospitable areas of the FTN were granted to native peasants.

In 1962, the DGAA became the National Institute of Agrarian Reform (INTA) by Decree 1551, which created the law of Agrarian Transformation. In 1964, INTA defined the geography of the FTN as the northern part of the departments of Huehuetenango, Quiché, Alta Verapaz, and Izabal, and that same year, priests of the Maryknoll order and the Order of the Sacred Heart began the first process of colonization, along with INTA, carrying settlers from Huehuetenango to the Ixcán sector in Quiché.

"It is of public interest and national emergency, the establishment of Agrarian Development Zones in the area included within the municipalities: San Ana Huista, San Antonio Huista, Nentón, Jacaltenango, San Mateo Ixtatán, and Santa Cruz Barillas in Huehuetenango; Chajul and San Miguel Uspantán in Quiché; Cobán, Chisec, San Pedro Carchá, Lanquín, Senahú, Cahabón and Chahal, in Alta Verapaz and the entire department of Izabal."

— Decree 60-70, 1st Article

The Northern Transversal Strip was officially created by the government of General Carlos Arana Osorio in 1970 by Decree 60-70 in the Congress for agricultural development.

In 1977, when he stepped down as defense minister to pursue his presidential campaign, General Fernando Romeo Lucas García also happened to hold the position of coordinator of the megaproject of the Northern Transversal Strip, whose main objective was to bring production of to facilitate oil exploitation of that vast land. By managing this project, Lucas García obtained greater knowledge and interaction with the transnational companies that were in the area and increased his own personal economic interests in the region, given that his family-owned land there and he had commercial relationships with Shenandoah Oil company.

=== Cuchumaderas case ===
In 1977, the municipality of San Mateo Ixtatán signed a contract with Cuchumaderas company for the "sanitation, reforestation, maintenance and exploitation of forests, based on the urgent need to build and maintain natural resources attacked by the pine beetle." Upon learning of the negotiation between the municipality and the company, town people forced the authorities to conduct an open meeting and explain the characteristics of the commitment; each of the members of the municipal corporation gave their account of the negotiation, showing contradictions that led to resignation of the mayor at the very same meeting. Despite threats received by some residents of San Mateo, they organized a local committee to defend the forest and started a lawsuit against the company. As a result, forest extraction processes were stopped.

Cuchumaderas was closely related to the interests of the military leaders who held political power in the 1970s and spread throughout the defined territory of the FTN; the forest wealth of San Mateo Ixtatán made it the target of economic interests in the Northern Transversal Strip. Ronald Hennessey, pastor of San Mateo Ixtatán during the Guatemala Civil War, arrived in October 1980, amid people's fight against the presence of Cuchumaderas and accused in his writings as Cuchumaderas partners the following people: Lucas Garcia, who FTN director when Cuchumaderas was founded, general Otto Spiegler Noriega, who was the Chief of Staff of the Army and later became Minister of Defense under Lucas García; Jorge Spiegler Noriega, manager of the National Forestry Institute (INAFOR), and then-colonel Rodolfo Lobos Zamora, commander of Military Zone of Quiché. However, later in the Commercial Register, investigations showed that the owner of the company was a different person: it was the engineer Fernando Valle Arizpe, (Note: Valle Arizpe died on 26 October 2010.) and was well known for being the husband of journalist Irma Flaquer until 1965. Valle Arizpe had developed close relations with senior officials and close members of the government of Lucas García, especially Donaldo Alvarez Ruiz, the Minister of Interior. (Note: Given his family wealth, Valle Arizpe was able to afford Alvarez's legal services from the time the latter graduated; over the years, their continuous dealings led to a strong friendship.)

During the Lucas García administration, the Army Engineers Battalion built the road stretch from Cadenas (Petén / Izabal) to Fray Bartolomé de las Casas.

After the overthrow of Lucas Garcia on 23 March 1982, rose to power a military triumvirate headed by General Efraín Ríos Montt, along with Horacio Maldonado Shaad colonels and Francisco Gordillo. On 2 June 1982, international journalists interviewed Ríos Montt, who said the following regarding Lucas García government and FTN:

1. What were the causes of the coup?
There were many causes; government had reached such decomposition that it was slashing its roots; it had no roots or the people or institutions. As a result, it fell; plain and simple.

2. Was there corruption in the previous government?
I understand that there was a lot of corruption. It came to the point with corruption, that Guatemala -being a country with great economic reserves- lost its economic reserves in two years; and also practically mortgaged the country with large constructions made -such as peripheral highway loops- which really had no concept of planning from the point of view of transit and traffic.

3. During Lucas García regime there were many social projects, much more than in previous governments, except in the revolutionary governments of (1944–1954). How will this government be different?
It was not Lucas Garcia, but the government itself; they gave lots on the banks of the Transversal del Norte, to get (farmers) out of land where there was oil. Then they got land because they bought it to keep the money from the farm sales. They grabbed these people and threw it over the Transversal del Norte, and that is why they built the road to the Transversal del Norte: to avoid protests of the people who were taken from their land, where there was oil.

== Rise to power ==
Due to his seniority in the military and economic elites in Guatemala and his fluency fluent in Q'ekchi, one of the Guatemalan indigenous languages, Lucas García was the ideal official candidate for the 1978 elections. To further enhance his image, he was paired with the leftist doctor Francisco Villagrán Kramer as his running mate. Villagrán Kramer was a man of recognized democratic trajectory, having participated in the Revolution of 1944 and was linked to the interests of transnational corporations and elites, as he was one of Guatemala's main advisers of agricultural, industrial, and financial chambers. Despite the democratic facade, the electoral victory was not easy. The establishment had to impose Lucas García, causing further discredit to the electoral system —which had already suffered fraud when General Laugerud was imposed in the 1974 elections.

In 1976, a student group called "FRENTE" emerged at the University of San Carlos, which completely swept all student body positions that were up for election that year. FRENTE leaders were primarily members of the Patriotic Workers' Youth, the Guatemalan Labor Party youth wing (Partido Guatemalteco del Trabajo (PGT)). This Guatemalan communist party had worked in the shadows since it was illegalized in 1954. Unlike other Marxist organizations in Guatemala at the time, PGT leaders trusted the mass movement to gain power through elections.

FRENTE used its power within the student associations to launch a political campaign for the 1978 university general elections. It allied with leftist faculty members grouped in "University Vanguard." The alliance was effective, and Oliverio Castañeda de León was elected as President of the Student Body and Saúl Osorio Paz as President of the university; plus, they had ties with the university workers union (STUSC) through their PGT connections. Osorio Paz gave space and support to the student movement, and instead of having a conflictive relationship with students, different representations combined to build a higher education institution of higher social projection. In 1978, the University of San Carlos became one of the sectors with more political weight in Guatemala; that year, the student movement, faculty, and University Governing Board -Consejo Superior Universitario- (Note: CSU members are: University president, University Provost, University Treasurer, College Deans, ten tenured faculty representatives, ten student body representatives and eleven representatives from the Professional Clubs.) united against the government and were in favor of opening spaces for the neediest sectors. To expand its university extension, the Student Body (AEU) rehabilitated the "Student House" in downtown Guatemala City; they welcomed and supported families of villagers and peasants already sensitized politically. They also organized groups of workers in the informal trade.

At the beginning of his tenure as president, Saúl Osorio founded the weekly Siete Días en la USAC, which, besides reporting on the university's activities, constantly denounced the violation of human rights, especially the repression against the popular movement. It also told what was happening with the revolutionary Nicaragua and El Salvador movements. The state university was a united and progressive institution for a few months, preparing to confront the State head-on.

FRENTE had to face the radical left, represented then by the Student Revolutionary Front "Robin García" (FERG), which emerged during the Labor Day march of 1 May 1978. FERG coordinated several student associations at different colleges within the University of San Carlos and public secondary education institutions. This coordination between legal groups came from the Guerrilla Army of the Poor (EGP), a guerrilla group that had appeared in 1972 and had its headquarters in the oil-rich region of northern Quiché department -i.e., the Ixil Triangle of Ixcán, Nebaj and Chajul in Franja Transversal del Norte. Although not strictly an armed group, FERG sought confrontation with government forces all the time, giving prominence to measures that could degenerate into mass violence and paramilitary activity. Its members were not interested in working within an institutional framework and never asked permission for their public demonstrations or actions.

On 7 March 1978, Lucas Garcia was elected president; shortly after, on 29 May 1978—in the late days of Laugerud García government—in the central square of Panzós, Alta Verapaz, members of the Zacapa Military Zone attacked a peaceful peasant demonstration, killing many people. The deceased, indigenous peasants who had been summoned in place were fighting for the legalization of public lands they had occupied for years. Their struggle faced them directly with investors who wanted to exploit the mineral wealth of the area, particularly oil reserves—by Basic Resources International and Shenandoah Oil— and nickel -EXMIBAL. The Panzós Massacre caused a stir at the university because of the high number of victims and conflicts arising from the exploitation of natural resources by foreign companies. In 1978, for example, Osorio Paz and other universities received death threats for their outspoken opposition to constructing an inter-oceanic pipeline that would cross the country to facilitate oil exploration. On June 8, the AEU organized a massive protest in downtown Guatemala City where speakers denounced the slaughter of Panzós and expressed their repudiation of the Laugerud García regime in stronger terms than ever before.

== Presidency (1978–1982) ==
Whereas under the previous administration, the human rights situation in Guatemala had improved, the regime of Lucas Garcia brought the repression to much the same level observed during the "State of Siege" period under former President Arana Osorio (1970–1974).

=== Initial protests and early crisis ===
On 4 August 1978, barely a month after he took office, high school, university students, and other popular movement sectors, organized the mass movement's first urban protest of the Lucas García period. The demonstrations, intended as a march against violence, were attended by an estimated 10,000 people. The new Secretary of the Interior under President Lucas García, Donaldo Alvarez Ruiz, promised to break up any protests done without government permission, as the new government had realized that the opposition and Marxist left had a powerful organization by the time the new president was inaugurated. The protestors, having refused to ask for permission, were met by the Pelotón Modelo (Model Platoon) of the National Police. Employing new anti-riot gear donated by the United States Government, Platoon agents surrounded marchers and tear-gassed them. Students were forced to retreat, and dozens of people, primarily school-aged adolescents, were hospitalized. This was followed by more protests and death squad killings throughout the later part of the year. In September 1978, a general strike broke out to protest sharp increases in public transportation fares; the government responded harshly, arresting dozens of protesters and injuring many more. However, due to the campaign, the government agreed to the protesters' demands, including establishing a public transportation subsidy. Fearful that this concession would encourage more protests, the military government, along with state-sponsored paramilitary death squads, generated an unsafe situation for public leaders.

=== Increased insurgency and state repression: 1980–1982 ===
The effects of state repression on the population further radicalized individuals within the mass movement. They led and led to increased popular support for the insurgency. In late 1979, the EGP expanded its influence, controlling a large amount of territory in the Ixil Triangle in El Quiche and holding many demonstrations in Nebaj, Chajul, and Cotzal. At the same time the EGP was expanding its presence in the Altiplano, a new insurgent movement called the ORPA (Revolutionary Organization of Armed People) made itself known. Composed of local youths and university intellectuals, the ORPA developed out of the Regional de Occidente, movement, which split from the FAR-PGT in 1971. The ORPA's leader, Rodrigo Asturias (a former activist with the PGT and first-born son of Nobel Prize-winning author Miguel Ángel Asturias), formed the organization after returning from exile in Mexico. ORPA established an operational base in the mountains and rain forests above the coffee plantations of southwestern Guatemala and in the Atitlan, where it enjoyed considerable popular support. On 18 September 1979, ORPA made its existence publicly known when it occupied the Mujulia coffee farm in the coffee-growing region of the Quezaltenango province to hold a political education meeting with the workers.

Insurgent movements active in the initial phase of the conflict, such as the FAR, also began to reemerge and prepare for combat. In 1980, guerrilla operations on both the urban and rural fronts greatly intensified, with the insurgency carrying out many overt acts of armed propaganda and assassinations of prominent right-wing Guatemalans and landowners. In 1980, armed insurgents assassinated prominent Ixil landowner Enrique Brol and president of the CACIF (Coordinating Committee of Agricultural, Commercial, Industrial, and Financial Associations) Alberto Habie. Encouraged by guerrilla advances elsewhere in Central America, the Guatemalan insurgents, especially the EGP, began to quickly expand their influence through a wide geographic area and across different ethnic groups, thus broadening the appeal of the insurgent movement and providing it with a more extensive popular base. In October 1980, a tripartite alliance was formalized between the EGP, the FAR and the ORPA as a precondition for Cuban-backing.

In early 1981, the insurgency mounted the largest offensive in the country's history. This was followed by an additional offensive towards the end of the year, in which many civilians were forced to participate by the insurgents. Villagers worked with the insurgency to sabotage roads and army establishments and destroy anything of strategic value to the armed forces. By 1981, an estimated 250,000 to 500,000 members of Guatemala's indigenous community actively supported the insurgency. Guatemalan Army Intelligence (G-2) estimated a minimum of 360,000 indigenous supporters of the EGP alone.

=== Civil war in the city ===
"Beheaded corpses hanging from their legs in between what is left from blown up cars, shapeless bodies among glass shards and tree branches all over the place is what a terrorist attack caused yesterday at 9:35 am. El Gráfico reporters were able to get to exact place where the bomb went off, only seconds after the horrific explosion, and found a truly infernal scene in the corner of the 6th avenue and 6th street -where the Presidential Office is located- which had turned into a huge oven -but the solid building where the president worked was safe-. The reporters witnessed the dramatic rescue of the wounded, some of them critical, like the man that completely lost a leg and had only stripes of skin instead."

— El Gráfico, 6 September 1980

On 31 January 1980, Guatemala got worldwide attention when the Spanish Embassy in Guatemala City was burnt down, resulting in 37 deaths, including embassy personnel, high-ranked Guatemalan former government officials, and former vice president Eduardo Cáceres. A group of native people from El Quiché occupied the embassy in a desperate attempt to bring attention to the issues they were having with the Army in that region of the country, which was rich in oil and had been recently populated as part of the "Franja Transversal del Norte" agricultural program. In the end, thirty-seven people died after a fire started within the embassy after the police force tried to occupy the building; after that, Spain broke its diplomatic relationship with Guatemala.

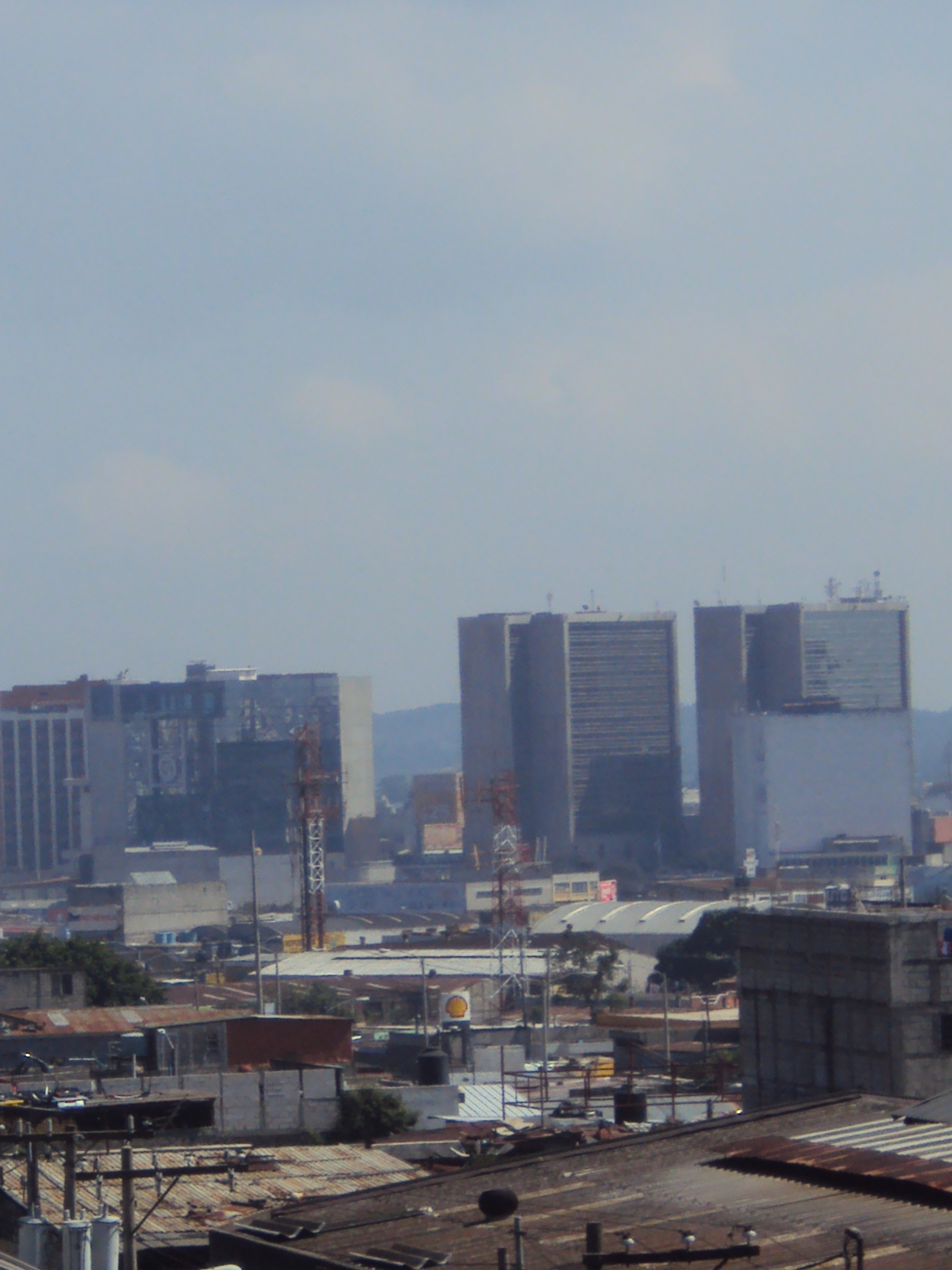
Finance Center in 2011. In 1981, a powerful bomb exploded in the basement of the building, leaving it without windows for several years. The owners -Industrial Bank- decided to keep it open to the public to defy the leftist guerrilla.

In the months following the Spanish Embassy Fire, the human rights situation continued to deteriorate. The daily number of killings by official and unofficial security forces increased from an average of 20 to 30 in 1979 to a conservative estimate of 30 to 40 daily in 1980. Human rights sources estimated that 5,000 Guatemalans were killed by the government for "political reasons" in 1980 alone, making it the worst human rights violator in the hemisphere after El Salvador. (Note: "Guatemala and El Salvador: Latin America's worst human rights violators in 1980" The Council on Hemispheric Affairs) In a report titled Guatemala: A Government Program of Political Murder, Amnesty International stated, "Between January and November 1980, some 3,000 people described by government representatives as "subversives" and "criminals" were either shot on the spot in political assassinations or seized and murdered later; at least 364 others seized in this period have not yet been accounted for."

The repression and excessive force used by the government against the opposition was such that it became a source of contention within Lucas Garcia's administration itself. This contention within the government caused Lucas Garcia's Vice President, Francisco Villagrán Kramer, to resign on September 1, 1980. In his resignation, Kramer cited his disapproval of the government's human rights record as one of the primary reasons for his resignation. He then went into voluntary exile in the United States, taking a position in the Legal Department of the Inter-American Development Bank.

On 5 September 1980, took place a terrorist attack by Ejército Guerrillero de los Pobres (EGP) right in front of the Guatemalan National Palace, then the headquarters of the Guatemalan government. The intention was to prevent the Guatemalan people from supporting a massive demonstration that the government of Lucas Garcia had prepared for Sunday, 7 September 1980. In the attack, six adults and a little boy died after two bombs inside a vehicle went off.

There was an undetermined number of wounded and heavy material losses, not only from art pieces from the National Palace but from all the surrounding buildings, particularly in the Lucky Building, which is right across the Presidential Office. Among the deceased was Domingo Sánchez, Secretary of Agriculture driver; Joaquín Díaz y Díaz, car washer; and Amilcar de Paz, security guard.

The attacks against private financial, commercial, and agricultural targets increased in the Lucas Garcia years, as the leftist Marxist groups saw those institutions as "reactionaries" and "millionaire exploiters" who were collaborating with the genocidal government. The following is a non-exhaustive list of the terrorist attacks that occurred in Guatemala City and are presented in the UN Commission report:

Date	Perpetrator	Target	Result
15 September 1981	Rebel Army Forces	Corporación Financiera Nacional (CORFINA)	Car bomb damaged the building and neighbor Guatemalan and international financial institutions; there were more than Q300k in losses.
19 October 1981	EGP Urban guerrilla	Industrial Bank Financial Center	Building sabotage.
21 December 1981	EGP "Otto René Castillo" commando	Bombs against newly built structures: Chamber of Industry, Torre Panamericana (Bank of Coffee headquarters) and Industrial Bank Financial Center	Car bombs completely destroyed the buildings windows.
28 December 1981	EGP "Otto René Castillo" commando	Industrial Bank Financial Center	Car bomb against the building which virtually destroyed one of the bank towers. In a sign of defiance, the bank did not repair the windows immediately and continued operating as normally as it could.

Despite advances by the insurgency, the insurgency made a series of fatal strategic errors. The successes of the revolutionary forces in Nicaragua against the Somoza regime and the insurgency's victories against the Lucas Garcia government led rebel leaders to falsely conclude that a military equilibrium was being reached in Guatemala. Thus the insurgency underestimated the government's military strength. and found itself overwhelmed and unable to secure its advances and protect the indigenous civilian population from reprisals by the security forces.

=== Operation Ceniza ===
In response to the guerrilla offensive in early 1981, the Guatemalan Army began mobilizing for a large-scale rural counter-offensive. The Lucas government instituted a policy of forced recruitment and began organizing a "task-force" model for fighting the insurgency, by which strategic mobile forces were drawn from larger military brigades. The army, to curtail civilian participation in the insurgency and provide greater distinction between "hostile" and compliant communities in the countryside, resorted to a series of "civic action" measures. The military under Chief of Staff Benedicto Lucas García (the President's brother) began to search out communities in which to organize and recruit civilians into pro-government paramilitary patrols, who would combat the insurgents and kill their collaborators.

In 1980 and 1981, the United States, under the Reagan administration, delivered $10.5 million worth of Bell 212 and Bell 412 helicopters and $3.2 million worth of military trucks and jeeps to the Guatemalan Army. In 1981, the Reagan administration also approved a $2 million covert CIA program for Guatemala.

On April 15, 1981, EGP rebels attacked a Guatemalan Army patrol from the village of Cocob near Nebaj, killing five personnel. On April 17, 1981, a reinforced company of Airborne troops was deployed to the village. They discovered foxholes, guerrillas and a hostile population. The local people to support the guerrillas fully. "The soldiers were forced to fire at anything that moved." The army killed 65 civilians, including 34 children, five adolescents, 23 adults, and two elderly people.

In July 1981, the armed forces initiated a new phase of counterinsurgency operations under the code-name "Operación Ceniza," or "Operation Ashes," which lasted through March 1982. The purpose of the operation was to "separate and isolate the insurgents from the civilian population." During "Operación Ceniza," some 15,000 troops were deployed on a gradual sweep through the predominantly indigenous Altiplano region, comprising the departments of El Quiché and Huehuetenango.

Large numbers of civilians were killed or displaced in the Guatemalan military's counterinsurgency operations. The army, to alienate the insurgents from their civilian base, carried out large-scale mass killings of unarmed civilians, burned villages and crops, and butchered animals, destroying survivors' means of livelihood. Sources with the human rights office of the Catholic Church estimated the death toll from the counterinsurgency in 1981 at 11,000, with most of the victims indigenous peasants of the Guatemalan highlands. Other sources and observers put the death toll due to government repression in 1981 at between 9,000 and 13,500.

As army repression intensified in the countryside, relations between the Guatemalan military establishment and the Lucas Garcia regime worsened. Professionals within the Guatemalan military considered the approach counterproductive because the Lucas government's strategy of military action and systematic terror overlooked the social and ideological causes of the insurgency while radicalizing the civilian population.

Together with the government in neighboring El Salvador, the Lucas Garcia regime was cited as the worst human rights violator in the Western-Hemisphere. The daily number of killings by government forces and officially sanctioned death squads increased from an average of 20 to 30 in 1979 to a conservative estimate of 30 to 40 in 1980. An estimated 5,000 civilians were killed by government forces in Guatemala in 1980. In 1981, the number of killings and assassinations by government forces exceeded 9,000.

The United States, Israel, and Argentina all provided military support to the regime in the form of pipeline aid, sales, credits, training, and counterinsurgency advisors. Between FS 1978 and FS 1980, the U.S. provided $8.5 million in military assistance, mainly FMS credit sales, and approximately $1.8 million in export licensing for commercial arms sales, despite a 1977 congressional prohibition on military aid. In 1980 and 1981, the United States also delivered three Bell 212 and six Bell 412 helicopters worth $10.5 million to the army. In June 1981, the Reagan Administration announced a $3.2 million delivery of 150 military trucks and jeeps to the army, justifying these shipments by blaming the guerrillas for the violence perpetrated against civilians.

In its later years, Lucas Garcia's regime was perceived as a threat by the military establishment in Guatemala, as it engaged in actions that compromised the legitimacy of the Guatemalan military with both the populace and within its ranks, thereby undermining the effectiveness of the counterinsurgency war. In the 1982 elections, Lucas Garcia went against both popular opinion and the military's interests by endording Angel Anibal Guevara, his defense minister.

=== 1982 coup d'état and "state of siege" ===
On March 23, 1982, junior officers under the command of General Efraín Ríos Montt staged a coup d'état and deposed General Romeo Lucas Garcia. Aside from the junior officers involved in engineering the coup, the coup was not supported by any entities within the Lucas government. At the time of the coup, the most of Lucas Garcia's senior officers were unaware of any previous coup plotting on the part of the junior officers or any other entity. General Lucas was reportedly prepared to resist the coup and could have quickly opposed the coup with his contingent of troops stationed at the presidential palace, but was coerced into surrendering by being shown his mother and sister held with rifles to their heads.

== Prosecution ==
In 1999, the Audiencia Nacional of Spain began criminal proceedings for accusations of torture and genocide against the Maya population after a formal petition introduced by Rigoberta Menchú. However, the Venezuelan Supreme Tribunal denied the extradition on 22 June 2005, arguing "...medical reports from García's wife showing that her husband is severely affected by the Alzheimer's disease."

He died in exile in Puerto la Cruz, Venezuela, where he had lived for 12 years with his wife, Elsa Cirigliano, suffering from Alzheimer's disease and various other ailments, at the age of 81.

In May 2018, his brother Manuel Benedicto Lucas García, who served as his Army Chief of Staff, would receive a 58-year prison sentence after being convicted for a 1981 incident that involved torture and rape.

== See also ==
- Carlos Manuel Arana Osorio
- Franja Transversal del Norte
- Guatemalan Civil War
- Kjell Eugenio Laugerud Garcia

== Notes and references ==
=== Bibliography ===
- AAAS (19 June 2014). "Scientific Responsibility, Human Rights & Law Program &#124". AAAS – The World's Largest General Scientific Society. Shr.aaas.org.
- Aguilera Peralta, Gabriel; Romero Imery, Jorge; et al. (1981). Dialéctica del terror en Guatemala (in Spanish). San José: EDUCA.
- Amnesty International (1979). Amnesty International Report 1979. Amnesty International.
- Amnesty International (1981). Guatemala: A Government Program of Political Murder. Amnesty International Publications. ISBN 978-0-86210-026-1.
- Arias, Arturo (1990). "Changing Indian Identity: Guatemala's Violent Transition to Modernity". In Carol Smith (ed.). Guatemalan Indians and the State, 1540 to 1988. Austin: University of Texas Press.
- Ball, Patrick; Kobrak, Paul; Spirer, Herbert F. (n.d.). "State Violence in Guatemala, 1960–1996: A Quantitative Reflection". AAAS.org. Chapter 4: The 1980s. Archived from the original on 5 May 2013.
- BBC (2006). "Guatemala ex-head dies in exile". BBC. London, England.
- Carlsen, Robert (1 April 2011). The War for the Heart and Soul of a Highland Maya Town (Revised ed.). Austin, Texas: University of Texas Press. ISBN 978-0-292-72398-6.
- CEUR (2009). "En pie de lucha: Organización y represión en la Universidad de San Carlos, Guatemala 1944 a 1996". Centro de Estudios Urbanos y Regionales, Universidad de San Carlos (in Spanish). Archived from the original on 11 March 2009.
- CIA (April 1981). "Guatemalan Soldiers Kill Civilians in Cocob" (PDF). CIA Secret Cable.
- CIDH (n.d.). "Guatemala 1981 – Chapter IX". Cidh.oas.org.
- Comisión para el Esclarecimiento Histórico: Vol. IV (1999). "Atentados contra sedes municipales". Guatemala: Memoria del Silencio (in Spanish). Programa de Ciencia y Derechos Humanos, Asociación Americana del Avance de la Ciencia. Archived from the original (Online edition) on 22 April 2005.
- Comisión para el Esclarecimiento Histórico: Agudización (1999). "Agudización de la Violencia y Militarización del Estado (1979–1985)". Guatemala: Memoria del Silencio (in Spanish). Archived from the original on 6 May 2013.
- Concerned Guatemala Scholars (1982). Guatemala, Dare to Struggle, Dare to Win (Revised ed.). Concerned Guatemala Scholars.
- Cultural Survival (n.d.). "The Social Consequences of "Development" Aid in Guatemala". Cultural Survival.
- "Murió en Puerto La Cruz ex dictador guatemalteco". El Nacional Newspaper (in Spanish). Caracas, Venezuela. 2006.
- El Periódico (31 January 2012). "Quema de embajada española". elPeriódico. Guatemala. Archived from the original on 30 October 2013.
- Fried, Jonathan L. (1983). Guatemala in rebellion: unfinished history. Grove Press.
- Garrard-Burnett, Virginia (2010). Terror in the Land of the Holy Spirit: Guatemala under General Efraín Ríos Mont. Oxford: Oxford University Press. ISBN 978-0-19-537964-8.
- Handy, Jim (1994). Revolution in the countryside: rural conflict and agrarian reform in Guatemala, 1944–1954. University of North Carolina Press. ISBN 978-0-8078-4438-0.
- IEPALA (1980). Guatemala, un futuro próximo (in Spanish). Madrid: Artigrafía - Instituto de Estudios Políticos para América Latina y Africa. ISBN 9788485436101.
- García, Jody (31 January 2013). "Una crónica impactante en el aniversario de la quema de la Embajada de España tras 33 años de impunidad". Diario La Hora. Guatemala. Archived from the original on 7 December 2013.
- "Entrevista completa Ríos Montt: Yo controlo al ejército". Justice Republic (in Spanish). 11 May 2013. Archived from the original on 2021-12-22 – via YouTube.
- La otra memoria histórica (5 December 2011). "Guatemala, viudas y huérfanos que dejó el comunismo". La otra memoria histórica (in Spanish). Guatemala. Archived from the original on 7 December 2013.
- McCleary, Rachel (1999). Dictating Democracy: Guatemala and the End of Violent Revolution (Illustrated ed.). University Press of Florida. ISBN 978-0-8130-1726-6.
- Mendizábal P., Ana Beatriz (1978). "Estado y Políticas de Desarrollo Agrario. La Masacre Campesina de Panzós" (PDF). Escuela de Ciencia Política (in Spanish). Universidad de San Carlos de Guatemala. Archived from the original (PDF) on 2014-05-27.
- Molina Mejía (2007). "Recordando el 14 julio de 1980" (in Spanish). Archived from the original on 4 July 2010.
- Platero Trabanino, Oscar German (2013). "La farsa del genocidio en Guatemala" (PDF). Fundación Contra el Terrorismo (in Spanish). Guatemala: Mi ejército, sitio oficial.
- "Avalancha terrorista en contra de la manifestación de mañana; poder público y transporte extraurbano blancos de ataque". Prensa Libre. Guatemala. 6 September 1980.
- Rakosy, Betsy (23 May 2002). "Victimization – the EXMIBAL Story". MAC: Mines and communities. Archived from the original on 6 October 2014.
- Ramcharan, B.G. (1985). The Right to Life in International Law. Hague Academy of International Law, Center for Studies and Research. p. 337.
- Richards, Michael (1985). "Cosmopolitan world-view and counterinsurgency in Guatemala". Anthropological Quarterly. 58 (3): 94. doi:10.2307/3317916. JSTOR 3317916.
- Solano, Luis (2012). Contextualización histórica de la Franja Transversal del Norte (FTN) (PDF). Centro de Estudios y Documentación de la Frontera Occidental de Guatemala, CEDFOG. Archived from the original (PDF) on 13 November 2014.
- "Gen. Romeo Lucas García, 85, Former Guatemalan President, Dies". The New York Times. 2006.
- Velásquez, S. (8 August 1997). "Crímenes de la Guerrilla" (PDF). Revista Crónica (in Spanish). Guatemala.
- Vice President's Task Force on Combating Terrorism (1989). Terrorist Group Profiles (Illustrated ed.). DIANE. p. 86. ISBN 978-1-56806-864-0.
- Violence and Genocide in Guatemala Yale University

Government offices
Preceded by Kjell Laugerud	President of Guatemala; 1978–1982	Succeeded by Efraín Ríos Montt
