= Revolutionary Party (Guatemala) =

Defunct political party in Guatemala

Revolutionary Party Partido Revolucionario
- President: Jorge Serrano Elías (last)
- Founded: 1957
- Dissolved: August 24, 1995
- Succeeded by: Democratic Front New Guatemala (legally)
- Headquarters: Guatemala City
- Membership (1966): 50,000
- Ideology: Centrism; Liberal conservatism Social democracy (formerly); Anti-communism; Reformism
- Political position: Centre-left (1957–1970s); Centre-right (1970s–1990)
- Colors: Yellow-brown, white, blue

The Revolutionary Party (Spanish: Partido Revolucionario, PR) was the ruling Guatemalan political party from 1966 to 1970.

The party was founded in 1957 by Mario Méndez Montenegro and saw itself as the heir of the Guatemalan Revolution of 1944. It was on the moderate left, but its opponents claimed that during the early 1960s, the country's communists adopted a policy of entryism towards the PR, which was used as justification for the coup of Enrique Peralta Azurdia.

Despite this the PR survived the coup and contested the 1966 general election, managing to gain the 50,000 members required by the military government in order to be allowed to run. Montenegro was initially chosen as their presidential candidate and agreed to an alliance with the military-backed Institutional Democratic Party (PID). However prior to the vote, Montenegro died and was replaced as candidate by his brother, Julio César Méndez Montenegro, a more committed reformer who repudiated the alliance with the military.

The younger Montenegro brother was duly elected as president, but his promised reforms were implemented poorly as despite his repudiation of any alliance, the military remained too powerful a check on his ambitions. Alongside this the government was also blighted by violence from the far right National Liberation Movement, who would go on to be the PID's running mates in their successful 1970 election campaign.

The PR remained an important opposition force despite not regaining the presidency, but in the later 1970s, the party moved to the right and became more well disposed towards the military to the point that they were the Institutional Democratic Party's running mates in the 1978 general election which saw Fernando Romeo Lucas García elected as president.

Francisco Villagrán Kramer became vice-president, hoping that the PR's entrance into a coalition with the pro-military party would provide a moderate counterweight but resigned in 1980 and left for the United States after disagreements within the government. Nevertheless, the coalition was maintained for 1982 when it backed Ángel Aníbal Guevara, who won a fraudulent election. The blatant fraud was one of the factors triggering a military coup which placed Efraín Ríos Montt in power.

In Constitutional Assembly elections in 1984, the PR won 10 seats. In 1985, the PR formed an alliance with the Democratic Party of National Conciliation and backed Jorge Serrano Elias in the presidential race. Serrano placed third and the alliance won 11 seats in Congress. The PR lost its influence to the point that when the 1990 election was held, the party captured only one seat in the Congress. That seat was subsequently lost and the PR faded from Guatemalan politics.
