= CIA activities in Guatemala =

History of CIA interference in Guatemala

The U.S. Central Intelligence Agency (CIA) has a history of interference in the government of Guatemala over the course of several decades. Guatemala is bordered by the North Pacific Ocean and the Gulf of Honduras (also known as the Caribbean Sea). The four bordering countries are Mexico, El Salvador, Honduras and Belize. Due to the proximity of Guatemala to the United States, the fear of the Soviet Union creating a beachhead in Guatemala created panic in the United States government during the Cold War. In an interview, Howard Hunt, CIA Chief, Mexico, stated that "We were faced here with the obvious intervention of a foreign power, because these home grown parties, are not really home grown, they are being funded...or advised by a foreign power, i.e. the Soviet Union." The CIA undertook Operation PBSuccess to overthrow the democratically elected Jacobo Árbenz in the 1954 Guatemalan coup d'état. Carlos Castillo Armas replaced him as a military dictator. Guatemala was subsequently ruled by a series of military dictatorships for decades.

Between 1962 and 1996, Left-wing guerrillas fought the U.S. backed military governments during the Guatemalan Civil War.

According to the George Washington University's "The National Security Archive," there are still over 100,000 pages of documents on CIA activities in Guatemala that have not been released. The multitude of documents showed a consistent line of communication between Guatemala station and CIA headquarters building to a possible coup attempt against Arbenz.

== The Rise of Communism in Guatemala ==
Communist influence within Guatemala was a slow rise utilizing labor and politics, propaganda and fear. After the 1944 Guatemalan Revolution and the overthrow of dictator Jorge Ubico by leftist-nationalists, small communist groups began to emerge and become public. Largely disregarded and detested, communism took on new life during the mid 1940s and challenged the political and labor scene. Beginning with the induction of the Confederacion de Trabajadores de Guatemala (CTG) in 1945, the communist influence took hold within the labor federations. Needing experienced and established advisors the nation looked internationally to employ leaders who would guide Guatemalan labor movements; opening the door for communist consultants and eventually using the CTG as a communist indoctrination center. Exploiting laws and finding weaknesses within Guatemalan politics, communism could be found in most areas of the government and thus, establishing a pro-communist foundation in Congress, legislators, and the Supreme Court.

Beyond politics, propaganda became essential for communism to spread into Guatemala as it was a new and unknown political scope. Radio stations, newscasts, and public commentaries all served as vehicles for delivering communist ideas. Encouraging the overthrow of "colonial imperialism," radio broadcasts such as The Belize Hour operated on an uncensored basis and promoted free speech. Communist influence found its way into cartoons and posters, using themes of Congressional infiltration and the solidarity Guatemalan people had for North Korea after the Korean war during the 1950s. The sphere of communism became officially recognized when a signed press statement from the "Secretary General of the Partido, Comunista de Guatemala," Jose Manuel Fortuny admitted to the existence of a communist regime in Guatemala, in place since 1947.

=== The Possible Soviet Intervention ===
The rise of communism in Guatemala was not connected to U.S.S.R. due to statements from Nikolai Leonov the former KGB intelligence officer in charge of Central American intelligence as well as push back by the Soviet union and Guatemalan ambassadors in the UN in reaction to U.S. accusations of Soviet Intervention within The Guatemalan government.

The only meaningful support from the Soviet Union was a shipment of old Nazi weaponry that had been captured by Czech Resistance. This shipment of weaponry was one of the first shipments weapons to Central American nation This shipment of weaponry by the Soviet Union became a mark of Soviet meddling within Central America and was seen as a threat by The CIA and American officials. The thought of possible Soviet influence at this time was inconceivable due to the sudden instability of the Soviet Union By the death of Joseph Stalin on March 5, 1953.

The Soviet Union also walked carefully around the conservative nature Arbenz's administration. The Soviet Union did not intervene or give aid to Arbenz's Government during the mission of PCSuccess even during the pleading of Guatemalan ambassadors to the Soviet Union.

== Revelations secured through Freedom of Information Requests ==
On May 23, 1997, CIA released 1,400 pages of the 100,000 secret archives on the CIA's involvement in the 1954 Guatemalan coup d'état in response to numerous FOIA requests from the National Security Archive, a non-for-profit research organization and archive located on the campus of George Washington University. The release of these classified documents came a full five years after the announcement by the CIA director, Robert Gates, that the CIA would declassify and release information on its post Cold War history. Coincidentally, the CIA released the documents "only days after a member of the CIA's own historical review panel was quoted in The New York Times as calling the CIA's commitment to openness 'a brilliant public relations snow job.'" The released documents cover the CIA's thought on the intentions of Guatemalan president Jacobo Árbenz. He was elected in 1950, "to continue a process of socio-economic reforms... [are disdainfully referred to by the CIA] in its memoranda as 'an intensely nationalistic program of progress colored by the touchy, anti-foreign inferiority complex of the 'Banana Republic'".

Along with the release of classified CIA documents and information regarding the operations PBFORTUNE and PBSUCCESS, was information about the perceived threat within Guatemala. CIA classified information collected in 1952 displayed the details of the activities within Guatemala. After noting that the information had not been officially evaluated, the document highlighted the Communist Party in Guatemala, noting that there were perceived to be "roughly 500 men scattered throughout Guatemala, headed by a commander, whose name is closely guarded."

While in office Arbenz created an active alliance with the Communist. The policies in which Arbenz was implementing in Guatemala, were damaging to the relationship with the United States. The United States realized that a hostile government in Guatemala was taking form. Although it did not seem like a direct to US security, an intervention needed to be devised to keep the Soviets out of the Western Hemisphere. This supposed attack on the US and the Communist Party was not widely known or accepted. It was a theory that if the Communist party was growing in Guatemala, it would be a greater threat to the US, due to the close geographical location. In a documentary entitled "Arbenz and the CIA, (Guatemala, 1950s)," a KGB Officer, Nikolai Leonov, explained that the Guatemalan Communist threat was not rooted in reality. That is, Leonov claimed that the Arbenz political party did not utilize "any logistical support from the Soviet Union." He further explained that the two did not have diplomatic relations and dispelled the notion that the Soviets were infiltrating Guatemala.

According to staff historian Gerald Haines' 1995 report, concern was growing over Jacobo Arbenz's left-leaning policies and his shift towards communism. The United States government was fearful that the political movements of the Arbenz administration and the allowing of the communist party within Guatemala would create an easy access for the Soviet Union to infiltrate the US.

The Guatemalan Revolution of 1944-54 had overthrown the US-backed dictator Jorge Ubico, and brought a popular leftist government to power. Although most high-level US officials recognized that a hostile government in Guatemala by itself did not constitute a direct security threat to the United States, they claimed to view events there in the context of the growing Cold War struggle with the Soviet Union and feared Guatemala could reduce the influence of US corporations (such as United Fruit) in the region, and thus reduce US influence. Decree 900, passed on 7 August 1952, among other things, sought to increase Guatemala's autonomy and create a successful example of land reform in Central America. The decree aimed to redistribute land from large estates, including those owned by the United Fruit Company, to landless peasants. This move threatened the economic interests of powerful landowners and corporations, prompting opposition from both domestic and international quarters.

Members of the CIA had further interest in Guatemala and further incentive to assist United Fruit. The current U.S. Secretary of State, John Foster Dulles, was also a member of the law firm Sullivan and Cromwell, which represented United Fruit. Director Allen Dulles was a board member of United Fruit, and the brother of the Assistant Secretary of State for Inter-American Affairs, John Moors Cabot, had once been president of United Fruit. Ed Whitman, who was United Fruit's principal lobbyist, was married to President Eisenhower's personal secretary, Ann C. Whitman. These are simply a few of the individuals who influenced U.S. foreign policy towards Guatemala that had ties to the United Fruit Company. Dulles received direct communications from contacts in Guatemala. This FOIA revelation is interesting because it shows the operational strategy of Dulles. When direct communications from another country aren't delegated for someone else to read, the shows that the Director of the CIA had a more direct (pun intended) role in operational planning. A paper trail leading to the director also prevented deniability from the CIA if the operation was not successful.

The head of the CIA, Director of Central Intelligence (DCI) Walter Bedell Smith called for Immediate action. They were of the view that without foreign support and assistance from US, "the Guatemalan opposition would remain inept", disorganized and inefficient. The anti-communist elements—the Catholic hierarchy, landowners, business interests, the railway workers union, university students and the army were prepared to prevent communism, but apart from the US they had little outside support. In contrast to Smith, and as stated in the document "CIA and Guatemala Assassination Proposals 1952-1954", "other US officials, especially in the US Department of State, urged a more cautious approach. The Bureau of Inter-American Affairs, for example, did not want to present 'the spectacle of the elephant shaking with alarm before the mouse'". The Bureau of Inter-American Affairs advocated for a policy that focused on "firm persuasion with the withholding of virtually all cooperative assistance, and the concluding of military defense assistance pacts, with El Salvador, Nicaragua, and Honduras. Ultimately, the Truman administration adopted the Department of State position [as]… the official public US policy"; however, "the CIA assessment…had support within the Truman administration as well".

According to reports later declassified by the CIA in 1995, the democratically elected president of the country, President Jacobo Árbenz, made attempts to institute a working relationship with Guatemalan communists soon after he was sworn in to office. However, after the success of PBSUCCESS, Frank Wisner's investigation under operation PBHISTORY would establish that, the event which unfolded under Arbenz in Guatemala happened so without Soviet involvement or backing. As it was an internal revolution. The coup was considered primarily as a deterrent against fears regarding the possibility of a Soviet beachhead in the Western Hemisphere, from which the USSR could conceivably be able to fire mid-range ballistic missiles at the United States.

The CIA's Historical analysis department prepared a report outlining how to overthrow the Guatemalan government. The first CIA effort to overthrow Árbenz—a CIA collaboration with Nicaraguan dictator, Anastasio Somoza, to support a "disgruntled" general named Carlos Castillo Armas, and codenamed the Operation as PBSUCCESS—was authorized by U.S. President Truman in 1952. The plans to overthrow Arbenz were more ambitious than the operations that removed Mossadeq in Iran.

Armas had been on the CIA's radar for a few years prior to this. In August 1950, a report discussed an earlier plan, hatched by Armas, to lead an armed revolt against the government. Recent released documents have shown Armas's quest to recruit political dissidents. Other documents from Armas give insight into his ideas for the coup strategy. Armas listed specific zones of Military command, bases, and units that would support and oppose his coup. For bases that he thought would resist, he planned direct action against them in addition to the palace. There was also assumptions made that he could influence sabotage in units he couldn't fully recruit. The most valuable insight to the geopolitics of the area involves Armas making a note about a possible intervention from Mexico or Cuba if the fighting was prolonged. If the president used regional allies, this story would be very different. The report even considered his character, noting that he was "a quiet, soft-spoken officer who does not seem to be given to exaggeration." As early as February of that year, CIA Headquarters began generating memos with subject titles such as "Guatemalan Communist Personnel to be disposed of during Military Operations," outlining categories of persons to be neutralized "through Executive Action"—murder—or through imprisonment and exile. Enlisting methods such as paramilitary and psychological actions, the CIA expanded its procedure of removing political leaders beyond that of the coup d’etat in Iran in 1953. The hope of this list was to create an anti-communist coup. Another similar memo requested a list of all communists and all communist sympathizers who would be "encarcerated immediately in event of successful anti-communist coup," which would contribute to the violence and civil unrest in Guatemala following the coup.

== Operation PBFortune ==
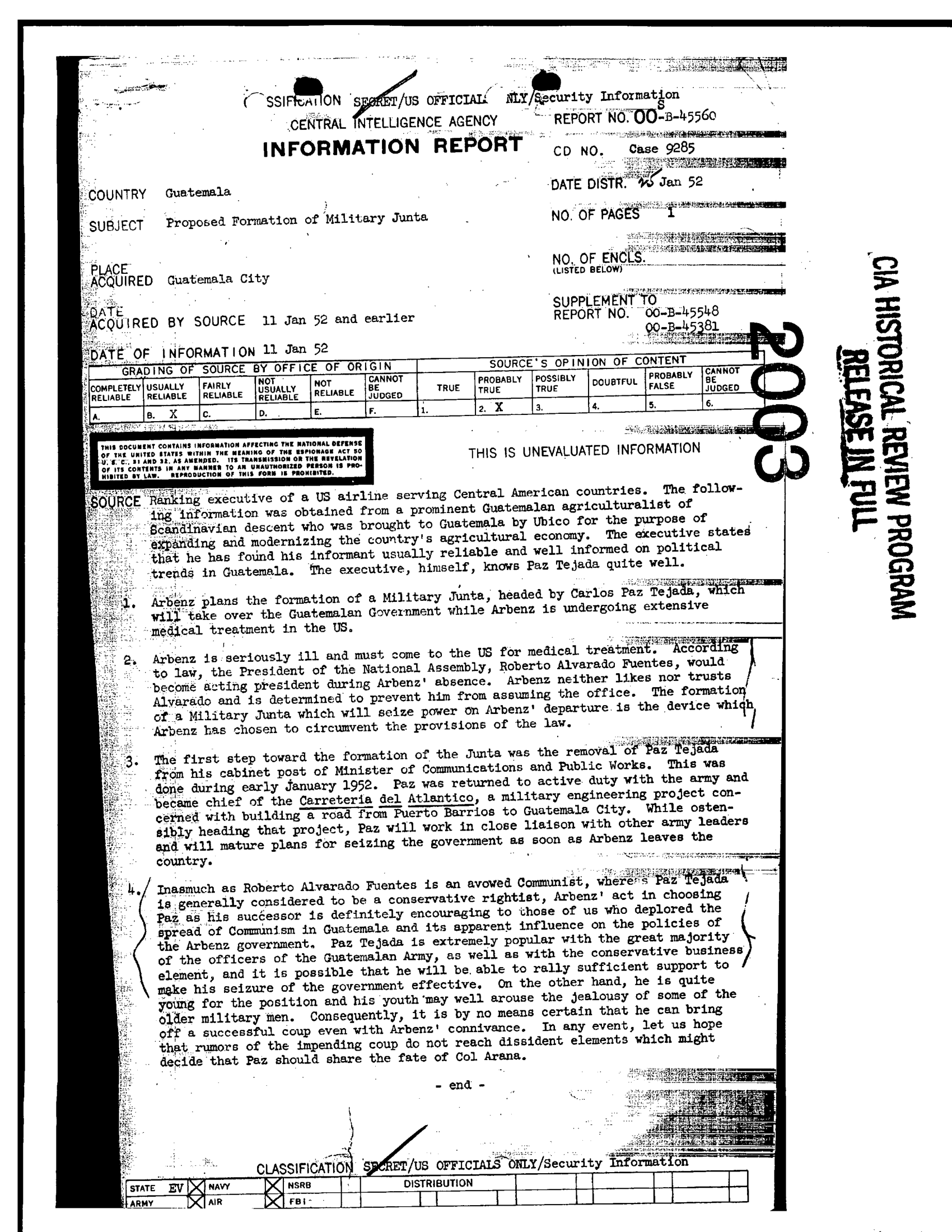
CIA memo regarding Arbenz's health: "PROPOSED FORMATION OF MILITARY JUNTA".

On January 11, 1952, a memorandum for the deputy director titled “Estimate of Situation in Guatemala” gave a start to a plan by providing information regarding the communist activities and anti-communist activities. Part of this letter gave names of three exile groups who were plotting against Arbenz. Not only was Arbenz was of concern but Roberto Alvenado Fuentes, president of the Guatemalan congress. Rumors that Arbenz had leukemia were a concern since, if Arbenz left office, Fuentes would take his place, whom this memorandum described as a “strong communist supporter.” A declassified CIA document with information dated from before January 11, 1952, revealed that the CIA had received intel substantiating the rumor about Arbenz's health, stating, "Arbenz is seriously ill and must come to the US for medical treatment." The same document claimed that, to prevent Fuentes from gaining power in his absence, Arbenz had organized a military junta to seize power while he would be receiving treatment in America. However, on January 25, 1952 the CIA gained intel that Arbenz was in good health.

In April 1952, Nicaraguan President Anastasio Somoza visited the United States and expressed confidence in his ability to overthrow Arbenz. The Nicaraguan dictator mentioned that, given arms and supplies, he could orchestrate Arbenz’s overthrow with the help of the Guatemalan exile Carlos Castillo Armas. Armas and his group were mentioned as one of the exiled groups in the memorandum "Estimate of Situation in Guatemala." His hubris caught the attention of the US government, who had already been conceiving ideas on how to deal with a possible uprising of communism in Guatemala, "in America’s back yard". President Truman contacted Director of Central Intelligence Walter Bedell Smith to explore options with Armas. Smith ordered an agent codenamed “Seekford” to make contact with Armas about possible action.

After a report came back to the CIA from Seekford, Deputy Director Allen Dulles drafted a formal proposal to overthrow the Guatemalan president. On September 9, 1952, President Truman authorized the operation PBFORTUNE with a budget of $225,000.The plan also enlisted arms and air support from Nicaragua and Honduras to aid Carlos Castillo Armas.

A couple of months of planning went into creating a list of officials to be targeted for assassination. The plan relied on a 1949 Guatemalan Army list of Communists in tandem with the CIA’s own intelligence. Armas also provided his own list of 58 Guatemalans to be killed. On September 18, 1952, Seekford received contact from General Rafael Trujillo, the dictator of the Dominican Republic, who agreed to aid the operations. Armas began training a special operative team to carry out the overthrow of the Arbenz government. However, the cover was blown and the plan was terminated before it could be carried out. In the later months of 1952, shortly after Operation PBFortune was terminated, the CIA continued to monitor events in Guatemala and collected information that suggested assassination plots were still being concocted by Guatemalan dissidents.

In December 1952, the Guatemalan Communist Party was legalized in the country, and workers at the United Fruit's Tiquisate plantation filed for seizure of around 50,000 acres of land. The United Fruit company, a US company, had seized half a million acres of land in Guatemala, leaving little land for local Guatemalans for housing and other uses. Likewise, United Fruit also had great control over the railroads, the ports, and telecommunications. The idea of assassinations was mentioned, but only at a general level. Conversations between an opposition leader in Guatemala and CIA agent Seekford confirmed that Armas was still planning assassinations of political and military leaders. Armas had developed special “K” groups with the objective of killing all political and military leaders associated with Arbenz. It was also reported that Nicaraguan, Honduran, and Salvadorian soldiers wearing civilian clothes planned to assassinate Communist leaders.

== Operation PBSuccess ==
By 1953, Arbenz was feared to be moving closer to the Communists, as evidenced by his expropriation of additional United Fruit Company holdings, legalizing the Guatemalan Communist Party, the PGT, and suppression of anti-Communist opposition following a failed uprising in Salama, which is believed to be another CIA operation. On February 25, 1953, NSC 144/1 warned "of a drift in the area toward radical and nationalistic regimes."

On March 12, 1953, communication was made within the CIA regarding Guatemala's major export and the economics behind it. It was found that the countries major export was coffee and that it made up 82% of the $87,000,000 in income. 83.3% of that export was to the United States. In the communication it was proposed that if it came to it they could sabotage the export system which would greatly reduce the country's income and foreign exchange. The document obtained listed multiple ways this plan of action could be executed. This option would limit bloodshed and curtail the country's economy.

According to Document Number: 0000141590, in a memo of five points appraising the situation in Guatemala, on March 27, 1953, an unnamed source describes how three countries (El Salvador, Honduras, and Nicaragua) were actively calling up reserves and sending them to the Guatemalan border. The memo says they expect heavy casualties as they send troops along the main highway from El Salvador, but they did not expect the main Guatemalan force to leave its capital for fear of an "anti-commie" uprising. The memo finally mentions that foreign diplomats and personnel were discussing the necessity for invasion of Guatemala. The reserves talked about in the document were called up beginning in 1948 and trained on the weekends. The actions, were they to happen, were to take place during the Holy Week.

In another document from earlier in March 1953 a young attorney by the name of Luis Beltranena asked if the U.S. Government was aware of the situation in Guatemala. He represented several anti-communist groups within the country seeking a "green light" of support to overthrow the current government. He then goes on to ask for not only a more supportive Mexican ambassador but also a younger, "Less hyper-cautious American ambassador, a church going catholic preferably not Irish catholic." (Document Number: 00009149570)

PBFORTUNE was terminated and in August 1953, President Eisenhower authorized a new operation with a $2.7 million dollar budget, operation PBSUCCESS. Although the operation was designed, “to remove covertly, and without bloodshed if possible, the menace of the present Communist-controlled government of Guatemala,” by means of “psychological warfare, political action, and subversion.” The mention of assassination was not mentioned in the overall plan. New developments in early 1953 proposed the use of “sabotage, defection, penetration, and propaganda efforts” to topple the Guatemalan government and military. Armas had plans to persuade the Guatemalan army to defect as well. The CIA conducted Operation PBSuccess, the 1954 coup d'état in Guatemala. It also entailed an agreement between President Eisenhower and the Dulles Brothers to remove President Arbenz from office. John Foster Dulles (who would eventually become the United States Secretary of State) was serving at the time as a lawyer for the United Fruit Company, a US corporation with vast business interests in Central America, while his brother Allen Dulles was the acting director of the CIA. The United States then wanted to install Colonel Castillo Armas in Arbenz' place. To accomplish these ends, the United States sought to promote a propaganda "terror campaign" in order to terrify and demoralize both Arbenz and his troops. The last stage of the operation called for the rounding up of Communists and collaborators, which did result in the deaths of hundreds of Guatemalans once Armas was in power.

In addition to the propaganda campaign against President Arbenz, the United States began to strafe the capital city with air raids, eventually leading to Arbenz' own forced resignation as President. The CIA understood Operation PBSuccess as having "marked an early zenith" in the CIA's covert history. PBSuccess included plans for psychological warfare, target lists for assassinations of Guatemalan leaders, economic aid to rebel groups (Armas, junta groups, etc.), diplomatic action, and paramilitary action. Part of the psychological warfare included sending death notifications or "death notice cards" to known or suspected communist leaders for 30 consecutive days. The CIA also developed the Sherwood Program, a clandestine radio-broadcast campaign, to be used during the later stages of PBSuccess. The program's goal was to psychologically condition its target audience during the pre-attack period, convince it that the anti-communists were successful during the attack, and encourage underground partisan cells to organize against the Guatemalan government. Santa Fe Island was chosen as the broadcast site, where 15 natives and 10 U.S. Weather Bureau/CAA personal resided. At least 14 recordings were made for the Sherwood Program. The one-month campaigns in April and June produced no apparent results. "The Nerve War Against Individuals" also included other threats to create paranoia and sense of impending doom. The established sabotage teams or harassment teams were meant to attack local communist leaders and their property. Following that order, they sent Guatemalan leaders coffins, nooses, and faux bombs to intimidate them. The teams painted propaganda on their houses to disseminate fear (i.e. "You Have Only 5 Days") or attempted to mark them falsely as a traitor to the party so that they would be targeted by Arbenz (i.e. "Here Lives a Spy").

Commentators noted that the Arbenz government was not communist, but progressive and reformist, and the US coup stemmed from American business self-interest, mainly in the fruit sector. Within the historical analyst report about the Operation PBSuccess, Cullather states, "Agency officials had only a dim idea of what occurred before Jacobo Arbenz Guzman came into power".

While the assassinations were planned out, there was no actual mention of assassinations in the original plan; the want for these assassinations became known during the training phase. The plan of PBSuccess was to try to remove the Guatemalan government without the use of assassination. The CIA and State Department were torn on whether or not assassinations would be necessary to complete this mission. A memo from the Western Hemisphere division suggested assassinating key Guatemalan military officers if they refused to join the rebellion against Arbenz.

Around this time of operation PBSuccess, the agency published training files on the "Study of Assassination", which was a 19-page manual offering detailed descriptions regarding the art of political killing. The manual stated that the most efficient tools of assassination's were simple local tools, such as hammers, screw drivers, axes, or anything heavy and useful. Trujillo's trained pistoleros would be utilized in order to eliminate the top leaders of Guatemala. An elaborate plan was created that laid everything leading up until D-Day. PBSuccess also included a sixth stage, that being plans to remove opposition after a successful coup also. PBHistory was the final phase of the operation that was to obtain documentation left behind by President Arbenz's administration. Frank Wisner wanted to take every opportunity he could to try to expose Soviet connections to the Western hemisphere which included trying to show the communist qualities of the Arbenz rule. The Army and Castillo Arma's junta were able to obtain around 150,000 documents; however, very few of these actually showed a connection to the Soviets. Later, examination of said documents had found no proof of possible Soviet control within Guatemala, only Guatemalan communists had been acting on their own. Agents created a booklet containing the obtained documents which specifically showed photographs of Arbenz's library filled with Marxist texts, Chinese communists materials, and a copy of Stalin's biography, as well as evidence of an attempt to purchase weapons from Italy along with cables from Arbenz that contained strong communist influences. This booklet was then circulated to the National Security Council (NSC), members of the Senate and other officials whom had shown interest. The NSC was unimpressed by the material and required more incriminating evidence on Arbenz.

However, despite the lack of historical content, CIA officials claim Operation PBSuccess to be a success and is remembered as a "revolutionary progress that have been set in motion for over a decade." After the operation, David Atlee Phillips ordered the CIA's Guatemalan station to destroy any evidence of PBSuccess, including most of the documents about the details of the operation. The operation was successful in that President Arbenz was overthrown, however the CIA failed to install a sufficient replacement.

== 1954 ==
On June 27, 1954, President Arbenz resigned from office and fled to the Mexican embassy in Guatemala City and later allowed to leave to Mexico for political asylum. Armas was the new president. Arbenz, in addition to 120 other government officials or Communists, we granted to leave Guatemala under a safe passage. This was an agreement made with the new Guatemalan president, Armas. Human rights group estimated that between the year of 1954 and 1990, more than 100,000 civilians were murdered by the successive military regimes.

"Discussion of whether to assassinate Guatemalans....took place in a historical era quite different from the present. In the documents, however, was an unsigned, undated technical discussion of assassination. In compliance with the "Openness" program of 1995, which deals with whether or not to openly share information of ethic dilemma proportions, a CIA staff historian, George Haines, was assigned to write a brief history of CIA activities in Guatemala. In declassified documents, there's an unsigned, undated technical discussion of assassination. According to a CIA staff historian, George Haines, the CIA began collecting names of possible assassination targets within the Arbenz government as early as January 1952. The documents revealed discussions on creating lists of individuals deemed strategically important for removal through "executive action." These names were deleted in the declassified documents, taking away any verification of their survival pre/post-coup. The CIA also engaged in psychological warfare, using mourning cards to threaten communist political figures as a precursor to potential assassinations.

Two declassified CIA documents reveal such a discussion of assassination of the Guatemalans. The first document, from March 1954 refers to a list requested by an unknown CIA official of government officials, members of the Communist Party, and others "of tactical importance whose removal for psychological, organizational or others reasons is mandatory for the success of military action" and asks for a final list to be narrowed down for "disposal" by the Junta group, though the names of any individuals, CIA, Guatemalan, or otherwise, were withheld. The conditions for selecting names to add to the list were broken down into three conditions: the target had to be, a Communist driven politician who was not outwardly supportive of Communism, a public Communist whose elimination was necessary for the success of the future government, or a military target whose elimination was necessary for certain military actions. The memorandum was addressed to "All Staff Officers,"and included instructions for its circulation, requesting input ("Your careful consideration is requested in making additions or deletions"), so that the "planning [could] proceed on schedule." Psychological warfare was also brought upon the individuals on this list.

Mourning cards were used in an attempt to scare off the communist leaders and supporters. These cards threatened communist political figures and were meant to foreshadow their assassinations. The dissident leaders wanted to take the psychological warfare in a more violent direction at one point, recommending that eliminating a top communist official would help the resistance movement. The CIA advised against this and said that it would not be beneficial to resistance and that it would "set off wholesale reprisals". The second document from an unspecified date (though after February 1952, according to point 2) introduces a list of "Guatemalan Communist Personnel to be disposed of [...] by Calligeris." The list was split into two categories, Category I and Category II, Category I was a list of people to be taken out by means of executive action and Category II which was individuals selected to be imprisoned or exiled.

Of the two categories, 58 individuals (names withheld) to be disposed of through "Executive action" and 74 individuals to be imprisoned or exiled. A description of this second document found on the National Security Archive webpage by Kate Doyle and Peter Kornbluh notes that the "Executive action" for members of the first category likely means "killed"; however, this information cannot be verified through these documents. This description also states that "Calligeris" was the code-name given to Castillo Armas by the CIA. The Guatemalan exiles that were trained in Honduras were led by Carlos Armas and later Carlos Diaz agreed to lead the group against Arbenz. Castillo Armas' CIA-supported force entered Guatemala on June 16, 1954.

The United Nations met in emergency session on June 18, 1954. The United States Ambassador to the UN, Henry Cabot Lodge, denied US involvement in the attacks. He issued a warning to the Soviet Union to, "Stay out of this hemisphere! And don't try to start your plans and your conspiracies over here." This deflection was done to cast suspicion on communist influences in the region as a reason for the conflict, although Árbenz was not a communist himself.

Despite the intense focus on assassination, the Árbenz coup would be relatively bloodless, with less than 200 people killed overall Árbenz would be forced to seek asylum in the Mexican embassy of Guatemala City on June 27, 1954, where he stayed until he and 120 other Guatemalan officials would leave Guatemala under a safe passage agreement with the new Armas' government. There is no evidence that any executions orchestrated by the CIA were carried out.

In addition to these documents, training files for PBSuccess also included an unsigned, undated manual for assassination that described methods, tools, and procedures for killing. In nineteen pages, now-anonymous drafters offered advice such as "The simplest local tools are often much the most efficient means of assassination," and "falls before trains or subway cars are usually effective, but require exact timing and can seldom be free from unexpected observation."

Árbenz was elected without a secret ballot. His land reform was ruled unconstitutional by the Supreme Court, which he then purged. He also received arms from the Soviet bloc. The CIA claimed it intervened because it feared that a communist government would become "a Soviet beachhead in the Western Hemisphere;" however, it was also protecting, among others, four hundred thousand acres of land the United Fruit Company had acquired. In truth this was more about protecting big business than it was with stopping communism. Guatemala's official 1999 truth commission accused Árbenz of being involved in the deaths of several hundred political opponents.

In June 1954, Armas' with CIA-backed forces went into Guatemala. As well as external CIA-backed forces, there were also internal groups of peasants and exiles mobilized by the CIA to help with the CIA's mission. A representative met with the Guatemalan military commander to see if he would lead a coup against Árbenz. The military did not act at this time, as it had its own agenda and wanted a target to be eliminated. The CIA requested permission to bomb an unknown target, but it was never granted before Árbenz resigned himself. Although the CIA's operations were a failure, the Árbenz regime suddenly collapsed without any significant violence when the Guatemalan military turned against it. The lack of actual violence was significant due to the possibility of a much larger, much bloodier revolution to dispose Arbenz. This not only included civil unrest inside Guatemala, but also action done by the U.S. government. On two occasions, CIA officers demanded a stronger U.S. presence on the ground. An unnamed dissident leader called for the creation of a covert action group to perform "violent, illegal acts" against the Guatemalan government, as well proposing an extermination a top-tier communist leader. Another officer radioed to LINCOLN station to request a bombing of a Guatemalan city, his message ending in "Bomb Repeat Bomb".

Following the appointment of John Peurifoy to the post of Ambassador to Guatemala in 1953, Peurifoy used his governmental influence in Guatemala to spur on rebellion against the Arbenz government, and helping funnel money and weapons to the rebels supporting Castillo. Lastly, Peurifoy, expecting a violent revolution, suggested that American citizens be evacuated from Guatemala. Toreillo pleaded with Peurifoy to not carry out this idea, for he believed that the presence of American citizens limited violence in Guatemala, and with their evacuation there would be an increase in civil violence in Guatemala. Therefore, it demonstrates the way in which the State Department was cooperating with the CIA to funnel money and weapons into a South American country to support a pro-Western dictator, a strategy that would become common for the State Department and CIA throughout the Cold War. In the eleven days after the resignation of President Árbenz, five successive military junta governments occupied the Guatemalan presidential palace; each junta was successively more amenable to the political demands of the U.S., after which, Colonel Carlos Castillo Armas assumed the Presidency of Guatemala on September 1, 1954.

CIA historian Nicholas Cullather stated that the success of PBSuccess "confirmed the belief of many in the Eisenhower administration that covert operations offered a safe, inexpensive substitute for armed force in resisting Communist inroads in the Third World." These operations would be carried out throughout Latin America for the next thirty years, resulting in massive loss of life for civilians caught in the crossfire of the Cold War. The aftermath of the CIA-backed coup led to significant human rights violations in Guatemala. Estimates from human rights groups suggest that between 1954 and 1990, over 100,000 civilians were killed by successive military regimes. The violence and repression targeted not only government officials but also perceived supporters of the previous regime, contributing to a prolonged period of political instability and violence in the country.

A retrospective CIA memorandum from 1975 confirms the agency's role in the overthrow of President Árbenz, including air support, the training of anti-Árbenz guerrillas, the fabrication of Soviet weapons shipments, and clandestine propaganda operations intended to "intimidate members of the Communist Party and public officials who were sympathetic to the Communist cause. The radio station, prior to D-day, broadcast programs on why they were on the air; dramatized examples of Communist tyranny; the ideologies and aims of the Liberation Movement and what effect was intended vis-à-vis each individual who was listening; an aggressive program outlining the activities which would ultimately bring down the Communist threat, etc."

The memorandum also provides a detailed cost breakdown of how $3 million USD in CIA funds were allocated for operations in Guatemala:

Budget Summary
| Psychological Warfare and Political Action | $270,000 |
| Subversion | 250,000 |
| Intelligence Operations | 150,000 |
| Maintenance of present cadre (8 months) | 160,000 |
| Expansion of cadre to 500 | 60,000 |
| Arms and Equipment | 400,000 |
| Operation of Nicaraguan training center | 100,000 |
| Support of internal organization (estimate) | 150,000 |
| Transportation, storage and travel (estimate) | 85,000 |
| Transport Aircraft and maintenance | 800,000 |
| Current liabilities | 10,000 |
| Contingencies | 565,000 |
| Total | $3,000,000 |

== 1955-1959 ==
As president, Armas restricted voting rights on the illiterate and banned all political parties and labor unions. Eventually, by executive order, he threw out the country's constitution and gave himself complete authority. Armas inherited a country that was financially in trouble, with the government's monetary reserves at $3.4 million in 1955, down from $42 million just 2 years prior. This meant that Guatemala would require financial help from the United States, which initially, was hard to obtain. It was said that "Armas surprised the State Department's Thomas Mann in September with a request for $260 million in aid, including plans for a $60 million national highway network." The Guatemalan government was corrupt and poorly managed, however, the Eisenhower administration believed that the fall of the Guatemalan government “would be a disastrous political setback for the United States.” The National Security Council would eventually approve an aid package of $53 million. The Guatemalans had to rely on American for money due to their inability to borrow money themselves.

The political and consequent social instability created in Guatemala six years later resulted in a very long civil war and its consequent, destructive impact upon the society, the economy, human rights and the culture of Guatemala. According to author Kate Doyle, the CIA-sponsored military coup in 1954 was "the poison arrow that pierced the heart of Guatemala's young democracy." The coup also left an undesirable feeling for the United States in many countries located in proximity to Guatemala, and in Guatemala itself; an internal history of PBSuccess mentions that people in multiple Latin American cities condemned President Eisenhower publicly. All over Latin America, large demonstrations broke out that were distinctly anti-American. Protesters gathered to burn American flags and images of Eisenhower and Dulles in cities such as Havana, Mexico City, and Buenos Aires, among others. The American role in the regime change would also contribute to many Guatemalan's support of communism. Daniel James, who was an editor at The New Leader, stated that “in death the Guatemalan party may prove to be a bigger asset to the Kremlin than in life.” The operation, which was carried out to prevent a communist government to take over Guatemala, ended up causing an increase in communist sympathizers. Among these sympathizers were young impressionable men, such as Che Guevara and Fidel Castro, who watched the Guatemalan incident and “learned…the importance of striking decisively against opponents before they could seek assistance from outside,” experience that would help them rise to power in Cuba.

The political fallout for PBSuccess stretched far beyond the borders of Guatemala, it became an international concern. Newspapers in England such as The London Times criticized America's intrusive covert operations as “modern forms of economic colonialism.” Protests erupted in the capital city of Myanmar (present day Burma), with dissenters throwing rocks at the American Embassy.

One of the more intriguing documents released in connection to Guatemala was "A Study of Assassination." Sections of the document include Definition (including a brief etymology of the word), Employment (when to opt for assassination), Justification ("Persons who are morally squeamish should not attempt it"), Classifications (definition of the code words "simple," "chase," "guarded," "lost," "safe," "secret," "open", and "terroristic"), The Assassin (describes the ideal assassin, including the following qualities: "determined, courageous, intelligent, resourceful, and physically active"), Planning (mental, not documented), Techniques (descriptions of the following techniques: manual, accidents, drugs, edge weapons, blunt weapons, firearms, and explosives), Examples (a list of 21 names of people who were either assassinated or victims of attempts, including Lincoln, Rasputin, and Hitler), and Conference Room Technique (hand drawn diagrams of 6 ways to commit an assassination in a conference room).

This study explicitly stated that instructions to assassinate an individual must never be in writing. The document disapproved of murder but allowed for assassination when the intended victim "is a clear and present danger to the cause of freedom." The report listed many different classifications of assassination depending on the level of risk and difficulty involved. When an assassin is planning on killing a target directly it is best to use improvised weapons, like a lamp stand or an ax that can be found on site to avoid the assassin being caught if searched beforehand. The report recommended planned accidents and drugs as effective means of assassination when employed properly. The report also detailed the effectiveness of various types of firearms. Some of the firearms that are present in the document include a precision rifle, which can be used if there is a long distance between the assailant and his target, the machine gun, which has a similar use as a rifle, the sub-machine gun, which is to be used at close range, a shotgun, which is highly effective under ten yards and only one target, various pistols, which are claimed to be as effective as they are ineffective, silenced weapons and explosives.

This CIA mission was about overthrowing a government that had ties to communism which one day could be a problem for the United States. This mission was very much tied to fruit and a company named United Fruit Company (UNFCO). United Fruit Company had been in Guatemala since 1904 which was its largest domain with the main product being of the banana. The United Fruit Company started in 1899 with a merger between the Boston Fruit Company and a business man named Minor Keith. With a capital of $215 million, what was happening in Guatemala was a concern for the company and the United States. President of Guatemala Jacobo Arbenz Guzman was against UNFCO and blamed them for the country's underdevelopment. President Arbenz planned to disrupt the power of UNFCO and the influence they had in Guatemala. The threat of communism spreading throughout Latin America gave the CIA the support to overthrow the Guatemala government without disrupting the United Fruit Company and their products.

There are numerous primary source documents that point to the ties between United Fruit and the United States government. A 1951 document mentions meetings between people representing the company and government officials. However, the United Fruit company did not benefit from Castillo Armas' reign, as American consumers consumed less fruit per capita in 1950. According to staff historian Nicholas Cullather, the company's profit margin dropped from 22.4 percent in 1950 to 15.4 percent in 1957. In addition, share prices fell to $43 in 1959 from $73 in 1951. Environmental ventures such as vulnerable trees and pesticide experimentation proved to be disastrous for the company as well, producing higher costs and declining yields. Furthermore, the antitrust action of President Dwight Eisenhower forced the company to divest its holding in railroads and marketing operations. The decline of the company continued and it ended up by selling its last parcel of land in Guatemala to Del Monte Corporation in 1972.

== 1960s ==
Mentions of PBSuccess began to surface during the early 1960s; people involved in the operations and planning of the mission, including Dwight D. Eisenhower and Allen Duells, spoke publicly about their roles to Congress and in the media. Prior to President Johnson's term in 1963, Dwight Eisenhower preached about how there was a time that America's end goal was to rid of communist governments. His wording in 1963 proved, in his opinion, that the nation was beginning to go a different direction. President Lyndon B. Johnson wanted to invade Guatemala with private military contractors. In support of this, CIA Director William Raborn was tasked with finding evidence to support the President's belief that Guatemala was a Cuban puppet state. Raborn was unsuccessful in finding such evidence. In late 1965 Ambassador Mein requested help from the United States with fighting terrorist and kidnapping in Guatemala. John P. Longan was selected for this job and to create a plan. Longan set up a meeting with Guatemala's Ambassador, chief of station, CAS, and chief public safety advisor to present his plan of action to high-ranking police and military officials, including the chiefs of the Judicial Police, the National Police (PN) and the Treasury Guard (GH). After multiple meetings these agencies were distrustful of each other and could not agree upon a plan of action. Longan advised Guatemalan officials to establish "frozen area plans" for police raids (cordon and search) and the development of a "joint operations plan" for inter-agency coordination.

A major feature of the new pacification strategy was the synchronization of the military and police forces in carrying out extralegal counter-terror activities. With money and support from US advisors, President Enrique Peralta Azurdia established a Presidential Intelligence Agency in the National Palace, under which a telecommunications database known as the Regional Telecommunications Center or La Regional existed, linking the National Police, the Treasury Guard, the Judicial Police, the Presidential House and the Military Communications Center via a VHF-FM intracity frequency. La Regional also served as a depository for the names of suspected "subversives" and had its own intelligence and operational unit attached to it. This network was built on the 'Committees against Communism' created by the Central Intelligence Agency after the coup in 1954.

The Guatemalan army general staff launched "Operation Limpieza" -Operation Cleanup-, an urban counterinsurgency program under the command of Colonel Rafael Arriaga Bosque. This program coordinated the activities of all of the country's main security agencies (including the Army, the Judicial Police and the National Police) in both covert and overt anti-guerrilla operations. Under Arriaga's direction, the security forces began to use extralegal tactics against the PGT. In 1966, the CIA station in Guatemala addressed the capture and execution of five people who reportedly had entered into Guatemala from Mexico, illegally. These men were tortured for two days and then executed by security officers. Among the victims was the leader of the Partido Guatemalteco de Trabajadores (PGT), Victor Manuel Gutiérrez. These actions occurred within the context of a series of coordinated joint raids by combined forces of the Judicial Police and the G-2 (the operational unit of military intelligence, S-2) in which 28 PGT members and associates were seized by Guatemalan security forces in early March 1966 and subsequently vanished. The incident became famous as the first case of mass "disappearance" in Guatemala's history and one of the first uses of forced disappearances as a counterinsurgency tactic in Latin America.

In July 1966, president Julio Caesar Mendez Montenegro signed a pact which gave the army and security services the green-light to apply "any means necessary" in fighting insurgents and internal opposition groups. The Army General Staff subsequently assumed all control over the security forces and appointed Vice-Defense Minister, Col. Manuel Francisco Sosa Avila as the main "counterinsurgency coordinator". In addition, the Army General Staff and the Ministry of Defense took control of the Presidential Intelligence Agency - and by extension La Regional and the entire affiliated intelligence network - and renamed it the Guatemalan National Security Service (Servicio de Seguridad Nacional de Guatemala - SSNG).

Within the framework of CIA supported counterinsurgency, a close relationship developed between right-wing paramilitary organizations and the security structures. Many civilian vigilantes linked to the MLN and right-wing paramilitary groups were simply absorbed by the Guatemalan Army G-2 in subsequent years. They operated as confidenciales or "military commissioners" and were attached to local army garrisons throughout the country. One Guatemalan high official acknowledged that over 3,000 MLN members collaborated with the Army. The most notorious of the right-wing paramilitary groups operating during the 1960s was the MANO, also known as the Mano Blanca ("White Hand"). Initially formed by the extreme-right MLN party as a paramilitary front in June 1966 to prevent President Méndez Montenegro from taking office, the MANO was quickly coopted by the army as an auxiliary force. The MANO - while being the only death squad formed autonomously from the government - had a largely military membership, and received substantial funding from wealthy landowners. The leader of the MLN and its paramilitary arm was Mario Sandoval Alarcon (later vice-president from 1974 to 1978). Sandoval Alarcon was a paid CIA asset for at least 30 years, starting in the 1950s. The MANO also received information from military intelligence through La Regional, with which it was linked to the Army General Staff and all of the main security forces.

In January 1967 a special counter-terror unit labeled the Special Commando Unit of the Guatemalan Army (SCUGA) under the command of Colonel Maximo Zepeda was created. The CIA Station in Guatemala planned to expand its operations to include an intelligence-gathering network through SCUGA. The purpose of SCUGA was to collect information through the arrests and interrogation of what they deemed to be revolutionaries of communism. It carried out 'special assignments' that included abduction and assassinations of local authorities that the CIA deemed disruptive and "real and alleged communists." The CIA itself referred to the SCUGA as a "government-sponsored terrorist organization...used primarily for assassinations and political abductions" In March 1967, after Vice-Defense Minister and counterinsurgency coordinator Col. Francisco Sosa Avila was named director-general of the National Police, a special counterinsurgency unit of the National Police known as the Fourth Corps was created to carry out extralegal operations alongside the SCUGA. The Fourth Corps was an illegal fifty-man assassination squad which operated in secrecy from other members of the National Police, taking orders from Col. Sosa and Col. Arriaga.

=== Links with the Phoenix Program ===
During the period of counterinsurgency and police militarization under Col. Sosa Avila, the PN worked closely with the USAID Office of Public Safety (OPS), which largely operated as a front for the CIA. Between 1966 and 1974, the OPS help militarize the PN and provided extensive training to Guatemalan security services in areas of counterinsurgency, intelligence gathering and interrogation. By 1970, more than 30,000 Guatemalan police officers had received some form of OPS training.

US government Biographic Register and Foreign Service Lists reveal that many of the same American OPS and other functionaries operating in Guatemala were also involved in Vietnam, particularly in Civil Operations and Revolutionary Development Support (CORDS). When asked about the origins of the death squads in Guatemala in a subsequent interview, General Oscar Humberto Mejia Victores (military president from 1983 to 1986) stated that they were initiated "in the 1960s with the CIA".

== 1970s ==
In 1970, after the fraudulent election of Col. Arana Osorio (representing the MLN-PID), the security forces engaged in harsher counterinsurgency measures in Guatemala City. From a special telecommunications annex of the presidential palace, the new military government coordinated a "covert program of selective assassination". The Arana presidency was one of the bloodiest regimes in modern Latin-American history, with Amnesty International estimating that at least 15,000 Guatemalans were killed or "disappeared" between 1970 and 1973. During his four-year term as military president, Arana continued to strengthen coordination among the security structures. As high-ranking intelligence officer Col. Otto Perez Molina (later president from 2012 to 2015) stated in a 1993 interview, the Arana-period marked the beginning of a period of "good intra-group relations and the most successful in combating urban insurgency".

In the 1974 election of Gen. Kjell Eugenio Laugerud Garcia, MLN party leader Mario Sandoval Alarcon - one of the CIA's most important assets in Guatemala - was appointed Vice-President of the Republic. The election of Gen. Laugerud Garcia marked the beginning of a period of strained relations between the Guatemalan government and the United States. This was primarily due to tensions between Guatemala and the UK over the sovereignty of Belize (formerly British Honduras) and US Congress's criticism of Guatemala's dismal human rights record. CIA support continued uninterrupted despite congressional constraints on military assistance to Guatemala. The full scale of these concealed programs remains largely unknown. Shortly after the Laugerud regime renounced aid in 1977, the CIA reportedly sent a large shipment of arms to Guatemala from Puerto Rico by way of a proprietary airline service the Flying Tiger - a sister organization of Air America. This shipment included machine guns, grenades, mortars and other lethal military supplies.

== 1980s ==
In 1981 the new administration of Ronald Reagan approved a $2 million covert CIA program for Guatemala. A classified NSA document published in The New York Times on 7 April 1983 confirmed that a decision was made in April 1982 - shortly after the coup against General Romeo Lucas Garcia - to allocate an additional $2.5 million for CIA operations within Guatemala. These programs were part of a larger program of CIA operations in Central America justified by the need of "arms interdiction". This was the same rationale given by the administration for providing $19.5 million to the Contra program in 1981.

This "arms interdiction program" used Argentine military personnel as opposed to American personnel directly. The New York Times journalist Leslie Gelb explained that "Argentina would be responsible, with funds from North American intelligence, of attacking the flux of equipment which was transiting Nicaragua to El Salvador and Guatemala". In actuality, the primary function of Argentine personnel in Guatemala and elsewhere in Central America was in a military advisory role. The involvement of Argentine intelligence forces in Guatemala and elsewhere occurred within the context of Operation Charly, a US-backed or US-led program in which Argentine personnel functioned as auxiliaries for the American personnel in Central America. The CIA and Argentine advisors cooperated closely in Guatemala, El Salvador, Honduras and in training the Nicaraguan FDN, especially during 1981-82. Argentina's involvement with the Guatemalan security services allegedly included direct involvement in running death squads. In 1999 the remains of two specific Guatemala citizens were found in a mass grave. The remains were discovered to be Guatemala's diary death squad victims, Amancio Samuel Villatoro and Sergio Saúl Linares Morales who went missing in 1984. Both men were abducted on separate incidents but were never seen by their families again. As a result of accords signed with the Argentine government in October 1981, over two hundred Guatemalan officers received training in Argentina in "interrogation techniques".

An investigative report published in the San Francisco Chronicle in August 1981, American newspaper columnist Jack Anderson, that the CIA was using Cuban exile groups to train security forces in Guatemala; in this operation, Anderson wrote, the CIA had arranged for "secret training in the finer points of assassination." Stan Goff, a Vietnam veteran and former Staff Sergeant in the US Army 2d Ranger Battalion who served in Guatemala with the 1st Special Forces Operational Detachment-Delta (SFOD-D) in 1983, claims that CIA paramilitary personnel (operating out of the US Embassy) participated directly in combat against the EGP alongside the Guatemalan army. This included planning and executing ambushes with the Guatemalan Army in the hotly contested northern provinces.

The CIA provided intelligence to the army for its long war against guerrillas, farmers, peasants and other opponents. The CIA station chief in Guatemala from 1988 to 1991 was a Cuban American. He had about 20 officers with a budget of about $5 million a year and an equal or greater sum for "liaison" with Guatemalan military. His job included placing and keeping senior Guatemalan officers on his payroll. Among them was Alpirez, who recruited others for CIA. Alpirez's intelligence unit spied on Guatemalans and is accused by human rights groups of assassinations.

In the latter stages of the thirty-six-year Guatemalan Civil War (1960–1996), however, the CIA helped reduce the incidence and number of the violations of the human rights of Guatemalans; and, in 1983, thwarted a palace coup d’ état, which allowed the eventual restoration of participatory democracy and civil government; the resultant national election was won by Democrácia Cristiana, the Christian Democracy party, and Marco Vinicio Cerezo Arévalo became President of the Republic of Guatemala (1986–91).

The reasons for the human rights related activities were due to the increase of abductions and deaths of Guatemalan citizens that were tied to politics. There were reports from the UN Human Rights Commission Special Rapporteur (Lord Colville) that stated that Guatemala did violate basic rights but was improving. It was recorded that about 500 Guatemalan citizens were killed in the year 1983, many which were deaths tied to the government. In the same year about 300 people vanished, which were linked to politics, government, and guerrillas. The killings were a result of the tit for tat battle between the government and guerrilla forces. According to a CIA analysis document reporting on the increase rate of assassinations and disappearances these deaths and kidnappings were intended to suppress political opposition within Guatemala on each side. The documents states, "Guatemalan guerrillas have regularly murdered the administrators of large farms (fincas), as well as military commissioners in rural villages. Government security services have employed assassination to eliminate persons suspected of involvement with the guerrillas or who are otherwise left-wing in orientation. Certain army commanders traditionally have fought the insurgents by kidnapping and murdering indigenous people and country folk suspected of collaborating with them". The civil war ended in 1996. 160,000 people were killed, and 40,000 forced disappearances occurred during the war. Amongst the missing were men, women, and children who were subjected to interrogation, torture, and execution. The Guatemala government and death squads were responsible for 93% of civilian executions during the war.

== 1990s ==
In 1993 the CIA helped in overthrowing President Jorge Serrano Elías who attempted a self-coup and had illegally suspended the constitution, dissolved Congress and the Supreme Court, and imposed censorship. Serrano then fled Guatemala and was replaced by Ramiro de León Carpio. The United States then worked closely with the new Guatemalan president in an attempt to strengthen democracy and human rights.

In June 1996, the President's Intelligence Oversight Board released ‘Report on the Guatemala Review’ which asserted that the CIA had sponsored multiple intelligence agencies that were infamous for inhumanities in Guatemala. The report states that a significant amount of the agency's Guatemalan allies, including the D-2 and the Presidential Department of Security, were believed to have been involved with numerous "reprehensible" human rights violations in the region. The report alleged that the CIA ignored the majority of these allegations between the mid-1980s and the early 1990s until the end of 1994 and early 1995. This report also caused the CIA to stop funding a considerable amount of its assets. After this information was unveiled, John Duetch, then-Director of the CIA, forced Terry Ward, the CIA's Chief of the Latin American Division, to retire for failing to inform Congress about these alleged offenses, though still expressing that the forced retirement would involve "no loss of appropriate recognition for [Ward's] previous service."

== See also ==
- CIA activities by country
- CIA activities in Nicaragua
