= 1954 Guatemalan general election =

1954 General elections in Guatemala

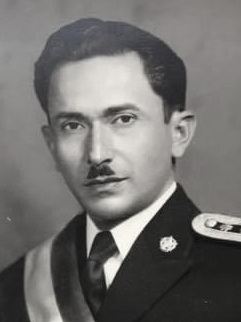
Carlos Castillo Armas

Constituent Assembly elections were held alongside a plebiscite on the presidency of Carlos Castillo Armas in Guatemala on 10 October 1954. A reported 99.92% of voters voted in favour of Armas' presidency, whilst the National Anti-Communist Front won 57 of the 65 seats in the Assembly.

== Results ==
=== Armas as president ===
Choice	Votes	%
For	485,699	99.92
Against	400	0.08
Invalid/blank votes		–
Total	486,099	100
Source: Holden

=== Constituent Assembly ===
Party	Seats
National Anti-Communist Front	57
Anti-Communist University Students Committee	2
ACCA	2
Independent Anti-Communist Party of the West	2
Independents	2
Total	65
Source: Ebel

== Bibliography ==
- Villagrán Kramer, Francisco. Biografía política de Guatemala: años de guerra y años de paz. FLACSO-Guatemala, 2004.
- Political handbook of the world 1954. New York, 1955.
- Elections in the Americas A Data Handbook Volume 1. North America, Central America, and the Caribbean. Edited by Dieter Nohlen. 2005.
- Holden, Robert H. 2004. Armies without nations: public violence and state formation in Central America, 1821-1960. New York: Oxford University Press.
- Ebel, Roland H. 1998. Misunderstood caudillo: Miguel Ydigoras Fuentes and the failure of democracy in Guatemala. Lanham: University Press of America.
