= National Anti-Communist Front =

Parties coalition

The National Anti-Communist Front (Spanish: Frente Anti-Communista Nacional) was a coalition of the anti-communist parties and groups (of ten or more) that supported Carlos Castillo Armas. Its program envisioned economic and social reforms for the development of Guatemala and the elimination of communist infiltration. Its members included the Anti-Communist Unification Party (PUA), Independent Anti-Communist Party of the West (PIACO), Anti-Communist University Students Committee (CEUA), Comités como el Cívico Independiente, Obrero Anticomunista, Femenino Anticomunista, de Locatarias, Asociación Juvenil Anticomunista, among others. In 1955, most member organizations were involved in the establishment of the National Democratic Movement (MDN).
