= Operation PBFortune =

1952 United States covert operation in Guatemala

Operation PBFortune, also known as Operation Fortune, was a covert United States operation to overthrow the democratically elected Guatemalan President Jacobo Árbenz in 1952. The operation was authorized by U.S. President Harry Truman and planned by the Central Intelligence Agency. The United Fruit Company had lobbied intensively for the overthrow because land reform initiated by Árbenz threatened its economic interests. The US also feared that the government of Árbenz was being influenced by communists.

The coup attempt was planned with the support of the United Fruit Company and of Anastasio Somoza García, Rafael Trujillo and Marcos Pérez Jiménez, the US-backed right-wing dictators of Nicaragua, the Dominican Republic, and Venezuela respectively, who felt threatened by the democratic Guatemalan Revolution, and had sought to undermine it. The plan involved providing weapons to the exiled Guatemalan military officer Carlos Castillo Armas, who was to lead an invasion from Nicaragua.

The US State Department discovered that details of the plan had become widely known. US Secretary of State Dean Acheson became concerned that the coup attempt would damage the image of the US, which had committed to a policy of non-intervention, and so terminated the operation. Operation PBFortune was followed two years later by Operation PBSuccess, another covert operation in which Castillo Armas played a prominent role. PBSuccess toppled the Árbenz government and ended the Guatemalan Revolution.

== Background ==
From the late 19th century until 1944, a series of authoritarian rulers governed Guatemala. Between 1898 and 1920, Manuel Estrada Cabrera granted significant concessions to the United Fruit Company and dispossessed many indigenous peoples of their communal land. Under Jorge Ubico, who ruled as a dictator between 1931 and 1944, this process was intensified with the institution of brutal labor regulations and the establishment of a police state.

In June 1944, a popular pro-democracy movement led by university students and labor organizations forced Ubico to resign. Ubico handed over power to a military junta that was toppled in a military coup led by Jacobo Árbenz in October 1944, an event known as the October Revolution. The coup leaders called for open elections, which were won by Juan José Arévalo, a progressive professor of philosophy who had become the face of the popular movement. He implemented a moderate program of social reform, including a successful literacy campaign and largely free elections, although illiterate women were not given the vote, and communist parties were banned.

Following the end of Arévalo's highly popular presidency in 1951, Árbenz was elected president. He continued the reforms of Arévalo and also began an ambitious land reform program known as Decree 900. Under it, the uncultivated portions of large land-holdings were expropriated in return for compensation and redistributed to poverty-stricken agricultural laborers.

Some governments in Central America and the Caribbean were hostile to Árbenz and the Guatemalan Revolution. Anastasio Somoza García, Rafael Leonidas Trujillo and Marcos Pérez Jiménez, the US-backed right-wing dictators of Nicaragua, the Dominican Republic and Venezuela, respectively, felt threatened by Arévalo's reforms. Under Arévalo, Guatemala had become a haven for pro-democracy activists from those three countries. Somoza, Trujillo, and Jiménez had supported Guatemalan exiles working to undermine the Guatemalan government, in addition to suppressing democratic popular movements in their own countries.

The political climate of the Cold War led the US government to see the policies of Arévalo and Árbenz as communist. This conception had been strengthened by Arévalo's support for the Caribbean Legion, and by the 1950s the US government was considering overthrowing Árbenz. The attitude of the United States was also influenced by the Monroe Doctrine, a philosophy of foreign policy articulated by James Monroe in 1823, which justified the maintenance of US hegemony in the region. The stated aim of the doctrine was to maintain order and stability and to make certain that access to resources and markets was not limited. Historian Mark Gilderhus opines that the doctrine also contained racially condescending language, which likened Latin American countries to fighting children. Before 1944, the US government had not needed to engage in military interventions in Guatemala to enforce this hegemony, given the presence of military rulers friendly to the US.

== Planning ==
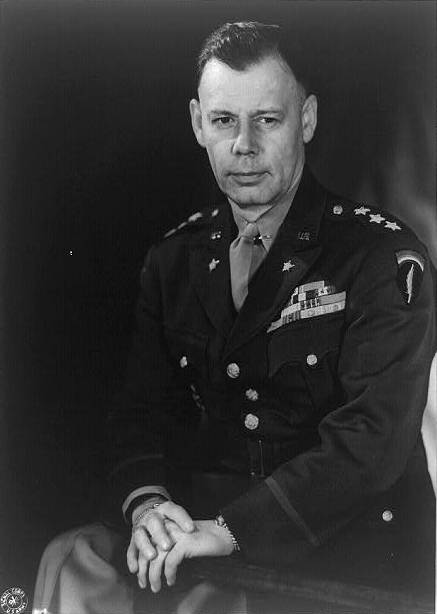
Walter Bedell Smith, the Director of Central Intelligence during the operation

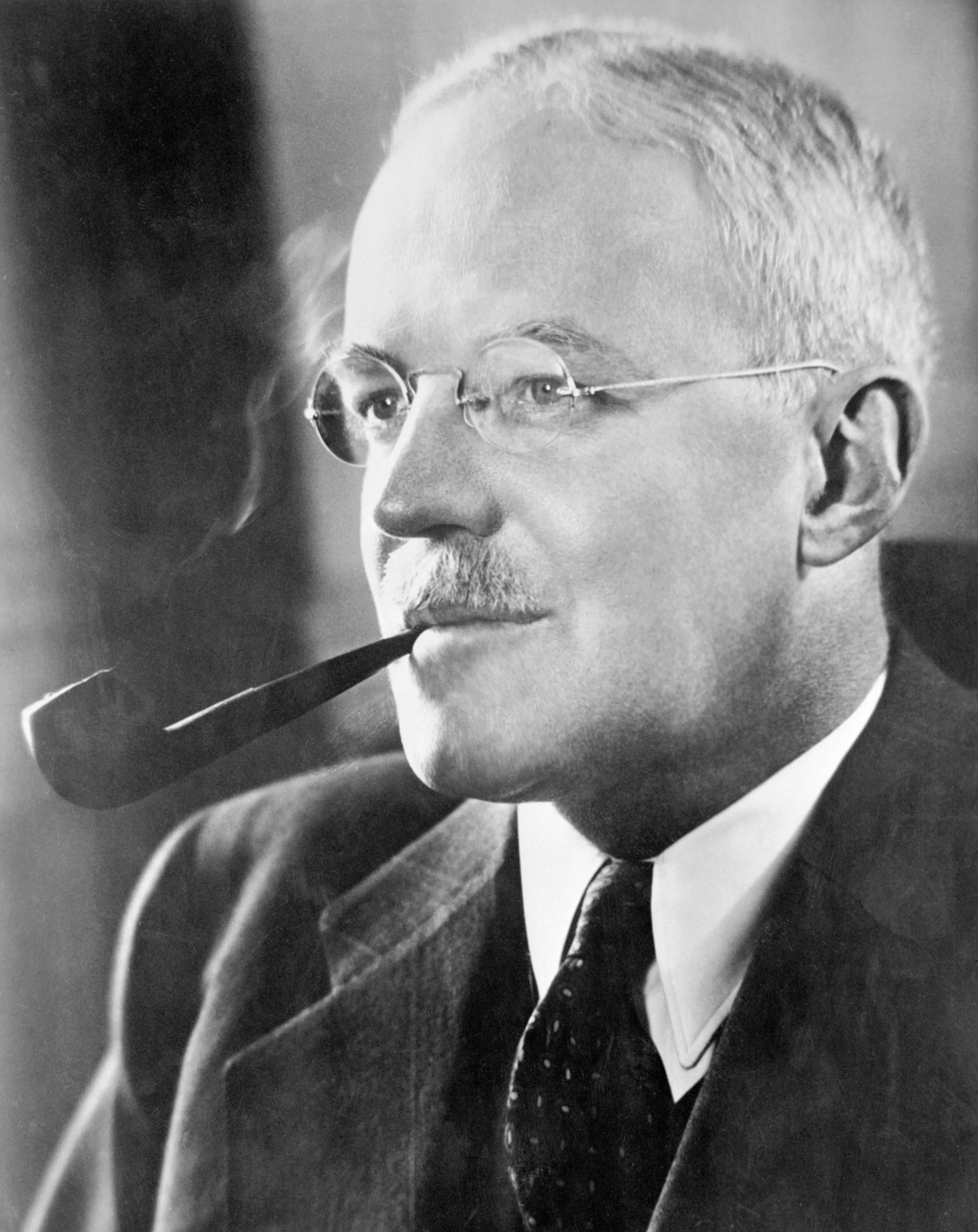
Allen Dulles, the Deputy Director of Central Intelligence during the operation

=== Somoza's visit ===
In May 1952, Árbenz enacted Decree 900, the official title of the Guatemalan agrarian reform law. Approximately 500,000 people benefited from the decree. The United Fruit Company lost several hundred thousand acres of its uncultivated land to this law, and the compensation it received was based on the undervalued price it had presented to the Guatemalan government for tax purposes. The company therefore intensified its lobbying in Washington D.C. against the Guatemalan government. The law convinced the US government that the Guatemalan government was being influenced by communists.

The US government's Central Intelligence Agency (CIA) started to explore the notion of lending support to detractors and opponents of Árbenz. Walter Bedell Smith, the Director of Central Intelligence, ordered J. C. King, the chief of the Western Hemisphere Division, to examine whether dissident Guatemalans could topple the Árbenz government if they had support from the dictatorships in Central America.

At this point the US government was approached by Nicaraguan leader Somoza, who had been in the United States on a private visit, during which he made public speeches praising the US, and was awarded a medal by New York City. During a meeting with Truman and his senior staff, Somoza said that if he were given the weapons, he would "clean up Guatemala". Truman's personal military advisor, Major General Harry H. Vaughan, persuaded Truman to explore the opportunity further, and Truman asked Smith to follow up.

=== Carlos Castillo Armas ===
Although the proposal was not taken seriously at the time, US Colonel Cornelius Mara flew back to Nicaragua with Somoza to further explore the idea. Somoza persuaded Mara that the plan was feasible, and Mara returned to the US and gave Truman a favorable report. Smith also sent a Spanish-speaking engineer (Note: Secret History, by Nick Cullather, is based on declassified documents from the US Central Intelligence Agency. Several of these documents are redacted, leaving out certain details. These redactions have been reproduced in Cullather's text. The name of the engineer dispatched to Guatemala has been redacted.) under the codename "Seekford" to contact exiled Guatemalan Army officer Carlos Castillo Armas and his fellow dissidents, who were in Honduras and Guatemala.

Francisco Javier Arana had launched an ill-fated coup attempt against Arévalo in 1949. Castillo Armas had been a protégé of Arana, and had risen in the military to become the head of the military academy of Guatemala by 1949. Historians differ on what happened to Castillo Armas following the coup attempt. Piero Gleijeses writes that Castillo Armas was expelled from the country; Nick Cullather and Andrew Fraser, however, say Castillo Armas was arrested in August 1949, that Árbenz had him imprisoned under doubtful charges until December 1949, and that he was found in Honduras a month later.

In early 1950, a CIA officer found Castillo Armas attempting to get weapons from Somoza and Trujillo. He met with the CIA a few more times before November 1950, when he launched an attack against Matamoros, the largest fortress in the capital, and was jailed for it before bribing his way out of prison. Castillo Armas told the CIA he had the support of the Guardia Civil (Civil Guard), the garrison at Quetzaltenango, Guatemala's second-largest city, and of the commander of Matamoros. The engineer dispatched by the CIA also told them Castillo Armas had the financial backing of Somoza and Trujillo.

Based on these reports, Truman authorized Operation PBFortune. According to Gleijeses, he did not inform the US State Department, or secretary of state Dean Acheson, of the plan. Based upon an examination of declassified documents, however, Cullather has said the CIA did, in fact, seek State Department approval before authorizing the plan, and that undersecretary of state David K. E. Bruce provided explicit approval for it. CIA Deputy Director Allen Dulles had previously contacted State Department official Thomas Mann and the Assistant Secretary of State for Inter-American Affairs Edward G. Miller Jr. Both these individuals had said they wanted a new government in Guatemala even if it involved the use of force, but when asked, did not explicitly approve of action to topple Árbenz. Dulles assumed their vague responses implied support, but obtained explicit assent from Bruce before proceeding.

=== The plot ===
The details of the plot were finalized over the next few weeks by the CIA, the United Fruit Company, and Somoza. The coup's plotters contacted Trujillo and Jiménez, who, along with Somoza and Juan Manuel Gálvez, the right-wing President of Honduras, had already been exchanging intelligence about the Árbenz government, and had considered the possibility of supporting an invasion by Guatemalan exiles. The two dictators were supportive of the plan, and agreed to contribute some funding.

Although PBFortune was officially approved on September 9, 1952, planning had begun earlier in the year. In January 1952, officers in the CIA's Directorate of Plans compiled a list of "top flight Communists whom the new government would desire to eliminate immediately in the event of a successful anti-Communist coup". The assassination plans represented the first time the US had considered assassination in Guatemala. The list of targets had been drawn up by the CIA even before the operation had been formally authorized. They were created using a list of communists that the Guatemalan Army had compiled in 1949, as well as its own intelligence. Nine months later the CIA also received through "Seekford" a list of 58 Guatemalans whom Castillo Armas wanted killed, in addition to 74 others he wanted arrested or exiled. "Seekford" also said Trujillo's support was conditional on the assassination of four individuals from Santo Domingo who were at that point living in Guatemala. The plan was to be carried out by Castillo Armas, and involve no direct intervention from the US.

When contacted by the CIA agent dispatched by Smith, Castillo Armas had proposed a battle-plan to gain CIA support. This plan involved three forces invading Guatemala from Mexico, Honduras, and El Salvador. These invasions were supposed to be supported by internal rebellions. (Note: The name of the individual who was supposed to lead the internal uprisings has been redacted in the CIA documents.) King formulated a plan to provide Castillo Armas with $225,000 as well as weaponry and transportation. His plan also suggested that Somoza and Gálvez be persuaded to provide air support, in addition to other help. The proposal went to Dulles. It emphasized the relatively small role the CIA was supposed to play, and stated that without the CIA's support, the plot would probably go ahead, but would likely fail and lead to a crackdown on anti-Communist forces.

== Execution and termination ==
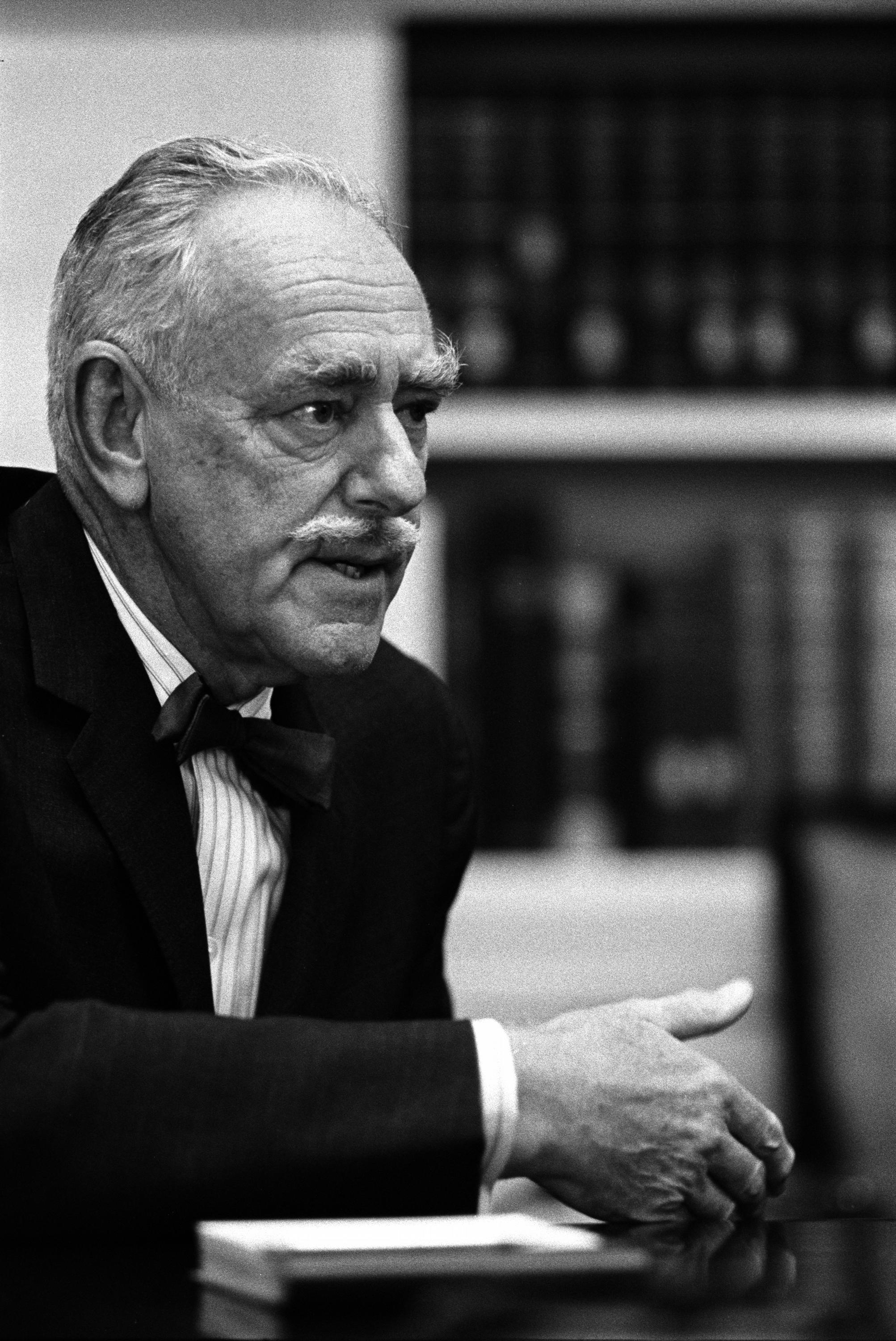
US Secretary of State Dean Acheson, whose intervention ended the operation

The plan was put into motion in autumn 1952 by the CIA. King had obtained weapons from the stock of those that had been confiscated by port authorities in the city of New York. These included 250 rifles, 380 pistols, 64 machine guns, and 4,500 grenades. (Note: Details of other types of weapons have been redacted in the CIA documents.) The United Fruit Company lent one of its freighters to the CIA. The freighter was specially refitted in New Orleans, and loaded with weapons under the guise of agricultural machinery. It was scheduled to sail to Nicaragua in early October 1952.

The CIA had encouraged Somoza and Gálvez to provide support to Castillo Armas' forces. Somoza, however, informed several government officials across Central America of the CIA's role in the coup attempt. Somoza's son Tacho, for instance, casually asked Miller whether "the machinery" was on its way at a meeting in Panama.

Accounts of the operation's termination vary between historians. Gleijeses said that while the freighter was on its way to Nicaragua, a CIA employee went to Miller, and asked him to sign a document on behalf of the munitions department. Miller refused, and instead showed the document to his superiors, who in turn informed Acheson. Gleijeses writes that Acheson immediately spoke to Truman as a result of this document, and the operation was cut short. Nick Cullather writes that, due to Somoza spreading the word about the coup, the State Department decided the cover of the operation had been lost. Other diplomats began to learn of the operation, and on October 8, Acheson summoned Smith and called it off.

Acheson was particularly worried that allowing the details of the coup to go public would damage the image of the US. Under the Rio Pact of 1947, the Organization of American States (OAS) had obtained jurisdiction over regional disputes from the United Nations. To achieve this, the US had also committed to a policy of non-intervention in the internal affairs of other countries. If PBFortune had become public knowledge, the fact that the US was supporting an invasion of a fellow member of the OAS would have represented a huge setback to US policy, thus motivating the State Department to end the operation when they became aware its cover had been blown.

== Aftermath ==
The termination of the operation caught the CIA by surprise, and King quickly attempted to salvage what he could. The freighter was redirected to Panama, where the arms were unloaded; King kept the weapons there in the hope that the project could be rejuvenated. Castillo Armas was paid a retainer of $3,000 a week, which allowed him to maintain a small force. The CIA remained in contact with him, and continued to provide support to the rebels. The CIA found it difficult to end the operation without drawing attention to it.

Peréz Jimenez opened a line of credit that would allow Castillo Armas to purchase airplanes, and Trujillo and Somoza continued to support the operation, although they acknowledged it would have to be postponed. The money paid to Castillo Armas has been described as a way of making sure he did not attempt any premature action. Even after the operation had been terminated, the CIA received reports from "Seekford" that the Guatemalan rebels were planning assassinations. Castillo Armas made plans to use groups of soldiers in civilian clothing from Nicaragua, Honduras, and El Salvador to kill communist leaders in Guatemala. King continued to explore the CIA's ability to move arms around Central America without the approval of the State Department.

In November 1952, Dwight Eisenhower was elected president of the US after a campaign promising a more hawkish stance against communism. Many senior figures in his cabinet, including John Foster Dulles and his brother Allen, had close connections to the United Fruit Company, which made Eisenhower more strongly predisposed than Truman to support Árbenz's overthrow. In June 1954, the US trained and funded an invasion force led by Castillo Armas, backed by an intense campaign of psychological warfare by the CIA. Gálvez, Somoza, Jiménez, and Trujillo again offered the CIA their support in preparing for this operation. Árbenz resigned on June 27, 1954, ending the Guatemalan Revolution. Following his resignation, the CIA launched Operation PBHistory, an attempt to use documents from Árbenz's government and elsewhere to justify the coup in response to the negative international reactions to it.

From 1954 onward Guatemala was ruled by a series of US-backed military dictators, leading to the Guatemalan Civil War which lasted until 1996. Approximately 200,000 civilians were killed in the war, and numerous human rights violations committed, including massacres of civilian populations, rape, aerial bombardment, and forced disappearances. Of these violations, 93 percent were committed by the United States-backed military, which included a genocidal scorched-earth campaign against the indigenous Maya population in the 1980s.

== Sources ==
- Callanan, James (2009). Covert Action in the Cold War: US Policy, Intelligence and CIA Operations. I. B. Tauris. ISBN 978-0-85771-166-3.
- Cullather, Nicholas (1999). Secret History: The CIA's Classified Account of its Operations in Guatemala, 1952–1954. Stanford University Press. ISBN 978-0-8047-3311-3.
- De La Pedraja, René (2013). Wars of Latin America, 1948–1982: The Rise of the Guerrillas. McFarland. ISBN 978-0-7864-7015-0.
- Forster, Cindy (2001). The Time of Freedom: Campesino Workers in Guatemala's October Revolution. University of Pittsburgh Press. ISBN 978-0-8229-4162-0.
- Fraser, Andrew (August 2006). "Architecture of a Broken Dream: The CIA and Guatemala, 1952–54". Intelligence and National Security. 20 (3): 486–508. doi:10.1080/02684520500269010. S2CID 154550395.
- Gilderhus, Mark T. (March 2006). "The Monroe Doctrine: Meanings and Implications". Presidential Studies Quarterly. 36 (1): 5–16. doi:10.1111/j.1741-5705.2006.00282.x. JSTOR 27552742.
- Gleijeses, Piero (1991). Shattered Hope: The Guatemalan Revolution and the United States, 1944–1954. Princeton University Press. ISBN 978-0-691-02556-8.
- Grandin, Greg (2000). The Blood of Guatemala: A History of Race and Nation. Duke University Press. ISBN 978-0-8223-2495-9.
- Haines, Gerald (June 1995). "CIA and Guatemala Assassination Proposals, 1952–1954" (PDF). CIA Historical Review Program.
- Hanhimäki, Jussi; Westad, Odd Arne (2004). The Cold War: A History in Documents and Eyewitness Accounts. Oxford University Press. ISBN 978-0-19-927280-8.
- Holland, Max (2004). "Operation PBHistory: The Aftermath of SUCCESS". International Journal of Intelligence and CounterIntelligence. 17 (2): 300–332. doi:10.1080/08850600490274935. S2CID 153570470.
- Immerman, Richard H. (1982). The CIA in Guatemala: The Foreign Policy of Intervention. University of Texas Press. ISBN 978-0-292-71083-2.
- McAllister, Carlota (2010). "A Headlong Rush into the Future". In Grandin, Greg; Joseph, Gilbert (eds.). A Century of Revolution. Duke University Press. pp. 276–309. ISBN 978-0-8223-9285-9.
- Moulton, Aaron Coy (July 2013). ""Amplies Ayuda Externa" Contra "La Gangrena Comunista": Las Fuerzas Regionales Anticomunistas y la Finalizacion de la Operacion PBFortune, Octobre de 1952" ["Extend External Assistance" Against "The Communist Gangrene": The Regional Anti-Communist Forces and the Finalization of Operation PBFortune, October 1952]. Revista de Historia de América (in Spanish) (149): 45–58. JSTOR 44732841.
- Schlesinger, Stephen; Kinzer, Stephen (1999). Bitter Fruit: The Story of the American Coup in Guatemala. David Rockefeller Center series on Latin American studies, Harvard University. ISBN 978-0-674-01930-0.
- Streeter, Stephen M. (2000). Managing the Counterrevolution: The United States and Guatemala, 1954–1961. Ohio University Press. ISBN 978-0-89680-215-5.
