= Preventive Penal Law Against Communism =

1954 Guatemalan decree

The Preventive Penal Law Against Communism (Spanish: Ley Preventiva Penal Contra el Comunismo) was a Guatemalan decree passed by the military junta of Carlos Castillo Armas on 24 August 1954. The decree was preceded by the formation of the National Committee of Defense Against Communism. The Preventive Penal Law Against Communism officially prohibited any kind of communist activity and established a blacklist of active communists.

Around 70,000 Guatemalans engaging or suspected of engaging in communist activities were blacklisted under the law. Another 8,000 were arrested, and an estimated 8,000-10,000 were forced into exile. This decree was also used to suspend habeas corpus.

== See also ==
- 1954 Guatemalan coup d'état
