= National Committee of Defense Against Communism =

State-security committee in Guatemala

The National Committee of Defense Against Communism (Spanish: Comité Nacional de Defensa contra El Comunismo) was a committee formed on 19 July 1954 in Guatemala by president Carlos Castillo at the request of the United States Central Intelligence Agency. The Committee's primary goal was to fight alleged threats to the government of Guatemala by persons the Committee named as Communist subversives.

== Background ==
Carlos Castillo was an anti-liberal, anti-communist Guatemalan army officer who helped overthrow the dictatorship of Jorge Ubico in 1944. As the October Revolution of 1944 continued, he became angry with the administration of Juan José Arévalo after the assassination of Colonel Javier Arana, someone that Castillo respected highly. In November 1950, Castillo attempted to overthrow the Arévalo administration with seventy of his followers. The coup failed, several of his soldiers were killed, and Castillo himself was shot and captured. However, he managed to escape in 1952 and fled to Honduras.

In August 1953, Castillo became the "Liberator" of Guatemala, supported by the Eisenhower administration and specifically the CIA, with the aim of overthrowing the allegedly pro-communist administration of Jacobo Arbenz, Arévalo's successor. With that backing, Castillo successfully completed a coup (PBSuccess) against the Arbenz administration and on 1 September 1954 he was officially declared president of Guatemala.

== The National Committee ==
On July 19, 1954, Castillo formed the National Committee of Defense Against Communism upon the recommendation of the CIA. This was coupled with the Preventive Penal Law Against Communism. Its primary goal was to root out threats to the Castillo administration by Communist ideologues and supporters. The Committee was given the power to convene in secret, as well as the power to arrest and detain, for up to six months, any persons declared by the Committee to be communist. Those declared communist by the Committee had no right to any kind of defense or appeal if they were charged of a crime under the Preventive Penal Law; they could not own shortwave radios or hold any kind of public office, local or national.

By 21 November 1954, the Castillo administration and the National Committee had compiled a list of 72,000 persons deemed to be communists.

== See also ==
- History of Guatemala
