= 1955 Guatemalan parliamentary election =

Parliamentary elections were held in Guatemala on 18 December 1955. The result was a victory for the National Democratic Movement, which won 58 of the 66 seats in Congress.

== Results ==
Party	Seats
National Democratic Movement	58
Guatemalan Christian Democracy	5
Anti-Communist Unification Party	3
Total	66

== Bibliography ==
- Villagrán Kramer, Francisco. Biografía política de Guatemala: años de guerra y años de paz. FLACSO-Guatemala, 2004.
- Political handbook of the world 1955. New York, 1956.
- Elections in the Americas A Data Handbook Volume 1. North America, Central America, and the Caribbean. Edited by Dieter Nohlen. 2005.
- Guatemala : monografía de partidos políticos 2000-2004. 2004. Guatemala: Asociación de Investigación y Estudios Sociales, Departamento de Investigaciones Sociopolíticas. Second edition.
- Ebel, Roland H. 1998. Misunderstood caudillo: Miguel Ydigoras Fuentes and the failure of democracy in Guatemala. Lanham: University Press of America.
