= Anti-Communist University Students Committee =

The Anti-Communist University Students Committee (Comite de Estudiantes Universitarios Anticomunistas), (CEUA) was a rightist, anti-communist organization in Guatemala, which was founded in late 1953, during the last year of the Guatemalan Revolution. Its founders and leaders were Mario Sandoval Alarcon, Lionel Sisniega Otero, Mario Lopez Villatoro, and Eduardo Taracena de la Cerda. Lionel Sisniega Otero was a broadcaster for the clandestine radio station that the liberation movement operated before Jacobo Arbenz Guzmán's resignation, together with Mario Lopez Villatoro and Jose Toron Barrios, who were both killed by the guerrillas in the 1960s. They fought against the government of Arbenz. Headed by a young activist, the group counted 50 members in the capital and a nationwide network of sympathetic students ready to risk arrest. After the coup in 1954 CEUA supported the government of Carlos Castillo Armas.

Declassified material from the Information Research Department (IRD) of the United Kingdom's Foreign Office show CEUA was involved in spreading in Guatemala anti communist propaganda prepared by the Foreign Office's IRD, its intelligence branch, against the democratically elected government of Jacobo Árbenz.

== Bibliography ==
- "Secret History: The CIA's Classified Account of Its Operations in Guatemala, 1952-1954." (Review) The Journal of Interdisciplinary History September 22, 2000.
- Schneider Ronald M. Communism in Guatemala, 1944-1954 New York: Octagon Books 1979
- Political parties of the Americas : Canada, Latin America, and the West Indies Robert J. Alexander ed. Westport, Conn. : Greenwood Press, 1982.
- Berger Susan A. Political and agrarian development in Guatemala by Boulder: Westview Press 1992
- A case history of communist penetration: Guatemala. by United States. Dept. of State. Office of Public Services. Published in 1957, (Washington).
- Gleijeses, Piero, Shattered Hope: The Guatemalan Revolution and the United States, 1944-1954, Princeton, 1991.
- Encyclopedia of Latin American History and Culture: 2nd ed. 2008.
