= Independent Anti-Communist Party of the West =

The Independent Anti-Communist Party of the West (Spanish: Partido Independiente Anticomunista Occidental; PIACO) was a Guatemalan right-wing party founded in 1953. Led by Inez Nuño, it was the leading anti-Communist party in the Western part of Guatemala. PIACO fought against the government of Jacobo Arbenz Guzmán. After the coup in 1954, it supported the government of Carlos Castillo Armas, and subsequently collaborated with Ydígoras Fuentes.
