= Piero Gleijeses =

Italian historian (born 1944)

Piero Gleijeses (Venice, Italy, August 4, 1944) is a professor of United States foreign policy at the Paul H. Nitze School of Advanced International Studies (SAIS) at Johns Hopkins University. He is best known for his scholarly studies of Cuban foreign policy under Fidel Castro, which earned him a Guggenheim Fellowship in 2005, and has also published several works on US intervention in Latin America. He is the only foreign scholar to have been allowed access to the Cuba's Castro-era government archives.

== Education and work ==
Gleijeses gained a PhD in international relations from the Graduate Institute of International Studies in Geneva, and knows Afrikaans, French, German, Italian, Portuguese, Russian, and Spanish.

His 2002 book, Conflicting Missions: Havana, Washington and Africa, 1959–1976, was an exhaustive re-examination of the Cuban involvement in the decolonization of Africa. Hailed by Jorge Dominguez as "the best study available of Cuban operations in Africa during the Cold War", it won SHAFR's Robert H. Ferrell Book Prize for 2003. Visions of Freedom (2013) picks up from Conflicting Missions by looking at the clash between Cuba, the United States, the Soviet Union, and South Africa in southern Africa between 1976 and 1991.

Aside from scholarly journals, Gleijeses has contributed to such publications as Foreign Affairs and the London Review of Books.

== Selected publications ==
=== Books ===
- Visions of Freedom: Havana, Washington, Pretoria, and the Struggle for Southern Africa, 1976–1991. Chapel Hill, NC: University of North Carolina Press. 2013. ISBN 978-1-469-60968-3.
- The Cuban Drumbeat: Castro's Worldview. Seagull Books. 2009. ISBN 978-1-906-49737-8.
- Conflicting Missions: Havana, Washington and Africa, 1959–1976. Chapel Hill, NC: University of North Carolina Press. 2002. ISBN 978-0-807-82647-8.
- Shattered Hope: The Guatemalan Revolution and the United States, 1944–1954. Princeton, NJ: Princeton University Press. 1992. ISBN 978-0-691-07817-5.
- Politics and Culture in Guatemala. Ann Arbor, MI: UM Center for Political Studies. 1988.
- Tilting at Windmills: Reagan in Central America. Washington, DC: SAIS Foreign Policy Institute. 1982. ISBN 978-0-941-70002-3.
- The Dominican Crisis: The 1965 Constitutionalist Revolt and American Intervention. Baltimore, MD: Johns Hopkins University Press. 1978. ISBN 978-0-801-82025-0.

=== Articles and chapters ===
- "Cuba and the Cold War, 1959–1980". In Melvyn P. Leffler and Odd Arne Westad, eds., The Cambridge History of the Cold War, Volume II: Crises and Détente (pp. 327–348). Cambridge: Cambridge University Press. 2010. ISBN 978-0-521-83720-0.
- "Afterword: The Culture of Fear". In Nick Cullather, Secret History: The CIA's Classified Account of Its Operations in Guatemala 1952–1954 (pp. xxiii–xxxviii). 2nd ed. Stanford, CA: Stanford University Press. 2006. ISBN 978-0-804-75467-5.
- Gleijeses, Piero (2006). "Moscow's Proxy? Cuba and Africa, 1975–1988" (PDF). Journal of Cold War Studies. 8 (2): 3–51. doi:10.1162/jcws.2006.8.2.3. S2CID 57568629. Archived from the original (PDF) on 2019-05-16.
- Gleijeses, Piero (1997). "The First Ambassadors: Cuba's Contribution to Guinea-Bissau's War of Independence". Journal of Latin American Studies. 29 (1): 45–88. doi:10.1017/s0022216x96004646. JSTOR 158071. S2CID 144904249.
- Gleijeses, Piero (1996). "Cuba's First Venture in Africa: Algeria, 1961–1965". Journal of Latin American Studies. 28 (1): 159–195. doi:10.1017/s0022216x00012670. JSTOR 157991. S2CID 144610436.
- Gleijeses, Piero (1994). "'Flee! The White Giants are Coming!': The United States, the Mercenaries, and the Congo, 1964–1965" (PDF). Diplomatic History. 18 (2): 207–237. doi:10.1111/j.1467-7709.1994.tb00611.x. Archived from the original (PDF) on 2013-01-17.
- Gleijeses, Piero (1983). "The Case for Power Sharing in El Salvador". Foreign Affairs. 61 (5): 1048–1063. doi:10.2307/20041635. JSTOR 20041635.

== Awards and distinctions ==
- 2005 – Guggenheim Fellowship
- 2003 – Cuban Medal of Friendship
- 2003 – Robert H. Ferrell Book Prize

== Personal life ==
Gleijeses is married to artist Setsuko Ono, the sister of Yoko Ono.
