= Decree 900 =

1952 Guatemalan land-reform law

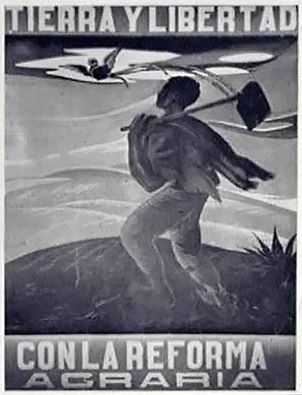
A poster claiming "Land and freedom, with the Land Reform".

Decree 900 (Spanish: Decreto 900), also known as the Agrarian Reform Law, was a Guatemalan land-reform law passed on June 17, 1952, during the Guatemalan Revolution. The law was introduced by President Jacobo Árbenz Guzmán and passed by the Guatemalan Congress. It redistributed unused land greater than 90 hectares (224 acres) in area to local peasants, compensating landowners with government bonds. Land from at most 1,700 estates was redistributed to about 500,000 individuals—one-sixth of the country's population. The goal of the legislation was to move Guatemala's economy from pseudo-feudalism into capitalism. Although in force for only eighteen months, the law had a major effect on the Guatemalan land-reform movement.

Indigenous groups, deprived of land since the Spanish conquest, were major beneficiaries of the decree. In addition to raising agricultural output by increasing the cultivation of land, the reform is credited with helping many Guatemalans find dignity and autonomy. The expropriation of land led major landowners–including the United Fruit Company–to lobby the United States government to intervene by construing the Guatemalan government as communist. Decree 900 was thus a direct impetus for the 1954 coup d'état, which deposed Árbenz and instigated decades of civil war.

== Background ==
When Árbenz was elected in 1951, Guatemala had a high GDP but extremely unequal distribution of land: 2% of the population controlled 72% of the arable land. Only 12% of this land was under cultivation. Much of the population without land was poor, and had associated health problems. Indigenous people had been treated as subordinate for hundreds of years, and had become increasingly impoverished and dependent on wages from plantation work. Indigenous people were also required to serve as migrant laborers through legal coercion, as Guatemala's coffee industry expanded rapidly from the 1870s through the 1930s.

After Juan Jose Arévalo won the 1944 election, Guatemala created a reformist constitution in 1945. This constitution explicitly stated that the government should protect communal land and create policies that would lead to equitable distribution of wealth. Article 88 of the 1945 Guatemalan Constitution, which served as the legal basis for Decree 900, stipulates: "It is a primary function of the State to develop agricultural activities and industry in general, toward the end that the fruits of labor shall preferentially benefit those who produce them and that the wealth shall reach the greatest number of inhabitants of the Republic." Article 90 recognizes the existence of private property, but suggests that rights to property could be waived in the social interest. This constitution marked the beginning of the Ten Years of Spring, also known as the Guatemalan Revolution: a period of democratization and liberal reforms.

Árbenz sought to transform Guatemala from a feudalist to a capitalist economy by distributing capital and creating infrastructure to increase production. The wish to transform Guatemala into a competitive capitalist nation led Árbenz to push for the construction of a national highway, a new port, a hydroelectric power plant—and for increased cultivation of unused lands.

== Legislation ==
Árbenz began promoting agrarian reform soon after becoming president. He was aided politically by a renewed Communist Party of Guatemala (PGT), which believed that some amount of capitalist development necessarily preceded a communist revolution. Árbenz accepted help from the PGT and its leaders were among his personal friends; however, he rejected some of their proposals, including a mandate for the organization of producer cooperatives.

The proposed law gained widespread support among peoples' organizations and in the national press, but was opposed by the Asociación General de Agricultores (AGA), which represented the existing landowners.

Presented with a draft by the President, the Guatemalan Congress met on Saturdays and Sundays for five weeks. Congress introduced some changes to Árbenz's version, most notably restoring the idea of cooperatives (although not to the degree proposed by the PGT). Decree 900—Ley de Reforma Agraria—was passed on 17 June 1952 at 1:45 AM and signed into law by Árbenz on the same day. It called for 603,704 ha (1,491,790 acres) of farmland to be redistributed to 100,000 families. Specifically, it authorized the redistribution of all uncultivated land on estates larger than 272 ha (672 acres), and of land on estates sized from 91–272 ha (224–672 acres), on which less than two-thirds of the land was cultivated. It also specified total redistribution of the government owned fincas nacionales, which contributed a quarter of the nation's coffee production.

Article 1 of the law reads:

The Agrarian Reform of the October Revolution intends to eliminate the feudal property structure in the countryside and develop relations of production that originate to develop the land to the form of operational and capitalist methods of production in agriculture and to prepare the way for the industrialization of Guatemala.

Proponents of the law stated that it was intended to “eliminate all feudal type property...especially work-servitude and the remnant of slavery”. Decree 900 specifically abolished slavery, unpaid labor, work as payment of rent, and relocation of indigenous workers.

=== Mechanisms ===
The law did not redistribute land automatically. It created a National Agrarian Department (DAN), and required people without land to file requests with Local Agrarian Committees (CALs). CALs would then make decisions about how to reappropriate the land of major owners. Landowners could dispute these decisions, with an appeals process going all the way up to the President. The committees were formed from local groups, and intended to foster the spirit of community control and local political power. As suggested by the PGT, the law also gave new landowners the option of choosing lifetime tenure instead of private ownership, with the goal of preventing large landowners from simply buying back the land. The Fincas Nationales were available only through the lifetime tenure option. According to José Manuel Fortuny, a PGT leader who helped draft the legislation:

We [the PGT] proposed the creation of peasant committees [CALs] in order to lay the groundwork for the eventual radicalization of the peasantry. We talked to Arbenz about this, and he agreed with us. What we wanted was to foster the control of the reform from below. This would give the peasants a strong sense of their common needs. And if, from the system of lifetime tenure, cooperatives developed, the seeds of a more collective society would have been sown.

Finally, the law established a system for using bonds to compensate people who lost acres to peasants. The property owners were paid in bonds which matured in 25 years; value of the land was based on claims made on the previous year's tax returns.

=== Land, literacy and credit ===
Credit for those receiving land was mandated by additional legislation in 1953, which also established a National Agrarian Bank (BNA). The government dispensed $3,371,185 in loans during 1953; $3,049,092 (around 90%) had been paid back by July 1954—a historically unusual success in lending.

Beginning in 1954, land and credit were supplemented by literacy programs—the third major plank of the reform program.

== Effects on Guatemala ==
=== Land and farming ===
By 1954, 570,000 ha (1,400,000 acres) had been reappropriated and 100,000 families (about 500,000 people, one sixth of the population) had received land as well as bank credit and technical aid. The law affected about 1,700 estates of the country's richest and most conservative people and groups

Production of corn, coffee, and bananas increased while the law was in effect in 1953 and 1954. High coffee prices bolstered the national economy and offset the flight of foreign capital. According to a report by the U.S. Embassy in 1954, "A preliminary analysis of the President's report left little doubt, as long as coffee prices are at their present high level, that the Guatemalan economy was basically prosperous."

Decree 900 led to the expropriation of 690 ha (1,700 acres) of Árbenz's own land and 490 ha (1,200 acres) belonging to foreign minister Guillermo Toriello. Minister of Agriculture Nicolás Brol also had some of his land redistributed.

=== Conflicts over implementation ===
Various sources (including Árbenz and the government) reported conflicts over implementing the law. Decree 900 triggered domestic opposition from landowners and some elements within the military. The reforms were also opposed by the Catholic Church and the business class.

Landowners complained of unfair practices, but so did others who felt excluded or that they were getting a bad deal. Some peasants seized land without going through the legal channels, believing that the law provided them with a mandate. Sometimes the expropriators fought each other over who would get a certain piece of land. Other violent incidents among peasants were self-defense or retaliation against landowners who sought to disobey the law or intimidate them. In some places, peasants organized groups for self-defense and requested (usually without success) arms permits from the government. According to Neale Pearson, there were instances where "peasants illegally occupied lands and a few in which they burned pastures or crops in order to have land declared uncultivated and subject to expropriation. But these cases were isolated and limited in number".

Sometimes legal councils had difficulty measuring land, or determining how much land on an estate was really unused.

Union representatives began to travel through the countryside, informing people of the new law. Landowners closed private roads going through their property in order to prevent peasants from becoming informed of the changes. The government announced that all road would become public. Some local police forces (and other government officials) initially sanctioned some landowner retaliation. These groups, too, responded to government pressure to implement the reforms.

=== Changes in political power ===
By 1954, more than 3000 CALs had been formed. These organizations, which controlled the distribution of land at a local level, represented a substantial increase in political power for ordinary people and people's organizations such as unions. However, the law also increased the power of the President and of the new national council, the DAN.

In 1953, the Supreme Court ruled that the lack of judicial oversight for the reform was unconstitutional, and it blocked any further implementation. Congress, with Árbenz's urging, voted to impeach four judges. This decision provoked anti-government demonstrations, in the course of which one person was killed.

Historian Douglas Trefzger has reported that the land reform disproportionately benefited Ladinos, relative to Indians. It seems that although the short-lived policies of Decree 900 had a positive effect on indigenous Guatemalans—particularly on their political consciousness—poverty and associated problems persisted.

The CNCG peasant league, founded in 1950 by activists and members of the teachers' union, grew rapidly during this time and by 1945 was the largest peoples' organization in the country. The second largest was the CGTG, a rural labor union.

Efforts were made to win military support for Decree 900. These included the provision of incentives for peasants to join the army, as well as attempts to foster ties between the armed forces and the DAN. Some conflicts did emerge around the country as military leaders and peasant organizers competed for local power. These were ameliorated by new appointments to military positions, though these changes in military structure further upset some officers and contributed to the desertions and defections that allowed the coup to succeed.

== International response and 1954 coup ==
=== Expropriation of United Fruit ===
In 1953 Árbenz announced that under the Agrarian Reform Law—specifically, because of an order made by the DAN—Guatemala was expropriating approximately 94,700 ha (234,000 acres) of uncultivated land from the United Fruit Company. United Fruit owned 550,000 acres (2,200 km^{2}) in Guatemala, 42% of the nation's (arable) land. The company was compensated with $627,572 in bonds for the expropriation of their holdings, the amount United Fruit had claimed the land was worth for tax purposes. However, United Fruit proceeded to claim that its land was worth more. It had close ties to U.S. officials and lobbied the U.S. for intervention. The US State Department, on behalf of the United Fruit Company, claimed to Guatemala that the land was worth $15,854,849.

=== United States opposition ===
A report written by the U.S. State Department's Office of Intelligence Research suggested that the reform itself would only affect 1,710 landowners, but expressed fear that the law would strengthen the position of communists in Guatemala. U.S. opposition to the Árbenz government certainly resulted from his reformist policies, but historians differ on the relative importance of expropriating United Fruit versus the apparent communist threat implied by land reform.

Because of the Agrarian Reform Law, the Wm. Wrigley Jr. Company in August 1952 announced that it would no longer purchase Guatemalan chicle. Since Wm. Wrigley Jr. Company had been the sole buyer of the product, the Árbenz government suddenly had to provide a massive aid program for chicle harvesters.

After aborting a coup attempt called Operation PBFortune, the United States—through its Central Intelligence Agency (CIA)—renewed efforts to unseat Árbenz with Operation PBSuccess (1953–1954). It sought to develop relationships with members of Guatemalan military, and instituted an arms blockade that caused the military to fear a security crisis or even US invasion. The key agent for a possible coup was the exiled colonel Castillo Armas. The CIA also intensified propaganda campaigns to isolate Guatemala among Central American nations, and to convince the Guatemalan people that the Árbenz regime was on the brink of collapse.

=== Military coup ===
In June 1954, Árbenz Guzmán was overthrown by a multi-faceted coup operation involving a small army led by Carlos Castillo Armas, scattered right-wing violence in the countryside, a U.S. Navy blockade (called Operation Hardrock Baker), bombardment by CIA planes, and a sophisticated CIA strategy of psychological warfare intended to demoralize Árbenz and provoke military defections. Thus, although Armas's ground invasion was quickly defeated, Árbenz resigned his post and Armas won control from the vacuum of power.

== Repeal ==
Armas became president on 8 July. He quickly repealed Decree 900 and reversed 95% of the redistribution that had occurred. (All of the land formerly owned by United Fruit was restored.) Government documents pertaining to Decree 900 were also destroyed. Armas created a new Agrarian Commission and passed two new laws, which restored control over land policy to government officials. Some land changed hands as a result of these laws, but the scope of reform was substantially reduced. Armas also abolished government support for labor unions and denounced their members as "communists".

A long period of civil war followed, with indigenous and poor Guatemalans fighting against landowners and the military. Peace accords reached in 1996 repudiate Armas's policy, and those that followed called for a return to the idea of land as a social good.

== See also ==
- History of Guatemala#Agrarian Reform and UFCo conflict
- Land reforms by country#Latin America
