= Nick Cullather =

American historian

Nick Cullather is an American historian and professor of history at Indiana University. His research interests include US diplomatic history and intelligence, and he is notable especially for his studies of the role of the CIA in coups and nation building in Latin America.

== Biography and career ==
Cullather graduated from Indiana University (AB 1981) before working as press secretary for US representative Lee H. Hamilton in the 1980s. He received his Ph.D. from the University of Virginia in 1993.

Cullather was recruited by the CIA as a graduate student in 1992 to investigate documents pertaining to PBSuccess, the operation that led to the 1954 Guatemalan coup d'état, as part of a larger review meant to determine which documents could be declassified. The result of that study was Secret History: The CIA's Classified Account of Its Operations in Guatemala, 1952-1954. Many of the documents discussed in the book had already been publicized by Philip Agee and others; Cullather's study, "the facsimile reproduction of an internal agency study", was released in 1997 before the CIA, in mid-1998, "aborted the entire declassification process". Cullather's study, according to Lars Schoultz, is "an exceptionally valuable document-not simply a lucid chronicle of who did what to whom, but a vivid cautionary tale about how the cloak of secrecy allowed government officials to avoid questions of perspective, of proportion, and of right and wrong". Historian Greg Grandin called it "an extremely important scholarly and pedagogical work".

Cullather's study of Philippines–United States relations, "Based on extensive research in U.S. and Philippine archives", was the subject of his 1994 book Illusions of Influence: The Political Economy of United States-Philippines Relations, 1942–1960. He argued that these relations were not as dominated by the United States as conventional wisdom dictates, that the client-patron relationship is often a complicated dynamic (for instance, the US were interested in military bases while the Philippines sought to control their own economy), and that "American influence--so often portrayed as fact in United States documents--is in many ways illusory".

Cullather was an editor at The Journal of American History, and is interviewed as an expert in a movie on gold mining in Guatemala, Gold Fever.

== Selected works ==
- Managing Nationalism: United States National Security Council Documents on the Philippines, 1953-1960. Quezon City: New Day Publishers. 1992.
- Illusions of Influence: The Political Economy of United States-Philippines Relations, 1942–1960. Stanford, CA: Stanford University Press. 1994.
- Secret History: The CIA's Classified Account of Its Operations in Guatemala, 1952–1954. Stanford, CA: Stanford University Press. 1999.
- The Hungry World: America's Cold War Battle Against Poverty in Asia. Cambridge, MA: Harvard University Press. 2010.
- "The War on the Peasant: The United States and the Third World". In Robert J. McMahon, ed., The Cold War in the Third World (pp. 192–207). New York, NY: Oxford University Press. 2013.
