= List of University of San Carlos of Guatemala people =

This article is an annex to Universidad de San Carlos. For information on the university, see: Universidad de San Carlos de Guatemala.

== A ==
Name	Occupation
Aceña Durán, Ramón (1895-1945)	pharmacist, poet, playwright and journalist
Aguilar Batres, Raúl (1910-1964)	civil engineer
Arenales Catalán, Emilio (1922-1969)	lawyer and diplomat
Arévalo Martínez, Rafael	writer, journalist and historian
Arjona, Ricardo	musician, singer and composer
Asturias, Miguel Angel (1899-1974)	lawyer, sociologist and Nobel prize winner writer
Aycinena y Piñol, Juan José (1792-1865)	conservative thinker, faculty member, politician, Catholic priest and bishop
Aycinena y Piñol, Mariano de (1789-1855)	conservative politician and entrepreneur

== B ==
Name	Occupation
Batres Jáuregui, Antonio (1847-1929)	lawyer, faculty member, politician and diplomat
Batres Montúfar, José (1809-1844)	poet, military officer and engineer
Bauer Paiz, Alfonso (1918-2011)	faculty member, lawyer and politician
Bianchi, Julio (1879-1958)	physician and surgeon, politician and diplomat

== C ==
Name	Occupation
Cáceres Lehnhoff, Eduardo (1906-1980)	lawyer, faculty member, phylinatropist and politician
Carranza Ramírez, Ramón (1819-1895) Costa Rica	lawyer and faculty member
Carrillo, Hugo (1929-1994)	playwright
Castañeda Heuberger, Aldo (1930- )	physician and surgeon
Castañeda de León, Oliverio (1955-1978)	student leader
Castillo, Otto René	guerrilla poet
Cerna, Ismael (1856-1901)	poet and army lieutenant
Colom Argueta, Manuel (1932-1979)	sociologist and politician
Coronado Aguilar, Manuel	lawyer, numismatist and historian

== D ==
Name	Occupation
David Hu	IIG cofounder, chief investment officer, jailed for running a Ponzi scheme
del Valle, José Cecilio	journalist and intellectual
Delgado and de León, José Matías El Salvador (1767-1832)	Catholic priest and politician
Díaz-Gomar, Roberto (1946- )	movie, theater and television actor

== F ==
Name	Occupation
Fernández-Hall Zúñiga, Francisca (1921-2002)	first female engineer in Central America, first female diplomat
Figueroa, Rodulfo Mexico (1866-1899)	poet and physician
Flores, José Felipe (1751-1814)	physician
Fortuny, José Manuel (1916-2005 )	Líder comunista
Fuentes Mohr, Alberto	economist and politician

== G ==
Name	Occupation
Galich, Manuel (1913-1984)	lawyer and playwright
Gómez Carrillo, Agustín	attorney, historian and intellectual
Gómez, Ignacio (1813-1879) El Salvador	diplomat, jurista, writer and journalist
González Palma, Luis (1957-)	professional photographer
Guerrero, José Gustavo (1876-1958) El Salvador	lawyer, diplomat and politician
Gutiérrez and Lizaurzábal, Agustín Costa Rica	lawyer
Guzmán-Böckler, Carlos	lawyer, historian and sociologist

== H ==
Name	Occupation
Herrera, Flavio	novel writer, journalist, and lawyer

== I ==
Name	Occupation
Irías Midence, José Nicolás (1774-1842)	Catholic priest

== L ==
Name	Occupation
Landívar, Rafael	poet, professor and Jesuit priest
Lanuza, Luigi	filmmaker
La Rue, Frank William	human rights activist
Larrazábal and Arrivillaga, Antonio (1769-1853)	Catholic priest, politician and diplomat
López, Carlos (1954-)	poet

== M ==
Name	Occupation
Maldonado Aguirre, Alejandro (1936-)	politician and lawyer
Marroquín Rojas, Clemente	lawyer, writer, journalist and historian
Martínez Peláez, Severo	faculty member, sociologist and historian
Marure, Alejandro (1806-1851)	faculty member, lawyer and historian
Mazariegos, Fernando	pharmacist
Mejía Colindres, VicenteHonduras	physician, surgeon, politician and broadcaster
Méndez, Francisco Alejandro (1964-)	writer and faculty member
Méndez de Penedo, Lucrecia (1943-)	ensayista and catedrática
Mijángos López, Adolfo (-1971)	lawyer, politician and faculty member
Milla and Vidaurre, José (1822-1882)	novel writer, historian and diplomat
Molina Mazariegos, Pedro (1777-1854)	physician, founding father and professor
Molina Orantes, Adolfo	lawyer, faculty member, phylinatropist
Monteforte Toledo, Mario (1911-2003)	writer, sociologist and politician
Montúfar, Lorenzo	historian, diplomat, lawyer and faculty member

== O ==
Name	Occupation
Orantes, Alfonso (1896-1985)	poet and lawyer
Orellana Pinto, José María (1872-1926)	engineer, military officer and politician
Osorio Paz, Saúl	economist, communist intellectual and university president

== P ==
Name	Occupation
Payeras, Mario (1940-1995)	guerilla leader and poet
Pontaza, Georgina (1976-)	actress, singer, choreographer, theater director and producer

== Q ==
Name	Occupation
Quintana Rodas, José B. Epaminondas (1896-1995)	writer and physician

== R ==
Name	Occupation
Ramirez de León, Ricardo Arnoldo (1929-1998)	lawyer and guerilla leader
Recinos, Adrián (1886-1962)	politician, historian, writer, diplomat and translator
Recinos, Efraín	architect, engineer and artist
Rosa Soto, Ramón (1848–1893)	lawyer, journalist, politician, liberal writer and thinker

== S ==
Name	Occupation
Soto Martínez, Marco Aurelio (1846-1908)	liberal politician and lawyer
Spínola, Rafael (1866-1901)	physician, public speaker, journalist and politician

== U ==
Name	Occupation
Urrutia Mendoza, Claudio	lieutenant colonel and civil engineer

== V ==
Name	Occupation
Vela, Francisco	lieutenant colonel and engineer
Vela Salvatierra, David	writer and journalist
Velásquez Nimatuj, Irma Alicia	Mayan anthropologist
Vian Morales, Oscar Julio (1947-)	Catholic priest and bishop
Villagrán Kramer, Francisco	lawyer and politician
Viñals, Jaime	mountaineer

== Z ==
Name	Occupation
Zavala, José Víctor	lawyer and military officer

== Presidents of Guatemala and other Central America countries ==
Name	Occupation	Country
Aycinena and Piñol, Mariano de	Governor of the State of Guatemala from 1827 to 1829	(Note: was the flag of the State of Guatemala until 1838.) Guatemala
Aycinena, Pedro de	Acting president in 1865	(Note: was the flag of the Republic of Guatemala under Rafael Carrera starting in 1858 and lasted until 1871.) Guatemala
Bográn, Luis (1849-1895)	President	Honduras
Cerezo, Vinicio	President from 1986 to 1991	Guatemala
Colom Caballeros, Alvaro	President from 2008 to 2012	Guatemala
José Matías Delgado	Head of State	El Salvador
Díaz Cabeza de Vaca, Alejandro El Salvador	First governor of the State of Guatemala from 1822 to 1824	Guatemala
Dueñas, Francisco	President	El Salvador
Escobar, José Bernardo	President from 1848 to 1849	(Note: was the flag of Guatemala from 1843 to 1851.) Guatemala
Estrada Cabrera, Manuel	President from 1898 to 1920	Guatemala (Note: Graduated from the Western College of Law, founded by Justo Rufino Barrios in 1877 .)
Herrera y Díaz del Valle, Justo Vicente José de (1786-1856)	Head of State	Honduras
Fernández Oreamuno, Próspero	President	Costa Rica
Gálvez, Mariano	Governor of the State of Guatemala from 1831 to 1838	Guatemala
Méndez Montenegro, Julio César	President from 1966 to 1970	Guatemala
Rivera Paz, Mariano	Governor of the State of Guatemala from 1838 to 1844	(Note: was the flag of Guatemala from 1838 to 1844.) Guatemala
Palma, Baudilio	Acting president in 1930	Guatemala
Salazar Castro, Carlos (1800 - 1867)	Acting head of State (1834, 1839)	El Salvador; Guatemala
Serrano Elías, Jorge	President from 1991 to 1993	Guatemala
Soto, Marco Aurelio	President from 1876 to 1880 and from 1881 to 1883	Honduras
del Valle, Andrés	President from January to May 1876	Honduras

== Notes and references ==
=== Bibliography ===
- Asociación de Amigos del País (2004). Diccionario histórico biográfico de Guatemala (in Spanish). Guatemala: Amigos del País, Fundación para la Cultura and el Desarrollo. ISBN 978-99922-44-01-2.
- Asturias, Miguel Ángel (1978). Viernes de Dolores (in Spanish). Buenos Aires: Lozada.
- Belaubre, Christophe (2015). "Larrazába, Antonio: Principales etapas de la vida de un influyente canónigo de la Iglesia Catedral de Guatemala que fue diputado a las Cortes de Cádiz en representación de Guatemala". AFEHC (in Spanish). Archived from the original on 24 July 2017.
- Carrera Mejía, Mynor (n.d.). Las Fiestas de Minerva en Guatemala, 1899-1919: El ansia de progreso and de civilización de los liberales (in Spanish). Costa Rica: Universidad de Costa Rica. Archived from the original on 2015-06-01.
- CEUR (1998). "Severo Martínez Peláez, In Memoriam: La Patria del Criollo, un cuarto de siglo después" (PDF). Centro de Estudios Urbanos and Regionales (USAC) (in Spanish). Archived from the original (PDF) on 2012-06-17.
- Chandler, David L. (1978). "La casa de Aycinena". Revista de la Universidad de Costa Rica (in Spanish). San José, Costa Rica.
- Corte internacional de La Haya (1955). "Nottebohm case (second phase). Judgement of April 6th, 1955" (PDF). I.C.J. Reports (in English and French): 4. Archived from the original (PDF) on 2012-02-10.
- Departamento de Estado (2005). "Laugerud García anuncia a su gabinete". Archivos del Gobierno de los Estados Unidos (in Spanish).
- Dueñas Van Severen, J. Ricardo (2006). La invasión filibustera de Nicaragua and la Guerra Nacional (PDF) (in Spanish). Secretaría General del Sistema de la Integración Centroamericana SG-SICA.
- González Davison, Fernando (2008). La montaña infinita; Carrera, caudillo de Guatemala (in Spanish). Guatemala: Artemis and Edinter. ISBN 978-84-89452-81-7.
- González Moraga, Miguel (2011). "Bauer Paiz, luchador social de toda la vida". Plaza Pública (in Spanish). Archived from the original on 24 July 2011.
- Hernández de León, Federico (1930). El libro de las efemérides (in Spanish). Vol. Tomo III. Guatemala: Tipografía Sánchez and de Guise.
- Hilton, Ronald (n.d.). Who's who in Latin America: A biographical dictionary of notable living men and women of Latin America (3a. corregida and aumentada ed.). Stanford, California: Stanford University Press. p. 44.
- Ishlaj Conde de González, Y.A. (2006). "Clemente Marroquín Rojas, su vida and su obra" (PDF). Tesis (in Spanish). Guatemala: Universidad de San Carlos de Guatemala.
- Illescas, Illescas (14 May 2015). "Maldonado Aguirre ¿la tercera es la vencida?". Albedrío (in Spanish). Guatemala. Archived from the original on 14 May 2015.
- La Hora (2012). "Manuel Colom Argueta, a 33 años de su asesinato". Diario la Hora (in Spanish). Archived from the original on 25 March 2012.
- Martiano, Camilo (2013). "Información sobre Alfonso Bauer" (in Spanish). "Martiano fue secretario de Relaciones Internacionales de Alfonso Bauer en el Nuevo Frente Popular, fundado en 2008 and que luego sería el SDS."
- Martínez, Robin (2009). "Los genios de las artes en Guatemala, ahora son licenciados". CGN Buenas Noticias (in Spanish). Guatemala. Archived from the original on 23 December 2014.
- Mendoza, Juan Manuel (1946). Biografía de Enrique Gómez Carrillo: Su vida, su obra and su época (in Spanish) (2^{a}. ed.). Guatemala: Tipografía Nacional.
- Móbil, A. (1991). 100 Personajes Históricos de Guatemala (in Spanish). Guatemala: Serviprensa Centroamericana.
- Molina Jiménez (2001). "La Polémica de "El problema (1899)", de Máximo Soto Hall". Revista Mexicana del Caribe (in Spanish). VI (12). Red de Revistas Científicas de América Latina, el Caribe, España and Portugal;Sistema de Información Científica.
- Montúfar, Lorenzo; Salazar, Ramón A. (1892). El centenario del general Francisco Morazán (in Spanish). Guatemala: Tipografía Nacional.
- Quintana, Epaminondas [in Spanish] (1971). Historia de la generación del 20 (in Spanish). Guatemala: Tipografía Nacional.
- Ramírez, Alberto (2004). "Las zonas fantasma de la capital". Prensa Libre (in Spanish). Guatemala. Archived from the original on 2007-07-10.
- Recinos, Adrián (1962). Poesías de José Batres Montúfar (in Spanish). Guatemala: José de Pineda Ibarra.
- Rosa, Ramón (1974). Historia del Benemérito Gral. Don Francisco Morazán, ex Presidente de la República de Centroamérica (in Spanish). Tegucigalpa: Ministerio de Educación Pública, Ediciones Técnicas Centroamericana.
- Sabino, Carlos (2007). Guatemala, la historia silenciada. 1944-1989. Parte I: Revolución and Liberación (in Spanish). Guatemala: Fondo de Cultura Económica.
- Seguros Universales (2013). "Georgina Pontaza". Guatemaltecos Ilustres (in Spanish). Guatemala: Seguros Universales. Archived from the original on 11 December 2014.
- Siglo 21 (14 May 2015). "Quiero ser unificador; no soy miembro de ningún partido politician". Siglo 21 (in Spanish). Guatemala. Archived from the original on 14 May 2015.
- Sitio oficial de Carlos Valenti (n.d.). "Carlos Valenti and sus amigos". Carlos Valenti, Sitio Web Oficial (in Spanish). Archived from the original on 28 July 2014.
- St. James Press (1996). "Luis González Palma". Contemporary Photographers (in Spanish) (3^{a}. ed.). St. James Press.
- Tobar, G. (1994). "La obra lírica de Flavio Herrera". Colección Centenario de Flavio Herrera (in Spanish). III. Guatemala: publisher Universitaria, Universidad de San Carlos de Guatemala.
- UNAM (n.d.). "Directorio de la Facultad". Facultad de Ciencias Jurídicas de la Universidad Nacional Autónoma de México. México.
- United Nations. "Emilio Arenales Catalán". United Nations Biography. Nueva York.
- Woodward Jr., Ralph Lee (2002). Rafael Carrera and la creación de la República de Guatemala, 1821–1871. Serie Monográfica (in Spanish). CIRMA and Plumsock Mesoamerican Studies. ISBN 978-0-910443-19-7. Archived from the original on 2019-03-01.
- Woodward Jr., Ralph Lee (1993). Rafael Carrera and the Emergence of the Republic of Guatemala, 1821-1871 (online edition) (in Spanish). Athens, Georgia: University of Georgia Press. ISBN 9780820343600.
