= Roberto González =

Roberto González may refer to:

== Artists and entertainers ==
- Roberto González Goyri (1924–2007), Guatemalan painter
- Roberto González Echevarría (born 1943), Cuban-born literature critic
- Roberto González-Monjas (born 1988), Spanish classical violinist and conductor

== Sportspeople ==
- Roberto González (racing driver) (born 1976), Mexican racing driver
- Roberto González (Argentine footballer) (born 1976), Argentine football midfielder
- Roberto González (Chilean footballer) (born 1976), Chilean football goalkeeper
- Roberto González (cyclist) (born 1994), Panamanian cyclist
- Roberto González Bayón (born 2001), Spanish football winger

== Other ==
- Roberto González Nieves (born 1950), Puerto Rican clergyman
- Roberto González Barrera (1930–2012), Mexican businessman
