= Goyri =

Goyri is a Basque surname. Notable people with the surname include:

- María Goyri (1873–1955), Spanish academic and advocate
- Roberto González Goyri (1924–2007), Guatemalan painter, sculptor, and muralist
- Sergio Goyri (born 1958), Mexican actor
