= Jaime Viñals =

Guatemalan mountain climber

Jaime Viñals Massanet
- Born: November 17, 1966 (age 59); Guatemala City, Guatemala
- Education: Universidad de San Carlos (Biology)
- Occupations: Mountaineer, author, motivational speaker
- Known for: First Central American and Caribbean climber to summit Mount Everest (2001); Completing the Seven Summits (2001); Completing the Seven Islands of the World; Completing the Seven Volcanic Summits (2023); First person to finish the 7+7+7 Trilogy (2023)
- Notable work: The Mountain is My Destiny (1999); Everest... That's How I Conquered Its Top (2001); The Conquest of Seven Challenges (2002); Beyond Everest (2004); See You at the Top (2006); Guatemala... Land of Volcanoes (2008); It All Starts with a Dream (2022)
- Awards: Orden del Quetzal (1995)
- Website: jaimevinals.com

Jaime Viñals Massanet (born November 17, 1966) is a Guatemalan mountaineer, the first person from Central America and Caribbean region ever to climb the Earth's highest peak, Mount Everest, after reaching the summit together with the American Andy Lakpass and the Danish Asmus Noreslet on an expedition from New Zealand organized by Russell Brice, Since then, he became one of the few people to have reached the Seven Summits - the highest mountains of each of the seven (sub-)continents. also he has finished to climb the Seven Islands of the World.

== Biography ==
In January 2023, completed the challenge of the Trilogy 7 Summits + 7 Islands + 7 Volcanoes of the World, which consists of climbing the Seven Summits of the World, plus the Seven Islands of the World, plus the Seven Volcanic Summits of the World.

Seven Summits of the World is reaching the highest peak of the seven continents of the planet, these are: Mt. Aconcagua (South America); Mt. Denali (North America); Mt. Kilimanjaro (Africa); Mt. Elbrus (Europe); Carstensz Pyramid and/or Mt. Kosciusko (Oceania); Mt. Vinson (Antarctica) and Mt. Everest (Asia).

Seven Islands of the World is reaching the top of the highest peaks of the seven largest islands in the world, these are: Mt. Kerinci (island of Sumatra); Mt. Kinabalu (island of Borneo); Mt. Fuji (Honshu Island); Mt. Whilhelm (New Guinea Island); Mt. Tete Blanche (Baffin Island); Mt. Gunnbjorns Fjeld (Greenland island) and Mt. Maromokotro (Madagascar island).

Seven Volcanic Summits of the World is to reach the top of the highest volcano of the seven continents of the planet, these are: Ojos del Salado (South America); Pico de Orizaba (North America); Kilimanjaro (Africa); Elbrus (Europe); Damavand (Asia); Giluwe (Oceania) and Sidley (Antarctica).

On January 18, 2023, he reached the summit of the Sidley volcano in Antarctica together with Celine Jaccard (Switzerland);Nilavishek Mukherjee (India);Caroline Leon (Australia);Marie-Pier Desharnais (Canada);Adrian Ahritculesei (Romania);Vambola Sipelgas (Estonia);Thierry Dewambrechies (France);Robert Gropel (Australia) & Eli Potter (Alaska). On an expedition organized by Antarctic Logistics.

This summit allowed him to be the first person in the World to have completed the project of the 7+7+7 Trilogy.

He has published seven books titled:

1) The Mountain is my destiny (1999) 2) Everest... that's how I conquered its top (2001) 3) The Conquest of Seven Challenges (2002) 4) Beyond Everest (2004) 5) See you at the top ( 2006) 6) Guatemala... land of volcanoes (2008) 7) It all starts with a dream (2022).

All written in Spanish currently.

All can be purchased in digital format (eBook) on his website: https://www.jaimevinals.shop and https://www.jaimevinals.com sites where there is extensive information about the life of Jaime Viñals, his achievements and his upcoming challenges, as well as such as motivational, coaching and leadership messages.

Born in Guatemala City, Viñals studied biology at the Universidad de San Carlos. He began climbing locally in 1987, aged 26. Since then, he has climbed over 300 mountains in 42 countries.

Viñals first attempted to get to the top of Mount Everest in the spring of 1994. After having passed the 8,000 meters mark, the expedition was unsuccessful at reaching the summit due to the inclement weather, and had to return. The group, however, succeeded at establishing a new ascending route. Viñals returned to the Everest in the spring of 1999, climbing through the South Col route. While climbing, he injured himself, again unable to complete the ascent.

Viñals had climbed all the other peaks of the Seven Summits challenge, including the ones listed on alternate definitions of the summit list, but still had not reached the peak of Everest. In 2001, he attempted the ascent for the third time. Using the less frequented North Col as the climbing route, he and others reached the summit of the Everest on May 23. Viñals became the third Latin American person to climb to the peak of Everest and to complete the ascent to the Seven Summits, and the first from Central America or the Caribbean to achieve such feats.

In 2002, Viñals embarked on an attempt to climb the highest peak of each of the seven largest islands in the world. This project involves climbing the highest summit of the seven largest islands of the world:

Island	Mountain Name	Altitude
Greenland	Gunnbjørn Fjeld	3693 m
New Guinea	Wilhelm	4509 m
Borneo	Kinabalu	4101 m
Madagascar	Maromokotro	2876 m
Baffin Island	Tête Blanche	2156 m
Sumatra	Kerinci	3800 m
Honshū	Fuji	3776 m

Viñals has been involved in a project to climb the '50 Most Prominent Peaks on Earth'. As of March 2016 he has attained 33 of them.

== Honours ==
In 1995, Viñals was awarded the Orden del Quetzal from Guatemalan President Ramiro de León Carpio.

== See also ==
- List of climbers
