= José Felipe Flores =

Guatemalan doctor (1751–1824)

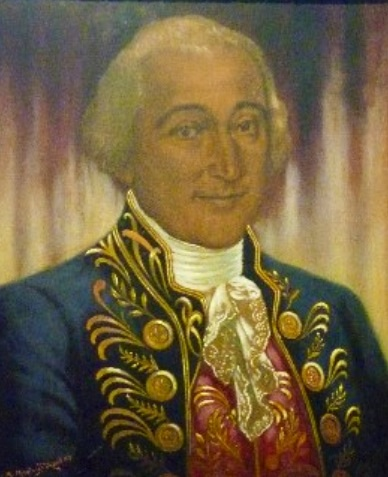
- José Felipe Flores portrait
- Born: 1 May 1751; Ciudad Real, Chiapas, Kingdom of Guatemala, Spanish Empire
- Died: 20 June 1824 (aged 73); Madrid, Spain
- Education: Real y Pontificia Universidad de San Carlos Borromeo
- Occupation: Physician
- Works: Específico nuevamente descubierto en Guatemala para la cura del Cáncer y otras enfermedades más frecuentes
- Awards: Official doctor of Guatemala; Personal physician of the King of Spain

José Felipe Flores (Ciudad Real, Chiapas, Kingdom of Guatemala 1 May 1751 – Madrid, Spain 20 June 1824) was a medical doctor and Medicine teaching pioneer in Central America. He graduated from the Royal and Pontifical University of San Carlos Borromeo, and in 1781 became a faculty member of both the University and San Juan de Dios Hospital.

== Biography ==
Flores arrived at a very young age to Santiago de los Caballeros de Guatemala and studied in the Jesuit school; then we attended the Royal and Pontifical University of San Carlos Borromeo where he graduated with a B.S. in Medicine in 1773.

Using an inoculation method when there was a measles outbreak in Guatemala in 1780. The epidemic was contained and Dr. Flores obtained great success with the introduction of the vaccine in the kingdom. In 1785 he gave the hospital medical equipment and he considered as the founding father of Medicine education in both Guatemala and in Central America.

He was a faculty member in the college of Medicine and, in order to make Anatomy and Physiology studies easier, designed and built life size statues that showed the organs of the human body; the organs could be removed and placed back according to the students needs. The mannequins also helped in the teaching of Osteology, Myology and other related medical sciences. He also helped in Optics, with lenses that he invented.

In 1797, with a scholarship from the government, Flores went on a four-year journey where he visited several American and European medical facilities. In Philadelphia he learned about Luigi Galvani's electrical experiments with frogs and later on he made studies on this of his own. When he arrived in Italia, he not only met Galvani, but Felice Fontana as well, whom he admired as scientist and maker of anatomic wax models. In Madrid, in 1803, he get in contact with Antoni de Gimbernat and made a report before the Surgeons Board about the need of a vaccination campaign in Spanish America, supported by the government.

== Awards ==
- In recognition of his multiple merits, he was appointed as the first legal doctor in Guatemala, leading the Medical Board Court.
- Due to his massive medical skills, the King of Spain appointed him as his personal physician.
- Starting in 1900, the College of Medicine of the National University (Note: Name of the University of San Carlos of Guatemala between 1875 and 1918, and then between 1920 y 1944.) granted the "José Felipe Flores" award to the best doctoral thesis each year at the Fiestas Minervalias.

== Works ==
Flores wrote several medical documents, among them one called Específico nuevamente descubierto en Guatemala para la cura del Cáncer y otras enfermedades más frecuentes (Newly discovered specific in Guatemala to cure Cancer and other more frequent illnesses). The cure consisted on eating small meatballs from a small lizard common to certain regions in Central America. The document was translated into French and German, and was discussed in medical forums. The lizard was included as curative in the medical lexicon.

== Death ==
Flores died in Madrid, Spain, in 1824.

== In Literature ==
He is the famous "doctor Sánchez", who appears in José Milla y Vidaurre's Memorias de un Abogado (A lawyer's memoirs).

== See also ==
- Santiago de los Caballeros de Guatemala
- University of San Carlos of Guatemala
