= Luigi Lanuza =

Guatemalan film actor, director, and producer

Luigui Geovani Lanuza Estrada is a Guatemalan actor and producer.

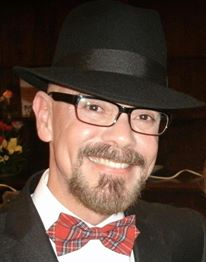
Luigi Lanuza

== Early life ==
Lanuza is the son of Rafael Launza, a pioneering director of Guatemalan cinema. He appeared in several movies in the 1970s including Superzan y el niño del Espacio (1972) and Terremoto en Guatemala (1976). He graduated in 1983 from Universidad de San Carlos de Guatemala, becoming a doctor. He later moved to San Francisco, California and worked with the Hispanic community. While in San Francisco, he was the spokesperson of the city's Public Health Department on the TV channels Univision and Telemundo.

== Return to Guatemala ==
Following his career as a doctor, he returned to Guatemala and became involved in the movie industry again. He produced Soy de Zacapa, a film inspired a popular Guatemalan song which was turned into a script by his father. The film debuted in 2011.

As of June 2015, Lanuza is working on El Señor de Esquipulas, his latest film. It is set to premiere in Hollywood in August 2015.

He was also involved in the production of several consumer brands' advertising.

== Filmography ==
- Navidad para el olvido (2021), short film broadcast on Guatevisión
