= Luis González Palma =

Guatemalan photographer (born 1957)

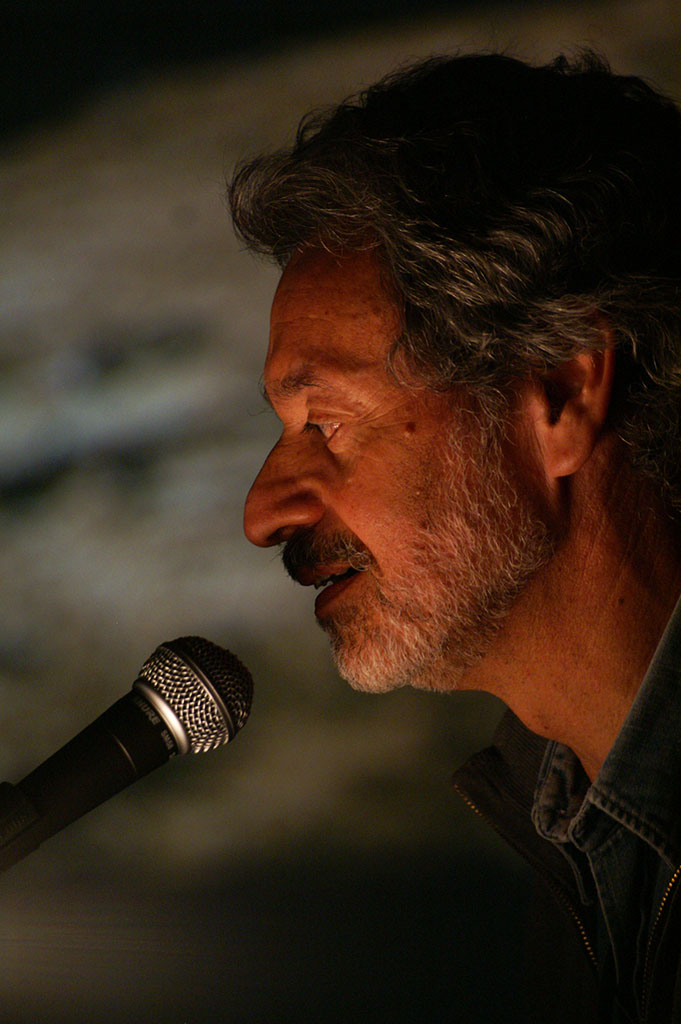
- Palma during FotoArtFestival, Poland, 2011
- Born: 1957 (age 68–69); Guatemala City, Guatemala
- Education: Universidad de San Carlos de Guatemala
- Occupation: Photographer
- Known for: Photography, contemporary art

Luis González Palma (born 1957) is a Guatemalan photographer. Much of his work "has revolved around the strange hybrids of race and culture that add up to Latin America."

== Early life and education ==
Luis González Palma was born in Guatemala City, Guatemala in 1957. He trained to be an architect at Universidad de San Carlos de Guatemala.

== Career ==
González Palma began a career in photography and video. His first individual exhibition, Autoconfesion, was in 1989 at the Museum of Contemporary Hispanic Art, New York, and had a breakthrough at the Houston FotoFest in 1992. He contributed to the production of The Death and the Maiden in the Malmö Opera, 2008.

== Awards and recognition ==
González Palma was awarded the Gran Premio PHotoEspaña award in 1999 and exhibited his work in the 49th and 51st Venice Biennale.

== Publications ==
- Il Silencio Dei Maya. Verona: Peliti, 1998. ISBN 978-84-7782-576-0.
- Luis González Palma: Poems of Sorrow. Santa Fe: Arena, 1999. With text by John Wood. ISBN 978-1-892041-05-0.
- Luis González Palma. Madrid: Fabrica, 2014. ISBN 978-84-15691-88-4.
