= Oliverio Castañeda =

- Born: 12 October 1955; Guatemala City, Guatemala
- Died: 20 October 1978 (aged 23); Guatemala City, Guatemala
- Occupation: Student Leader

Oliverio Castañeda de León (October 12, 1955 – October 20, 1978) was a Guatemalan left-wing oriented student leader, who fought for civil rights and was assassinated in Guatemala City during the regime of General Romeo Lucas García.

== Activism ==
Castañeda was born in Guatemala City, into a middle class family. He started attending the Department of Economics at the Universidad de San Carlos de Guatemala (USAC) in 1975, and became a dynamic member of the Students' Association (Asociación de Estudiantes Universitarios, AEU) of the USAC, to which he was elected secretary general on May 22, 1978. He was highly involved in political activities, and organized many protest marches against the government in response to state-sponsored human rights violations. In September 1978 he helped organize a general strike to protest sharp increases in public transportation fares. The government responded harshly, arresting dozens of protesters and injuring many more. As a result of the campaign, the government agreed to the protesters' demands, including the establishment of a public transportation subsidy. On October 6, a former directive of the Mail and Telegraph Workers' Syndicate was assassinated by a death squad.

== Assassination ==
On October 19, the eve of a traditional march to commemorate the 1944 Revolution, a death threat against 39 citizens was made by the self-proclaimed Anti-Communist Army (Ejército Secreto Anticomunista, ESA), a list including Oliverio Castañeda's name. Due to the recent events, measures had been adopted to protect Castañeda even before these threats. However, he and other leaders decided to participate in the October 20 March.

The march concluded without incidents in the Parque Centenario near the government palace (Palacio Nacional), where Castañeda gave a speech in which he pointed out violations to human rights involving state security forces. The famous final words of his speech, "They can kill our leaders, but as long as there are people, there will be revolution", were tragically visionary. Around 1 p.m., he and a group of students walked away from the park and when they crossed the Sexta Avenida, a major street of Guatemala City, one block away from the Palacio Nacional, several gunshots started, and a man got off a car opening fire with a machine gun against Castañeda. The latter was reached by a bullet and fell, and after that another man coming out of another vehicle stopped and gave him the coup de grâce. The perpetrators left the crime scene without the intervention of any policemen in the surroundings, and Castañeda died shortly after that due to the several lethal wounds. Other people were injured during the shooting. The finishing shot was an evidence that Castañeda had been the victim of a deliberate attack, in the same context as other similar cases affecting student leaders, and was linked to a government speech accusing the USAC of subversive activity.

== Consequences ==
The impunity of this crime, and the lack of investigation from state authorities led the Guatemalan Historical Clarification Commission (Comisión para el Esclarecimiento Histórico, CEH) to consider Castañeda's death a violation of human rights, and to presume the Intelligence Division of the Estado Mayor Presidencial to be responsible for it.

The Universidad de San Carlos's students' association was soon after renamed Asociación de Estudiantes Universitarios" Oliverio Castañeda de León". The segment of the street in which he was killed was renamed "Oliverio Castañeda de León" in his honor in 2003.

30 years after Oliverio Castañeda's murder, the president of Guatemala, Álvaro Colom awarded him the country's highest award, the "Orden del Quetzal". The president asked his family for forgiveness on behalf of the Guatemalan government and expressed: "A medal can't bring even a second of his life back, but will serve to give testimony of his life". The award was received by his mother and other members of his family.

== Sources ==
- "1978: The popular movement"
- (in Spanish) "A 25 años de su muerte, Oliverio Castañeda de León: ejemplo de liderazgo"
- (in Spanish) "A 24 años del asesinato de Oliverio Castañeda de León, impunidad aún se mantiene"
- (in Spanish) "Homenaje a Oliverio Castañeda"
- (in Spanish) "Colom pide perdón por asesinato de Oliverio Castañeda de Leon"
