= Roberto González Goyri =

Guatemalan artist (1924–2007)

Roberto González Goyri

Roberto González Goyri (1924 in Guatemala City – November 13, 2007 in Guatemala City) was a Guatemalan painter, sculptor and muralist. His work was shown at the Museum of Modern Art in New York City, among other venues. He was notable for his figurative reliefs, free-standing sculptures in stone or metal, and semi-abstract painting in his later years.

== Early years ==
At the age of 14, he entered the National Academy of Fine Arts where he studied with Rafael Yela Günther. He then spent times as a draftsman at Guatemala's National Museum of Archeology. Between 1948 and 1952, he studied at the Arts Students League and Sculpture Center of New York on a grant from the Guatemalan government.

== Career ==
Goyri belonged to the group of artists later called the Generación del 40 ("Generation of 1940") whose work was associated with the period of democracy after the Guatemalan Revolution of 1944. He returned to Guatemala in 1952 where he developed his work and was director of the National Arts School. Within Guatemala, his works include a 1959 mural at the Guatemalan Institute of Social Security, and he executed a number of important reliefs in Guatemala City between 1964 and 1966.

Through his association with the School of Architecture at the National University, Goyri, Guillermo Grajeda-Mena, Dagoberto Vasquez and Efrain Recinos created the Civic Center, a building that combined their talents in the fields of architecture, art and sculpture. Goyri was the illustrator in the Cubism genre of the 2002 children's book, El monstruo de la calle de colores, by the Guatemalan writer Mario Payeras.

He exhibited in Spain, the United States, Ecuador and Nicaragua. His work, the semiabstract sculpture entitled The Wolf (1951) was acquired by New York's MOMA. Other works are at the Museo Nacional de Arte Moderno "Carlos Mérida" of Guatemala, and Port Royal Library in Paris. Other works, sculptures and murals, that are in Guatemala are located at the Liberation Boulevard Tecun Uman, the National Museum of Archaeology and Ethnology, and Venetian Boulevard Los Heroes.

He died in Guatemala City on November 13, 2007.

== Awards ==
In 1951, he won a prize and international recognition in a contest sponsored by the London Institute of Contemporary Arts. In 1958, he was awarded the Order of the Quetzal, and in 1966, he won first prize at the American Exhibition of Arts and Sciences and Fine Arts.
