= Mario Payeras =

- Born: 1940
- Died: 1995 (aged 54–55)
- Burial place: Mexico
- Education: the University of San Carlos
- Occupations: Guatemalan writer, philosopher, poet, essayist and guerrilla leader.

Mario Payeras (1940–1995) was a Guatemalan writer, philosopher, poet, essayist and guerrilla leader.

Mario Payeras born in Chimaltenango, Guatemala in 1940. He died in Mexico in 1995. He studied philosophy at the University of San Carlos, in the Autonomous University of Mexico (UNAM), and the University of Leipzig, Germany . Youth was a member of the Guatemalan Labor Party (Partido Guatemalteco del Trabajo), which provided intellectuals with scholarships to socialist countries. In Cuba, Payeras was part of the ranks of the Guerrilla Army of the Poor (Ejército Guerrillero de los Pobres or EGP) in 1968, as one of its founders and a member of its Dirección Nacional. Payeras was the ideologist of EGP's military-political strategy.

Payeras was part of the first contingent that forms the original focus of the EGP in the jungles of Ixcan where he wrote his first novel about Los Días de la Selva (The Days of the Jungle). After the military offensive of the dictatorial regime in 1981–82, he contemplated the military defeat of the rebellion in his work Los fusiles de Octubre (October Rifles) and El Trueno en la Ciudad (Thunder in the City). The work argues for a change in strategy of revolutionary struggle but it was rejected by EGP. As a result Payeras broke away from the organization in 1984 citing ethical, political and ideological differences. Along with a prominent contingent of cadres that followed him, he formed a new armed revolutionary organization called Octubre Revolucionario (Revolutionary October).

Abandoned years later by several of his followers, Payeras died in hiding in Mexico City. His remains were buried in a remote cemetery in southeastern Mexico along with the legendary guerrilla leader Marco Antonio Yon Sosa and an Achi indigenous guerrilla leader. A few years after, the remains of Payeras were stolen by criminals and have since disappeared.

He is remembered as a writer to win the Casa de las Americas Prize for his play The Days of the Jungle (1981). He was included in the Dictionary of Guatemalans Authors and Critics and has influenced several prominent Guatemalan writers like Francisco Alejandro Mendez and others.

His works been translated into several languages including English and German.

== Works ==
The Days of the Jungle /Los Días de la Selva (1981)

The Thunder in the City / El Trueno en la Ciudad (testimonial/autobiography, 1987)

The World as Flower and Invention/ El Mundo como Flor y como Invento (short stories 1987)

Latitude of the Flower and the Hailstone / Latitud de la Flor y el Granizo (ecological essay, 1991)

The Guns of October / Los Fusiles de Octubre (military essays, 1991)

Siege on Utopia / Asedio a la Utopía (ensayo, 1996)

Poems from the Queenly Zone Poemas de la Zona Reina (poetry, 1997)
