= Universidad de San Carlos de Guatemala =

Public university in Guatemala City, Guatemala

Coordinates: 14.5829°N 90.5529°W

University of San Carlos of Guatemala
- Universidad de San Carlos de Guatemala
- Other name: USAC
- Former names: Royal and Pontifical University of San Carlos of Guatemala (1676–1829) Science Academy (1834–1840)
- Motto: Id y enseñad a todos
- Motto in English: Go forth and teach everyone
- Type: Public
- Established: 1676; 350 years ago
- Founder: Charles II of Spain
- Rector: Rodolfo Chang
- Students: 230,000 in 2021
- Location: Guatemala City, Guatemala
- Campus: Urban
- Colors: Blue
- Sporting affiliations: USAC
- Website: www.usac.edu.gt

The Universidad de San Carlos de Guatemala (USAC, University of San Carlos of Guatemala) is the largest and oldest university of Guatemala; it is also the fourth founded in the Americas. Established in the Kingdom of Guatemala during the Spanish colony, it was the only university in Guatemala until 1954, (Note: In 1954 a coup led by the National Liberation Movement which was sponsored by the United Fruit Company and coordinated by CIA and State Department American operatives who had links with the US company triumphed .) although it continues to hold distinction as the only public university in the entire country.

The university grew out of the Colegio de Santo Tomás de Aquino (Saint Thomas Aquinas High School), founded in 1562 by Bishop Francisco Marroquín. After a series of major earthquakes in 1773, which destroyed many parts of the city of Santiago de los Caballeros, the crown authorities ordered the evacuation of the city and the relocation of its government, religious and university functions to the new capital La Nueva Guatemala de la Asunción, the university's present location. In the early years, from the 16th to 19th centuries, it offered studies in civil and liturgical law, theology, philosophy, medicine and indigenous languages.

== History ==
=== First era: Royal and Pontifical University of San Carlos Borromeo ===
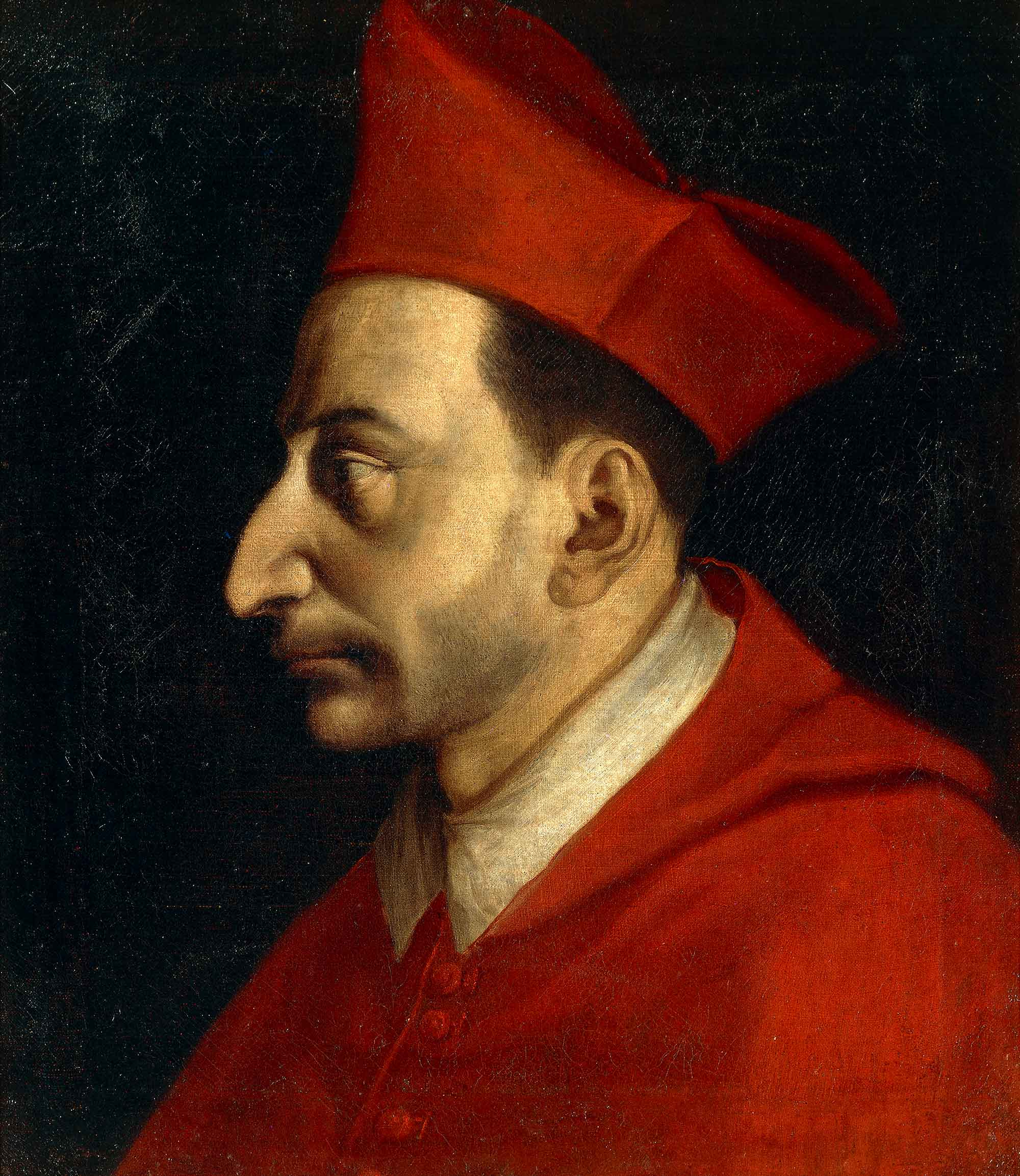
Saint Carlo Borromeo, by Giovanni Ambrogio Figino. Oil on canvas, 41 × 48 cm. Biblioteca Ambrosiana. The University of San Carlos was established under his protection on 31 January 1676.

The university tradition in Guatemala and Central America goes back to the 17th century, when the University of San Carlos was founded on 31 January 1676 by Royal Decree of Carlos II in the colonial capital of Santiago de los Caballeros de Guatemala. The Royal University of San Carlos became the third Royal College founded in Spanish America and it was consecrated by Pope Innocent XI on June 18, 1687.

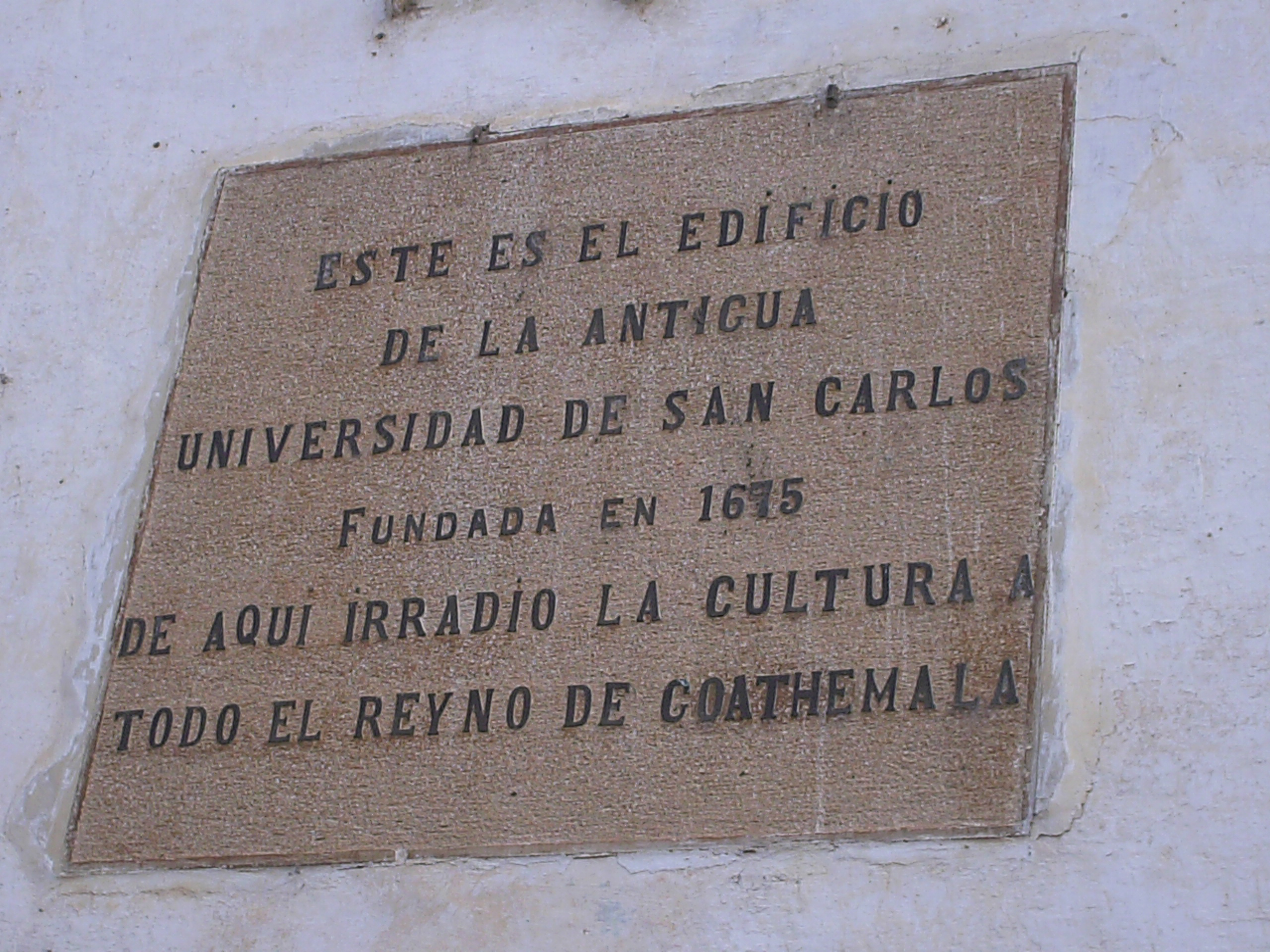
Section of the memorial to the first University in the city of Antigua Guatemala

Colonization by the Spaniards implied a new formation of society, with its brand new civil and ecclesiastical institutions. As time went by, residents demanded a place in the royal institutions for their descendants, in return for the heroics of their ancestors during the battles of conquest. However, there were no schools to teach youth to become public servants.

It was not until the second half of the 16th century that the first initiatives to found schools that covered more than religious indoctrination and reading and writing took place. The first bishop of Guatemala, Francisco Marroquín, requested the approval of the Spanish crown to set up a grammar class, in which Latin was to be taught, as it was the intellectual language of the time. This single fact has been the basis to perpetuate the myth that links bishop Marroquin to the early stages of the University of San Carlos. (Note: Among those historians that have perpetuated the myth is Juan Rodríguez Cabal, who presented a letter that Marroquín sent to Spain in 1548 requesting the establishment of a university. Rodríguez Cabal's investigations were published for the first time in the 1950s, and as part of the third centennial of the foundation of the University of San Carlos in 1976, the University of San Carlos press made several more copies.)

Towards the end of his life, in 1562, Marroquin left in his will some funds to set up a school, the Santo Tomás de Aquino, where Grammar, Arts, Philosophy and Theology would be taught. The beneficiaries of this enterprise would be the children of poor Spaniards, given that they could not travel to cities (like Mexico) where the Royal Universities were. This will has been also interpreted by scholars as the origin of the University of San Carlos. However, the late priest had a clear idea of the difference between a school (i.e., a home for students, with or without classes) and a university (or General Study) where the students earned degrees. About this, historian John Tate Lanning wrote that "his will is so well known that there are some scholars that have not even seen it and have already read a lot of things that are not there at all. Nowhere in his will Marroquín talks about any university, much less talk about his intentions to establish one..." On the other hand, what is documented is that major Pedro Crespo Suárez left in his will twenty thousand pesos to set up the classes for the university that is "in the works with the authorities".

In 1598, the third bishop of Guatemala Gómez Fernández de Córdoba y Santillán, O.S.H., following ecclesiastical directions from the Council of Trent and on the basis of the royal decrees issued after that council, authorized the foundation of the "Nuestra Señora de la Asunción" School and Seminary, which was the first higher educational institution in the Kingdom of Guatemala. The Jesuits, who already had their Colegio de San Borja and wanted to run the seminary themselves, opposed its foundation, as they did not like other regular orders – Mercedarians, Franciscans and Dominicans or the leader of the secular clergy took an initiative in religious and educational matters.

The president of the Real Audiencia authorized that classes should start while they were awaiting the authorization to build the new school for the students; at the time they only had one classroom in the Dominican convent where, in theory, they gave the Arts, Theology and Religion classes. After several decades, discussions and petitions, king Carlos II on 31 January 1676, granted a license to the city of Santiago de los Caballeros de Guatemala to found a university. This would be third royal university in the Spanish Empire in America, and the second in New Spain, after the one in Mexico. (Note: To review the process that led to the foundation of the University of San Carlos, it is recommended to read procedure 373 of the Guatemalan Real Audiencia en the General Archive of Indias.) After the disputatious process of organization, and five years after the royal decree, the university started officially its lectures of five of the nine classes, on 7 January 1681, with little more of sixty registered students and with its first president, Dr. José de Baños y Soto Mayor, who was in charge of the cathedral, Preacher of the King of Spain and Doctor from the University of Osuna. (Note: About the first setup of the university, the historical records are not too precise and even contradictory. See in the Central American General Archive, A1. Leg. 1885, Exp. 12245.) The university started under the protection of San Carlos Borromeo, with its first directive written by Francisco Saraza y Arce, who copied from those of the University of Mexico which, in turn, were adapted from the Universidad de Salamanca in Spain.

==== First graduates and science teaching ====
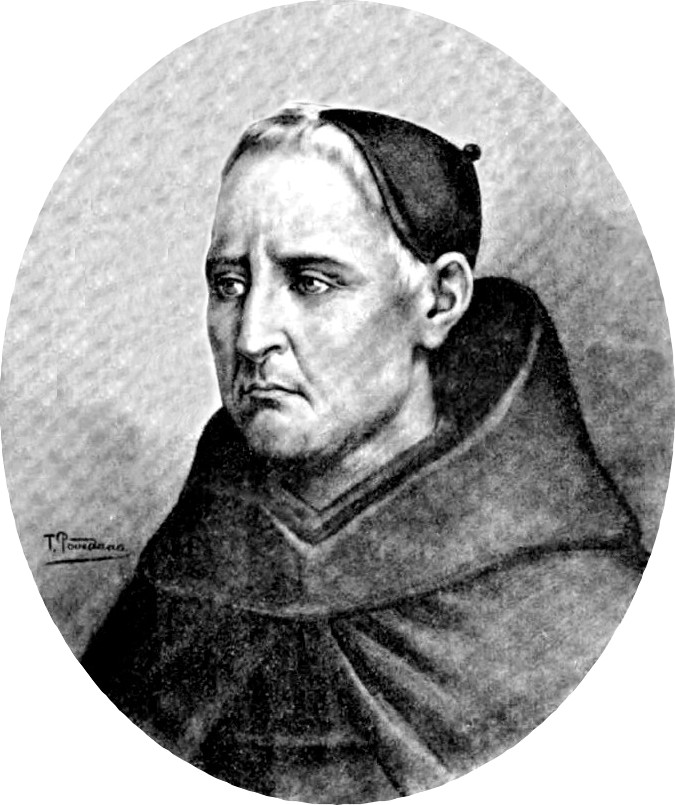
Antonio Liendo y Goicoechea, a Franciscan friar, reformed education at the university. He was a professor of most of the eventual leaders of the Central American independence.

In 1660 the printer es:José de Pineda Ibarra arrived at Santiago de los Caballeros. Among all his works he introduced university graduation cards, where it was written what the final exam was going to be about, date and time for the exam, and the names of the university authorities and student sponsors.

On 11 July 1717, thirty years after its papal sanction, the first medicine student graduated; his name was Vicente Ferrer González. The next physician to graduate was Pedro Palacios y Cóbar, who presented his final exam seventeen years later; and forty-seven years after that, the eminent Dr. José Felipe Flores graduated.

The Franciscan friar Juan Antonio Liendo y Goicoechea reformed university education towards the end of the 18th century by introducing science; Chemistry, Physics, Anatomy and Mathematics; and technology studies.

=== Second era: Science Academy ===
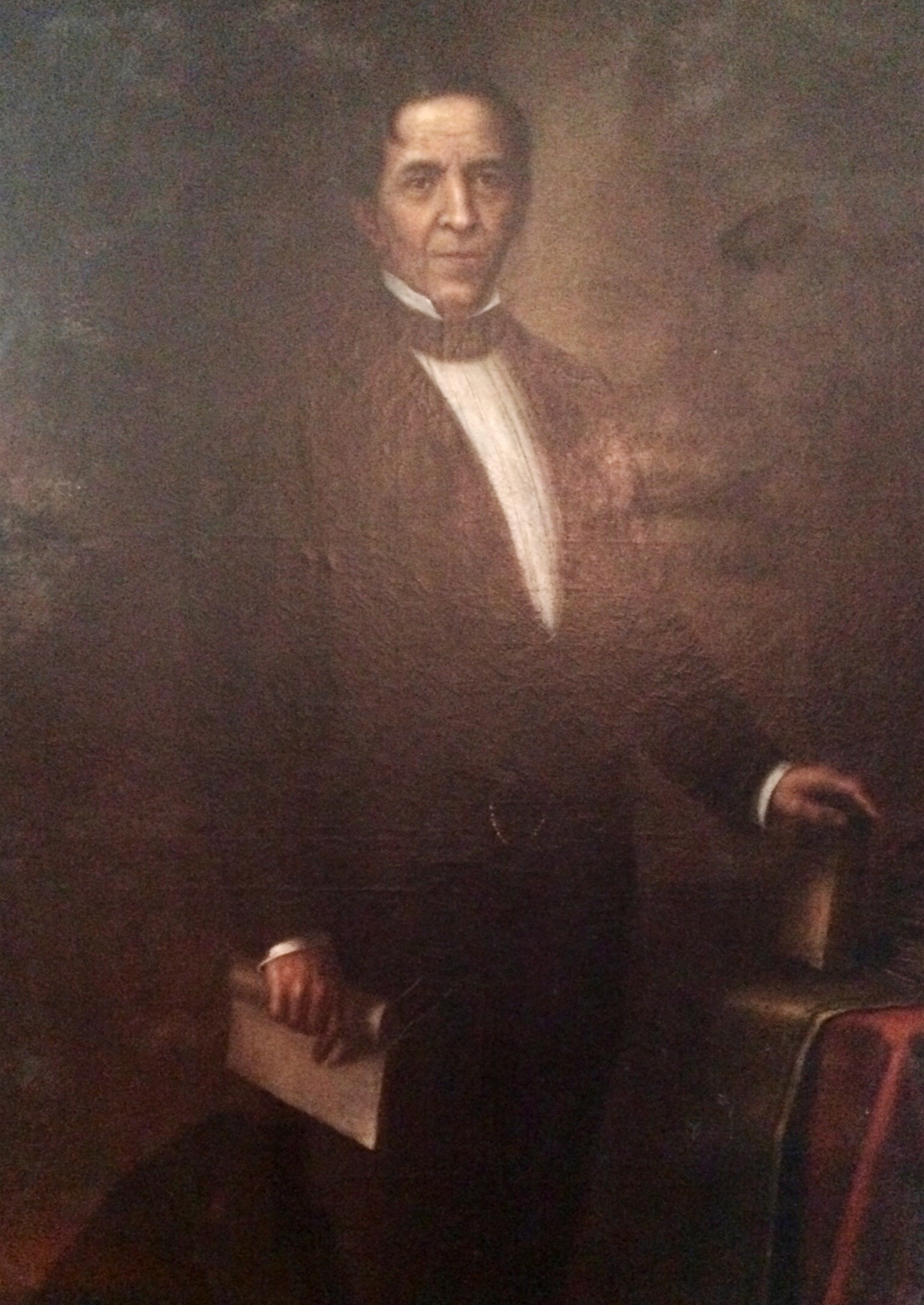
Doctor Mariano Gálvez during his gubernatorial term as Head of State of Guatemala. He founded the agnostic Science Academy in substitution of the religious University of San Carlos. He is buried in the museum of the university – formerly College of Law.

After Independence, the University of San Carlos lost its Royal status and became simply the "Pontifical University of San Carlos Borromeo" but it was in a precarious position: after the move from Santiago de los Caballeros it had to use a borrowed building to teach, and in 1821 its new one was not finished yet; besides, the political climate of the region was very unstable at the time. In 1825, Dr. Juan José de Aycinena y Piñol was elected as president of the university, and kept the religious curriculum that the institution had had for decades. However, in 1829, the conservative regime of his brother Mariano de Aycinena y Piñol was defeated by the liberal general Francisco Morazán, and the conservatives – mainly the Aycinena family – and the regular clergy were expelled from Central America and the university was suspended. In 1834, when doctor Mariano Gálvez was head of State of Guatemala, he found the Science Academy in the State, which took the position that the Pontifical University had previously occupied; the new university eliminated religious education altogether and implemented classes of Algebra, Geometry, Trigonometry and Physics; besides, the institution began to offer studies in engineering. The Academy of Science was open until 1840, because in that year the conservatives regained power in Guatemala under the strong leadership of General Rafael Carrera who reopened the old "Pontifical University of San Carlos Borromeo"; Dr. Aycinena was once again named as president of the university.

=== Third era: Pontifical University ===
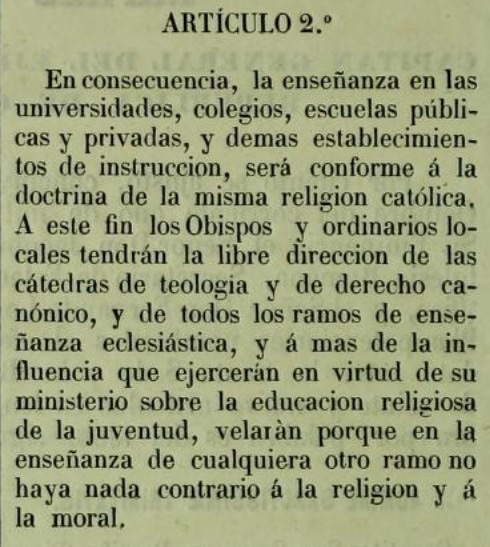
Article#2 of the Concordat of 1854 by which the Government of Guatemala entrusted the country's education to the Catholic Church

The power that the Catholic Church and the Aycinena family – to whom most of Carrera's advisors and secretaries belonged – had during the conservative regime in Guatemala was ratified the Concordat of 1854, in which Guatemala entrusted the education of its people to the regular clergy of the Catholic Church, committed itself to respect all church property -including haciendas, monasteries and sugar mills, authorized mandatory tithing and let the bishops censor all the country's publications; in return, Guatemala obtained indulgences for Army members, was allowed to keep all those properties that had been taken from the orders in 1829 – provided they were now in private hands, received a tax of the church income and had the right to prosecute any priest or bishop under Guatemalan law, if necessary. The concordat was designed by Juan José de Aycinena y Piñol, who was a cabinet member of the government – besides being the university president; then, it was first ratified by Secretary of the Interior, Justice and Ecclesiastical affairs Pedro de Aycinena and finally, approved by president Rafael Carrera, who in 1854 was appointed as Guatemala's president for life.

=== Fourth era: The university during the Liberal regimes ===
After the Liberal Revolution in 1871, the conservatives defeat resulted in a complete change of direction in the education in Guatemala: once again the regular clergy was expelled from the country, and all of their properties we confiscated. The education changed from completely religious to agnostic and kept like that until 1954.

The new Liberal regime founded the Polytechnic School -Military Academy- in 1873 to prepare military engineers, topographers and telegraphers, besides military officers. In July 1875, Justo Rufino Barrios closed the Pontifical University of San Carlos Borromeo and in its place founded the Central College of Law and the Central College of Medicine and Pharmacy which formed the National University of Guatemala. The government decreed that the teaching of Medicine had to be practical – as much as possible – and philosophical, with all the modern scientific theories. In 1877, the government found the Western College of Law in Quetzaltenango and in 1879 founded the National Library. Finally, in 1879 president Barrios founded the Colleges of Engineering, Philosophy and Literature. (Note: The college of Literature curriculum included Psychology and Logic, ethics and Philosophy history, Latin language and literature, Spanish grammar and literature and Latin American, British and German literature.)

President general Manuel Lisandro Barillas Bercián (1885–1892) founded the Western College of Medicine in Quetzaltenango and granted scholarship to the best students to continue their education abroad, both from Guatemala and Quetzaltenango.

On 21 March 1893, during the government of general José María Reina Barrios, decree #193 of the National Assembly established that all the board of directors members, deans and faculty of the National University colleges would be appointed by the President of Guatemala; thus the colleges lost the autonomy to select their own authorities.

In 1897, after the failure of the Exposición Centroamericana and the deep economic crisis that ensued, Reina Barrios implemented austerity measures that included closing the schools and university colleges. At the end of that year, Salvador Mendieta came back to Guatemala to attend the university, but due to the political stability of the times after the revolts against Reina Barrios both in the Eastern and Western regions of the country once it was known that Reina Barrios had extended his presidential term, and the closing of the university, decided to move to Mexico in early 1898. However, after the assassination of president Reina Barrios on 8 February, the Guatemalan government reopened the educational institutions, claiming that they were the basis for all the Liberal institutions; Mendieta, then, registered to begin that semester in the College of Law of the National University.

==== Estrada Cabrera presidency ====
At that moment, the new association started the student body reaction against the feudalist Centralamerica that prepared its students for political servility.

— Salvador Mendieta
About "El Derecho" student association
1899

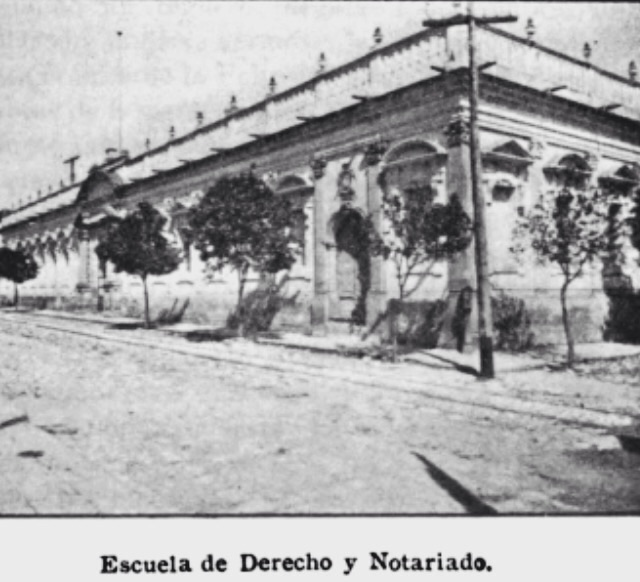
College of Law in 1897.

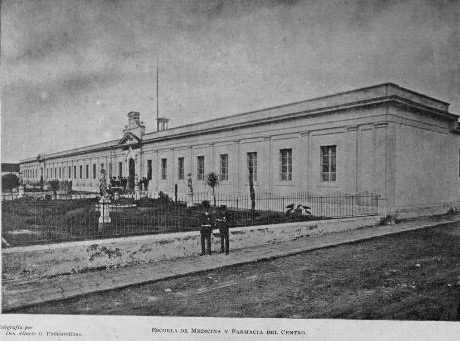
College of Medicine and Pharmacy in 1897.

Nicaraguan citizen Salvador Mendieta, who had already been expelled once from the Central National Institute for Boys by the former president José María Reyna Barrios for attempting to form a student association aimed at criticizing the school principal, founded on 18 June 1899 along with other fellow students "El Derecho" student association. The new association had members from the colleges of Law, Engineering and Medicine and an ideology identified with the Central American union. The new society became public on 15 September 1899 when the Guatemala City mayor invited some of its members to ceremonies for the Independence of Central America celebration that took place in the College of Law.

This society had several humanistic and social goals:

- gather all the Central American students around the idea of the region unity
- tighten social relationships and encourage intellectual sharing
- promote the formation of similar societies all across Central America
- organize the fight between those who think and those who oppress.

Due to the strong accusations against his presidency, Estrada Cabrera closed "El Derecho" after only a year of its life, and they had Mendieta sent to prison after which he sent the Nicaraguan into exile for promoting rebellion against his government.

In April 1899, the National Assembly submitted Estrada Cabrera a decree declaring the autonomy of the university colleges to elect their own authorities; the president vetoed the decree indicating that "the colleges could not be autonomous given that they were dependent on the State in all senses [...]" Therefore, the different colleges remain as dependencies of the Secretary of Public Education, which submitted a yearly review of their status, and also recommended the president whom to choose as dean and faculty members. Also, by a decree published on 16 June 1900, Estrada Cabrera militarized all the male student centers, including the university colleges, who received military instruction for the six first months of their careers.

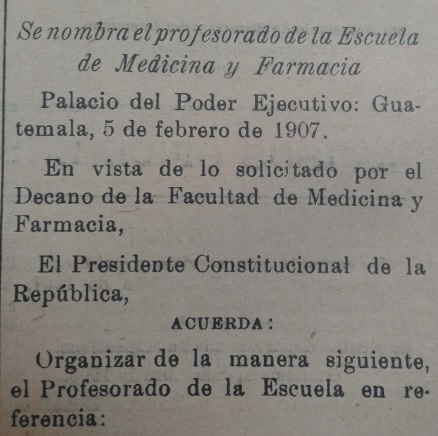
Facsimile of a decree published in El Guatemalteco, official newspaper of Guatemala in 1907, showing that President of Guatemala appointed the National University faculty members.

By 1907, the colleges were:

- College of Law (seventy students)
- College of Medicine and Pharmacy (150 students)
- Dentistry institute (5 students)
- School of midwives (10 students)
- School of Engineering (15 students)

Note that in 1907, the school of Engineering was part of the National University. This school, due to budget reasons, was alternatively part of the National University and the military academy; finally in 1908, the school was left as part of the university for good, after president Estrada Cabrera closed the academy following a failed assassination attempt that the cadets had plotted against him.

In 1918, the servility towards the presidents was at its peak and the university was renamed "University of Guatemala, Estrada Cabrera", by decree of the National Assembly on 2 May 1918. Francisco Galvez Portocarrero, close friend of the president, lobbied heavily for the new university given that in a recent trip to Perú], Argentina and Chile, he liked the model the universities followed in those South American countries. Upon returning to Guatemala, Galvez – who was also a National Assembly representative- brought along a complete library about universities and convinced both the president and the Assembly members to create the "University of Guatemala".

==== Carlos Herrera presidency (1920–1921) ====
University "Estrada Cabrera", was closed after the falling of the former president. However, one of the first decrees of the new president Carlos Herrera y Luna -appointed president by the National Assembly on 8 April- was to appoint new authorities and faculty for the National University, which now had the following academic departments:

- College of Natural Science and Pharmacy
- College of Law
- College of Medicine
- College of engineering

Herrera y Luna, as a token of appreciation of all the efforts of the university students during the last days of Estrada Cabrera regime, gave the different colleges their autonomy to elected their own authorities, although it did not grant them full autonomy. At this time the Student Body Association was founded and included Miguel Ángel Asturias, among a series of other Guatemalan intellectuals, and the second era of "El Derecho" Law student association, which had been closed by Estrada Cabrera in 1899.

=== Fifth era: the university after the 1944 Revolution ===
After the revolution against general Ubico's successor, general Federico Ponce Vaides, on 20 October 1944, the new government granted its complete autonomy to the university; Decree #12 on 11 November 1944 granted autonomy and renamed the institution as "Universidad de San Carlos de Guatemala" ("University of San Carlos of Guatemala"). The university's new role was to be director of college education in Guatemala, and to cooperated in study and solution of the critical problems that Guatemala faced at the time.

New colleges were created that time:

- College of Human Studies: created by then president Dr. Juan José Arévalo on 17 September 1945. Among its founder were Dr. Eduardo García Máynez -professor emeritus of the National Autonomous University of Mexico- as honorary faculty. The college studied: Philosophy, History, Literature, Psychology and Pedagogy.
- College of Agriculture
- College of Architecture
- College of Economics

Likewise, access was granted to both women and to all the society members that had been excluded from the institution in the past.

==== After 1954 coup d'état ====
Following its constitutional mandate, the university became involved in the political life of the country, presenting concrete social, economic and political proposals. However, with the beginning of the Cold War between the United States and the Soviet Union -major super powers that split world dominance after their victory in World War II, the 1954 Guatemalan coup d'état, the Cuban Revolution in 1959 and the influx of students from all over the social spectrum in Guatemala, Marxism became radical in the university. Besides, then archbishop of Guatemala Mariano Rossell y Arellano found out that it was urgent to recover some of the former influence Catholic Church used to have, and that it lost during the liberal regime of Justo Rufino Barrios in 1872, and therefore decided to work with the United Fruit Company to get rid of the Revolutionary governments whom he accused of atheist and communist. On 4 April 1954, Rossell y Arellano issued an open letter in which he denounced Communism advances in the country, and begged Guatemalans to rise in arms and fight against the common enemy of God and the Land. His letter has published all over Guatemala, and even though he kept claiming that the Catholic Church was not seeking privileges in its anticommunist quest, Rossel y Arellano was able that after the 1954 coup, new president colonel Carlos Castillo Armas included the following back in the new Constitution of Guatemala, for the first time since 1872:

- that the Catholic Church had the right to own real estate and other properties
- that religious education was declared of public interest
- that the State supported religious education
- that there were independent private universities not connected with University of San Carlos.

This way, the Catholic Church recover some of the former power it held before 1871, when the Liberal Reform confiscated its properties and cancelled its privileges, in a direct attack against it as the main conservative party member of the time.

==== Nottebohm case and the Dean of the College of Law ====
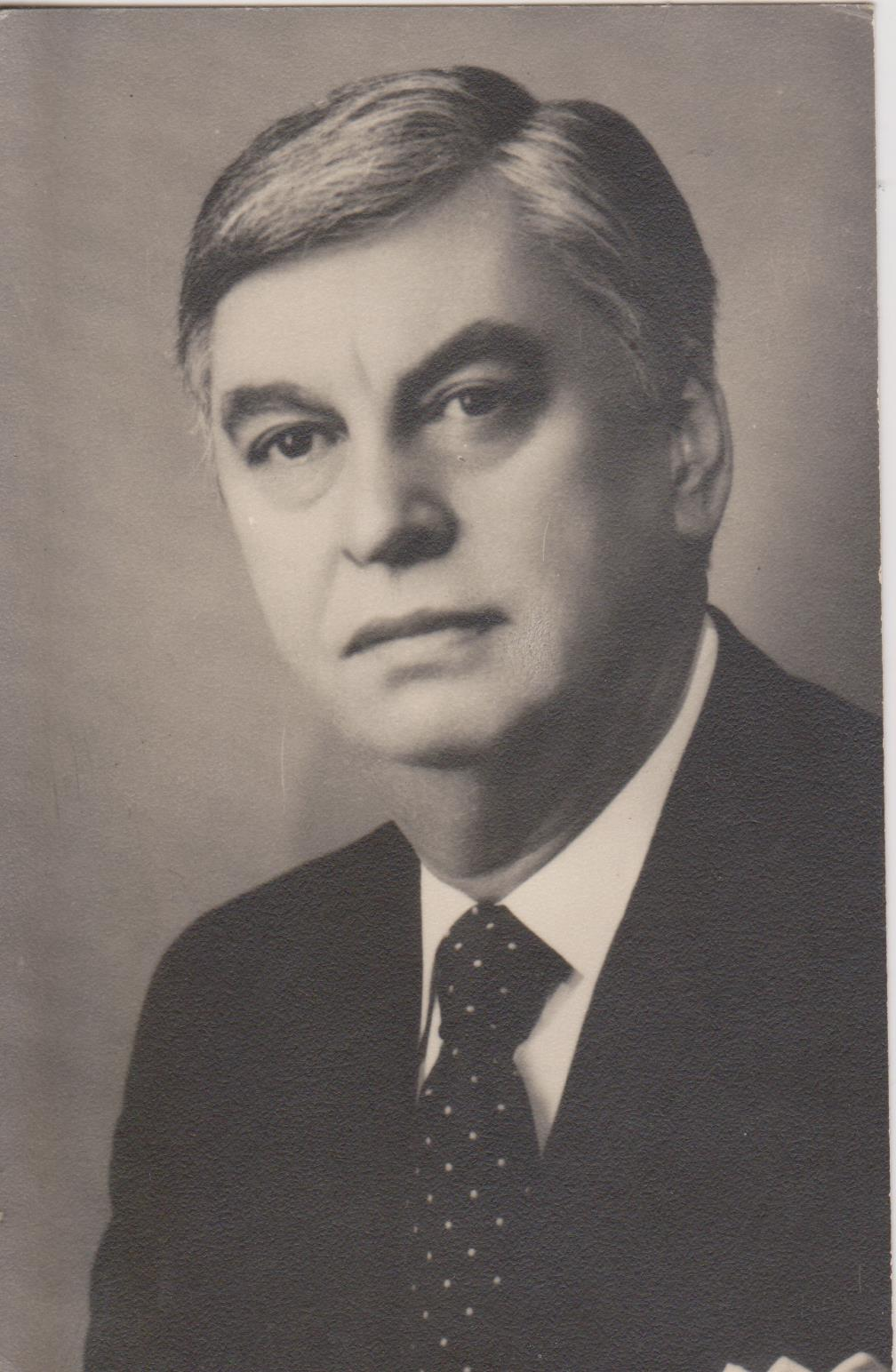
Doctor in Law Adolfo Molina Orantes, College of Law Dean and legal advisor of the Guatemalan delegates for the Nottebohm case before the International Court of Justice.

Between 1951 and 1955, College of Law dean, Dr. Adolfo Molina Orantes, worked as a legal advisor for the Guatemalan delegation before the International Court of Justice of The Hague for the Nottebohm case (Liechtenstein v. Guatemala) [1955]. The case about Mr. Nottebohm, who was born 16 September 16, 1881, in Hamburg, Germany and possessed German citizenship although he lived in Guatemala from 1905 until 1943 because he never became a citizen of Guatemala. On October 9, 1939, Nottebohm applied to become a naturalized citizen of Liechtenstein. The application was approved and he became a citizen of that country. He then returned to Guatemala on his Liechtenstein passport and informed the local government of his change of nationality. When he tried to return to Guatemala once again in 1943 he was refused entry as an enemy alien since the Guatemalan authorities did not recognize his naturalization and regarded him as still German. It has been suggested that the timing of the event was due to the recent entry of the United States and Guatemala into the Second World War. He was later extradited to the United States, where he was held at an internment camp until the end of the war. All his possessions in Guatemala were confiscated. After his release, he lived out the rest of his life in Liechtenstein.

The Government of Liechtenstein granted Nottebohm protection against unjust treatment by the government of Guatemala and petitioned the International Court of Justice. However, the government of Guatemala argued that Nottebohm did not gain Liechtenstein citizenship for the purposes of international law. The court agreed and thus stopped the case from continuing.

The Nottebohm case was subsequently cited in many definitions of nationality. and Dr. Molina Orantes was recognized as an expert in international Law and named permanent consultant of the International Court.

==== Private universities ====
As a result of the political climate changes after the coup of 1954, the society elites decided to create their own private universities, (Note: Universidad Rafael Landívar in 1961, Universidad del Valle de Guatemala in 1966, Universidad Francisco Marroquín in 1971, and so on.) which would have very different ideologies from the ones presented in the University of San Carlos. Basically the new institutions would have capitalist and liberal ideologies while the national university chose Marxism. After heavy lobbying, in 1965 the new ISR tax law exonerated potential private universities from any kind of taxation and state contributions, and in 1966 the Law of Private Universities was approved.

==== Research on Guatemalan history ====
In 1957 the Marxist historian es:Severo Martínez Peláez returned to Guatemala after his exile and joined the university as a faculty member. The College of Economics dean, Rafael Piedrasanta Arandi, and the university president, Edmundo Vásquez Martínez, approved a scholarship for Martinez Pelaez to research the Archivo General de Indias in Sevilla, Spain between 1967 and 1969. From this research comes his main work, La patria del criollo, published in 1970, as well as the program of Economic History of Central America of the College of Economics and the total reform of the School of History in 1978.

In 1979, due to death threats from the general Fernando Romeo Lucas García regime, Martínez Peláez had to go into exile once again with his family and continued with his research and teaching activities in the Benemérita Universidad Autónoma de Puebla in Mexico, where he was an invited speaker in several seminars and created new curricula for the College of History. Besides, he had important meetings with historians and Guatemalan exiles in Mexico.

==== Veterinary medicine ====
The College of Veterinary was created on 27 September 1957, and initially was part of the College of Medicine and was located in the old Medicine Building in Guatemala City Historical Downtown. In 1958 and 1959 it moved into private homes that the university rented in zones 9 and 4 of Guatemala City; it also used the university's Botanic Garden library in zone 4. By 1960, the College of Veterinary moved into its definite home in the main University campus.

On 11 January 1969 the School of Animal Studies, which was independent of the School of Veterinary medicine. and on 27 September 1974 it moved into the new modular buildings on the southwest section of the main campus, next to the Veterinary Medicine Hospital.

=== Repression and decline ===
During general Miguel Ydígoras Fuentes presidency, the university started suffering repression due to its position alongside the main labor unions, with three students murdered in front of the College of Law in 1962.

==== The EXMIBAL Case ====
During the government of Julio César Méndez Montenegro the possibility of giving the nickel mines in Izabal in concession to a Canadian mining company was brought to the table, but it did not materialized. As soon as the general Carlos Arana Osorio took office on 1 July 1970, he reopened the case and began working in for EXMIBAL to get a concession. However, many social sectors opposed to it, arguing that it would be too costly for the country. One of the main opponents was the commission that the University of San Carlos created to discuss the matter; among the members of the commission was the lawyer Oscar Adolfo Mijangos López, then representative in the Congress, the respected Guatemalan intellectual Alfonso Bauer Paiz -who had been part of the staff of presidents Juan José Arévalo Bermejo and Jacobo Arbenz Guzman, and Julio Carney Herrera Both Camey Herrera and Bauer Paiz were shot in November 1970: Carney died of his wounds while Bauer Paz, severely wounded, had to go into exile.

The commission members had strongly opposed the conditions proposed by the Government to grant the concession EXMIBAL; after the attack against Bauer Paiz and Carney, on 13 February 1971 Mijangos López was assassinated by unknown assailants as he left his office long the 4th Avenue in Zone 1 of the Guatemala City. Mijangos Lopez had been under the fatal impression that the government was not going to assassinate him because he was on a wheelchair since 1958.

On 8 May 1971, Arana Osorio's administration finally granted the concession to EXMIBAL; it covered 385 square kilometers in the area of El Estor, with and initial investment of US$228 million. The mine, built in the mountains of indigenous maya Q'eqchi people, included a residential complex of 700 homes, numerous offices, a hospital, a small shopping center, school, a golf course and a large area for industrial processing.

==== Laugerud and Lucas García military governments ====
During the military governments of the seventies, the tension between the government and the university kept growing, until it reached its peak in 1978 during the massive demonstration that occurred to protest rising urban public transportation costs. The Association of University Students (AEU) had a leading role in the protests, but this brought persecution of their leaders and the murder of the secretary general of the association Oliverio Castañeda de León, on 20 October of that year. Just fifteen days after the murder of Castañeda de León, was missing his successor, Antonio Ciani García, and over the next 18 months almost every student leader and university faculty with political connections were threatened (even with the legal parties). Whoever did not paid attention and continued with their protest activities, was simply killed or kidnapped.

In early 1979, the following attacks occurred against renowned members of the university:

- On 25 January 1979, Alberto Fuentes Mohr, Doctor of Economics, Congress representative, leader of the Social Democratic Party (PSD) and former minister of Finance and Foreign Affairs during the administration of Julio César Méndez Montenegro, was murdered.
- That same day, but a few hours later, was shot and killed the student and union leader Ricardo Martinez Solorzano.
- On 14 February, Manuel Lisandro Andrade Roca, general secretary of the university in the tenure of Saúl Osorio Paz as university president -and a student leader during the "Marches of 1962"- was killed.
- On 22 March, former Guatemala City mayor Manuel Colom Argueta was killed, in an operation in which his murderers allegedly used a helicopter to direct the operation Colom had been director of Center for Urban and Regional Studies (CEUR) of the University of San Carlos of Guatemala and a political leader of the United Revolutionary Front (FUR). Next to Fuentes Mohr, he was the most prominent members of the legal political opposition and their deaths ended, even more, the political space in Guatemala. These murders and threats against leaders of the FUR and the PSD continued in 1979 and 1980, and in subsequent years against the Guatemalan Christian Democracy party.

At the university, university president Saúl Osorio Paz, after attacks on his colleagues and death threats against him, began to live in presidency, protected by student brigades of the communist FRENTE student party. In an unprecedented case, the president directed the university from underground for almost two years.

The effect of state repression was worse on the student movement: the AEU ended decimated. Despite all this, the association continued to be a belligerent organization during this campaign of terror. To protect themselves, the AEU restructured its organizational form such that their leaders were not so vulnerable, and declined to reveal their names.

In January 1979, a new freshmen generation arrived to the university. Many of them had been members of the CEEM or student associations in the public institutes and had participated in the events of October 1978. It was them who took the leadership of the AEU. But it was much more difficult to replace the fallen or exiled faculty, which resulted in a marked decline in the academic quality of the institution. Later, laws that severely restricted the university autonomy were proposed, and violating the constitutional mandate to give 5% of the national budget to the institution became commonplace for the government.

==== Burning the Spanish Embassy in Guatemala ====
On 31 January 1980, several students from the University of San Carlos advised a k'iche' peasant group who wanted to let the world know about their precarious situation; when the country's newspapers did not dare to publish their demands, and after all legal avenues to be heard had been exhausted, the group decided to take the premises of the Embassy of Spain and use it as a platform for their demands. (Note: Ambassador Máximo Cajal López had visited the k'iche' farmer communities a few months before, and had gathered information for a report on them, which was never published, but the draft of which still exists.) The reaction of the government of general Fernando Romeo Lucas García was strong and direct: police surrounded the premises of the embassy and after several hours of siege, the situation ended with the burning of the room where all the people who were inside the embassy had taken refuge, including almost the entire Embassy staff and some random visitors, including former vice president of Guatemala, Eduardo Cáceres Lehnhoff and former Foreign Affairs Minister, Adolfo Molina Orantes. The only two survivors were Ambassador Máximo Cajal López and peasant Gregorio Yuja Xona, who were taken to the Private Hospital Herrera Llerandi. Yuja was kidnapped there and a group tried to kidnap the ambassador, but he was taken from the hospital just in time by the ambassador of Costa Rica in Guatemala; Cajal left the country that night. Yuja, meanwhile, was tortured and his body thrown off the premises of the president mansion at the University of San Carlos. His body was buried in the Heroes and Martyrs Plaza on Central Campus.

==== 1985 civil unrest: military invasion of Central Campus ====
During the government of general Óscar Humberto Mejía Victores, the Mutual Support Group (GAM) -led by Nineth Montenegro- was founded and the High School Student Coordination Group (CEEM) also gained considerable strength. The latter was formed by students from the Central National Institute for Boys, the Central Normal Institute for Young Ladies Belén and Rafael Aqueche (Note: By 1985, the economic elites had left Guatemala City downtown, along with these once premier schools which now were attended by the low middle and low income areas of the city.) which organized mass protests in September 1985 against the rising prices for public transportation. At least ten people died in Guatemala City in the most extensive wave of urban unrest since protests against the government of Fernando Romeo Lucas García in August 1978. The unrest began with demonstrations against rising prices public transportation but then became widespread due to the bad economic situation the country was in at the time. Burning of buses, blockades and massive protests that resulted in destruction of public infrastructure occurred almost every day. The government responded with three thousand Army soldiers, whom supported by light armored forces and the riot squad of the National Police, were deployed in central and peripheral areas of the city. Also, the night of 3 September 1985 the University of San Carlos of Guatemala was occupied by the military who allegedly found an underground shooting range subversive propaganda.

Several hundred people were arrested and General Mejia Víctores addressed the nation through a television and radio address in which he announced measures to address prevailing social unrest. General Mejia announced public schools closure until further notice and the freezing of prices of consumer goods; in the end, as part of the process solution a high school student bonus was granted to both elementary and high schools so they could be transported free in public transportation, plus all the public school students were promoted by decree. Students who graduated by decree in 1985 were received with brutal initiations by the different student bodies through the university.

==== Constitution of 1985: Election of judges and university representatives before government institutions ====
Article 215. Election of the Supreme Court
.

The judges of the Supreme Court shall be elected by Congress for a period of five years, from a list of twenty-six candidates proposed by a nominating committee consisting of a representative of the Presidents of the Universities of the country, who presides, the Deans of the Colleges of Law, an equal number of representatives elected by the General Assembly of the Association of Lawyers and Notaries of Guatemala and by an equal number of representatives elected by the judges holders the Court of Appeal and other courts that Article 217 of the Constitution refers to.

Article 269. Integration of the Constitutionality Court.

The Constitutionality Court consists of five titular judges, each of whom has a substitute. When dealing with cases of unconstitutionality against the Supreme Court, the Congress, the President or the Vice President, the number of members can be increased to seven, choosing the two other judges from among the alternates. The judges shall hold office for five years and shall be appointed as follows:

- One by the Supreme Court;
- One by Congress;
- One by the President in Council of Ministers;
- A judge appointed by the Higher University Council of the University of San Carlos of Guatemala; and
- A judge appointed by the Assembly of the Bar.

Simultaneously with the appointment of the holder, the respective alternate will be appointed by Congress.

— Constitution of the Republic of Guatemala, 1985.

After the murder or forced exile of most of its faculty, the stability of the College of Law after the Guatemalan Civil War was recovered with deanship of Cipriano Soto Tobar, who took office in 1988. Soto Tobar took a significant effort on hiring faculty. However, his main goal was to establish political networks to favor political lobbies exploiting the new role that the Constitution assigned to the University of San Carlos: which, enacted in 1985, entrusted the College of Law and the University of San Carlos with the task of naming representatives to the process of election of judges of the highest courts of the land, as well as the Comptroller General of Accounts, and the Chief Public Prosecutor Also, the university was given the power to send a judge to the Constitutionality Court.

These networks took hold and strengthened through the 1990s, with relationships set up between institutions and societal sectors beyond the university. After leaving the deanship, the University Council nominated Soto to the Constitutionality Court, although there were persistent rumors that he was selling diplomas and certificates. However, his application was accepted because his involvement in these felonies could not be proved because no credible evidence was presented. Two of his performances in the Constitutionality Court showed possible political compromise: first, he voted to validate an illegal adoption network and, then he voted in favor of the registration as a presidential candidate of general Efraín Ríos Montt, despite the prohibition of the 1985 Constitution, which does not allowed as a candidate anybody that had been part of a coup d'état. In those years, adoption networks operating in Guatemala could collect up to US$60,000 per child and went from delivering 1200 children in 1997 to more than four thousand in 2004.

Estuardo Galvez, who took that dean office in 2000 and later went on to become university president, was one of the members of the networks established by Soto; realizing the importance of the Bar Association, which was also a participant in the election of judges -and until then controlled by lawyers linked to the traditional capital of the country- Galvez sought from the beginning of his term to favor his post graduate students placing them in public institutions so that they could show their loyalty with favorable votes in the Bar elections. After several elections, and once Galvez was no longer dean, the network that Soto set up beat the traditional capital lawyers in the Bar Association elections by 300 votes; as recorded in the minutes, the majority of his votes were young lawyers -his former students.

==== Student leaders murders in 1989 ====
In 1987, the president of the Student Association "El Derecho" (AED), Willy Ligorría, was expelled from the Association of University Students (AEU) for embezzling funds from the Huelga de Dolores Committee, for his direct involvement in an embezzlement money of the association and usurpation of functions and for signing as acting as general secretary in various activities and international documents. After his departure, a series of death threats against members of the board of the AEU began: in 1989 there was a steady escalation of threats, some of them signed by death squads as "the Dolorosa", the "Jaguar of Justice" or "Secret Anticommunist-Army". Despite his expulsion, Ligorría, maintained a very high and combative profile, while his close friend, Marco Tulio Montenegro, was still part of AEU.

In 1989, several student body leaders returned to Guatemala from exile intending to achieve a resurgence of student coordination, which was practically dismantled since the seventies. But on August 21, Iván Ernesto Gonzalez was arrested and kidnapped; the next day, Carlos Contreras Conde, leader of the University Student Movement (MEU), was abducted near the university. That same day Hugo Leonel Gramajo was abducted and introduced in a red pick-up with foreign plates. On 23 August, Victor Hugo Rodriguez Jaramillo and Silvia Azurdia Utrera founders of MEU, were kidnapped and taken violently amid two cars that blocked their way. And Mario De León left a press conference that the Student Body held that day at around 19:45 hours and was detained by the National Police and has not been seen again since. Finally, Aaron Ochoa disappeared the next day.

During an emergency meeting in which the response to the government offensive was being discussed, Willy Ligorría called to say that he knew where Hugo Gramajo and Aaron Ochoa were hidden and that he could bring the still free student leaders to them. In September other members of the student movement, Carlos Chutá Carney, Carlos Humberto Cabrera and Carlos Palencia were kidnapped and found dead shortly afterwards.

After the murders of the student leaders, Ligorría spoke at some rallies in college and participated in the demonstrations that took place. On Saturday September 15 at 14:15 hours he left for Panamá along with Marco Tulio Montenegro and Byron Milian Vicente. Montenegro returned to Guatemala on 11 November 1989 to rejoin the AEU, but he was already a suspect, and was killed with knife soon after. Meanwhile, Ligorría was appointed head of research of public prosecutions. (Note: According to research that was subsequently conducted, it was determined that Ligorría had strong ties with a "gang" of zone 18, whose members went armed at all times; College students suspected that the "maras" had been formed by the army. Ligorría was also affiliated with the Democratic Socialist Party (PSD) and even wasted money in their university activities, although he always maintained a revolutionary speech, was a member of ORPA and maintained contact with Danilo Rodriguez, chief of the FAR.) On September 12, 1997, the Guatemalan National Revolutionary Unity, which became a political party after the peace accords, formally accused Ligorría for his involvement in the murder of the student leader, claiming that he was a member of military intelligence.

== University presidents ==
=== "Real y Pontificia Universidad de San Carlos Borromeo" presidents ===
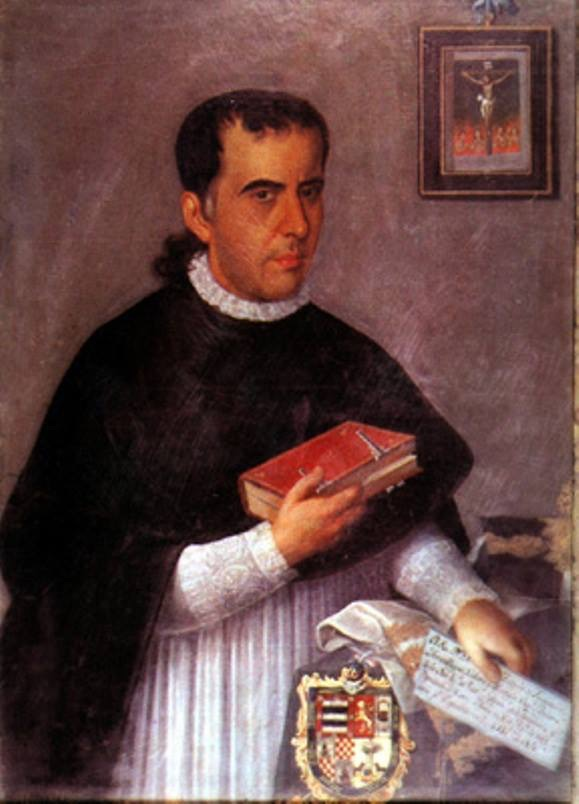
Antonio de Larrazábal y Arrivillaga, "Real y Pontificia Universidad de San Carlos Borromeo" president in 1813 and then from 1818 to 1825.

- Dr. José de Baños y Soto Mayor, arcediano de la Catedral, Predicador del Rey de España y Doctor de la Universidad de Osuna
- Antonio de Larrazábal y Arrivillaga(1813, 1820–1825) (Note: Chosen in 1813 as University President, but because he was one of the representative before the Cádiz Courts was made prisoner by José de Bustamante y Guerra and was not released until 1818.)
- Dr. Juan José de Aycinena y Piñol (1825–1829)

=== "Academia de Ciencias" presidents ===
- Dr. Pedro Molina Mazariegos (1836–1840).

=== "Pontificia Universidad de San Carlos Borromeo" Presidents ===
- Bishop Juan José de Aycinena y Piñol, (1840–1865)

=== National University presidents ===
- Dr. Agustín Gómez
- Dr. Carlos Federico Mora (1944)

=== University of San Carlos presidents ===
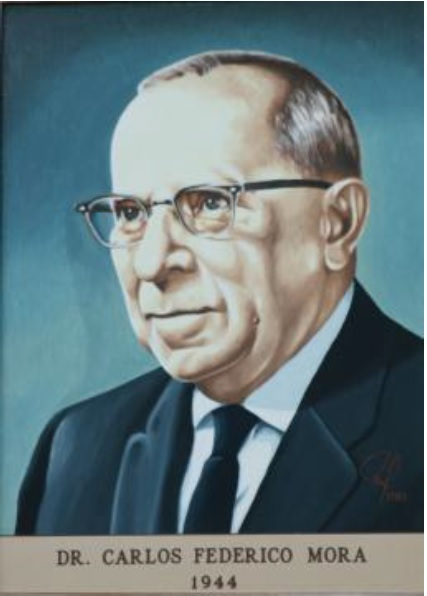
Dr. Carlos Federico Mora, last president of the National University and first president of University of San Carlos.

- Dr. Carlos Federico Mora (1944–1945)
- Dr. Carlos Martínez Durán
- Dr. Mario Dary Rivera
- Dr. Edmundo Vásquez Martínez (1966–1970)
- Rafael Cuevas
- Saúl Osorio Paz (-14 de julio 1980) (Note: Osorio Paz worked his last months from his exile in Costa Rica and Mexico due to the numerous death threats against him.)
- Roberto Molina Mejía (14 July 1980 – 31 July 1980)
- Dr. Eduardo Meyer Maldonado
- Roderico Segura
- Alfonso Fuentes Soria
- Jafeth Cabrera
- Efraín Medina
- Dr. Carlos Estuardo Gálvez Barrios
- Dr. Carlos Alvarado Cerezo
- Ing. Murphy Olimpo Paz Recinos
- Pablo Ernesto Oliva Soto
- Walter Mazariegos Biolis

== Colleges ==
University of San Carlos colleges are structured as follows:

=== Board of directors ===
Each college board of directors is structure with a dean, who runs it, a secretary and five trustees, of whom two are professor representatives, one is a representative of the professional association and two are student representatives.

=== Dean ===
The deans are the directors and representative of their colleges and work on four-year terms. To be reelected a dean needs 3/5 parts of the electors, a new dean needs half +1.

== Academic units ==
The university has 40 academic units:

- 10 colleges;
- 10 schools;
- 19 regional centers
- 1 Technical Institute

=== Colleges ===
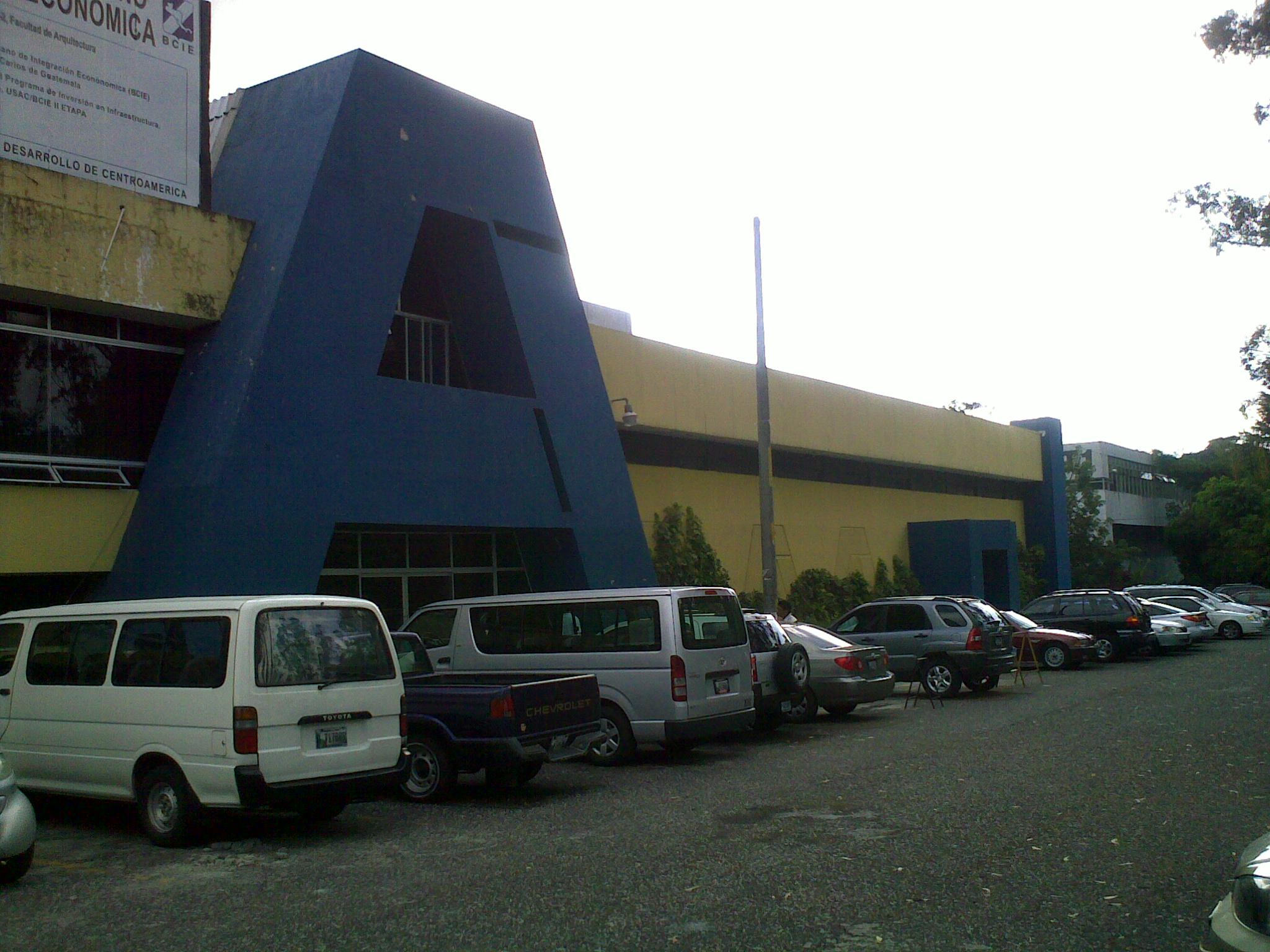
Architecture College Building

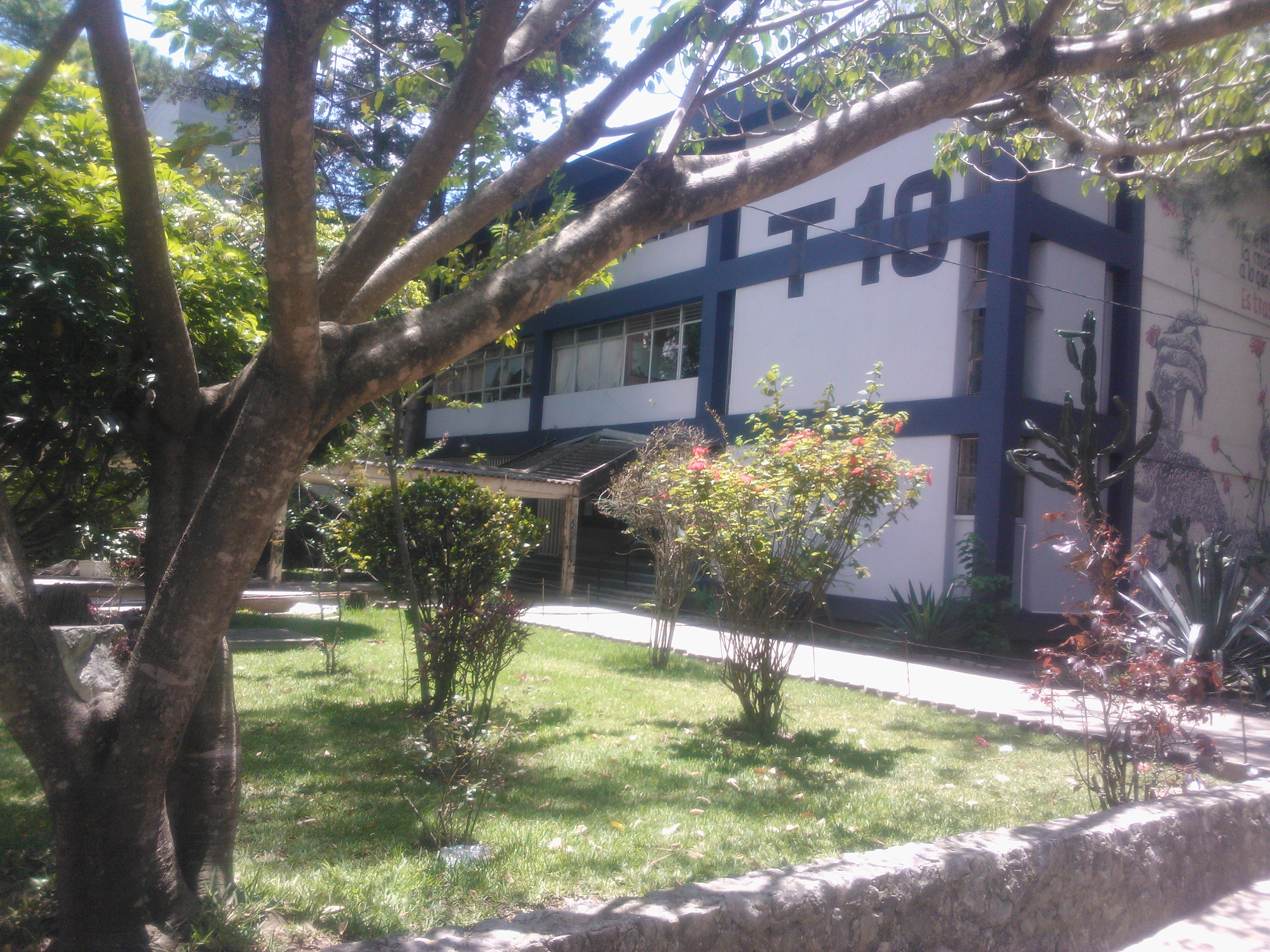
Pharmacy College Building

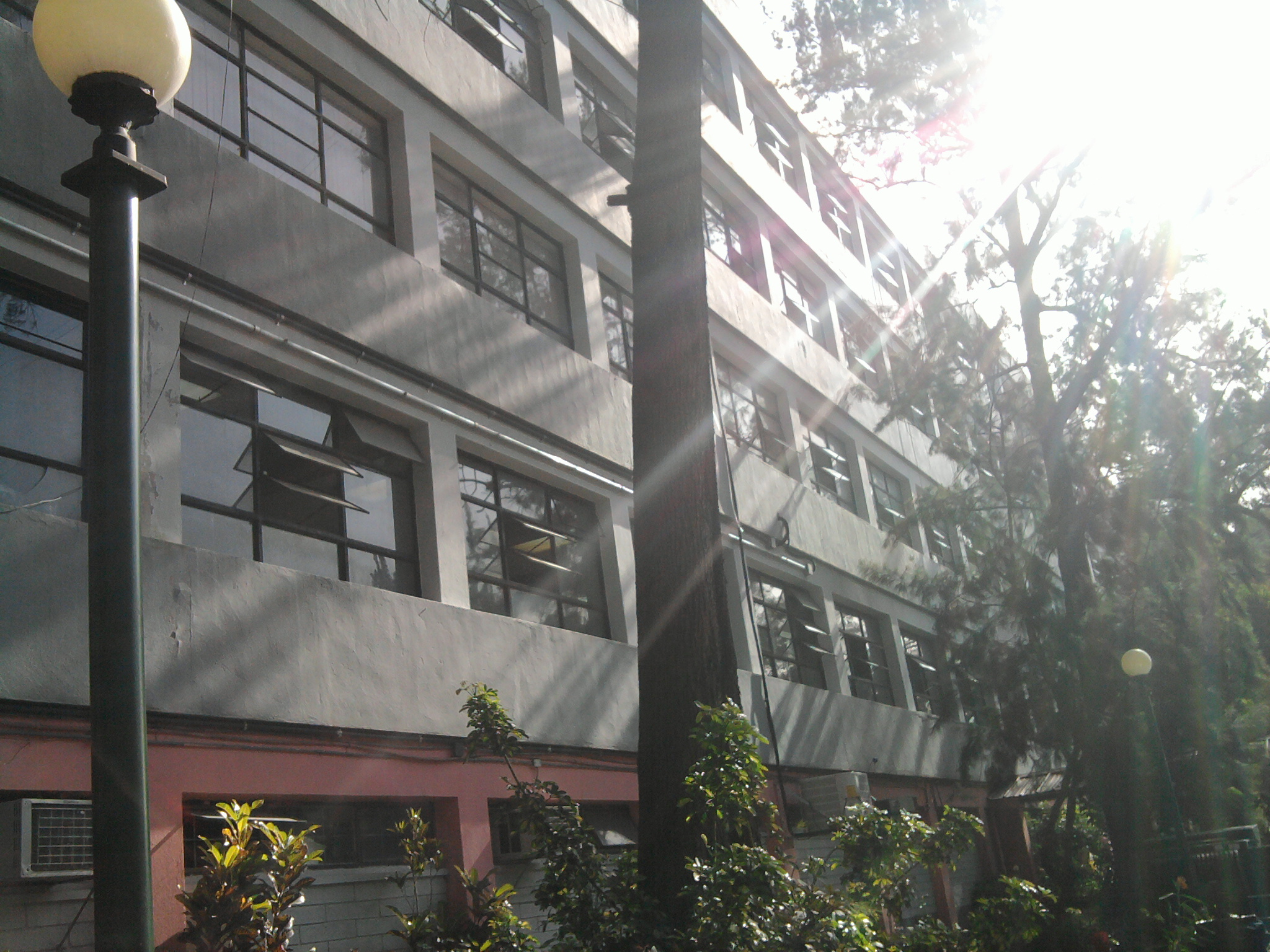
Engineering College Building

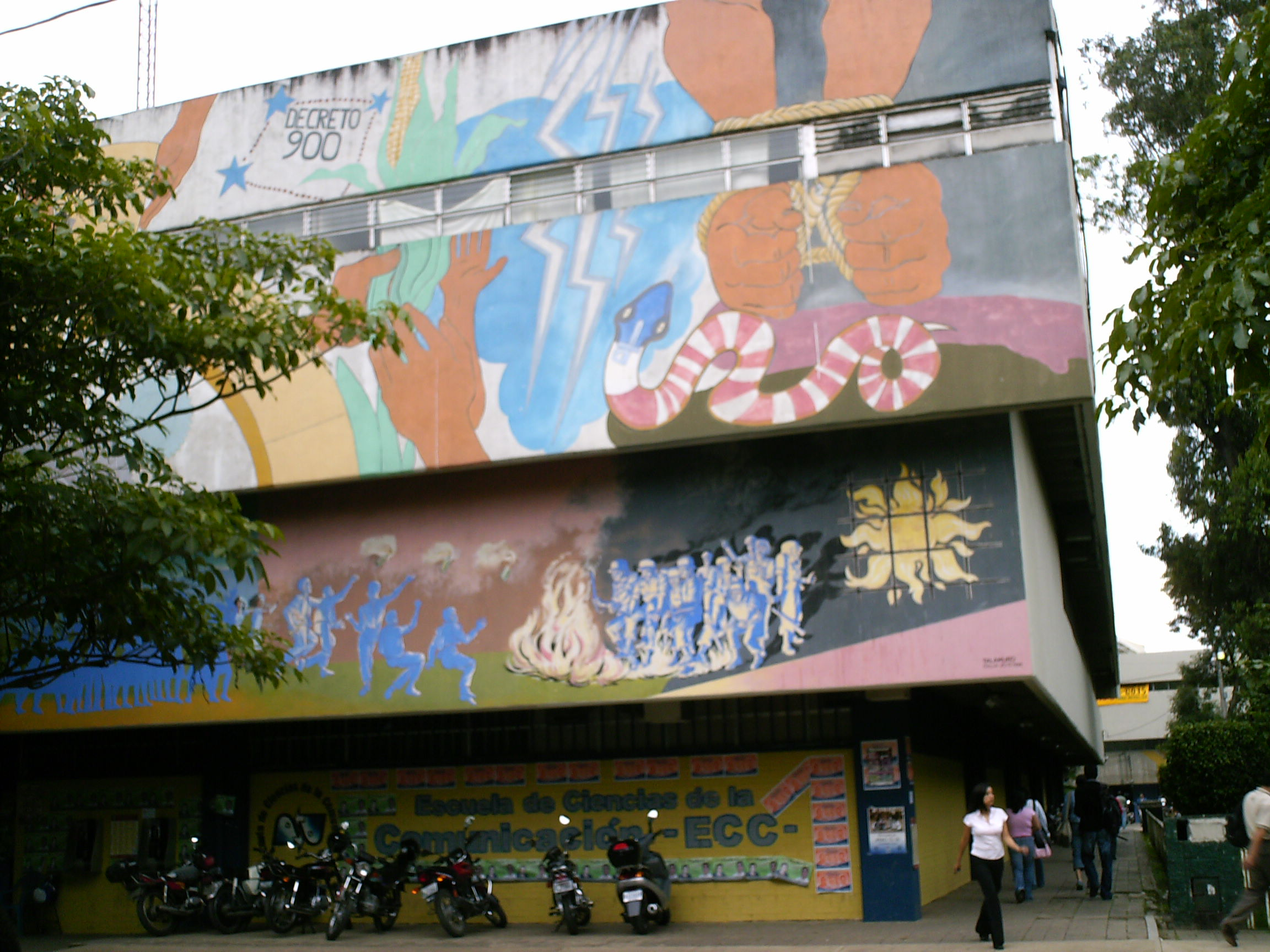
Communication Sciences School Building

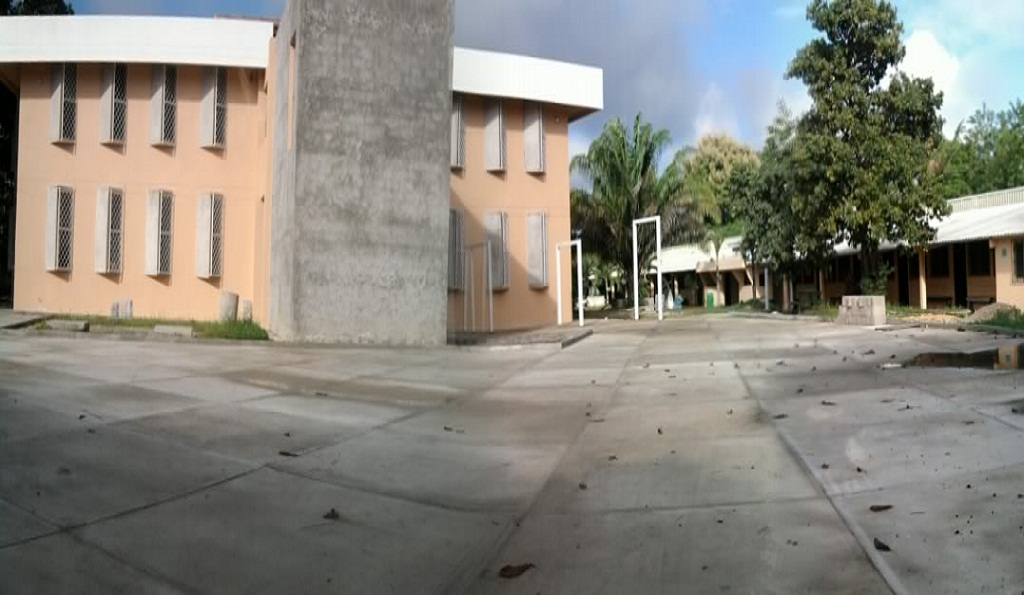
CUDEP Campus

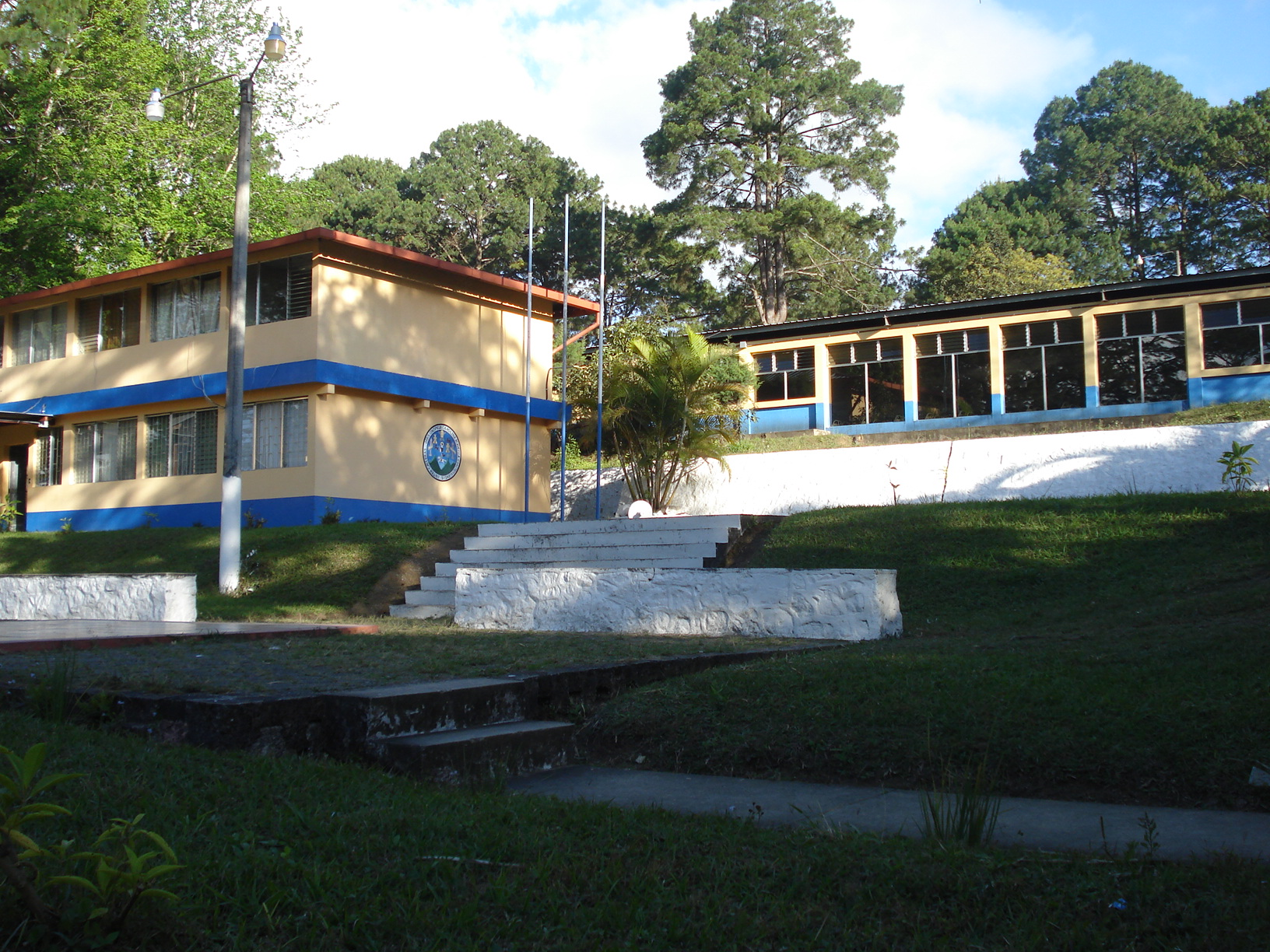
CUNOR Campus

#	Name	Acronym	Website
1	College of Agriculture	FAUSAC	fausac.edu.gt
2	College of Architecture	FARUSAC	farusac.edu.gt/
3	College of Economic Sciences	Economics	economicas.usac.edu.gt/
4	College of Law	Law	derecho.usac.edu.gt
5	College of Medicine	Medicine	medicina.usac.edu.gt
6	College of Pharmacy and Chemical Sciences	Pharmacy	portal.ccqqfar.usac.edu.gt
7	College of Humanities	FAHUSAC	humanidades.usac.edu.gt
8	College of Engineering	FIUSAC	ingeniería.usac.edu.gt
9	College of Dental Medicine	Dental College	fo.usac.edu.gt
10	College of Veterinary and Animal Studies	Veterinary	fmvz.usac.edu.gt

=== Schools ===
#	School	Acronym	Website
1	School of Psychology	Psychology	psicologia.usac.edu.gt
2	School of History	History	escuelahistoria.usac.edu.gt
3	School of Social Work	Social work	trabajosocial.usac.edu.gt
4	Communication Sciences School	ECC	comunicacion.usac.edu.gt
5	Political Sciences School	ECP	cienciapolitica.usac.edu.gt
6	High School Teacher School	EFPEM	efpem.usac.edu.gt
7	School of Physical Education	ECTAFIDE	ectafide.usac.edu.gt
8	Language Sciences School	ECL	
9	Superior School of Art	ESA	escuelasuperiordearte.usac.edu.gt
10	School of Physical and Mathematical Sciences	ECFM	ecfm.usac.edu.gt/

=== Regional Campuses ===
#	Regional Center	Acronym	Location
1	University Center of the West	CUNOC	Quetzaltenango, Quetzaltenango
2	Izabal Regional Campus	CUNIZAB	Puerto Barrios, Izabal
3	University Center of the East	CUNORI	Chiquimula, Chiquimula
4	Petén Regional Campus	CUDEP	Flores, Petén
5	University Center of the North	CUNOR	Cobán, Alta Verapaz
6	University Center of the Southeast	CUNSURORI	Jalapa, Jalapa
7	Santa Rosa Regional Campus	CUNSARO	Cuilapa, Santa Rosa
8	University Center of the Southwest	CUNSUROC	Mazatenango, Suchitepéquez
9	San Marcos Regional Campus	CUSAM	San Marcos, San Marcos
10	University Center of the Northwest	CUNOROC	La Democracia, Huehuetenango
11	University Center of the South	CUNSUR	Escuintla, Escuintla
12	Chimaltenango Regional Campus	CUNDECH	Chimaltenango, Chimaltenango
13	Jutiapa Regional Campus	JUSAC	Jutiapa Jutiapa
14	Quiche Regional Campus	CUQ	Santa Cruz del Quiché, Quiché
15	Baja Verapaz Regional Campus	CUNBAV	San Miguel Chicaj, Baja Verapaz
16	Totonicapán Regional Campus	CUNTOTO	Chuipachec, Totonicapán
17	Sololá Regional Campus	CUNSOL	Sololá, Sololá
18	Metropolitan Regional Campus	CUM	Guatemala City
19	Ocean Studies Center	CEMA	Guatemala City
20	Guatemala South Technological Institute	ITUGS	Palín, Escuintla

== Sports ==
The school's football club USAC of the Segunda División de Ascenso plays at Estadio Revolución located on campus grounds.

== Notable alumni ==
A list of notable faculty and alumni can be found in List of notable students and faculty of University of San Carlos of Guatemala.

== Gallery ==
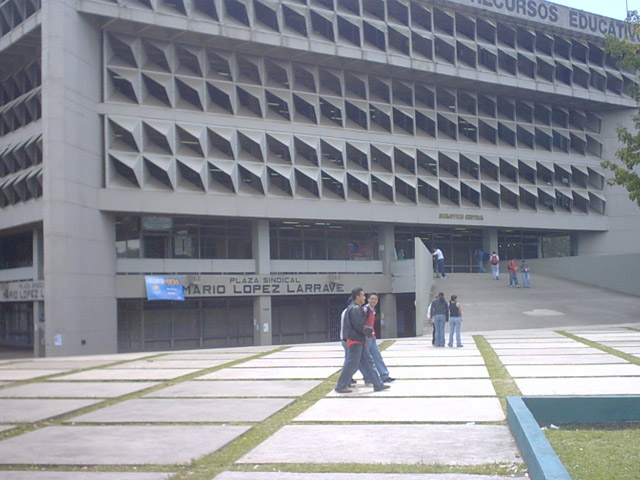

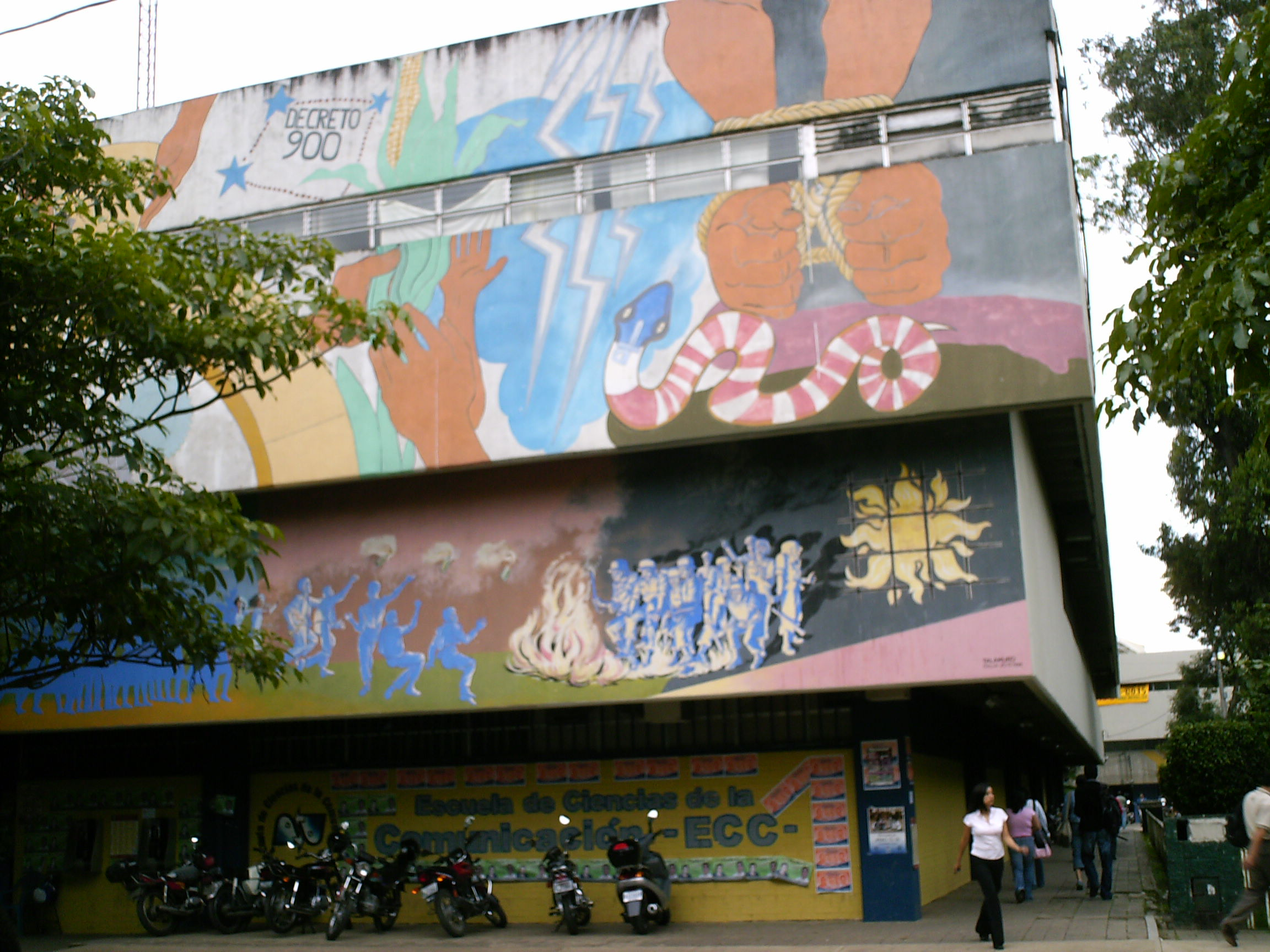

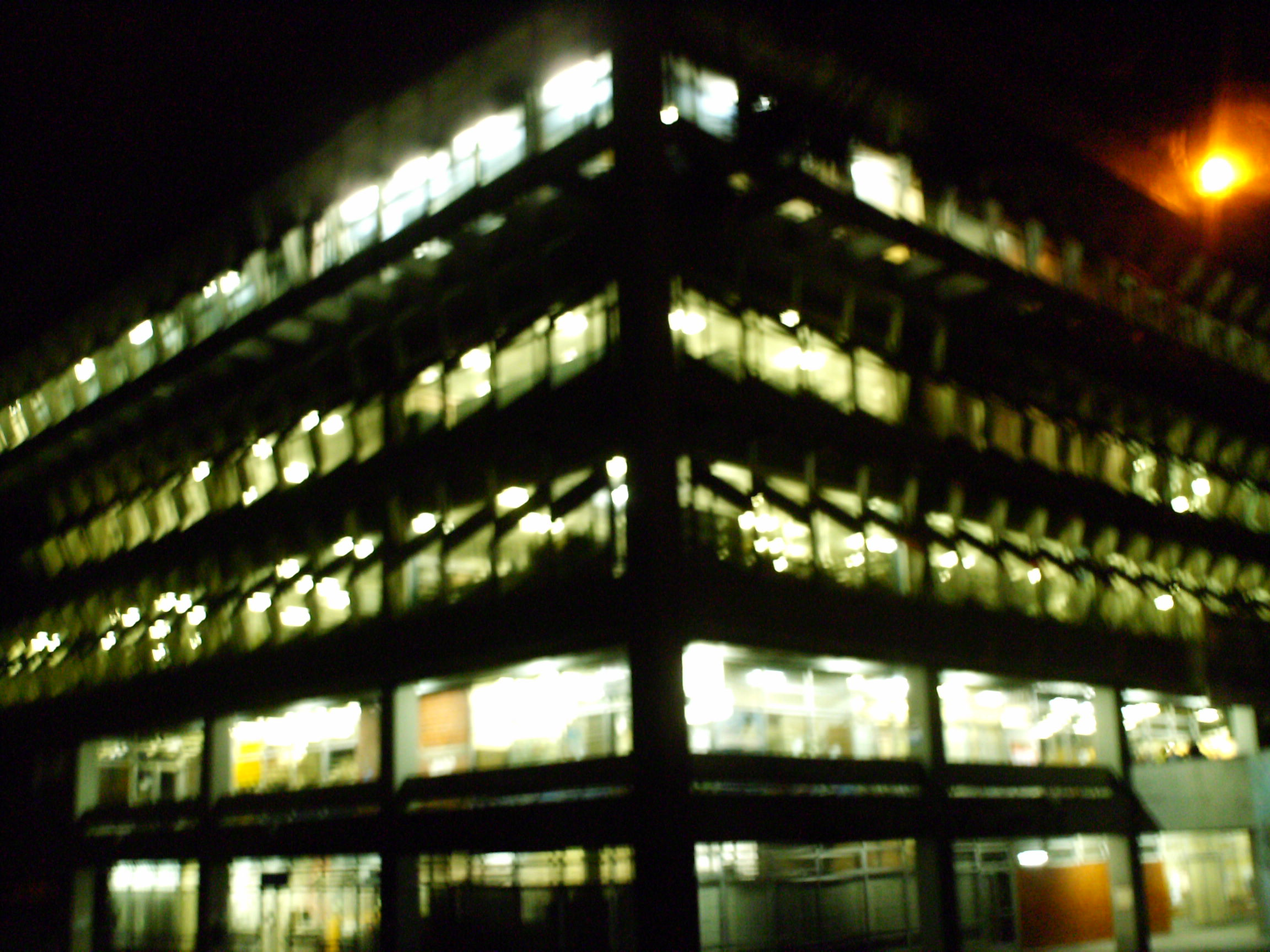

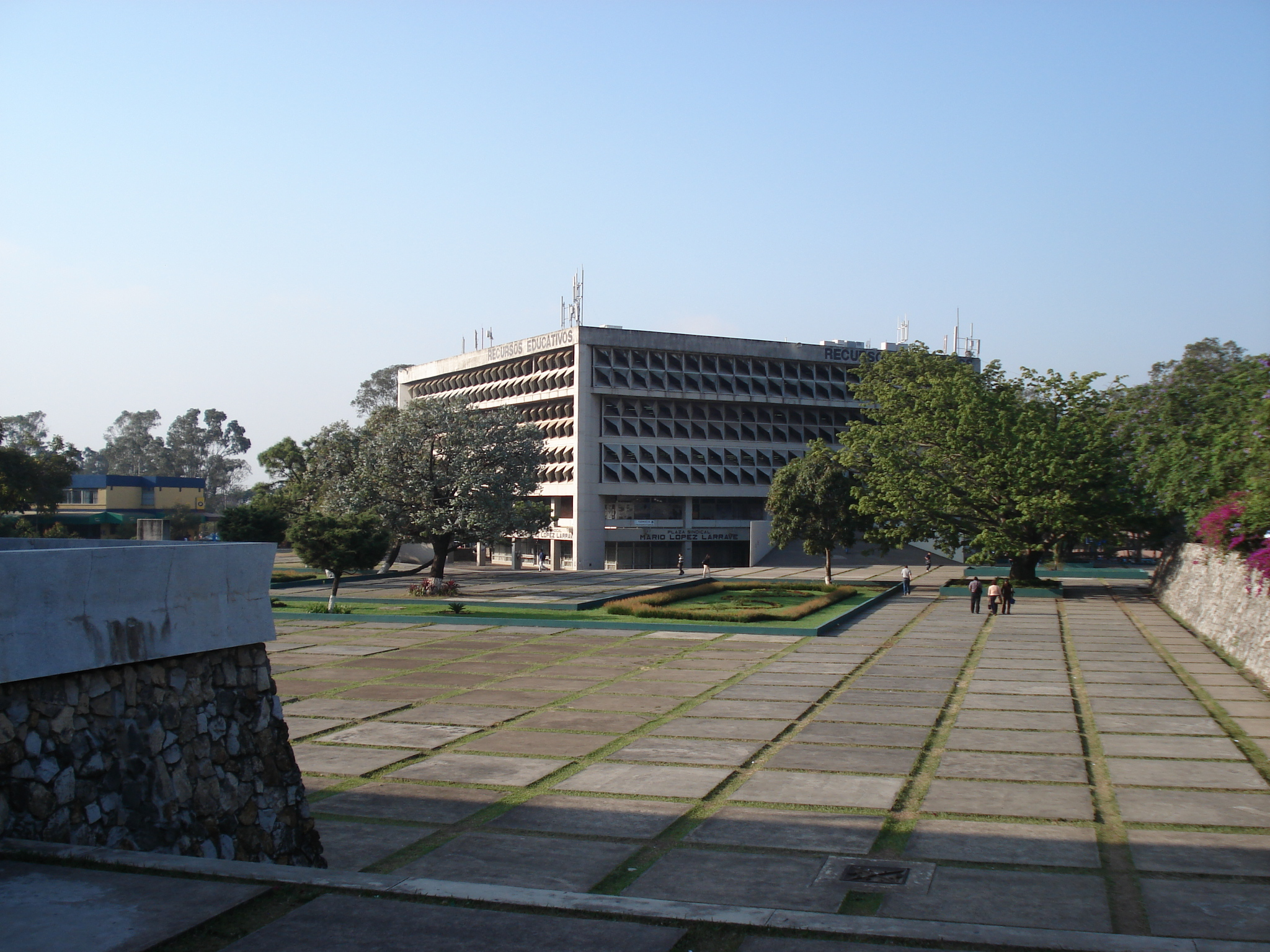

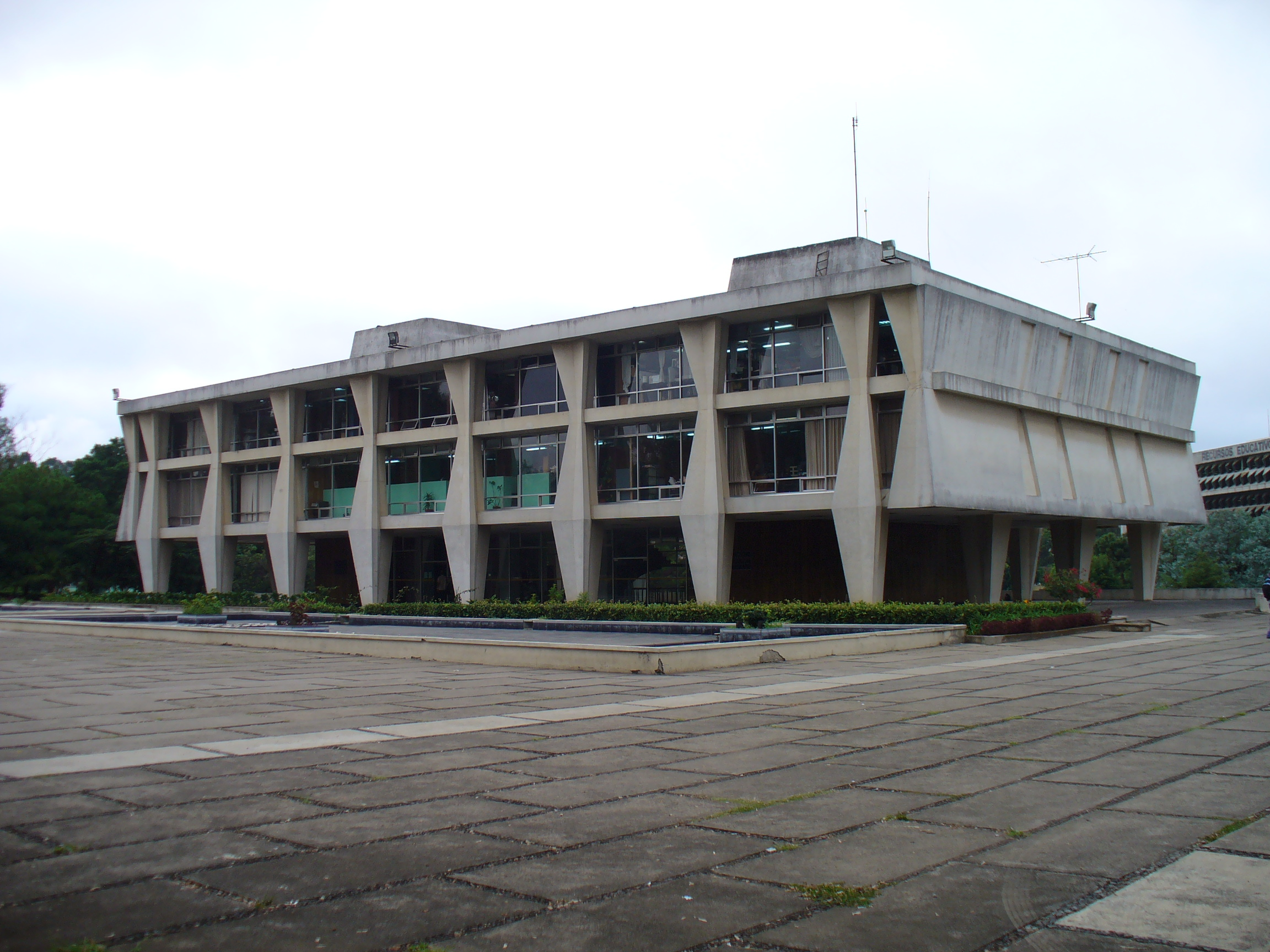

== See also ==
- Guatemala Civil War
- History of Guatemala
- List of universities in Guatemala
- List of colonial universities in Latin America

== Notes and references ==
=== Further reading ===
- Aguilera Peralta, Gabriel; Romero Imery, Jorge (1981). Dialéctica del terror en Guatemala (in Spanish). San José: EDUCA.
- Álvarez Aragón, Virgilo (2002). Conventos, aulas y trincheras. Universidad y movimiento estudiantil en Guatemala: La ilusión por conservar (in Spanish). Vol. I. Guatemala: FLACSO.
- Arévalo Martínez, Rafael (1945). ¡Ecce Pericles! (in Spanish). Guatemala: Tipografía Nacional.
- Bucheli, Marcelo; Jones, Geoffrey (2005). "The Octopus and the Generals: the United Fruit Company in Guatemala". Harvard Business School Case (9–805–146). Archived from the original on 2018-07-11.
- Cadena, Felipe (1774). Breve descripción de la noble ciudad de Santiago de los Caballeros de Guatemala y puntual noticia de su lamentable ruina ocasionada de un violento terremoto el día veintinueve July 1773 (PDF) (in Spanish). Mixco, Guatemala: Oficina de Antonio Sánchez Cubillas.
- Cazali Ávila, Augusto (1997). Historia de la Universidad de San Carlos de Guatemala, época republicana: (1821–1994 (in Spanish). Guatemala: Universitaria. ISBN 978-99922-59-46-7.
- Centro de Estudios Urbanos y Regionales (USAC) (1998). "Severo Martínez Peláez, In Memoriam: La Patria del Criollo, un cuarto de siglo después" (PDF). Boletín del CEUR-USAC (in Spanish). Guatemala. Archived from the original (PDF) on 17 June 2012.
- Cerigua (2011). "Distinguido docente de la USAC asesinado en 1981 será reconocido". Centro de Reportes Informativos sobre Guatemala. Guatemala. Archived from the original on 2015-02-05.
- Chapa Bezanilla, María de los Angeles (2004). Rafael Heliodoro Valle, humanista de América. Mexico City: National Autonomous University of Mexico, Instituto de Investigaciones Bibliográficas. ISBN 978-970-32-1915-5.
- Comisión para el Esclarecimiento Histórico: Agudización (1999). "Agudización de la Violencia y Militarización del Estado (1979–1985)". Guatemala: Memoria del Silencio (in Spanish). Programa de Ciencia y Derechos Humanos, Asociación Americana del Avance de la Ciencia. Archived from the original (online edition) on 6 May 2013.
- — (1999). Memoria del Silencio (PDF) (in Spanish). Vol. VI. Guatemala: Oficina de Servicios para Proyectos de las Naciones Unidas. ISBN 978-99922-54-06-6. Archived from the original (PDF) on 14 July 2014.
- — (1999). "Ejecuciones extrajudiciales de Manuel Colom Argueta y Alberto Fuentes Mohr". Guatemala: Memoria del Silencio (in Spanish). 11. Programa de Ciencia y Derechos Humanos, Asociación Americana del Avance de la Ciencia. Archived from the original (online edition) on 6 May 2013.
- Corte internacional de La Haya (1955). "Nottebohm case (second phase). Judgement of April sixth, 1955" (PDF). I.C.J. Reports: 4, fr. Archived from the original (PDF) on 2012-02-10.
- Dighero Herrera, Saúl (2002). Constitución Política de la República de Guatemala (aplicada en fallos de la Corte de Constitucionalidad) (PDF) (in Spanish). Guatemala: Corte de Constitucionalidad. Archived from the original (PDF) on 26 June 2014.
- El Guatemalteco (1929). "Decreto del organismo ejecutivo No. 953". El Guatemalteco, Diario Oficial de la República de Guatemala (in Spanish). Guatemala.
- — (22 March 1907a). "Decretos del Organismo Ejecutivo". El Guatemalteco, Diario Oficial de la República de Guatemala, en la América Central (in Spanish). Guatemala.
- — (22 May 1907b). "Reporte del Secretario de Estado a cargo del Despacho de Instrucción Pública". El Guatemalteco, Diario Oficial de la República de Guatemala, en la América Central (in Spanish). Guatemala.
- — (15 May 1918). "Decretos del Organismo Legislativo". El Guatemalteco, Diario Oficial de la República de Guatemala, en la América Central (in Spanish). Guatemala.
- El Imparcial (25 November 1944). "Féminas tendrán acceso a educación superior". El Imparcial (in Spanish). Guatemala.
- El País (1985). "10 muertos en Guatemala en la protesta contra la subida de precios". El País (in Spanish). Madrid, España.
- Facultad de Veterinaria y Zootecnia. "Manual de organización de la Facultad de Veterinaria" (PDF). Facultad de Veterinaria y Zootecnia de la Universidad de San Carlos (in Spanish). Guatemala.
- Fuentes Oliva, Regina (2012). "1920, una década de cambios educativos para Guatemala". Boletín AFEHC (in Spanish) (54).
- Gleijeses, Piero (1992). Shattered hope: the Guatemalan revolution and the United States, 1944–1954. Princeton University Press. ISBN 9780691025568.
- Hernández, Oswaldo (2013). "Tribunales de fuero especial: La justicia que fue de los generales". Plaza Pública (in Spanish). Guatemala.
- Hernández de León, Federico (1930). El libro de las efemérides (in Spanish). Guatemala: Sáchez y de Guise.
- Hernández Pico, Juan (2001). "Arduous Efforts for Institutionality". Revista Envío Digital (in Spanish) (237). Nicaragua: Universidad Centroamericana, UCA. Archived from the original on 7 October 2006.
- Immerman, Richard H. (1983). The CIA in Guatemala: The Foreign Policy of Intervention (in Spanish). Austin: University of Texas Press. ISBN 9780292710832.
- Lanning, John Tate. The Eighteenth-Century Enlightenment in the University of San Carlos de Guatemala. Ithaca: University Press Cornell 1958.
- Luján Muñoz, Luis (1980). Semblanza de José de Pineda Ibarra (in Spanish). Guatemala: José de Pineda Ibarra, Ministerio de Educación.
- Macías del Real, Antonio (1897). "Historia del desenvolvimiento intelectual de Guatemala". La Ilustración Guatemalteca (in Spanish). Guatemala: Síguere, Guirola y Cía.
- Melchor Toledo, Johann Estuardo (2011). "El arte religioso de la Antigua Guatemala, 1773–1821; crónica de la emigración de sus imágenes" (PDF). Tesis Doctoral en Historia del Arte (in Spanish). Mexico City: National Autonomous University of Mexico.
- Milla y Vidaurre, José (1984). "Memorias de un Abogado". Colección Textos Modernos (in Spanish). Guatemala: Escolar Piedrasanta.
- — (1898). "La Hija del Adelantado; Memorias de un Abogado (novela histórica)". In Goubaud, E. (ed.). Obras completas de don José Milla (in Spanish) (3^{a} ed.). Guatemala: E.Goubaud y Cía.
- Molina, José (2011). "Política económica del gobierno de Peralta Azurdia". Prensa Libre, Periódico Guatemalteco (in Spanish). Archived from the original on 12 August 2014.
- Paganini, Ricardo (1947). Historia De La Real y Pontificia Universidad de San Carlos de Guatemala (in Spanish). Guatemala, C.A.: Tipografía Nacional. pp. 49–197.
- Pérez Puente, Leticia (2012). "Los inicios del seminario de Nuestra Señora de la Asunción, 1568–1620: un proyecto exitoso y poco tridentino". Hispania Sacra (in Spanish). LXIV (129): 187–210. doi:10.3989/hs.2012.006.
- Sagastume Gemmell, Marco Antonio (2007). Síntesis Histórica: Universidad de San Carlos (in Spanish). Guatemala: Universitaria.
- Siglo 21 (9 July 2010). "Óscar Humberto Mejía Víctores". Siglo 21 (in Spanish). Guatemala. Archived from the original on 20 October 2013.
- Silva H., Margarita (n.d.). "Salvador Mendieta y la unión centroamericana". Academia.edu. Costa Rica: Universidad Nacional de Costa Rica.
- Tate Lanning, J. (1977). La Universidad en el Reino de Guatemala (in Spanish). Guatemala: Universitaria.
- Torres Espinoza, Enrique (2007). Enrique Gómez Carrillo, el cronista errante (in Spanish). Guatemala: Artermis y Edinter.
