= List of political parties in Guatemala =

This article lists political parties in Guatemala. Guatemala has a multi-party system, with two or three strong political parties and other parties that are electorally successful. According to law if a party fails to get 4% of the vote or at least one deputy in Congress, the party is canceled.

== Political culture ==
Political parties in Guatemala are generally numerous and unstable. No party has won the presidency more than once. In every election period, the majority of the parties are small and newly formed.

== Parties ==
Party		Ideology	Political position	2023 result	
Party		Ideology	Political position	Votes (%)	Seats
VAMOS	Let's Go for a Different Guatemala; Vamos por una Guatemala Diferente	Conservatism	Centre-right to right-wing	15.06%	39 / 160
UNE	National Unity of Hope; Unidad Nacional de la Esperanza	Populism	Centre	12.90%	28 / 160
Semilla	Seed Movement; Movimiento Semilla	Social democracy; Social liberalism	Centre-left	11.72%	23 / 160
CABAL	Cabal; Cabal	Liberalism	Centre-right	8.90%	18 / 160
VALOR	Valor; Valor	Conservatism	Right-wing to far-right	5.51%	12 / 160
PU	Unionist Party; Partido Unionista	Social conservatism; Economic liberalism	Far-right	5.51%	12 / 160
VIVA	Vision with Values; Visión con Valores	Christian right; Rhine capitalism	Right-wing	6.92%	11 / 160
TODOS	All; Todos	Christian right	Right-wing	4.05%	6 / 160
VOS	Will, Opportunity and Solidarity; Voluntad, Oportunidad y Solidaridad	Social democracy	Centre-left	4.47%	4 / 160
BIEN	National Well-Being; Bienestar Nacional	Populism	Right-wing	2.70%	4 / 160
PPN	Us; Nosotros	Populism	Right-wing	3.15%	3 / 160
Victoria	Victory; Victoria	-	Right-wing	3.00%	3 / 160
CREO	Commitment, Renewal and Order; Compromiso, Renovación y Orden	Social conservatism; Familism	Centre-right	2.03%	3 / 160
AZUL	Blue Party; Partido Azul	Conservatism	Right-wing	2.36%	2 / 160
CE	Elephant Community; Comunidad Elefante	Developmentalism	Right-wing	2.29%	2 / 160
WINAQ	Winaq; Winaq	Progressivism; Indigenismo; Left-wing nationalism	Left-wing	3.21%	1 / 160
URNG	Guatemalan National Revolutionary Unity; Unidad Revolucionaria Nacional Guatemalteca	Socialism; Left-wing nationalism	Left-wing to far-left	3.21%	1 / 160
CAMBIO	Change; Cambio	Populism	Right-wing	1.26%	1 / 160

=== Extra-parliamentary parties ===
Name		Ideology	Political position	Leader
PPG	Guatemalan People's Party; Partido Popular Guatemalteco	Municipalism	Centre-right	Neto Bran
PHG	Humanist Party of Guatemala; Partido Humanista de Guatemala	Humanism	Right-wing	Rudio Lecsan Mérida
MLP	Movement for the Liberation of Peoples; Movimiento para la Liberación de los Pueblos	Indigenismo; Left-wing populism	Left-wing to far-left	Thelma Cabrera
MF	My Family; Mi Familia	Conservatism	Right-wing	Julio Rivera
PAN	National Advancement Party; Partido de Avanzada Nacional	Conservatism	Far-right	Manuel Conde Orellana
FCN	National Convergence Front; Frente de Convergencia Nacional	Nationalism	Right-wing to far-right	Jimmy Morales
PIN	National Integration Party; Partido de Integración Nacional	Conservatism	Right-wing	Luis Lam Padilla
PODER	Opportunities and Development Party; Partido de Oportunidades y Desarrollo	Conservatism	Right-wing	Walfre Oswaldo Lara
Podemos	We Can; Podemos	Conservatism	Centre-right	Roberto Arzú
PR	Republican Party; Partido Republicano	Conservatism	Right-wing	Rafael Espada
UR	Republican Union; Unión Republicana	Conservatism	Right-wing	Giulio Talamonti

== Political parties in formation ==
Name		Ideology	Political position	Leader
NC	New Citizenship‡ Nueva Ciudadanía			
FG	Guatemala Force; Fuerza Guatemala			
PT	Workers' Party; Partido de los Trabajadores			
SUMA	Suma; Suma			
GP	Guatemala Possible; Guatemala Posible			
SG	Somos Guatemala; Somos Guatemala		Left-wing	
AxJ	Alliance for Justice; Alianza por la Justicia	Progressivism	Left-wing	
PJ	Jaguar; Jaguar			
PVG	Guatemalan Green Party; Partido Verde Guatemalteco	Green politics		
UxG	United for Guatemala; Unidos por Guatemala			
UNO	Organized National Union; Unión Nacional Organizada			
JUNTOS	Together; Juntos	Conservatism	Right-wing	Juan Carlos Eggenberger
AGUA	Amo a Guatemala; Amo a Guatemala			
APV	Political Openness with Values; Apertura Política con Valores			
ARENA	Allies for the Republic and the Nation; Aliados por la República y la Nación			
VEN	Voices of New Hope; Voces de Esperanza Nueva			
PCC	Citizen Change Party; Partido Cambio Ciudadano			
ACTUA	Actúa; Actúa			
CDG	Guatemalan Democratic Center; Centro Democrático Guatemalteco			
PF	Fusionist Party; Partido Fusionista			
AP	People's Alliance; Alianza Popular			
ML	Freedom Movement; Movimiento Libertad	Conservatism	Centre-right	
RL	Free Republic; República Libre			
PPU	United Fatherland Party; Partido Patria Unida			
NI	New Ideas; Nuevas Ideas	Bukelism		José Luis Araneda Cintrón
BUS	United Brigades in Social Democracy; Brigadas Unidas en Socialdemocracia	Social democracy	Centre-left	
AP	Political Action; Acción Política			
NT	New Times; Nuevos Tiempos			
CC	Celestial Citizenship; Ciudadanía Celeste	Liberalism	Centre-right	Marielos Chang

== Parties that did not contest the 2007 election ==
- Reform Movement (Movimiento Reformador)
- Social Democrat Party

== Former parties ==
- Deregistered or ceased to function before 2003:
  - Socialist Workers Unification
- Deregistered in 2003:
  - Social Participative Democracy (Democracia Social Participativa)
  - Transparency (Transparencia)
- Deregistered in 2007:
  - Authentic Integral Development (Desarollo Integral Auténtico)
  - Front for Democracy (Frente por la Democracia)
  - Guatemalan Christian Democracy (Democracia Cristiana Guatemalteca)
  - New Nation Alliance (Alianza Nueva Nación)
- Deregistered in 2015:
  - Partido Patriota (Partido Patriota)
- Institutional Republican Party (Partido Republicano Institucional (PRI)) - formerly Guatemalan Republican Front (Frente Republicano Guatemalteco)
- Renewed Democratic Liberty (Libertad Democrática Renovada (LIDER))
- Movimiento Nueva República (MNR) (Movimiento Nueva República (MNR))
- Social Action Centre (Centro de Acción Social (CASA))
- New Heart Nation - (Corazon Nueva Nacion (CNN))
- Became the Grand National Alliance:
  - National Solidarity Party (Partido Solidaridad Nacional)
- Citizen Prosperity (Prosperidad Ciudadana (PC))
- Advance (Avanza)
- Deregistered in 2020:
  - Productivity and Work Party (Partido Productividad y Trabajo (PPT))
  - Encounter for Guatemala (Encuentro por Guatemala (EG))
  - Convergence (Convergencia)
  - United (Unidos)
  - Free (Libre)
  - Force (Fuerza)
- National Change Union (Unión del Cambio Nacional (UCN))

== See also ==
- Politics of Guatemala
- Elections in Guatemala
