= President of Guatemala =

Head of state and government

President of the Republic of Guatemala
- Presidente de la República de Guatemala
- Coat of arms of the President

- Presidential flag

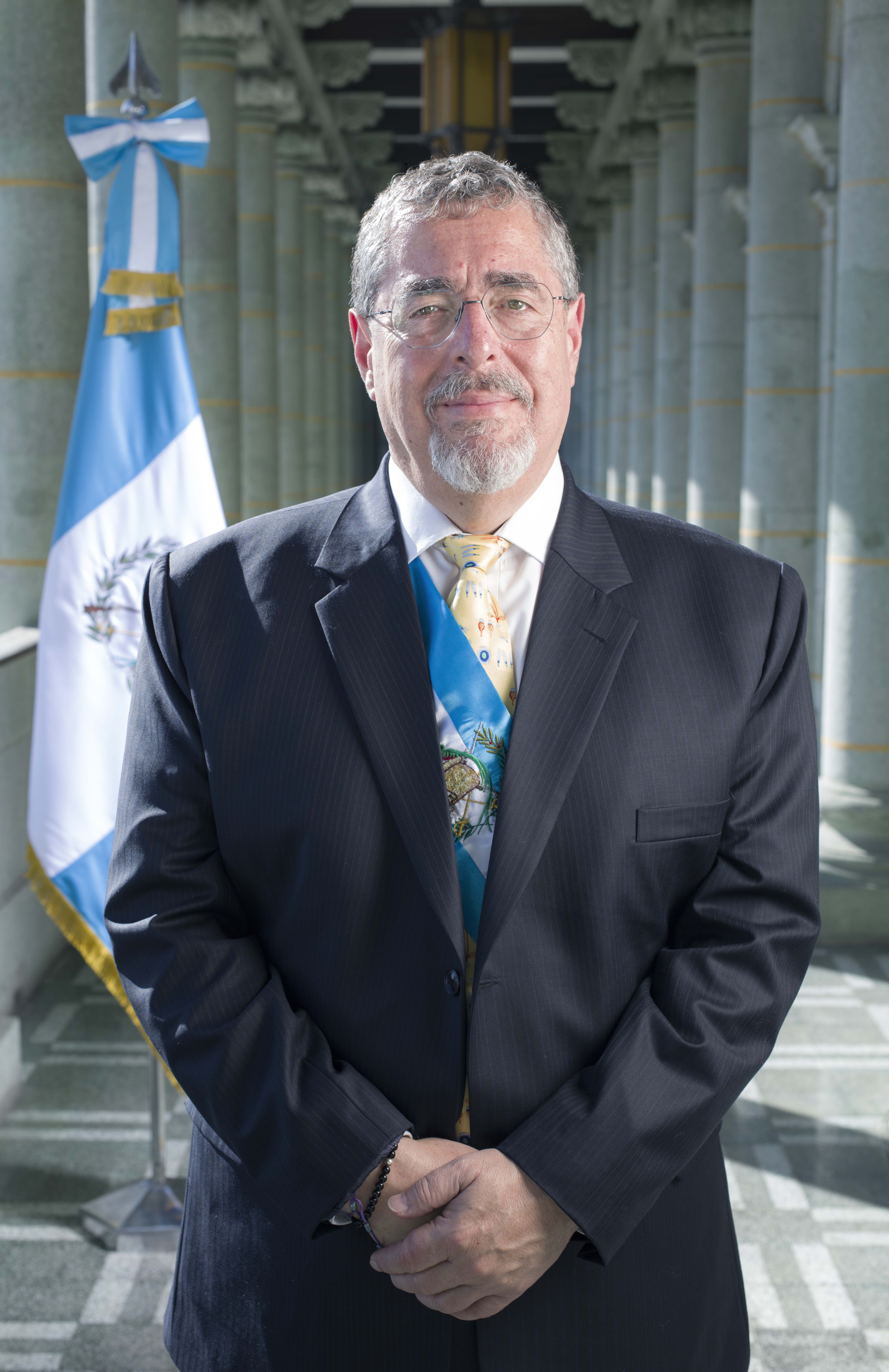
- Incumbent; Bernardo Arévalo since 14 January 2024
- Office of the President of Guatemala; National Security Council
- Style: His/Her Excellency Mr./Madam President of the Republic (Excelentísimo/a Señor/a Presidente/a de la República) (official); Mr./Madam President (Señor/a Presidente/a) (informal); The Most Excellent (Excelentísimo/a Señor/a) (diplomatic); His/Her Excellency (Su Excelencia) (diplomatic)
- Status: Head of state Head of government
- Member of: Cabinet
- Residence: Casa Crema
- Seat: Guatemala City
- Appointer: Supreme Electoral Court
- Term length: Four years, non renewable
- Constituting instrument: Constitution of Guatemala (1986)
- Inaugural holder: Mariano Rivera Paz
- Formation: December 3, 1839 (186 years ago)
- Deputy: Vice President of Guatemala
- Salary: Q 146,950 monthly (US$18,863 as of May 2023)
- Website: www.presidencia.gob.gt

La Granadera
"La Granadera" is the official march of the national flag and the president of Guatemala

The president of Guatemala (Spanish: Presidente de Guatemala), officially titled President of the Republic of Guatemala (Spanish: Presidente de la República de Guatemala), is the head of state and head of government of Guatemala, elected to a single four-year term. The position of President was created in 1839.

== Selection process ==
=== Eligibility ===
Article 185 of the Constitution, sets the following requirements to qualify for the presidency:

- be Guatemalan of origin who is a citizen in good standing;
- be at least 40 years old.

A person who meets the above qualifications would, however, still be disqualified from holding the office of president if the individual:

- Was the leader or the head of a coup d'état, armed revolution, or similar movement, that had altered the constitutional order, and as a result of their actions became the Head of Government;
- Exercised the role of President or Vice President during an election, or at any point within the presidential period in which elections are conducted.
- Are relatives of the incumbent president or vice president prior to the succeeding election;
- Served as a Minister within the government, for any time in the six months before the election;
- Served as a member of the Armed Forces unless they are on leave or have been in retirement for at least five years before the election;
- Are ministers of any religion or cult;
- Are magistrates of the Supreme Electoral Tribunal.

=== Term limit ===
The President serves a four-year term and is prohibited from seeking re-election or extending their tenure. Moreover, a person who held the position of president for more than two years is barred from running for office again.

== Executive powers ==
Article 183 of the Constitution, confers the following duties and competencies to the president:

- Comply with and enforce the Constitution and laws.
- Provide the defense and security of the Nation, as well as the preservation of public order.
- Exercise the command of the Armed Forces of Guatemala with all the respective functions and attributions.
- Exercise the command of the National Police.
- Approve, promulgate, execute and enforce laws.
- Dictate the provisions that are necessary in cases of serious emergency or public calamity, having to report to the Congress in its immediate sessions.
- Submit proposals of laws to the Congress.
- Exercise the right of veto with respect to the laws issued by the Congress, except in cases in which it is not necessary to sanction the executive branch in accordance with the Constitution.
- Present annually to the Congress, at the beginning of its session, written report on the general situation of the Republic and of the business of its administration carried out during the previous year.
- Submit annually to the Congress, for approval with no less than one hundred and twenty days prior to the date on which the fiscal year begins, through the Ministry of Public Finance, the draft budget that contains in detail the income and expenditures of the State. If the Congress is not in session, it must hold extraordinary sessions to hear about the project.
- Submit for consideration of the Congress for approval, and before ratification, treaties and conventions of international character and contracts and concessions on public services.
- To summon the Legislative Organism to extraordinary sessions when the interests of the Republic demand it.
- Coordinate the development policy of the Nation through the Council of Ministers.
- Preside over the Council of Ministers and exercise the function of hierarchical superior of the officials and employees of the Executive Organism.
- Maintain the territorial integrity and dignity of the Nation.
- Direct foreign policy and international relations, pronounce, ratify and denounce treaties and agreements in accordance with the Constitution.
- Receive the diplomatic representatives, as well as issue and withdraw the exequatur to the patents of the consuls.
- Administer public finances in accordance with the law.
- Exonerate of fines and surcharges to the taxpayers who have incurred in them for not covering the taxes within the legal terms for acts or omissions in the administrative order.
- Appoint and remove ministers of state, deputy ministers, secretaries and undersecretaries of the presidency, ambassadors and other officials that correspond to it according to the law.
- Grant premiums, pensions and subsidies in accordance with the Law.
- Award decorations to Guatemalans and foreigners.
- Within the fifteen days following its conclusion, inform the Congress about the purpose of any trip that has taken place outside the national territory and about the results thereof.
- Submit every four months to the Congress through the respective ministry an analytical report on the budget execution, for its knowledge and control.
- Exercise all other functions assigned by the Constitution or the law.

== Vacancies and succession ==
Article 189 of the Constitution establishes the presidential line of succession. If the president is temporarily absent, the vice president takes over the presidency. If the absence of the President is permanent, the vice president holds the presidency until the end of the constitutional period. In the event of a double vacancy, Congress has the authority to designate an acting president by a vote of two-thirds of the total number of deputies.

== List of presidents ==
Note: Regarding the numbering of the terms, several reliable sources state that Jimmy Morales is the 50th president

=== State of Guatemala (1839–1847) ===
No.	Portrait	Name (Birth–Death)	Term of office			Political party	Elected
No.	Portrait	Name (Birth–Death)	Took office	Left office	Time in office	Political party	Elected
1		Mariano Rivera Paz (1804–1849)	3 December 1839	25 February 1842	2 years, 84 days	Conservative	—
2		José Venancio López (1791–1863); Acting	25 February 1842	14 May 1842	78 days	Independent	—
3		Mariano Rivera Paz (1804–1849)	14 May 1842	14 December 1844	2 years, 214 days	Conservative	—
4		Rafael Carrera (1814–1865)	14 December 1844	16 August 1848	3 years, 246 days	Conservative	—

=== Republic from Carrera to the Liberal Revolution (1847–1871) ===
No.	Portrait	Name (Birth–Death)	Term of office			Political party	Elected
No.	Portrait	Name (Birth–Death)	Took office	Left office	Time in office	Political party	Elected
4		Rafael Carrera (1814–1865)	14 December 1844	16 August 1848	3 years, 246 days	Conservative	—
5		Juan Antonio Martínez (?–1854); Acting	16 August 1848	28 November 1848	104 days	Conservative	—
6		José Bernardo Escobar (1797–1849); Acting	28 November 1848	1 January 1849	34 days	Conservative	—
7		Mariano Paredes (1800–1856); Acting	1 January 1849	6 November 1851	2 years, 309 days	Independent	—
8		Rafael Carrera (1814–1865)	6 November 1851	14 April 1865	13 years, 159 days	Conservative	—
9		Pedro de Aycinena y Piñol (1802–1897); Acting	14 April 1865	24 May 1865	40 days	Conservative	—
10		Vicente Cerna Sandoval (1815–1885)	24 May 1865	29 June 1871	6 years, 36 days	Conservative	—

=== Liberal period (1871–1944) ===
No.	Portrait	Name (Birth–Death)	Term of office			Political party	Elected
No.	Portrait	Name (Birth–Death)	Took office	Left office	Time in office	Political party	Elected
11		Miguel García Granados (1809–1878)	29 June 1871	4 June 1873	1 year, 340 days	Liberal	—
12		Justo Rufino Barrios (1835–1885)	4 June 1873	2 April 1885	11 years, 302 days	Liberal	1873; 1880
13		Alejandro M. Sinibaldi (1825–1896); Acting	2 April 1885	5 April 1885	3 days	Liberal	—
14		Manuel Barillas (1845–1907)	6 April 1885	15 March 1892	6 years, 345 days	Liberal	—
15		José María Reina Barrios (1854–1898)	15 March 1892	8 February 1898	5 years, 330 days	Liberal	1892
16		Manuel Estrada Cabrera (1857–1924)	8 February 1898	15 April 1920	22 years, 67 days	Liberal	1898; 1904; 1910; 1916
17		Carlos Herrera (1856–1930)	15 April 1920	10 December 1921	1 year, 239 days	Unionist Party	1920 (Apr); 1920 (Aug)
18		José María Orellana (1872–1926)	10 December 1921	26 September 1926	4 years, 290 days	Liberal	1921; 1922
19		Lázaro Chacón González (1873–1931)	26 September 1926	12 December 1930	4 years, 77 days	Unionist Party	1926
—		Baudilio Palma (1880–1930); Acting	13 December 1930	17 December 1930	4 days	Conservative	—
—		Manuel María Orellana Contreras (1870–1940); De facto	17 December 1930	2 January 1931	16 days	Liberal	—
20		José María Reina Andrade (1860–1947); Acting	2 January 1931	14 February 1931	43 days	Liberal	—
21		Jorge Ubico (1878–1946)	14 February 1931	1 July 1944	13 years, 138 days	Progressive Liberal Party	1931
22		Juan Federico Ponce Vaides (1889–1956); Acting	4 July 1944	20 October 1944	108 days	Progressive Liberal Party	July 1944

=== Ten-Year Revolution (1944–1954) ===
The dictatorial government of Jorge Ubico, which persisted since 1931, was overthrown by a revolution known as the "Ten Years of Spring" on 4 July 1944. After more than a month of mass student and trade union protests, Ubico resigned and fled to Mexico, transferring powers to his First Deputy, Federico Ponce Vaides. Presidential elections were held on 4 July 1944, which declared Ponce as the president. However, the opposition rejected the results, and as a result, on 20 October 1944, a group of young officers overthrew Ponce, creating a military-civilian government called the Revolutionary Government Junta. A new constitution was adopted and elections were held, which resulted in the victory of Juan José Arévalo in 1944 and Jacobo Árbenz in 1950. During this period, Guatemala underwent numerous social and economic reforms, including large-scale land reform.

No.	Portrait	Name (Birth–Death)	Term of office			Political party	Elected
No.	Portrait	Name (Birth–Death)	Took office	Left office	Time in office	Political party	Elected
23		Revolutionary Government Junta	20 October 1944	15 March 1945	146 days	Military	—
24		Juan José Arévalo (1904–1990)	15 March 1945	15 March 1951	6 years	Revolutionary Action Party	1944
25		Jacobo Árbenz (1913–1971)	15 March 1951	27 June 1954 (Deposed)	3 years, 104 days	Revolutionary Action Party / Party of the Guatemalan Revolution	1950

=== Military governments (1954–1958) ===
Upon presenting his resignation, Jacobo Árbenz left Colonel Carlos Enrique Díaz, head of the Armed Forces, in charge of the presidency. Diaz's first measure was the integration of a provisional government board which he led alongside Colonels Elfego H. Monzón and José Ángel Sánchez. On 29 June, Díaz was forced to resign, leading to Monzón succeeding as the new chairman of the board. Monzón would assemble a new governing board and incorporate Colonel Castillo Armas, Juan Mauricio Dubois, Jose Luis Cruz Salazar, and Enrique Oliva.

The new board would dissolve after a popular plebiscite held on 10 October 1954 would allow Colonel Castillo Armas to assume the presidency. Under Armas' mandate, several reforms implemented during the Guatemalan Revolution were suspended, and political opponents, as well as unions and peasant organizations, were persecuted. Armas' assassination on 26 July 1957, would prompt Congress to appoint Luis Arturo González as acting president and condition him to call for elections within four months.

The planned election was held on 20 October 1957, but the results were later nullified due to allegations of fraud. President González would resign and cede power to a provisional governing board led by Óscar Mendoza Azurdia, Gonzalo Yurrita Nova, and Roberto Lorenzana. The new board would govern for two days before Congress would appoint Colonel Guillermo Flores Avendaño as acting president. President Avendaño would call for elections in January 1958.

No.	Portrait	Name (Birth–Death)	Term of office			Political party	Elected
No.	Portrait	Name (Birth–Death)	Took office	Left office	Time in office	Political party	Elected
26		Carlos Enrique Díaz de León (1915–2014); Provisional President	27 June 1954	29 June 1954	2 days	Military	—
27		Elfego Hernán Monzón Aguirre (1912–1981); Chairman of Military Junta	29 June 1954	8 July 1954	9 days	National Liberation Movement	—
28		Carlos Castillo Armas (1914–1957)	8 July 1954	26 July 1957	3 years, 18 days	National Liberation Movement	1954
29		Luis Arturo González López (1900–1965); Acting	27 July 1957	24 October 1957	89 days	National Liberation Movement	—
30		Óscar Mendoza Azurdia (1917–1995); Chairman of Military Junta	24 October 1957	26 October 1957	2 days	Military	—
31		Guillermo Flores Avendaño (1894–1982); Acting	26 October 1957	2 March 1958	129 days	Military	—

=== Civil War period (1958–1996) ===
No.	Portrait	Name (Birth–Death)	Term of office			Political party	Elected
No.	Portrait	Name (Birth–Death)	Took office	Left office	Time in office	Political party	Elected
32		Miguel Ydígoras Fuentes (1895–1982)	2 March 1958	31 March 1963 (Deposed)	5 years, 29 days	Military / REDENCION	1958
33		Enrique Peralta Azurdia (1908–1997)	31 March 1963	1 July 1966	3 years, 92 days	Institutional Democratic Party	—
34		Julio César Méndez Montenegro (1915–1996)	1 July 1966	1 July 1970	4 years	Revolutionary Party	1966
35		Carlos Manuel Arana Osorio (1918–2003)	1 July 1970	1 July 1974	4 years	Institutional Democratic Party	1970
36		Kjell Eugenio Laugerud García (1930–2009)	1 July 1974	1 July 1978	4 years	Institutional Democratic Party	1974
37		Fernando Romeo Lucas García (1924–2006)	1 July 1978	23 March 1982 (Deposed)	3 years, 265 days	Institutional Democratic Party	1978
38		Efraín Ríos Montt (1926–2018)	23 March 1982	8 August 1983 (Deposed)	1 year, 138 days	Military	—
39		Óscar Humberto Mejía Víctores (1930–2016)	8 August 1983	14 January 1986	2 years, 159 days	Military	—
40		Vinicio Cerezo (born 1942)	14 January 1986	14 January 1991	5 years	Guatemalan Christian Democracy	1985
41		Jorge Serrano Elías (born 1945)	14 January 1991	1 June 1993 (Resigned)	2 years, 138 days	Solidarity Action Movement	1990
42		Gustavo Adolfo Espina Salguero (1946–2024); Acting	1 June 1993	5 June 1993	4 days	Solidarity Action Movement	—
43		Ramiro de León Carpio (1942–2002)	6 June 1993	14 January 1996	2 years, 222 days	Independent	1993

=== Contemporary period (1996–present) ===
No.	Portrait	Name (Birth–Death)	Term of office			Political party	Elected
No.	Portrait	Name (Birth–Death)	Took office	Left office	Time in office	Political party	Elected
44		Álvaro Arzú (1946–2018)	14 January 1996	14 January 2000	4 years	National Advancement Party / Unionist Party	1995–1996
45		Alfonso Portillo (born 1951)	14 January 2000	14 January 2004	4 years	Guatemalan Republican Front	1999
46		Óscar Berger (born 1946)	14 January 2004	14 January 2008	4 years	National Solidarity Party / Grand National Alliance	2003
47		Álvaro Colom (1951–2023)	14 January 2008	14 January 2012	4 years	National Unity of Hope	2007
48		Otto Pérez Molina (born 1950)	14 January 2012	3 September 2015 (Resigned)	3 years, 232 days	Patriotic Party / Grand National Alliance	2011
49		Alejandro Maldonado (born 1936); Acting	3 September 2015	14 January 2016	133 days	Independent	—
50		Jimmy Morales (born 1969)	14 January 2016	14 January 2020	4 years	National Convergence Front	2015
51		Alejandro Giammattei (born 1956)	14 January 2020	14 January 2024	4 years	Vamos	2019
52		Bernardo Arévalo (born 1958)	14 January 2024	Incumbent (Term ends on 14 January 2028)	2 years, 275 days	Semilla	2023

== Latest election ==
Candidate	Running mate	Party	First round		Second round	
Candidate	Running mate	Party	Votes	%	Votes	%
Sandra Torres	Romeo Guerra	National Unity of Hope	881,592	20.98	1,567,664	39.09
Bernardo Arévalo	Karin Herrera	Semilla	654,534	15.58	2,442,718	60.91
Manuel Conde	Luis Antonio Suárez	Vamos	435,631	10.37		
Armando Castillo	Édgar Grisolia	Vision with Values	404,059	9.61		
Edmond Mulet	Máximo Santa Cruz	Cabal	371,857	8.85		
Zury Ríos	Héctor Cifuentes	Valor–Unionist	365,028	8.69		
Manuel Villacorta	Jorge Mario García	Will, Opportunity and Solidarity	238,686	5.68		
Giovanni Reyes	Óscar Figueroa	Bienestar Nacional	141,714	3.37		
Amílcar Rivera	Fernando Mazariegos	Victory	135,591	3.23		
Amílcar Pop	Mónica Enríquez	Winaq–URNG–MAIZ	87,676	2.09		
Ricardo Sagastume	Guillermo González	Todos	76,582	1.82		
Rudy Guzmán	Diego González	Nosotros	66,116	1.57		
Isaac Farchi	Mauricio Zaldaña	Blue Party	61,472	1.46		
Julio Rivera	José Urrutia	My Family	46,092	1.10		
Francisco Arredondo	Francisco Bermúdez	Commitment, Renewal and Order	41,948	1.00		
Giulio Talamonti	Óscar Barrientos	Republican Union	40,358	0.96		
Hugo Peña	Hugo Johnson	Elephant Community	39,271	0.93		
Rudio Lecsan Mérida	Rubén Darío Rosales	Humanist Party	34,285	0.82		
Rafael Espada	Arturo Herrador	Republican Party	32,139	0.76		
Sammy Morales	Miguel Ángel Moir	National Convergence Front	22,316	0.53		
Álvaro Trujillo	Miguel Ángel Ibarra	Change	17,715	0.42		
Luis Lam Padilla	Otto Marroquín	National Integration Party	7,780	0.19		
Total			4,202,442	100.00	4,010,382	100.00
Valid votes			4,202,442	75.62	4,010,382	95.25
Invalid votes			966,389	17.39	147,165	3.50
Blank votes			388,442	6.99	52,687	1.25
Total votes			5,557,273	100.00	4,210,234	100.00
Registered voters/turnout			9,249,794	60.08	9,361,068	44.98
Source: TSE (first round; 99.13% counted) TSE (second round; 100% counted)
