= Podemos (Guatemala) =

We Can Podemos
- Leader: Roberto Arzú
- Secretary-General: José Raul Virgil Arias
- Founded: 3 August 2002 (MR); 12 June 2019 (Podemos)
- Registered: 6 April 1995 (as PLG)
- Dissolved: 8 January 2024
- Split from: Unionist Party (Podemos)
- Ideology: Conservatism; Right-wing populism
- Political position: Centre-right to right-wing

Podemos (lit. 'We Can'), previously the Movimiento Reformador (English: Reform Movement) was a conservative political party in Guatemala. It was led by Roberto Arzú.

== 2003 election ==
At the 2003 general election held on 9 November 2003, the party was part of the Grand National Alliance. In the legislative election, the Alliance won 24.3% of the vote, and 47 out of 158 seats in Congress. The presidential candidate of the alliance, Óscar Berger Perdomo, won 34.3% at the presidential elections of the same day. He won 54.1% in the second round and was elected president.

Party leader Jorge Briz, who had run unsuccessfully for mayor of Guatemala City, was rewarded with the position of Foreign Minister in Berger's cabinet, a post he held until resigning in August 2006. Shortly after his resignation from the cabinet, the Reform Movement officially broke with the GANA alliance.

== 2007 election ==
The Reform Movement declined to participate in the 2007 general election.

== Electoral history ==
=== Presidential elections ===
Election	Candidates		First round		Second round		Status
Election	President	Vice President	Votes	%	Votes	%	Status
2003 (Note: Run in coalition with PP and PSN.)	Óscar Berger	Eduardo Stein	921,316	34.33	1,235,303	54.13	Won
2007	None	None	—	—	—	—	Did not participate
2011	None	None	—	—	—	—	Did not participate
2015	None	None	—	—	—	—	Did not participate
2019	Roberto Arzú (Note: In alliance with National Advancement Party.)	José Antonio Farias	267,049	6.10	—	—	Lost
2023	Roberto Arzú	David Pineda	—	—	—	—	Disqualified

=== Legislative elections ===
Election	Votes	%	Seats	+/–	Status
2003 (Note: Run in coalition with PP and PSN.)	620,121	24.30 (#1)	47 / 158	New	Government
2007	Did not participate		0 / 158	▼47	Extra-parliamentary
2011	Did not participate		0 / 158	0	Extra-parliamentary
2015	36,693	0.80 (#16)	0 / 158	0	Extra-parliamentary
2019	67,610	1.68 (#21)	1 / 160	▲1	Opposition
2023	86,475	2.07 (#15)	0 / 160	▼1	Extra-parliamentary
