= Black Thursday (Guatemala) =

July 2003 political clashes in Guatemala

- Part of the 2003 Guatemalan general election
- Date: 24–25 July 2003
- Location: Guatemala City, Guatemala
- Caused by: Rejection of Efraín Ríos Montt as a candidate in the 2003 Guatemalan general election
- Goals: Court order allowing Ríos Montt to participate in the election
- Result: Ríos Montt allowed to participate by 14 July 2003 decision of the Constitutional Court of Guatemala

Parties
Guatemalan Republican Front	Government of Guatemala; National Civil Police

Lead figures
Efraín Ríos Montt; Zury Ríos	Alfonso Portillo

Black Thursday (Spanish: Jueves negro) was a series of violent political demonstrations in Guatemala City, Guatemala during the 2003 Guatemalan general election. Armed supporters of the Guatemalan Republican Front and former President Efraín Ríos Montt rioted in protest of the Supreme Court of Justice ruling that he was constitutionally barred from seeking the presidency.

== Events ==
In May 2003, the Guatemalan Republican Front (FRG) political party selected former military dictator Efraín Ríos Montt as its candidate for the forthcoming November general election. However, his candidacy was rejected by the electoral registry and by two lower courts, on the grounds of a constitutional ban preventing former coup leaders from seeking the presidency. (Ríos Montt had come to power by means of a coup d'état on 23 March 1982.) On 14 July 2003, the Constitutional Court, which had had several judges appointed from the FRG, approved his candidacy for president, arguing that the terms of the 1985 Constitution could not be applied retroactively.

On 20 July, however, the Supreme Court suspended his campaign for the presidency and agreed to hear a complaint brought by two right-of-centre parties that the general was constitutionally barred from running for president of the country. Ríos Montt denounced the ruling as judicial manipulation and, in a radio address, called on his followers to take to the streets to protest against this decision. On 24 July, the day known as 'jueves negro', thousands of masked FRG supporters invaded the streets of Guatemala City, armed with machetes, clubs and guns. They had been bussed in from all over the country by the FRG amidst claims that people working in FRG-controlled municipalities were being blackmailed with being sacked if they did not attend the demonstration. The demonstrators blocked traffic, chanted threatening slogans, and waved their machetes about.

They were led by well known FRG militants, including a well known member of Congress, who was photographed by the press early in the morning while co-ordinating the actions, and the secretary of Ríos Montt's daughter, Zury. The demonstrators marched on the courts, the opposition parties' headquarters, and newspapers, torching buildings, shooting out windows and burning cars and tyres in the streets. A TV journalist, Héctor Ramírez, intervened to try to save a colleague who was being attacked by the demonstrators and died of a heart attack while running away from the mob. The situation was so chaotic over the weekend that both the UN mission and the U.S. embassy were closed.

Following the rioting, the Constitutional Court, packed with allies of Ríos Montt and his protégé, President Alfonso Portillo, overturned the Supreme Court decision, upholding Ríos Montt's claim that the ban on coup leaders, formalized in the 1985 Constitution, could not be applied retroactively to acts before that date. Many Guatemalans expressed anger over the Court's decision.

== Aftermath ==
Gen. Ríos Montt went on to place third in the November presidential vote, behind Álvaro Colom and Óscar Berger.

Criminal charges were brought against seven FRG members for their role in inciting the riot and the manslaughter of Ramírez: Gen. Ríos Montt himself; Ingrid Elaine Argueta Sosa, his niece; Waleska Sánchez Velásquez, the secretary of Zury Ríos Montt; Jorge Arévalo, a congressional deputy; and Raúl Manchamé Leiva, a former director of the national police. All were placed under house arrest. The charges against Gen. Ríos Montt were dismissed in January 2006.

In a related case, Carlos Ríos and four other members of the FRG were sentenced to three-year prison terms for racial discrimination (Guatemala's first such prosecution) for having levelled ethnic slurs at Nobel Peace Prize winner Rigoberta Menchú during a later challenge lodged with the Constitutional Court. By paying stiffer fines in accordance with Guatemalan law, however, the five were able to avoid jail time.
