= 2007 Guatemalan general election =

- Presidential election
- 9 September 2007 (first round); 4 November 2007 (second round)
- Turnout: 60.36% (first round) ▲2.47pp 48.20% (second round) ▲1.42pp
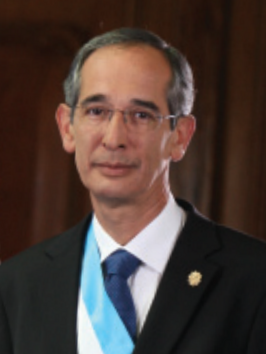

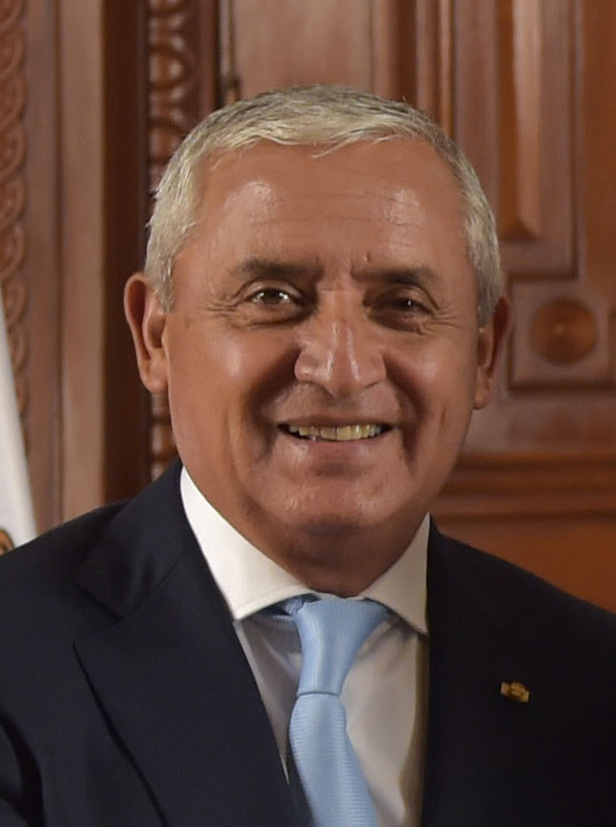
Nominee	Álvaro Colom	Otto Pérez Molina
Party	UNE	PP
Running mate	Rafael Espada	Ricardo Castillo
Popular vote	1,449,533	1,295,108
Percentage	52.81%	47.19%
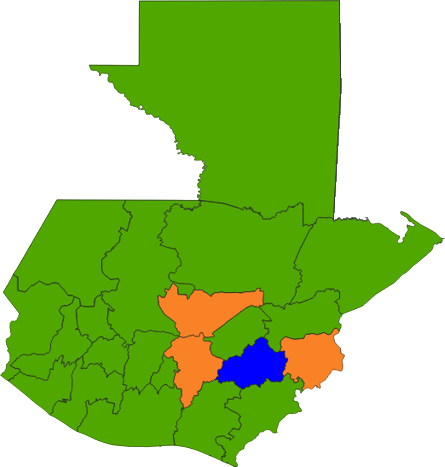
- Results by department
President before election
Óscar Berger
GANA
President-elect
Álvaro Colom
UNE

General elections were held in Guatemala on 9 September to elect a new President and Vice President of the Republic, 158 congressional deputies, and 332 mayors. As no presidential candidate received a majority of the vote, a second round was held on 4 November.

Colom was elected President of Guatemala. It would mark the first time since 1954 that Guatemala had a left wing government.

== Presidential and vice-presidential candidates ==
- Óscar Castañeda (VP: Roger Valenzuela) for the National Advancement Party (PAN)
- Vinicio Cerezo Blandón (VP: Pablo Ramírez Rivas) for Guatemalan Christian Democracy (DCG). Cerezo Blandón is the son of Vinicio Cerezo Arévalo, who served as president from 1986 to 1991.
- Álvaro Colom (VP: José Rafael Espada) for the National Unity of Hope (UNE). Colom was the runner-up in the 2003 presidential election.
- Manuel Conde Orellana (VP: Juan Francisco Manrique) for the Democratic Union (UD)
- Mario Estrada (VP: Mario Torres Marroquín) for the Nationalist Change Union (UCN).
- Fritz García-Gallont (VP: Enrique Godoy García Granados) for the Unionist Party (PU) both mayors of the capital.
- Alejandro Giammattei (VP: Alfredo Vila Girón) for the Grand National Alliance (GANA). Giammattei served as director of the national prison service under GANA president Óscar Berger.
- Pablo Monsanto (VP: Mariano Portillo Lemus) for the New Nation Alliance (ANN).
- Rigoberta Menchú (VP: Luis Fernando Montenegro) for the Encounter for Guatemala (EG) party. Menchú is a K'iche' Maya and Nobel Peace Prize laureate. Press reports in late August reported that she had withdrawn from the race because of financial constraints and low levels of support; these reports were false.
- Otto Pérez Molina (VP: Ricardo Castillo Sinibaldi) for the Patriotic Party. Pérez Molina is a retired army general who was active in the Civil War.
- Luis Rabbé (VP: Haroldo Quej Chen) for the Guatemalan Republican Front (FRG)
- Héctor Rosales (VP: Carlos Pérez Rodríguez) for Authentic Integral Development (DIA).
- Miguel Ángel Sandoval (VP: Walda Barrios Ruiz) for Guatemalan National Revolutionary Unity–MAIZE (URNG–MAIZ).
- Eduardo Suger (VP: Erwin Lobos Ríos) for the Social Action Centre (CASA).

== Opinion polls ==
Pollster	Date	Colom	Pérez	Giammattei	Menchú	Suger	Undecided
Siglo XXI	November 2007	47.4	52.6	–	–	–	–
BGC	November 2007	48.0	52.0	–	–	–	–
Prensa Libre	November 2007	47.0	53.0	–	–	–	–
El Periódico	November 2007	39.4	35.1	–	–	–	25.5
El Periódico	October 2007	37.3	39.8	–	–	–	22.9
Siglo XXI	October 2007	46.2	53.8	–	–	–	–
Prensa Libre	October 2007	45.6	54.4	–	–	–	–
Prensa Latina	September 2007	34.7	26.8	13.3	–	–	–
Siglo XXI	September 2007	41.4	39.3	9.5	5	–	–
Prensa Libre	September 2007	31.7	31.8	14.6	3.1	4.5	27.6
El Periódico	August 2007	30.7	27.7	10.5	5.7	1.7	16.7
Prensa Libre	August 2007	22	17.5	7.67	2.42	3.17	28.83
El Periódico	July 2007	33	23.1	8.9	5.5	–	18.5
Prensa Libre	July 2007	21.33	14.42	8.17	2.42	2.5	37.92
El Periódico	June 2007	28	13.2	5.8	6.7	–	33.4
Prensa Libre	June 2007	20.75	12.25	8.17	1.5	1	–
El Periódico	May 2007	25.9	15.3	5.6	6.2	–	36
Prensa Libre	May 2007	20.6	11.4	7.1	2.9	1.5	–
El Periódico	April 2007	28.6	10.4	6.3	5.6	–	42.3
Prensa Libre	April 2007	26.5	10	9.6	2.75	1.25	–
El Periódico	January 2007	34.6	15.9	0.2	1.4	–	29.8
Prensa Libre	January 2007	21.23	10.52	7.54	2.18	0.60	–

== Results ==
=== President ===
Around 60% of the voting public participated in the 9 September first-round vote. However, no candidate secured more than 50% of the vote, and so a run-off election was held between Álvaro Colom of the National Unity of Hope (UNE) and former Army General Otto Pérez Molina of the Patriotic Party (PP) on 4 November 2007.

The ruling Grand National Alliance (GANA), after placing third in the first-round vote, declined to endorse either Colom or Pérez Molina for the second round.

With 97.23% of the vote counted in the second round, Colom was declared the winner with just over 52 percent.

Candidate	Running mate	Party	First round		Second round	
Candidate	Running mate	Party	Votes	%	Votes	%
Álvaro Colom	Rafael Espada	National Unity of Hope	926,236	28.25	1,449,533	52.81
Otto Pérez Molina	Ricardo Castillo Sinibaldi	Patriotic Party	771,813	23.54	1,295,108	47.19
Alejandro Giammattei	Alfredo Vila Girón	Grand National Alliance	565,017	17.23		
Eduardo Suger	Erwin Lobos Ríos	Social Action Centre	244,373	7.45		
Luis Rabbé	Haroldo Quej Chen	Guatemalan Republican Front	239,204	7.30		
Mario Estrada	Mario Torres Marroquín	National Change Union	103,695	3.16		
Rigoberta Menchú	Luis Fernando Montenegro	Encuentro por Guatemala	100,365	3.06		
Fritz García Gallont	Enrique Godoy García Granados	Unionist Party	95,280	2.91		
Óscar Castañeda	Roger Valenzuela	National Advancement Party	83,369	2.54		
Miguel Ángel Sandoval	Walda Barrios Ruiz	Guatemalan National Revolutionary Unity	70,208	2.14		
Manuel Conde Orellana	Juan Francisco Manrique	Democratic Union	24,893	0.76		
Pablo Monsanto	Mariano Portillo Lemus	New Nation Alliance	19,640	0.60		
Héctor Rosales	Carlos Pérez Rodríguez	Authentic Integral Development	18,395	0.56		
Vinicio Cerezo Blandón	Pablo Ramírez Rivas	Guatemalan Christian Democracy	16,461	0.50		
Total			3,278,949	100.00	2,744,641	100.00
Valid votes			3,278,949	90.68	2,744,641	95.06
Invalid/blank votes			336,918	9.32	142,565	4.94
Total votes			3,615,867	100.00	2,887,206	100.00
Registered voters/turnout			5,990,029	60.36	5,990,029	48.20
Source: TSE, TSE

=== Congress ===
The National Unity of Hope (UNE) made huge gains in the election, gaining 20 seats. The Patriotic Party (PP), which ran independent of the Grand National Alliance (GANA), won 29 seat, while GANA won 37 seats.

Graph of the party split among 158 seats.
Party	National			District			Total seats	+/–
Party	Votes	%	Seats	Votes	%	Seats	Total seats	+/–
National Unity of Hope	720,285	22.84	8	705,300	22.17	44	52	+20
Grand National Alliance	521,600	16.54	6	552,976	17.38	31	37	–10
Patriotic Party	493,791	15.66	6	516,287	16.23	23	29	New
Guatemalan Republican Front	306,166	9.71	3	304,255	9.56	11	14	–29
Encuentro por Guatemala	194,809	6.18	2	135,934	4.27	2	4	New
Unionist Party	192,295	6.10	2	210,750	6.63	4	6	–1
Social Action Centre	154,001	4.88	1	148,353	4.66	4	5	New
National Advancement Party	143,268	4.54	1	164,743	5.18	2	3	–14
National Change Union	128,109	4.06	1	144,747	4.55	4	5	New
Guatemalan National Revolutionary Unity	112,249	3.56	1	100,179	3.15	1	2	0
Authentic Integral Development	45,082	1.43	0	47,952	1.51	0	0	–1
Democratic Union	44,359	1.41	0	47,418	1.49	1	1	–1
New Nation Alternative	43,148	1.37	0	46,248	1.45	0	0	–6
Front for Democracy	28,604	0.91	0	25,784	0.81	0	0	New
Guatemalan Christian Democracy	25,450	0.81	0	21,192	0.67	0	0	–1
Bienestar Nacional				8,921	0.28	0	0	New
Total	3,153,216	100.00	31	3,181,039	100.00	127	158	0
Valid votes	3,153,216	87.45		3,181,039	88.03			
Invalid/blank votes	452,503	12.55		432,380	11.97			
Total votes	3,605,719	100.00		3,613,419	100.00			
Registered voters/turnout	5,990,029	60.20		5,990,029	60.32			
Source: TSE, IFES
