= 1944 presidential election =

1944 presidential election may refer to:

- 1944 United States presidential election
- 1944 Guatemalan presidential election
- July 1944 Guatemalan presidential election
- 1944 Salvadoran presidential election
- 1944 Icelandic presidential election
