= María Arzú =

Guatemalan businessperson

- Born: 1976 (age 49–50); Guatemala City, Guatemala
- Political party: Unionist Party (since 2002); National Advancement Party (1989−2002)
- Parents: Álvaro Arzú Irigoyen (father); Silvia García-Granados (mother)

María Arzú García-Granados (born 1976) is a Guatemalan businessperson. Arzú is the third daughter of the former President of Guatemala and mayor of Guatemala City Álvaro Arzú Irigoyen. She is the only member of the Arzú family that maintains a low profile before public opinion.
