= Sylvia García Granados =

Guatemalan educator and businesswoman (born 1946)

- Born: 4 October 1946 (age 79); Guatemala City
- Parent(s): Raúl García-Granados; Enriqueta García-Granados

Sylvia García-Granados de Garay (born 4 October 1946) is a Guatemalan educator and businesswoman. She was the first wife of the former president of Guatemala and mayor of Guatemala City Álvaro Arzú Irigoyen, they married in 1961, having three children: Roberto, Diego and María. Arzú and García divorced in 1981. García Granados remarried in 1986 with Gregorio Valdés O'Conell, with whom she had two daughters.
