= Gran Alianza Nacional =

Gran Alianza Nacional can refer to:

- Grand National Alliance (Dominican Republic)
- Grand National Alliance (Guatemala)
