= 2005 Guatemalan protests =

The 2005 Guatemalan protests were mass street protests and violent anti-United States of America protests after the president Óscar Berger signed the Central America Free Trade Agreement with the United States of America in March-April 2005.

== Protests ==
Protests occurred against it, and the opposition vowed to step up protests calling for the resignation of Óscar Berger. The protesters claimed it will harm farmers and businesses from running, and sparked nation-wide protests, leaving police to disperse crowds of protesters in Guatemala City. Demonstrations intensified on the 4th day of daily street protests, when nonviolent demonstrations turned violent after protesters banged pots and pelted stones at the Riot police in Guatemala City, who responded with killing one protester.

Weeks of street protests swelled. The protesters want a referendum on the Central American Free Trade Agreement (Cafta), as well as the resignation of the interior minister and police chief. One more protester was killed during the sixth day of protests after Riot police used tear gas and water cannon to dispel the marchers, some of whom were throwing rocks and bottles at them. The participants in the protest movement and street demonstrations was indigenous farmers, trade unions and students.

== See also ==
- Guatemalan Civil War
