= Álvaro Colom =

President of Guatemala from 2008 to 2012

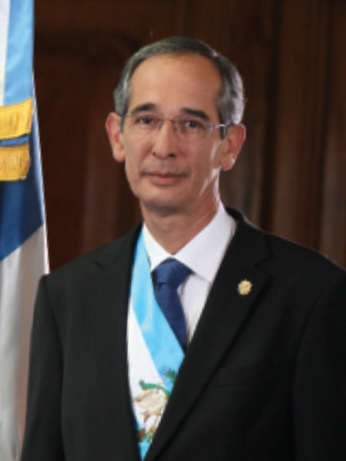
- Official portrait, 2008

47th President of Guatemala
- In office 14 January 2008 – 14 January 2012
- Vice President: Rafael Espada
- Preceded by: Óscar Berger
- Succeeded by: Otto Pérez Molina

General Secretary of the National Unity of Hope
- In office 20 May 2003 – 14 April 2007
- Preceded by: Position established
- Succeeded by: Jairo Flores

Personal details
- Born: Álvaro Colom Caballeros; 15 June 1951 Guatemala City, Guatemala
- Died: 23 January 2023 (aged 71) Guatemala City, Guatemala
- Party: UNE
- Spouses: Patricia Szarata (m. 1971; died 1977) Karen Steele (divorced) Sandra Torres (m. 2002; div. 2011)
- Children: 3
- Education: University of San Carlos of Guatemala
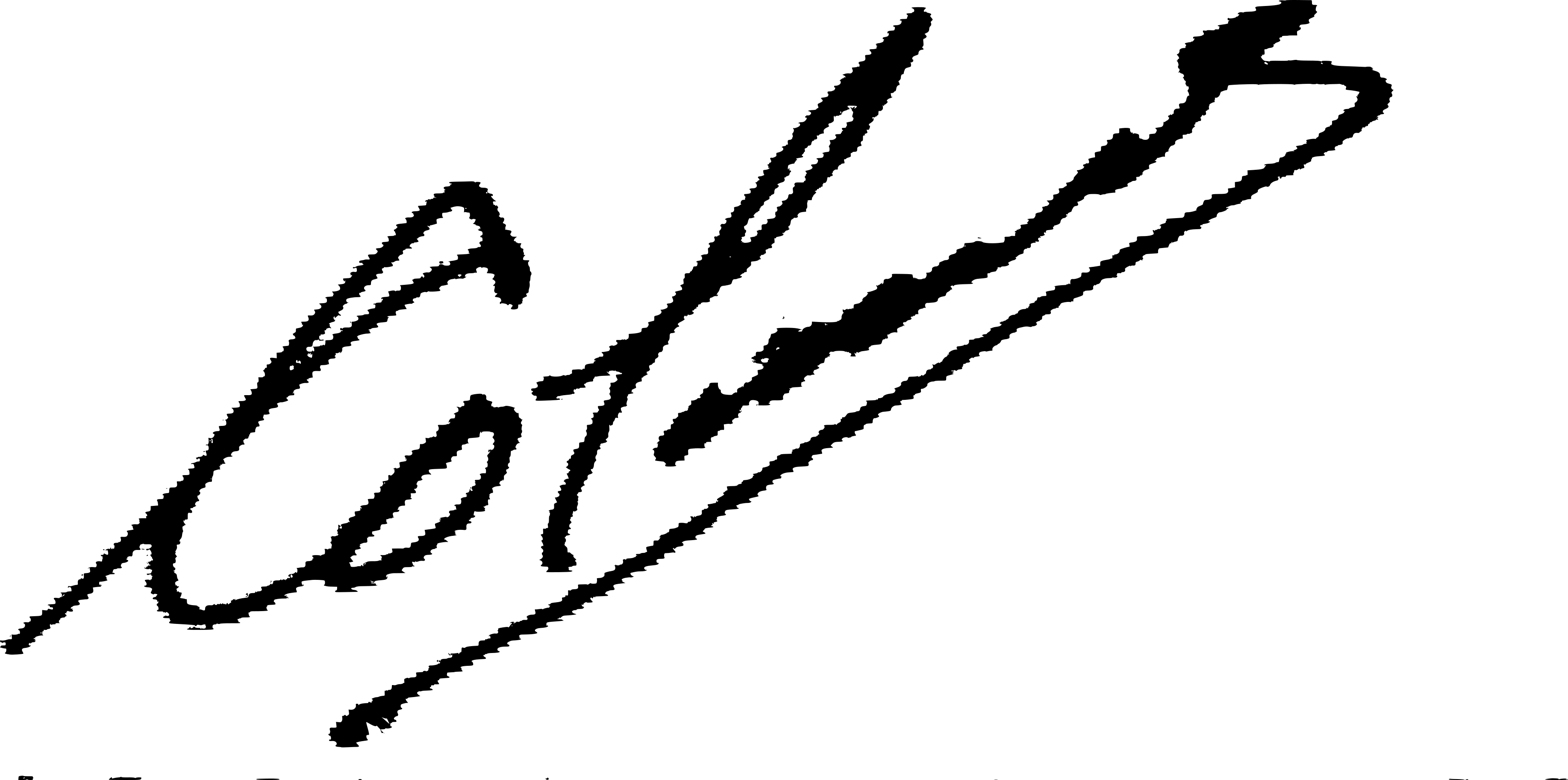
- Signature

Álvaro Colom Caballeros (Spanish: [ˈalβaɾo koˈlon]; 15 June 1951 – 23 January 2023) was a Guatemalan engineer, businessman, and politician who served as the 47th president of Guatemala from 2008 to 2012, as well as the General-Secretary of the political party, National Unity of Hope (UNE).

== Early years ==
Colom was born in Guatemala City on 15 June 1951 to Antonio Colom Argueta and Yolanda Caballeros Ferraté; he was the fourth of five siblings. His uncle, Manuel Colom, was mayor of Guatemala City between 1970 and 1974 and was killed by the military in 1979.

He attended primary and high school at the private Catholic educational institution of Liceo Guatemala and later revealed that he considered entering a seminary. Colom began his career in industrial engineering at the Universidad de San Carlos (USAC), graduating in 1974 and taught in the Faculty of Engineering between 1975 and 1977.

Colom then became a businessman involved in various of businesses, especially in the textile sector. Following the devastating earthquake of 1976, Colom launched hundreds of small businesses in the affected rural areas, an action that was praised by the population. In 1977, Colom became a member of the Chamber of Industry of Guatemala, assuming the leadership of the Apparel and Textile Commission, and the Advisory Council of the Trade Association of Exporters of Non-Traditional Products (AGEXPRONT). Five years later, in 1982, he was appointed member of the Board of Directors of AGEXPRONT, of which he was elected vice president in 1990.

With the recovery of democracy in 1986, Colom expanded his business, achieving a notoriety that allowed him to approach political circles. During this period, he founded the companies Roprisma, Intraexsa, and Grupo Mega.

=== Political beginnings ===
With the accession of Jorge Serrano Elías to the presidency of Guatemala, Colom was appointed Vice Minister of Economy in January 1991 and, in June of that year, Serrano appointed him executive director of the National Fund for Peace (FONAPAZ), gaining prominence by managing the situation of refugees in Mexico fleeing the civil war and the development of rural communities during the negotiation of the Peace Accords with the guerrilla formation, the Guatemalan National Revolutionary Unity (URNG).

In 1996, the National Council of Mayan Elders named him "bridge man with the Western world," being invested with the attributes of a Mayan priest, one of the most important forms of recognition by the Mayan people. During this period, Colom also participated in the creation of the Guatemalan Social Investment Fund (FIS) and the Guatemalan Indigenous Development Fund (FODIGUA).

In April 1997, months after the signing of the Firm and Lasting Peace Accords between the government of Álvaro Arzú and the URNG to end the civil war, Arzú dismissed him as executive director of FONAPAZ. Colom soon became an advisor to the Peace Secretariat (SEPAZ) and executive director of the Presidential Unit for Legal Assistance and Land Conflict Resolution (CONTIERRA). In 1999, he was a member of the board of directors of the Foundation for Analysis and Development (FADES) and became vice-dean of the Faculty of Economics of Rafael Landívar University.

Following these accords, the URNG forged the center-left coalition with Authentic Integral Development and Unidad de la Izquierda Democrática (UNID). Although Colom did not have much in common with the revolutionaries, instead considered a moderate progressive in his ideology, he was selected by that coalition on 22 April 1999 as a candidate for the presidential elections of November that year. His running mate was Vitalino Similox, and the coalition achieved only 12.3% of the votes, coming in at third place.

Colom left the coalition in the fall of 2000 after entering into a dispute with its members and, together with several deputies, founded the National Unity of Hope (UNE) party. In March and April 2002, Colom co-led the Movimiento Cívico por Guatemala, a signature-gathering campaign to demand the resignation of President Alfonso Portillo and his vice president Juan Francisco Reyes, accused in a corruption case. On 1 June 2003, he was proclaimed UNE's candidate for the 2003 Guatemalan general election, with conservative Fernando Andrade Díaz-Durán as his vice president candidate. In his electoral program, he presented policies that prioritized health care for the most vulnerable, the schooling of infants, the defense of comprehensive public security in particular, the creation of 200,000 jobs, and the abolition of the Tax on Commercial and Agricultural Enterprises (IEMA). In the first round of the elections Colom won second place, after Óscar Berger, acquiring 26.4% of the vote. In the second round, which took place on 28 December, he received 45.9% of the vote but did not win the election.

== Presidency (2008–2012) ==
On 6 May 2007, the UNE National Assembly proclaimed Colom a presidential candidate and selected José Rafael Espada as the vice-presidential candidate to face Otto Pérez Molina. The polls were favorable, and the UNE was, at the time, the party with the most militants in the country. Among the measures of his electoral program, they highlighted the commitment to reduce the number of deputies to 60 or 75, not to raise taxes, to fight against tax evasion, to strengthen the power of the municipalities, to restructure the Army in accordance with the peace agreements, to convene a fiscal pact, to promote a program of infant and primary education, to build 200,000 public housing units, and to reduce the rate of crime in the country with "intelligence." The electoral campaign was rocked by the worst episode of political violence in Guatemala's history, with at least 50 people killed.

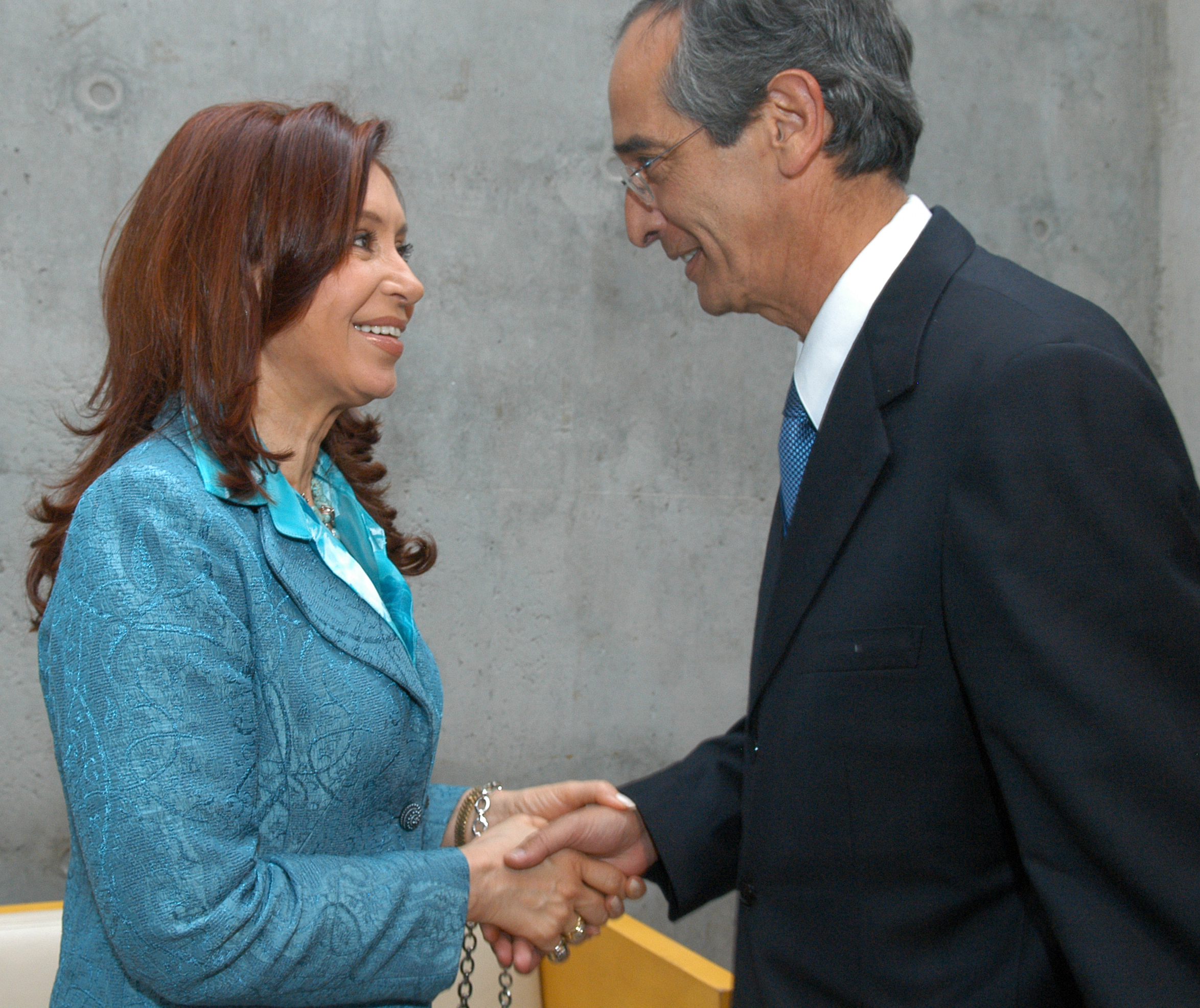
Colom with Cristina Fernández de Kirchner, 9 November 2007.

He was one of the two candidates to reach the second round of the 2007 presidential election on 9 September 2007, along with Partido Patriota candidate Otto Pérez Molina, after winning 27% of the votes. The second round took place on 4 November with low turnout. At 10:00 p.m. local time on election night, Colom was declared the newly elected president by over five percentage points, 52.7% to 47.3%, with over 96% of polling places counted. He became the first leftist president to be elected in recent Guatemalan history.

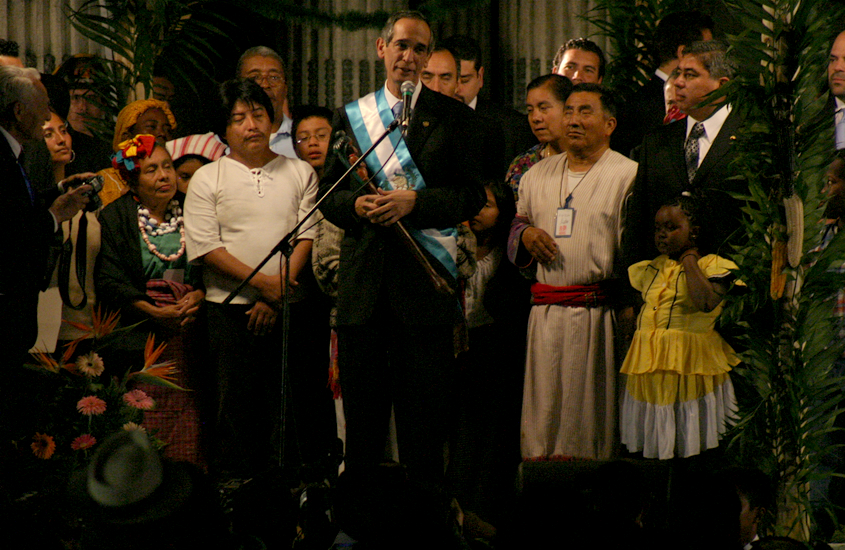
Inauguration of Álvaro Colom, 14 January 2008.

Colom's first message called for negotiations so the government could be a "national conciliation." Colom was sworn in on 14 January 2008. On 12 February of that year, the Congress of the Republic approved the presidential power to pardon death row inmates, recovering the death penalty that was suspended a few years earlier. Colom vetoed this law in March, asserting that this penalty meant "condemning us to another greater death penalty." But Colom stated that he would not pardon those sentenced to death out of respect for the country's laws, although the option to do so was granted in 2008.

On 4 September 2008, Colom ordered the Army to control the National Palace and the National Palace of Culture after finding seven recording devices and two hidden cameras in his private office. On 22 September of that year, he named Marlene Raquel Blanco Lapola as the first woman director of the Policía Nacional Civil. On 22 December 2008, Colom dismissed Minister of Defence Marco Tulio García Franco and the entire military leadership in a reshuffle motivated by his intention to modernize the Army and to strengthen and harmonize the relations between the government and the Armed Forces.

The death on 10 May 2009 of lawyer Rodrigo Rosenberg Marzano put Colom's presidency in check. Rosenberg had made a video public days before in which he warned that if he appeared dead, it was the responsibility of Colom and first lady Sandra Torres. The lawyer began investigating the murders of businessman Khalil Musa and his daughter Marjorie and concluded that he could have been killed because he could uncover a corruption case involving Colom and other authorities.

Protesters erupted in Guatemala City, and opponents urged President Colom to step down from office. President Colom appeared on national television to reject Rosenberg's accusations and called for both the United Nations and the FBI to investigate. Colom also assured the public that he was not going to resign. In an interview with CNN Español, Colom asserted the Rosenberg video was "completely fake," thus challenging early reports from the International Commission against Impunity in Guatemala (CICIG), which validated its authenticity. The International Commission against Impunity in Guatemala ruled in January 2010 that Rosenberg planned his death with the intention of bringing about profound change in Guatemala, thus failing to prove any involvement of Colom.

Amid a food crisis that caused the death of at least 25 children and affected 54,000 families, Colom declared a state of public calamity on 8 September 2009 to address the crisis with government and international aid.

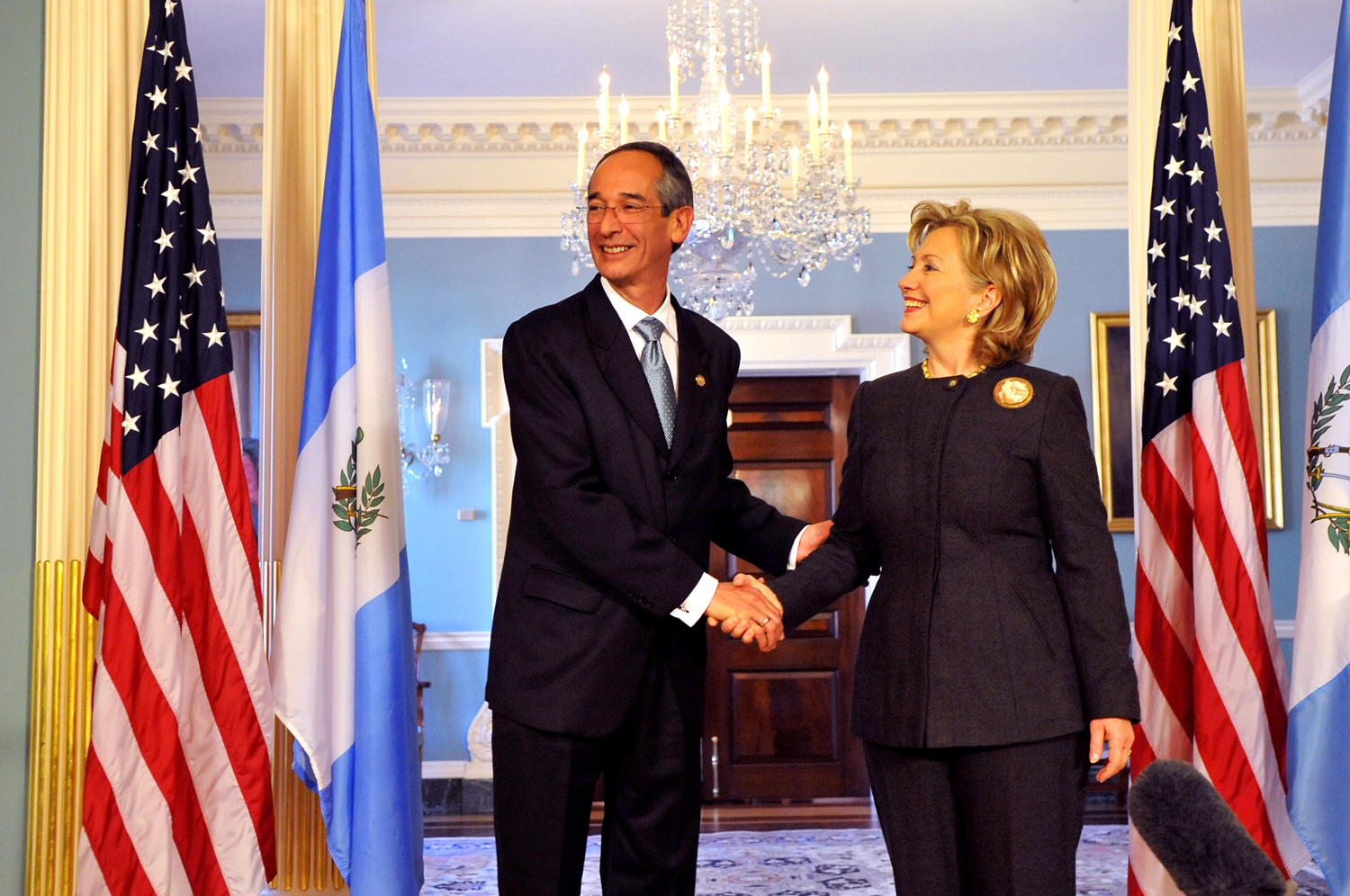
President Colom with US Secretary of State Hillary Clinton in Washington D.C., February 2010.

After the eruption of the Pacaya volcano on 29 May 2010, which caused two deaths, Colom declared a state of emergency around the volcano. The emergency was extended on 30 May to the whole territory after the passage of the devastating tropical storm Agatha the day before.

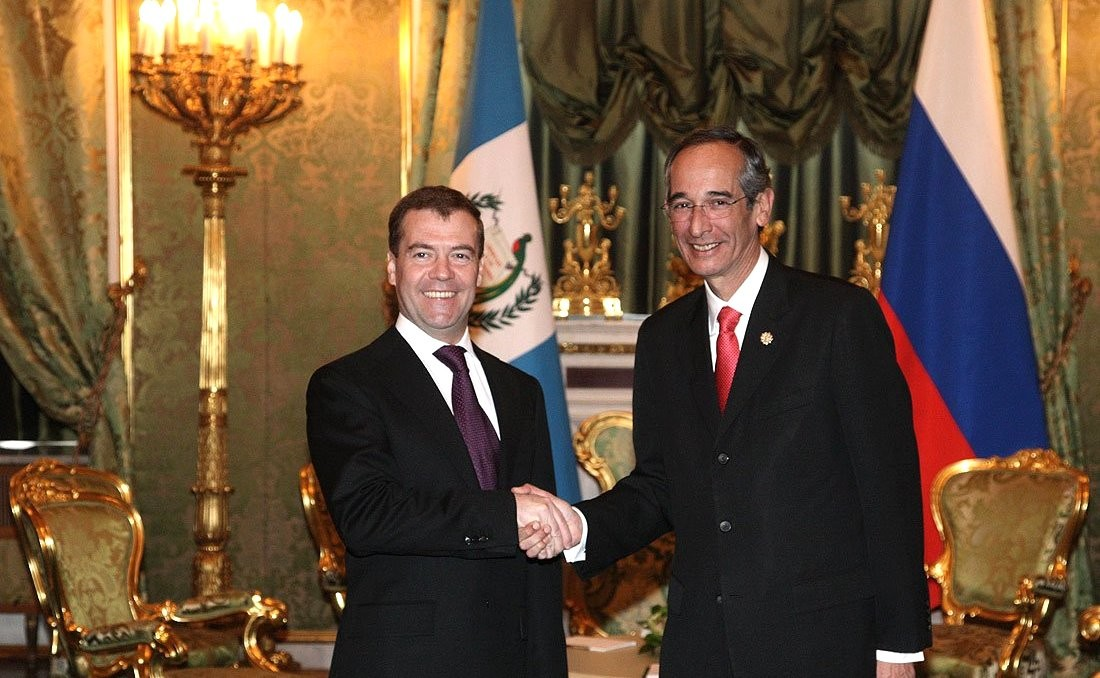
With Russian President Dmitry Medvedev on Moscow Kremlin, 22 March 2010

In 2010, he appointed Helen Mack Chang, a noted human rights activist, to investigate police corruption and make recommendations for changes. She indicated that their low pay and poor working conditions made them open to influence and needed to be addressed.

As president, Colom expanded social programs and access to health, education, and social security. These contributed to a rise in the living standards of the Guatemalan poor. He also tackled the growing influence of Mexican drug cartels, especially the Zetas, and, working with the attorney general through the anti-corruption commission, succeeded in arresting some of the country's most violent criminals.

He also highlighted his government's gestures towards Indigenous peoples. He was considered one of the few white politicians "allied" with the Mayans and used the Mayan calendar daily, raising the flag representing the Guatemalan indigenous peoples over the National Palace.

His presidency ended on 14 January 2012, with the inauguration of Otto Pérez Molina after his victory in the 2011 presidential election and Colom's ineligibility for reelection. Colom left the presidency with a 95.83% disapproval rating of his administration.

== Post-presidency ==
On 20 January 2012, Colom became a member of the Central American Parliament, an office he held until 2016.

Colom headed the observation mission of the Organization of American States to the Colombian peace agreement referendum of 2016.

The U.S. government included Álvaro Colom on 1 July 2021 on the Engel List, which would allow the U.S. Congress to sanction him.

== Judicial cases ==
On 2 March 2004, after months of accusations, Colom was formally charged by the Prosecutor's Office with the crime of money laundering concerning the case of the "looting" of the Comptroller General of Accounts. On 11 March, he acknowledged before the Prosecutor's Office having been financed with the amounts identified by the NGO Amigos en Acción, but denied having any responsibility for the embezzlement of public funds.

On 9 August 2005, the Tenth Criminal Court of First Instance exonerated him of the money laundering charge but indicted him for the charge of improper concealment and imposed bail of 50,000 quetzals, which he later deposited, to avoid pre-trial detention. He appealed to the First Chamber of the Criminal Court of Appeals, which ruled in his favor on 13 September with the revocation of the indictment for the crime of concealment. On 17 February 2006, Colom requested the court to dismiss the case for money laundering, but on 6 March 2006, the magistrate in charge of the case rejected it. Colom then lashed out against the "political persecution" of which he was a victim.

On 30 October 2015, the Ministry of Environment and Natural Resources filed a criminal complaint against Colom before the Attorney General's Office and other members of his government for signing the extension of the oil contract with Perenco.

=== 2018 arrest ===
On 13 February 2018, Colom was arrested along with all other members of his former Cabinet "as part of a local corruption investigation".

The judge ruled on 1 March that Colom and the twelve other defendants should be prosecuted because the Colom government defrauded the state by illegally granting US$35 million to the Asociación de Empresas de Autobuses Urbanos to install a prepaid Transurbano system without any collateral. He also ordered Colom to be released on bail.

On 3 August 2018, he was released from prison on a 1 million quetzal bail. He was under house arrest at his home in Guatemala City until his death on 23 January 2023.

== Personal life ==
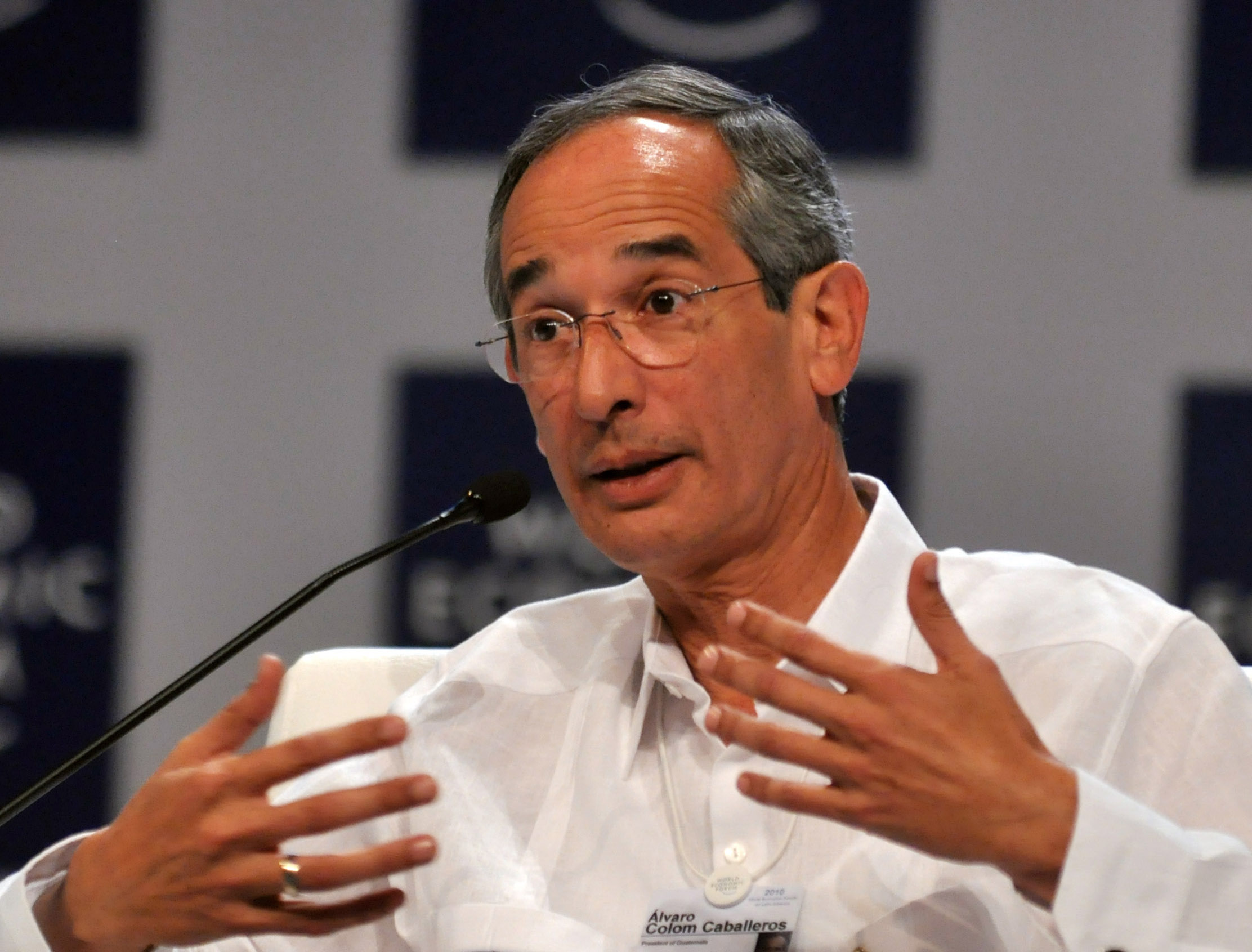
Colom in 2010.

Colom's first wife, Patricia Szarata, died in 1977 after a car accident. With Patricia, he had two children: Antonio Colom Szarata, the bass player of a Guatemalan pop rock band "Viento en Contra," and Patricia. His second marriage was to Karen Steele, with whom Colom had his son Diego. However that marriage ended in divorce. In June 2002, he married Sandra Torres, a mother of four, whom he met during the 1999 election campaign. Torres served as first lady during Colom's presidency until 2011, when the couple divorced so that Torres could run for the 2011 presidential election, as the Constitution prohibits relatives of presidents from running for the same office. A court authorized the divorce on 8 April of that year. Even so, in August 2011 the Constitutional Court rejected Torres' registration as a presidential candidate.

Colom's personality was defined by his pragmatism and conciliatory nature, although not particularly firm in leadership, an aspect that was criticized and often considered by his critics to be hesitant and subject to the energetic character of his wife, Sandra Torres. After a fractured palate contracted in a fall as a child, he had trouble pronouncing the letter r. Colom rejected abortion, homosexual marriage, and drug use.

=== Death ===
On 4 December 2020, Colom's lawyer made public to journalists that Colom had esophageal cancer and was undergoing treatment.

Colom died from esophageal cancer and pulmonary emphysema on 23 January 2023, at age 71 at home in Guatemala City during house arrest. Ten days earlier, he had been started on sedation. The government decreed three days of mourning, beginning on 24 January. That day the funeral took place in the chapel of the Las Flores cemetery in Guatemala City, where he was later buried. A state funeral was not held, as the family refused the request.

== Honors ==
- Order of Brilliant Jade with Grand Cordon (Republic of China, 2008)
- Collar of the Order of the Aztec Eagle (Mexico, 2011)

Party political offices
New political party	General Secretary of the National Unity of Hope; 2003–2007	Succeeded by Jairo Flores
New political party	UNE nominee for President of Guatemala; 2003, 2007	Vacant Title next held by Sandra Torres
Political offices
Preceded by Óscar Berger	President of Guatemala; 2008–2012	Succeeded by Otto Pérez Molina
