= Héctor Fernando Ramírez =

Héctor Fernando Ramírez, better known as Reportero X (Reporter X) died on July 24, 2003, of a heart attack in Guatemala City while being chased by a mob in what is referred to as jueves negro (Black Thursday). He was 61 years old. He had started his career as a radio news reporter. When he died he was a reporter for the TV channel Noti-7, though he was also working for Radio Sonora.

At 08:30 he arrived at an area where Guatemalan Republican Front (FRG) supporters were rioting, and attacking another reporter, Juan Carlos Torres, who worked for El Periódico (The Newspaper). They had stolen Torres' photographic equipment and were spraying him with petrol when Ramírez and other reporters arrived, which allowed Torres to escape. The mob set on the reporters, and while they were running away Ramírez had a heart attack, which instantly killed him.
