= New Nation Alternative =

New Nation Alternative Alternativa Nueva Nación
- Abbreviation: ANN
- Secretary-General: Pablo Monsanto
- Founded: 1999 (Alianza Nueva Nación)
- Registered: 2003
- Dissolved: 2015
- Merger of: DIA, URNG
- Succeeded by: Convergence
- Ideology: Socialism; Progressivism; Anti-imperialism; Indigenismo
- Political position: Left-wing
- National affiliation: Broad Front of the Left (2011)
- Most Seats (2003): 6 / 160

Party flag
- Politics of Guatemala; Political parties; Elections; Flag is the logo of New Nation Alliance

The New Nation Alternative (Alternativa Nueva Nación) was a leftist political party in Guatemala.

In the elections held on 9 November 2003, the party won 4.9% of the popular vote and 6 out of 158 seats.

In the elections held on 9 September 2007, the party secured 1.35% of the votes in the race for national-list deputies and, save for defections, will have no representation in the 2008-12 Congress. In the presidential election of the same day, its candidate Jorge Ismael Soto won 0.59% of the popular vote. Given its lack of representation in Congress and its insufficient percentage of the presidential vote, the party was forced to disband in 2007 in accordance with Guatemalan election law.
