= 2003 Guatemalan general election =

- Presidential election
9 November 2003 (first round); 28 December 2003 (second round)
- Turnout: 57.89% (first round) ▲4.13pp 46.78% (second round) ▲6.41pp
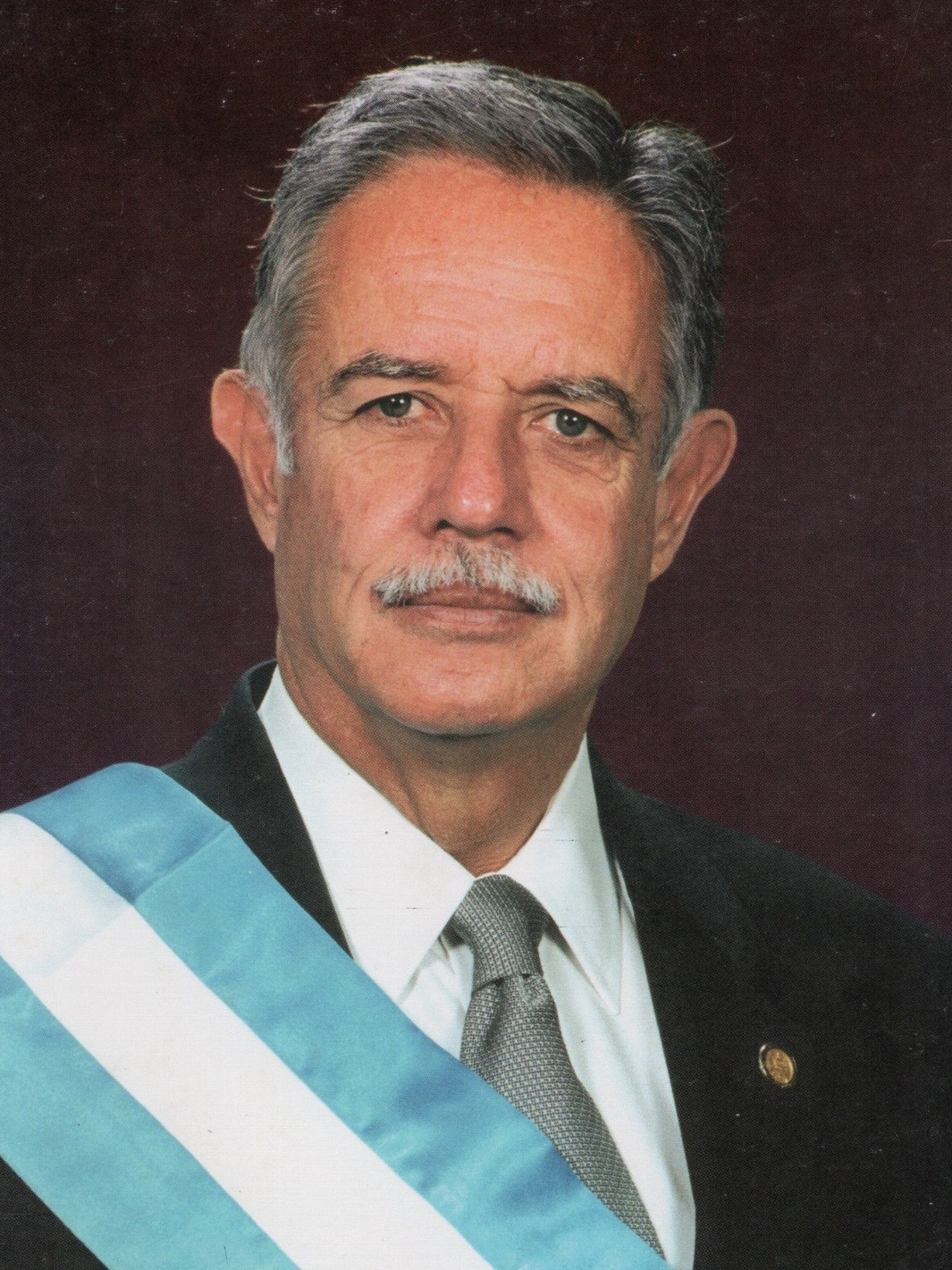

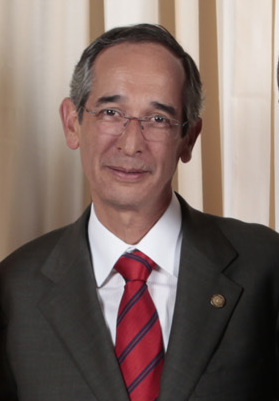
Nominee	Óscar Berger	Álvaro Colom
Party	GANA	UNE
Running mate	Eduardo Stein	Fernando Andrade
Popular vote	1,235,303	1,046,868
Percentage	54.1%	45.9%
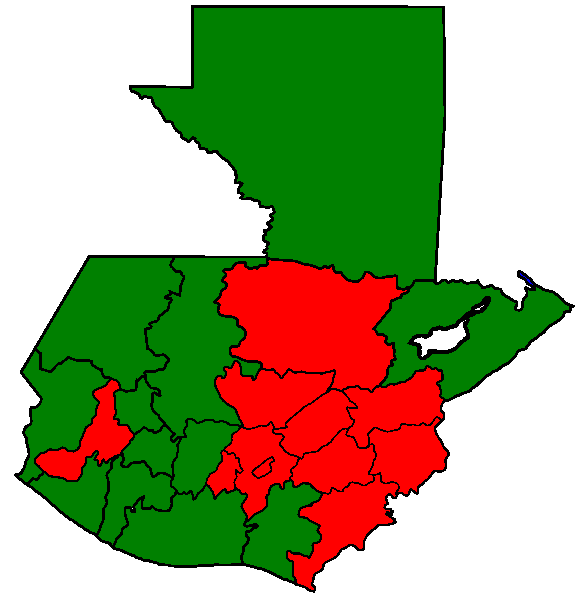
President before election
Alfonso Portillo
FRG
President-elect
Óscar Berger
GANA

General elections were held in Guatemala on 9 November 2003, with a second round of the presidential election held on 28 December. Óscar Berger won the presidential election, representing the Grand National Alliance, a coalition of alliance of the Patriotic Party, the Reform Movement and the National Solidarity Party. The Alliance were also victorious in the Congressional elections, winning 47 of the 158 seats. Voter turnout was 57.9% in the Congressional elections, 58.9% in the first round of the presidential elections and 46.8% in the second.

== Presidential election ==
The ruling Republican Front of Guatemala (FRG) nominated former military ruler Efraín Ríos Montt to succeed outgoing president Alfonso Portillo Cabrera. A constitutional ban on former coup leaders (Ríos Montt during 1982–83) led to strong conflict inside the country, including the besiegement of Guatemala for a day: 24 July 2003, known as jueves negro ("Black Thursday"). In the first round of voting, Ríos Montt came third behind the centrist mayor of Guatemala City, Óscar Berger, and the more left-wing candidate Álvaro Colom.

== Results ==
=== President ===
Candidate	Party	First round		Second round	
Candidate	Party	Votes	%	Votes	%
Óscar Berger	Grand National Alliance	921,233	34.33	1,235,303	54.13
Álvaro Colom	National Unity of Hope	707,578	26.36	1,046,868	45.87
Efraín Ríos Montt	Guatemalan Republican Front	518,328	19.31		
Leonel Eliseo López Rodas	National Advancement Party	224,127	8.35		
Fritz García Gallont	Unionist Party	80,943	3.02		
Rodrigo Asturias	Guatemalan National Revolutionary Unity	69,297	2.58		
Eduardo Suger	Authentic Integral Development	59,774	2.23		
Jacobo Árbenz Vilanova	Guatemalan Christian Democracy	42,186	1.57		
José Angel Lee	Social Participative Democracy	37,505	1.40		
Francisco Arredondo Mendoza	National Union	11,979	0.45		
Manuel Conde Orellana	Social and Political Movement National Change	10,829	0.40		
Total		2,683,779	100.00	2,282,171	100.00
Valid votes		2,683,779	91.37	2,282,171	96.15
Invalid/blank votes		253,390	8.63	91,298	3.85
Total votes		2,937,169	100.00	2,373,469	100.00
Registered voters/turnout		5,073,282	57.89	5,073,282	46.78
Source: Nohlen

=== Congress ===
Party	National			District			Total seats
Party	Votes	%	Seats	Votes	%	Seats	Total seats
Grand National Alliance	620,121	24.30	8	513,529	19.80	32	40
Guatemalan Republican Front	502,470	19.69	7	522,670	20.15	36	43
National Unity of Hope	457,308	17.92	6	424,447	16.36	26	32
National Advancement Party	278,393	10.91	4	297,178	11.46	12	16
Unionist Party	157,893	6.19	2	163,637	6.31	5	7
New Nation Alternative	123,853	4.85	1	142,679	5.50	5	6
Guatemalan National Revolutionary Unity	107,276	4.20	1	104,889	4.04	1	2
Guatemalan Christian Democracy	82,324	3.23	1	85,918	3.31	0	1
Authentic Integral Development	75,295	2.95	1	67,456	2.60	0	1
Democratic Union	55,793	2.19	0	58,277	2.25	2	2
Social Participative Democracy	28,425	1.11	0	30,026	1.16	0	0
Transparency	27,740	1.09	0	24,359	0.94	0	0
Social and Political Movement National Change	18,005	0.71	0	18,384	0.71	0	0
National Union	17,478	0.68	0	14,432	0.56	0	0
Patriotic Party–Reform Movement				65,369	2.52	5	5
Reform Movement–National Solidarity Party				16,127	0.62	1	1
Reformist Movement				12,923	0.50	0	0
DIA–PLP				11,498	0.44	0	0
Patriotic Party–National Solidarity Party				8,997	0.35	2	2
Patriotic Party				5,681	0.22	0	0
Progressive Liberating Party				2,868	0.11	0	0
National Solidarity Party				1,438	0.06	0	0
UN–DIA–ANN				1,336	0.05	0	0
Total	2,552,374	100.00	31	2,594,118	100.00	127	158
Valid votes	2,552,374	86.91		2,594,118	88.34		
Invalid/blank votes	384,562	13.09		342,513	11.66		
Total votes	2,936,936	100.00		2,936,631	100.00		
Registered voters/turnout	5,073,282	57.89		5,073,282	57.88		
Source: Election Passport, Friedenberg
