= Álvaro Arzú =

32nd President of Guatemala

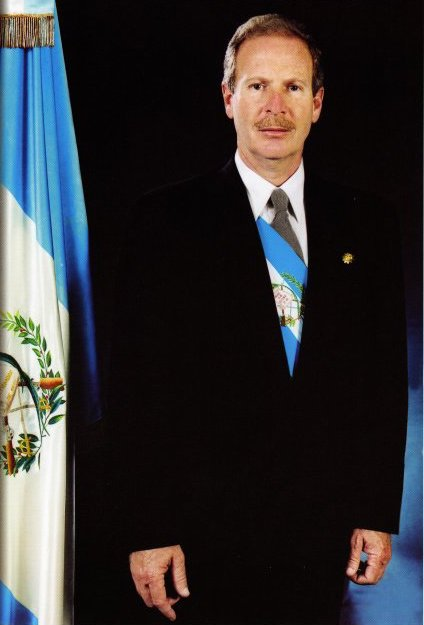
- Official portrait, 1996

44th President of Guatemala
- In office 14 January 1996 – 14 January 2000
- Vice President: Luis Alberto Flores Asturias
- Preceded by: Ramiro de León Carpio
- Succeeded by: Alfonso Portillo

Mayor of Guatemala City
- In office 14 January 2004 – 27 April 2018
- Deputy: Ricardo Quiñónez Lemus
- Preceded by: Fritz García Gallont
- Succeeded by: Ricardo Quiñónez Lemus
- In office 14 January 1986 – 1990
- Preceded by: José Angel Lee; Arturo Saravia
- Succeeded by: Álvaro Heredia; Óscar Berger

Personal details
- Born: Álvaro Enrique Arzú Irigoyen; 14 March 1946 Guatemala City, Guatemala
- Died: 27 April 2018 (aged 72) Guatemala City, Guatemala
- Party: National Advancement Party / Unionist Party
- Spouse(s): Sylvia García Granados (1969–1981); Patricia Escobar de Arzú (1981–2018; his death)
- Children: 5, including Roberto, Diego, María, Álvaro
- Relatives: Dominique Wilson (niece)

Álvaro Enrique Arzú Irigoyen (Spanish: [ˈalβaɾo enˈrike aɾˈsu jɾiˈɣoʎen]; 14 March 1946 – 27 April 2018) was a Guatemalan politician and businessman who served as the 44th president of Guatemala from 1996 to 2000, as well as several terms as Mayor of Guatemala City. The main achievement of his presidency was the signature of a peace accord with the guerrilla group Guatemalan National Revolutionary Unity, which ended Guatemala's 36-year-long civil war.

He was elected Mayor of Guatemala City on six occasions: in 1982, when he declined to take office because of a coup d'état; in 1986; in 2003, after serving as president; in 2007; in 2011 and 2015, for a term that would see him die in office.

== Early career ==
Born in Guatemala City, Arzú studied Social and Legal Sciences at Rafael Landívar University. In 1978 he became director of the Guatemalan Institute of Tourism (INGUAT); he occupied this position until 1981 when he was elected mayor of Guatemala City for the Guatemalan Christian Democracy (DCG) party. But in 1982 there was a military coup d'état and, although the elections were annulled, the military offered him to be the municipal intendent, which he declined. In 1986 he became mayor, after winning the election under the umbrella of the Plan for National Advancement civic committee.

In 1989, the civic committee became the National Advancement Party (PAN). Arzú was their presidential candidate for the 1990 elections, finishing in fourth place with 17.3 percent of the vote. The winner, Jorge Serrano, appointed Arzú as minister for foreign affairs in 1991. However, he resigned later that year in protest against Serrano's decision to normalize relations with Belize, over most of whose territory Guatemala has long-standing claims.

== Presidency (1996–2000) ==
Arzú won the first round of the 1995 general elections in November and then narrowly beat Alfonso Portillo of the Guatemalan Republican Front (FRG, Frente Republicano Guatemalteco) in the second round, which took place in January 1996. He obtained 51.2 percent of the vote.

The main achievement of Arzú's presidency was the signature of a peace accord with the guerrilla group Guatemalan National Revolutionary Unity, which ended Guatemala's 36-year-long civil war. The negotiations had been going on since 1990, and Arzú gave them a vital new impulse when he met the URNG in Mexico on 26 February 1996. A ceasefire followed on 20 March and various peace agreements were signed as the year progressed. On 12 December an accord legalizing the URNG was signed in Madrid. On 18 December Congress passed a law giving a partial amnesty to the combatants, before the final accord for a firm and lasting peace was signed on 29 December.

As part of this peace accord, Arzú's government proposed a series of reforms to the Constitution of Guatemala, including disbanding the Presidential Guard, reducing the armed forces, and recognizing the rights of indigenous communities. However, a 1999 referendum would reject the proposed reforms.

Under Arzú's presidency, there was a significant investment in the country's infrastructure; particularly, the roads were improved, and electric and telephone coverage was increased. As part of this process, several public transportation and utility companies were privatized, which drew heavy criticism due to accusations of irregularities during the process. Some of these companies were the electric utility Empresa Eléctrica de Guatemala (EEGSA), the telephone service provider GUATEL, the national airline Aviateca, and the railway company FEGUA.

Among other challenges faced by Arzú's government was the murder of Archbishop Juan José Gerardi in 1998, which was later attributed to members of the Presidential Guard. Also, the destruction caused by Hurricane Mitch that same year and the increase in the crime rate. Despite this, the gross domestic product grew about 3 percent annually, and inflation was reduced to 5 percent.

Officers close to his government carried out assassinations of activists of social organizations.

== Post-presidency and death ==
After his presidential term, Arzú became a member of the Central American Parliament; he occupied this seat from 2000 to 2004. He was elected for a second term as mayor of Guatemala City in 2003 and was elected again in 2007, 2011, and 2015. His last term was set to finish in 2020.

During this period, Arzú established the Transmetro bus rapid transit system and worked on restoring the historical center of Guatemala City.

In his final years, 2017 and 2018, Arzú crusaded against the United Nations Commissioner of the International Commission against Impunity in Guatemala (CICIG), Iván Velásquez, and against the Attorney General, Thelma Aldana, openly accusing them of carrying out a slow coup d'état against President Morales under the cover of a fight against corruption and impunity. In the meantime, he had come under fire himself. On 27 April 2018, Arzú had a heart attack while playing golf in Guatemala City. He died in hospital later that day.

== Personal life ==
Arzú had three children with his first wife, Sylvia García Granados, and two children with his second wife, Patricia Escobar. His son, Álvaro Arzú Escobar, was president of the Congress of Guatemala. Dominique Wilson is his niece.

He was Guatemala's national squash rackets champion on several occasions. The International Commission Against Impunity in Guatemala (CICIG), a United Nations-backed anti-corruption body, publicly investigated and brought forward allegations suggesting that a third Guatemalan president was involved in corruption or illicit activities as part of its broader efforts to expose high-level corruption in the country’s political leadership.

== Awards ==
- 1996: UNESCO's Félix Houphouët-Boigny Peace Prize
- 1997: During his presidency, the government of Guatemala was awarded Spain's Prince of Asturias Award for International Co-operation.
- Monseñor Leonidas Proaño Human Rights Prize (ALDHU)
- 2005: Ranked third in the World Mayor contest.

Political offices
Preceded by Ramiro de León Carpio	President of Guatemala; 1996–2000	Succeeded by Alfonso Portillo
Preceded by José Angel Lee	Mayor of Guatemala City; 1986–1991	Succeeded by Óscar Berger
Preceded by Fritz García Gallont	Mayor of Guatemala City; 2004–2018	Succeeded by Ricardo Quiñónez Lemus
