= Óscar Berger =

President of Guatemala from 2004 to 2008

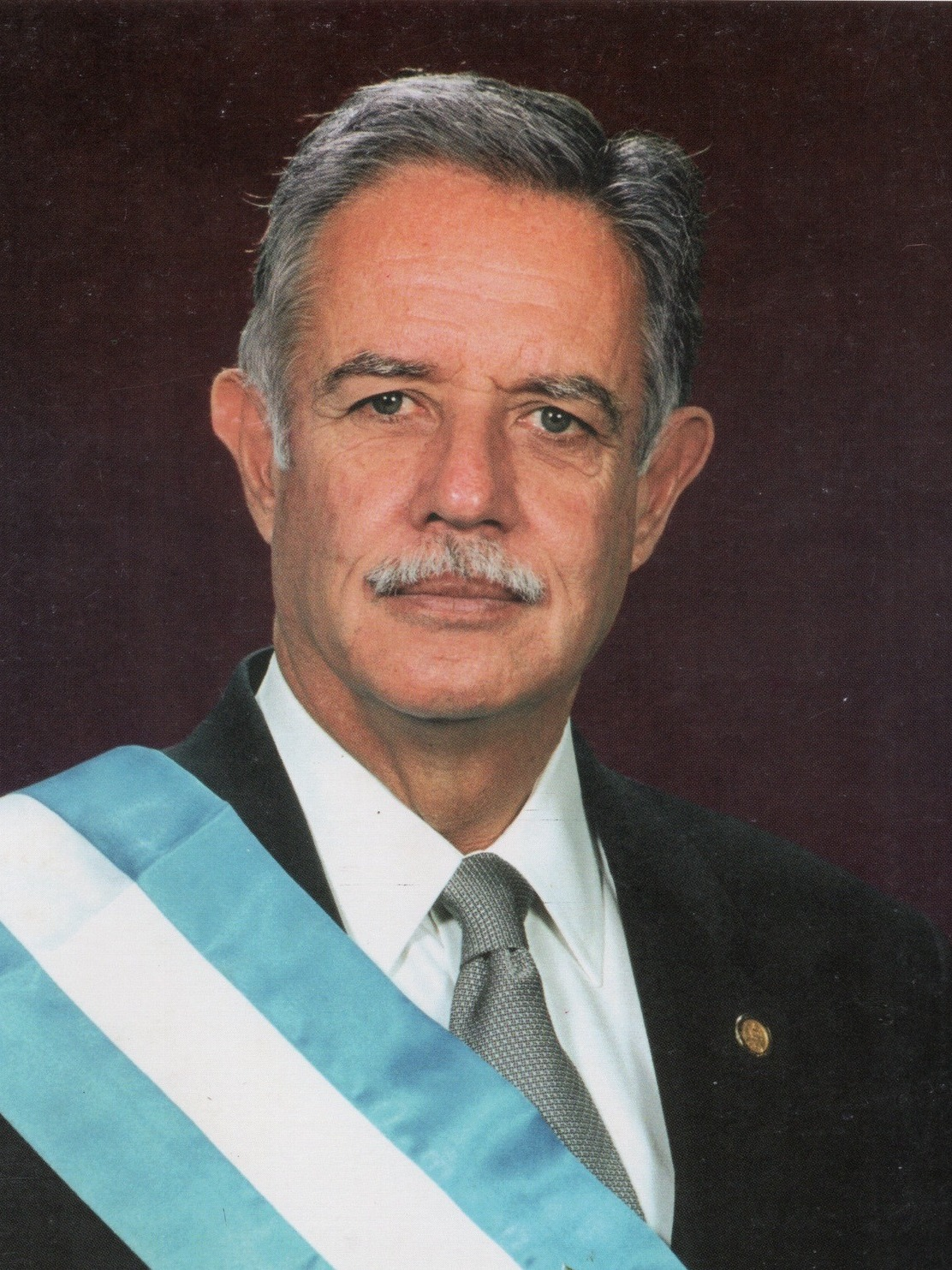
- Official portrait, 2005

46th President of Guatemala
- In office 14 January 2004 – 14 January 2008
- Vice President: Eduardo Stein
- Preceded by: Alfonso Portillo
- Succeeded by: Álvaro Colom

Personal details
- Born: 11 August 1946 (age 80) Guatemala City, Guatemala
- Party: Independent (since 2003)
- Other political affiliations: National Advancement Party (until 2003); Grand National Alliance (2003–2005)
- Spouse: Wendy de Berger
- Children: 5
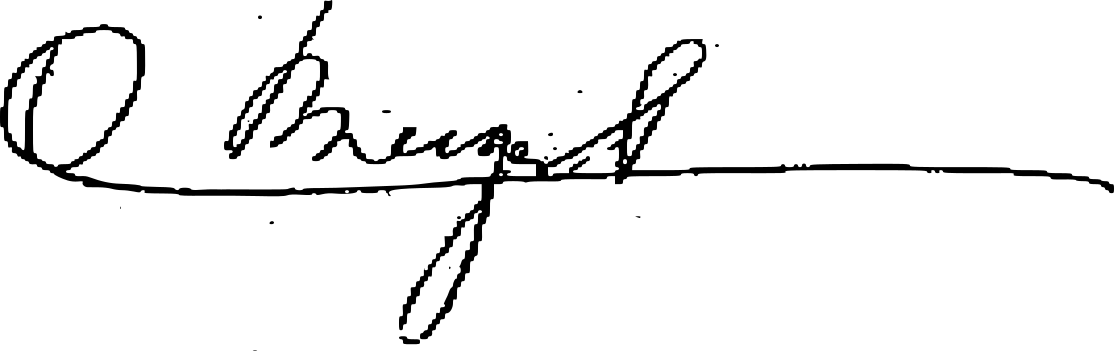
- Signature

Óscar José Rafael Berger Perdomo (Spanish pronunciation: [ˈoskaɾ xoˈse rafaˈel βeɾˈʃe peɾˈðomo]; born 11 August 1946) is a Guatemalan businessman and politician who served as the 46th president of Guatemala from 2004 to 2008. He previously served as mayor of Guatemala City from 1991 to 1999.

== Early years and family ==
Berger was born to an upper-class family with large sugar and coffee holdings. His paternal grandparents were Belgian immigrants. He graduated in law from the private Jesuit Rafael Landívar University.

In 1967, he married Wendy Widmann, also from a land-owning Guatemalan family. He had a son and a grandchild named Juan Pablo Berger.

== Political career ==
In 1985, Berger joined Álvaro Arzú's successful campaign to become mayor of Guatemala City. From January 1991 to June 1999, he was mayor himself. After leaving office, he ran in the 1999 presidential election as the candidate of the National Advancement Party but lost to Alfonso Portillo.

A representative of the industrial and land oligarchy that financed his electoral campaign, Berger was elected with 54.13% of the vote in the presidential election of December 2003, ahead of his rival from the center-left, Alvaro Colom. Only 46% of those registered on the electoral rolls took part in the vote.

Berger's party worked for national reconciliation following the civil war that gripped the country until 1996.

== Mayor of Guatemala City (1991–1999) ==
As university classmates, Berger established a friendship with Álvaro Arzú, with whom they founded the then PAN civic committee, which would later become a political party. With the support of Arzú, Berger won a seat at the Municipal Council of Guatemala City, taking office on 15 January 1986. He would later join different municipal commissions that focused on Sports, Public Health, Agriculture, Livestock, and Food, and also became director of the Municipal Social and Sports Club, one of the most popular soccer clubs in Guatemala.

On 11 May 1989, Berger and Arzú registered the National Advance Party (PAN). The newly formed center-right party would participate and win in the 1990 Guatemalan city mayoral election. Berger would be sworn in as mayor on 15 January 1991 and become re-elected in the 1995 mayoral election.

PAN would also succeed in the 1995 general election, gaining the majority of seats in Congress and qualifying Álvaro Arzú to the second round of the presidential election. Arzú would go on to defeat FRG candidate Alfonso Portillo.

== 1999 and 2003 presidential elections ==
=== 1999 candidacy and election ===
During Arzú's presidential term, Berger expressed his interest in running for the presidency. On 27 June 1999, PAN would formalize his candidacy for the 1999 general election. Accordingly, Berger would step down from his mayoral duties and devote his time to the campaign.

Berger would run a campaign focusing on combatting poverty, increasing the country's wage limit, and being tough on organized crime. However, the populist rhetoric delivered by second-time presidential hopeful Alfonso Portillo would have a greater reach with the Guatemalan populace. Berger would go on to lose the second round of the presidential election; many speculated his loss as a punishment for the arrogance of President Arzú and the questionable ways state corporations were privatized during his mandate.

The electoral loss would cause conflict within the PAN party, which would later have a faction of the party leave to form the Unionist Party. During this time, Berger would break his relationship with Arzú, blaming his lousy governance for his defeat against Portillo's FRG party.

=== 2003 candidacy and election ===
In the spring of 2002, Berger returned to the political arena with a newly formed conservative political coalition called the Great National Alliance (GANA), encompassing the Patriot Party, the Reform Movement (MR), and the National Solidarity Party (PSN). His association with GANA would cause him to be expelled from PAN. Nevertheless, after seeing a significant lead in the country's polls, Berger would accept GANA's presidential nomination.

The beginning of the 2003 presidential race was marked by the unusual registration of Efraín Ríos Montt as a presidential candidate - despite the constitution prohibiting it - and the extortions and assassinations of prominent political leaders. However, Montt would not have the significant votes to go to the second round, making the election a race between Álvaro Colom, leader of the National Unity of Hope (UNE), and Berger. Running on a campaign of political, economic, and social reform and the explicit support of the country's oligarchs, Berger would win the election with 54% of the vote. His coalition would also win 47 seats in Congress.

== Presidency (2004–2008) ==
The inauguration of Óscar Berger as the 46th president took place on 14 January 2004. In his inaugural speech, Berger promised to continue strengthening government institutions, defend the rule of law, and fight against the impunity of corrupt and violent actors. At the beginning of his presidency, persecution began against former officials of the Portillo administration, which raised a high expectation that the government would dismantle the corrupt structure of the State. However, investigations against the officials halted, which led to Berger's approval ratings plummeting.

=== Domestic policy ===
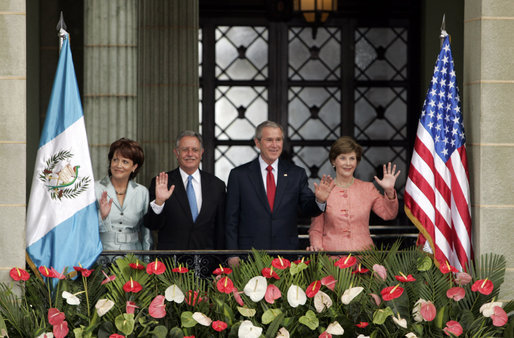
Visit of U.S. President George W. Bush to Guatemala on March 12, 2007. From left to right: Wendy de Berger, first lady of Guatemala, President Berger, President Bush and Laura Bush, first lady of the United States.

Berger authorized the construction of several highways in Guatemala and the remodeling of the Aurora International Airport. He undertook a reform of the army, recognized the responsibility of the state for war crimes, and appointed Rigoberta Menchu, a figure of the pacifist and indigenous movement, as special ambassador to the presidency. Most of the members of his government, however, were from the oligarchy.

Serious events would also occur that exposed the degree of corruption of several of Berger's officials, such as the PARLACEN Case, the Case of the seizure of the Pavón prison, the bankruptcy of the Coffee and Commerce banks, and the million-dollar robbery at the Aurora Airport. Additionally, Berger would pursue a repressive policy towards the peasant movement. It is in this context that the massacre of Nueva Linda took place in August 2004, in which the police killed nine peasants. A CICIG report published in 2010 accused the government of Óscar Berger of carrying out "social cleansing" operations and ordering extrajudicial executions. Philip Alston, a rapporteur to the United Nations, had already, in 2007, denounced social cleansing operations involving the Guatemalan government.

==== CICIG ====
On 12 December 2006, the United Nations and the Government of Guatemala signed an agreement that would institute the International Commission Against Impunity in Guatemala (CICIG), which, after the approval of the Constitutional Court in May 2007, was subsequently ratified by Congress on 1 August 2007. Thus, the CICIG emerged as an independent international body whose purpose was to support the Public Prosecutor's Office, the National Civil Police, and other State institutions in the investigation of the crimes committed by members of the illegal security forces and clandestine security devices, and in general in the actions that tend to the dismantling of these groups.

==== Hurricane Stan ====
Satellite image of Hurricane Stan taken on 4 October 2005, shortly before making landfall in Central America.

In October 2005, Guatemala suffered one of the worst natural disasters in its history. The passage through Central America of Hurricane Stan, whose consequences would be even more virulent than those produced years ago by Mitch, sowed chaos in the country, causing hundreds of fatalities and missing persons, as well as an incalculable number of victims.

Such was the degree of destruction generated that Berger declared the "state of public calamity." Berger would also remark in regards to the damage done by Stan: "It's not so bad, poor people are used to living like this."

=== Foreign policy ===
In March 2006, Berger would ratify the Central American Free Trade Agreement (CAFTA).

In June 2006, the Berger administration, and the governments of El Salvador, Honduras, and Nicaragua, signed the Central America-4 Free Mobility Agreement, which authorized the free movement of their citizens across borders between the four signatory states without any restrictions or checks.

== Post-presidency ==
Berger's presidency ended on 14 January 2008, upon the inauguration of his successor, Álvaro Colom. The Colom administration would accuse Berger of leaving a floating debt of more than 4 billion quetzals.

== See also ==
- Politics of Guatemala
- List of political parties in Guatemala

Political offices
Preceded by Alfonso Portillo	President of Guatemala; 2004–2008	Succeeded by Álvaro Colom
