= National Advancement Party =

National Advancement Party Partido de Avanzada Nacional
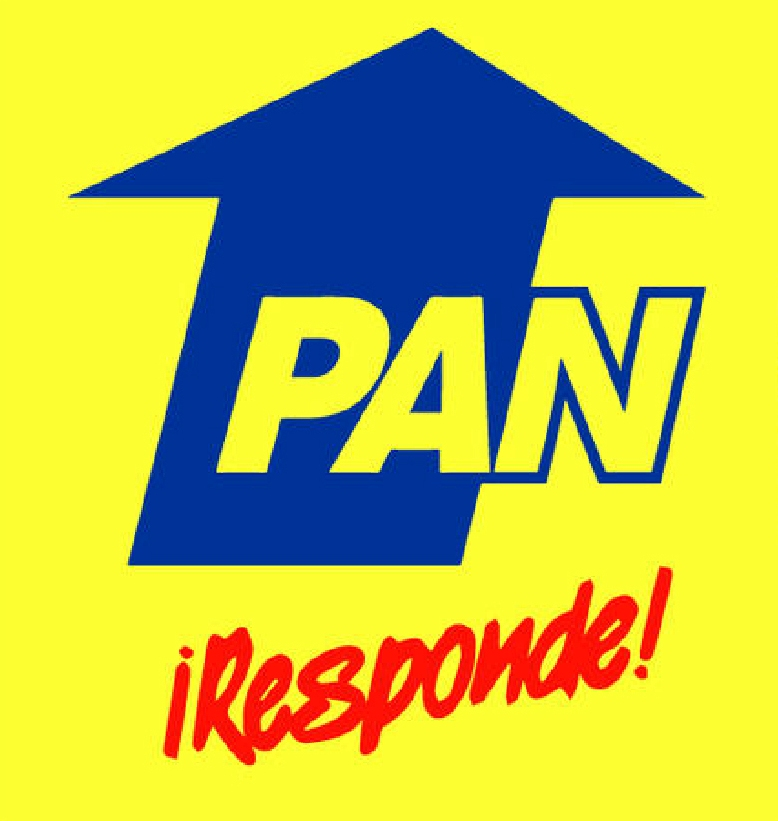
- Leader: Manuel Conde Orellana
- Founder: Álvaro Arzú
- Founded: 1989
- Dissolved: 8 January 2024
- Ideology: Conservatism; Historical (under Álvaro Arzú): Neoliberalism; Progressivism; Pro-privatization
- Political position: Right-wing
- International affiliation: International Democrat Union
- Colors: Yellow
- Seats in Congress: 0 / 160

Website
- www.pan-gt.com
- Politics of Guatemala; Political parties; Elections; Also described as centre-right and far-right

The National Advancement Party (Spanish: Partido de Avanzada Nacional) was a conservative political party in Guatemala. It was founded in 1989.

In the 1990 and 1995 elections its presidential candidate was Álvaro Arzú who won in 1995, becoming Guatemala's 32nd president (1996–2000). Óscar Berger ran as the party's presidential candidate in the 1999 Guatemalan General Election becoming the runner-up in 1999. After winning PAN’s presidential candidacy in late 2002, he was going to run as the party's presidential candidate in the 2003 Guatemalan General Election. However, internal divisions plagued the party and Óscar Berger decided to leave PAN and enter the second round of the 2003 presidential elections as the candidate for the Gran Alianza Nacional (GANA), an alliance of 3 parties including Partido Patriota (PP), Movimiento Reformador (MR) and Partido Solidaridad Nacional (PSN).

== 2003 election ==
At the 2003 elections, held on 9 November 2003, the party won 8.4% of the popular vote and 17 out of 158 seats in Congress. The party's presidential candidate, Leonel López Rodas, won 8.4% in the presidential elections held on the same day; duly eliminated, he did not compete in the second round.

== 2007 election ==
At the 2007 elections, the party was badly defeated, but still received representation in Congress with 4.58% of the vote and three seats. Its presidential candidate, Óscar Casteñeda, received 2.56% of the vote.

== 2011 election ==
In the 2011 Election, the party chose Juan Guillermo Gutiérrez as its presidential candidate. He came in seventh place with 2.76% of the vote. In the Legislative Election, the party won 1.27% of the vote and 2 seats in Congress.

== 2015 election ==
In the 2015 Election, the party again chose Juan Guillermo Gutiérrez as its presidential candidate. He came in tenth place with 3.10% of the vote. In the Legislative Election, the party won 1.90% of the vote and 3 seats in Congress.

== 2019 election ==
In the 2019 Election, the party chose Roberto Arzú as its presidential candidate. He came in fifth place with 6.10% of the vote. In the Legislative Election, the party won 1.25% of the vote and 2 seats in Congress.

After the elections, the party generally supported the government faction in Congress, voting in favor of the government proposed slate for the directorate of Congress in January 2020 and October 2021.

== Electoral history ==
=== Presidential elections ===
Election	Candidates		First round		Second round		Status
Election	President	Vice President	Votes	%	Votes	%	Status
1990-91	Álvaro Arzú	Fraterno Vila Betoret	268,796	17.29 (#4)	—N/a	—N/a	Lost
1995-96	Álvaro Arzú	Luis Alberto Flores Asturias	565,393	36.50 (#1)	671,354	51.22 (#1)	Won
1999	Óscar Berger	Arabella Castro Quiñónez	664,417	30.32 (#2)	549,408	31.68 (#2)	Lost
2003	Leonel Eliseo López Rodas	Rubén Alfonso Ramírez	224,127	8.35 (#4)	—N/a	—N/a	Lost
2007	Óscar Castañeda	Roger Valenzuela	83,369	2.54 (#9)	—N/a	—N/a	Lost
2011	Juan Guillermo Gutiérrez	Carlos Zúñiga	122,800	2.76 (#7)	—N/a	—N/a	Lost
2015	Juan Guillermo Gutiérrez	Manuel Alfredo Marroquín Pineda	149,925	3.12 (#10)	—N/a	—N/a	Lost
2019	Roberto Arzú	José Antonio Farias	267,049	6.10 (#5) (Note: In alliance with Podemos.)	—N/a	—N/a	Lost
2023	None	None	—N/a	—N/a	—N/a	—N/a	Did not participate

=== Legislative elections ===
Election	Votes	%	Seats	+/–	Status
1990-91	268,776	17.29 (#4)	12 / 116	New	Opposition
1994	162,189	25.25 (#2)	23 / 80	▲11	Opposition
1995-96	645,446	37.76 (#1)	43 / 80	▲20	Government
1999	570,108	26.92 (#2)	37 / 113	▼6	Opposition
2003	278,393	10.91 (#4)	16 / 158	▼21	Opposition
2007	143,268	4.54 (#8)	3 / 158	▼13	External support
2011	136,247	3.11 (#8)	2 / 158	▼1	External support
2015	158,309	3.47 (#12)	3 / 158	▲1	External support
2019	110,016	2.73 (#17)	2 / 160	▼1	External support
2023	45,940	1.10 (#20)	0 / 160	▼2	Extra-parliamentary
