= Alfonso Portillo =

President of Guatemala from 2000 to 2004

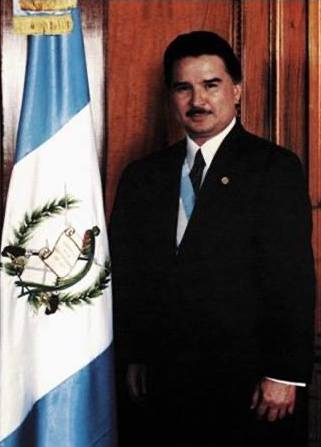
- Official portrait, 2000

45th President of Guatemala
- In office 14 January 2000 – 14 January 2004
- Vice President: Juan Francisco Reyes López
- Preceded by: Álvaro Arzú
- Succeeded by: Óscar Berger

Personal details
- Born: 24 September 1951 (age 75) Zacapa, Guatemala
- Party: Firmes (since 2026)
- Other political affiliations: Guatemalan Christian Democracy (1993–1995); Guatemalan Republican Front (1995–2004); Independent (2004–2017); Todos (2017–2020); Independent (2020–2022); Vision with Values (2022–2024)
- Spouses: María Eugenia Padúa González (m. 1981; div. 1990) Evelyn Morataya (m. 1995; div. 2005)

Alfonso Antonio Portillo Cabrera (born 24 September 1951) is a Guatemalan politician who served as the 45th president of Guatemala from 2000 to 2004.

He took office on 14 January 2000, representing the Guatemalan Republican Front (FRG), the party then led by retired general and deposed military ruler Efraín Ríos Montt (1926–2018). In 2014, ten years after his departure from the presidency, Portillo would plead guilty to corruption charges in a United States court.

== Early life and education ==
Portillo was born in Zacapa. He obtained his academic qualifications in Mexico. He allegedly received a degree in social sciences from the Autonomous University of Guerrero (UAG) in Chilpancingo, Guerrero, and his doctorate from the National Autonomous University of Mexico (UNAM) in Mexico City. However, the veracity of such claims remains to be determined since no evidence has been provided to support them.

== Career ==
In the late 1970s, he became involved with left-wing indigenous groups in Guerrero and the Guatemalan National Revolutionary Unity (URNG). During the 1980s, he lectured in political science at the university in Chilpancingo. During that time, Portillo shot and killed two students. He later claimed that he had shot the students in self-defense. His political opponents, however, asserted that he had killed the two unarmed students in a "bar brawl." He was never charged for the shootings, and in 1995, a Mexican judge declared the case "inactive."

In 1989, Portillo returned to Guatemala and joined the Social Democratic Party, which had replaced the Authentic Revolutionary Party the previous year. The little-known PSD was one of the few leftist parties that survived the military repression that characterized the 1970s and 1980s. He then moved to the Guatemalan Christian Democrats (DCG). This center-right formation was the governing party at that time. In 1992, he was appointed Director of the Guatemalan Institute of Social and Political Sciences (IGESP), a role he held till 1994. He became the DCG's Secretary General in 1993, was elected as one of their deputies in 1994, and became head of their group in Congress. During this time, he also became an editorial adviser to Siglo Veintiuno, one of the two largest-selling daily newspapers.

=== FRG ===
In April 1995, Portillo and another seven of the DCG's 13 deputies, left the party to become independents after the parliamentary group was accused of corruption. On 20 July 1995, he joined the Guatemalan Republican Front (FRG). Its leader, Efraín Ríos Montt, was at the time leader of Congress. When Ríos Montt was constitutionally barred from running in the 12 November presidential election because he had previously taken power through a coup d'etat, the FRG chose Portillo as their candidate. After gaining 22% of the vote in the first round of voting, he lost to Álvaro Arzú in the second round on 7 January 1996. With both candidates promising to finalize the peace negotiations, Portillo narrowly lost, garnering 48.7% of the vote.

=== Presidential aspirations ===
In July 1998, the FRG voted for him to be their presidential candidate the following year, having decided not to nominate Ríos Montt. Portillo launched a campaign in favor of bringing morality into political life, to implacably fight corruption, and to defend the indigenous population and the poor campesinos against the small, urban, white elite. He also promised security in the face of the growing problem of delinquency during Arzú's tenure in the office. In contrast to 1995, the issue of the homicides in Mexico was brought up and became a central electoral issue. Portillo immediately admitted that he had shot the two students but claimed it was an act of self-defense. He said that he had fled from the Mexican authorities rather than face trial, both because of his political affiliations and because he was a foreigner in Mexico. These revelations enhanced Portillo's as a "tough, no-nonsense" politician. On 7 November, he won the first round with 47.8% of the vote, and in the second round on 26 December, he decisively beat Óscar Berger with 68.3% of the vote.

=== Presidency (2000–2004) ===
On the day of his investiture, Portillo said that Guatemala was "on the edge of collapse" and promised a thorough government investigation into corruption. On 9 August 2000, he declared that the governments of the previous two decades had been involved in human rights abuses. While he showed determination to see through his regenerative and progressive program, his government soon became overwhelmed by the reality of the political and mafia corruption in the country. During 2001 his government faced a continuous wave of protests that sapped its credibility. The FRG was accused of bringing corruption to the nation on an unprecedented scale. His government has been tainted by accusations of theft, money laundering, money transferring to the army, and the creation of bank accounts in Panama, Mexico, and the United States by many members of his staff, totaling more than US$1 billion.

In the first round of the November 2003 elections (see: 2003 Guatemala election), he backed former dictator Efraín Ríos Montt to succeed him. However, the FRG lost to Óscar Berger Perdomo's GANA party, who was sworn in to replace Portillo on 14 January 2004.

A 2014 audit of 2001 showed illegal transfers from other departments to the military.

=== Post-presidency ===
When his political immunity was revoked on 19 February 2004, Portillo immediately fled to Mexico. On 16 August 2004, immigration authorities granted him a year-long work visa. He then lived in Mexico City in an apartment in one of the city's most exclusive neighborhoods. Portillo was accused of authorizing $15 million in transfers to the Guatemalan defense department, where authorities believe most of the money was stolen by his associates. After a long process, Mexico's foreign ministry approved Portillo's extradition back to Guatemala on 30 October 2006. His actual extradition did not occur until 7 October 2008.

According to reports in May 2007, Portillo sued Guatemala in the Central American Court of Justice in Nicaragua to be reinstated as a member of the Central American Parliament (and thus regain his immunity from prosecution).

In January 2010, reports stated that the U.S. government was looking for Portillo in relation to money laundering charges.

On 26 January 2010, Portillo was apprehended by local authorities in Guatemala near Punta de Palma.

Portillo and his associates were absolved of all embezzlement charges on 9 May 2011 by a Guatemalan court that determined that prosecutors, Guatemala's Public Ministry, did not present sufficient evidence to convict the former president. The Public Ministry stated they disagreed with the court's decision and announced plans to appeal the ruling.

On 26 August 2011, the Constitutional Court ruled that he must be extradited to the United States. He would then be the first former Guatemalan President to stand prosecution in the United States. He was extradited to the United States on 24 May 2013 to face money laundering charges. He is accused of laundering US$70 million of Guatemalan money through US banks.

On 18 March 2014, former President Portillo pleaded guilty at a hearing before United States District Judge Robert P. Patterson. On 22 May 2014, Judge Patterson sentenced Portillo to 70 months in prison, $2.5 million in forfeiture and a $100 special assessment fee. Guatemala's former president, 62 years of age, faced a maximum penalty of 20 years in prison and a $500,000 fine or twice the money involved in the illegal transactions.

On 25 February 2015, Portillo was released from prison in Denver, the U.S., and returned to Guatemala City.

Political offices
Preceded by Álvaro Arzú	President of Guatemala; 2000–2004	Succeeded by Óscar Berger
