= July 1944 Guatemalan presidential election =

- 4 July 1944
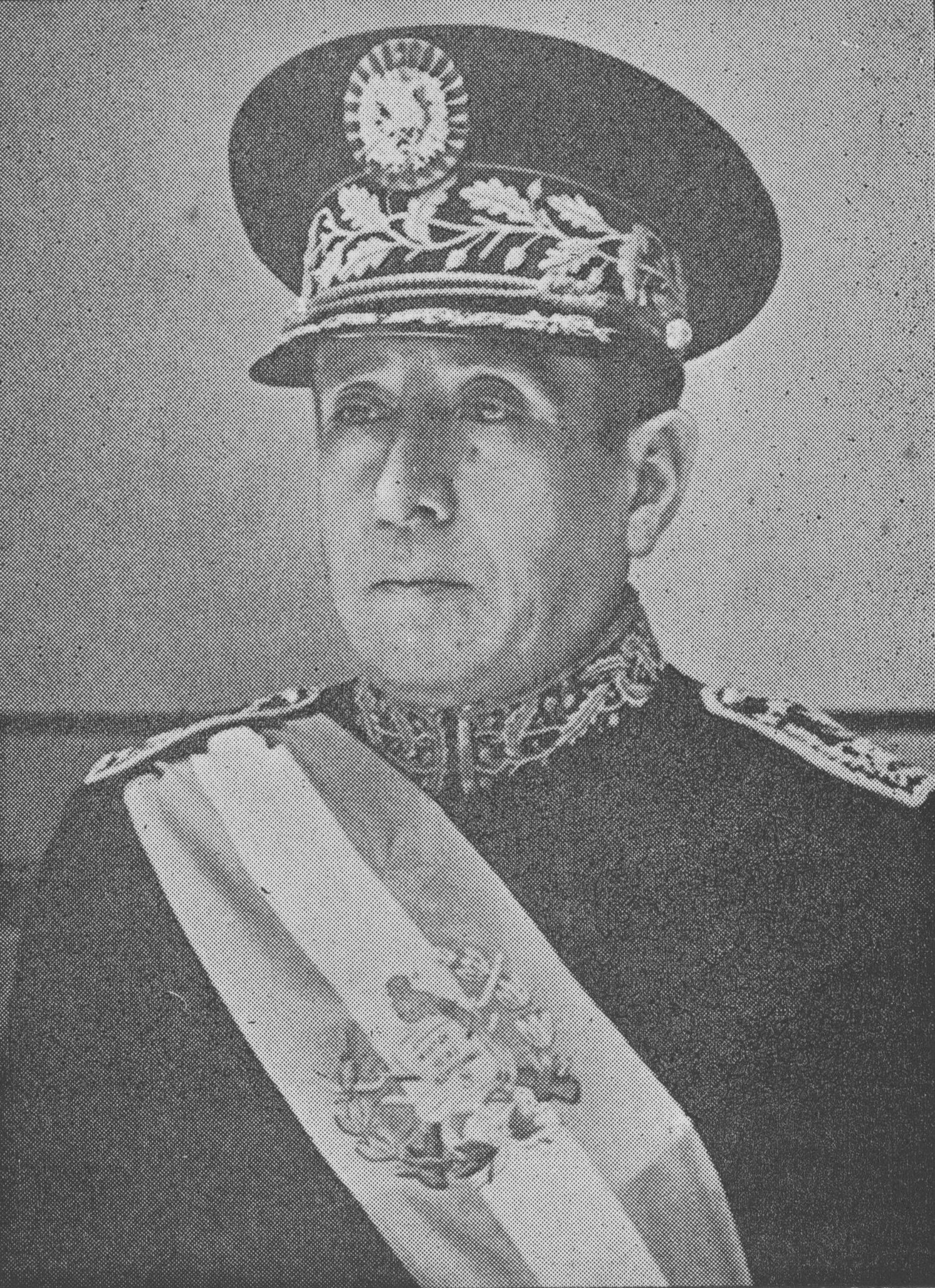
Nominee	Juan Federico Ponce Vaides
Party	Liberal
Percentage	100%
Head of State before election
Pineda, Villagrán, Ponce
Liberal
Elected Head of State
Juan Federico Ponce Vaides
Liberal

A presidential election was held in Guatemala on 4 July 1944.

President Jorge Ubico y Castañeda resigned on 1 July 1944. “For the last two weeks of June, students, teachers, workers, women, and middle-class professionals had demonstrated their opposition to his dictatorial policies. The old dictator fought at first and then decided that he had had enough. He left power in the hands of a military triumvirate”.

The new junta was made up of Buenaventura Pineda, Eduardo Villagrán, and Federico Ponce Vaides.

On July 4, the most ambitious member of the junta, General Ponce, easily convinced a Congress to elect him provisional president.

Ponce’s troops round up the congressional delegates and force them to vote for him.
