= Social Participative Democracy =

Guatemalan political party

The Social Participative Democracy (Democracia Social Participativa) was a political party in Guatemala. At the last legislative elections, held on 9 November 2003, the party won 1.1% of the popular vote but no seats in Congress. Its presidential candidate José Ángel Lee won 1.6% in the presidential elections of the same day.

It became deregistered after it failed to achieve either 5% or a single deputy in the 2003 election.

The idea of Social Participative Democracy stems from the idea of decentralization, meaning that civil members of a society should be able to be more actively involved in governmental decisions.
