= Authentic Integral Development =

Authentic Integral Development Desarrollo Integral Auténtico
- Abbreviation: DIA
- Founded: 13 June 1993
- Dissolved: 21 August 2008
- Ideology: Left-wing nationalism Progressivism
- Political position: Left-wing

Authentic Integral Development (Spanish: Desarrollo Integral Auténtico) was a left-wing nationalist political party in Guatemala. At the 2003 Guatemalan general election, held on 9 November 2003, the party won 3.0% of the popular vote and 1 out of 158 seats in Congress. Its presidential candidate Eduardo Suger Cofiño won 2.2% in the presidential elections of the same day.

In the 2007 Guatemalan general election, held on 9 September 2007, the party secured 1.43% of the votes in the race for national-list deputies and, save for defections, will have no representation in the 2008-12 Congress. In the presidential election of the same day, its candidate Héctor Rosales won 0.57% of the popular vote. The party has been deregistered since it achieved neither 5% of the votes nor a single deputy.
