= National Solidarity Party (Guatemala) =

The National Solidarity Party (Spanish: Partido Solidaridad Nacional, PSN) was a political party in Guatemala.

In the general election held on 9 November 2003, the party was part of the Grand National Alliance (GANA). In the legislative election, GANA won 24.3% of the vote, and 47 out of 158 seats in Congress. The presidential candidate of the alliance, Óscar Berger Perdomo, won 34.3% at the presidential elections of the same day. He won 54.1% at the second round and was elected president.

In November 2005, following the withdrawal of the other two member parties from GANA, the PSN ceded its registration as a political party to the Grand National Alliance. In effect, the PSN became the GANA.
