= Grand National Alliance (Guatemala) =

Grand National Alliance Gran Alianza Nacional
- Founded: 30 August 2002 (as a political alliance); 26 June 2005 (as a political party)
- Dissolved: 28 September 2018
- Headquarters: 6ª. Avenida 3-44 Zona 9, Guatemala City, Guatemala
- Ideology: Conservatism; Familism; Central American integration
- Political position: Centre-right to right-wing
- Colors: Blue and red

The Grand National Alliance (Spanish: Gran Alianza Nacional, GANA) was a right-wing conservative political party in Guatemala. The acronym "GANA" also spells out the word gana, from the verb ganar, "to win".

== Formation and 2003 election ==
GANA was created as an electoral alliance to fight the 2003 general election. In that election, held on 9 November 2003, the Grand National Alliance, won 24.3% of the vote, and 47 out of 158 seats in Congress. The presidential candidate of the alliance, Óscar Berger Perdomo, won 34.3% at the presidential elections of the same day. He won 54.1% at the second round on 28 December 2003 and was elected president.

The alliance was made up of the following parties:

- Patriotic Party (Partido Patriota) (PP)
- Reform Movement (Movimiento Reformador) (MR)
- National Solidarity Party (Partido Solidaridad Nacional) (PSN)

== Evolution and 2007 election ==
The Patriotic Party broke with the alliance in the early months of Óscar Berger's administration. In November 2005, the National Solidarity Party ceded its electoral registration to GANA, with which the Grand National Alliance ceased to be an alliance and became a political party. In August 2006, the Reform Movement withdrew its support from GANA. ^{[usurped]}

GANA's candidate in the 2007 presidential election was former director of the national prison service Alejandro Giammattei. He came in third place in the election, with 17% of the vote. Despite the splits in the party, it did relatively well in the congressional elections, receiving 37 seats and becoming the second largest party in Congress.

In 2017 the party was renamed Crecer (Grow) and its colours were changed to yellow and green. It was dissolved in September 2018.

== Election results ==
=== Congress of the Republic ===
| Election | Votes | % | Seats | +/– | Status |
|---|---|---|---|---|---|
| 2003 | 620,121 | 24.30 (#1) (Note: As a political alliance containing PP, MR and PSN.) | 47 / 158 | ▲47 | Government |
| 2007 | 521,600 | 16.54 (#2) (Note: As a political party continuing the PSN.) | 37 / 158 | ▼10 | External support |
| 2011 | 985,610 | 22.47 (#2) (Note: In alliance with UNE.) | 39 / 158 | ▲2 | External support |

=== President of the Republic of Guatemala ===
| Election | Candidates | | First round | | Second round | | Status |
| Election | President | Vice President | Votes | % | Votes | % | Status |
|---|---|---|---|---|---|---|---|
| 2003 | Óscar Berger | Eduardo Stein | 921,233 | 34.33 (#1) | 1,235,303 | 54.13 (#1) | Won |
| 2007 | Alejandro Giammattei | Alfredo Vila Girón | 565,017 | 17.23 (#3) | - | - | Lost |
| 2011 | Sandra Torres | Roberto Díaz-Durán | — | — | — | — | Disqualified |
