= Institutional Republican Party =

Institutional Republican Party Partido Republicano Institucional
- Leader: Luis Fernando Pérez Martínez
- Founder: Efraín Ríos Montt
- Founded: 1989; 37 years ago
- Registered: 10 January 1990
- Dissolved: 28 November 2015; 10 years ago
- Succeeded by: Valor
- Ideology: Conservatism; Right-wing populism Anti-communism; Christian right
- Political position: Right-wing to far-right
- Colors: Blue

The Institutional Republican Party (Spanish: Partido Republicano Institucional, PRI), until 2013 known as the Guatemalan Republican Front (Frente Republicano Guatemalteco, FRG), was a right-wing to far-right political party in Guatemala.

== History ==
Logo of the Frente Republicano Guatemalteco (FRG, "Guatemalan Republican Front") founded by General Ríos Montt in 1989 and officially registered in 1990. The logo is based on an image used by the military government in 1982–83 and tied to the motto No robo, no miento, no abuso ("I don't steal, I don't lie, I don't abuse"). Here the motto has been changed to Seguridad, bienestar, justicia ("Security, welfare, justice").

It was created in 1989 by former president and dictator Efraín Ríos Montt, and formally registered in 1990. It chose Ríos Montt as its candidate, but he was not allowed to stand because of a constitutional ban on former coup leaders such as himself from seeking the presidency. By the time the decision was made to ban him, it was too late for the FRG to choose another candidate. They did win 10 seats in the National Congress in those concurrent elections. It was the main component of the "No Sell-Out Platform", an alliance of right-wing parties.

In early elections only to the Congress in 1994 the FRG gained 32 seats and became the largest single party in the legislature. In the 1995 presidential election, FRG candidate Alfonso Portillo narrowly lost in the second round, which is a run-off between the two highest placed candidates from the first round ballot. It gained a reduced 21 seats in Congress.

In 1999 Alfonso Portillo won the presidential election, while the FRG, with 63 seats, had a majority in Congress. Ríos Montt became the President of Congress (speaker). Paradoxically they gained their strongest support from the same rural communities that had most suffered under the former rule of Ríos Montt between 1982 and 1983.

For the 2003 presidential elections, the FRG again put forward Ríos Montt as its presidential candidate. Contradictory judicial rulings on whether he would be able to stand motivated a march on Guatemala City by FRG supporters bussed in from all over the country on 24 July, resulting in a chaotic situation known as Jueves Negro ("Black Thursday"). Days later the ban on Ríos Montt's candidacy was lifted by the Constitutional Court. Opponents claimed that the FRG obtained that ruling by previously appointing its own loyalists to the high court. Meanwhile, Ríos Montt claimed that previous judicial rulings preventing him from running for president were the work of his political opponents.

Despite a vigorously run campaign, the violence of Jueves Negro, as well as the numerous corruption scandals of the incumbent Portillo administrations, adversely impacted Ríos Montt's popularity and credibility. He was third in first round of voting, with 19.3% of the ballots. In the congressional elections held the same day, 9 November 2003, the FRG won 19.7% of the popular vote and 43 out of 158 seats, dropping to second in the chamber.

Ríos Montt's daughter, Zury Ríos, was the party's floor leader.

For the 2007 elections, the party chose Luis Rabbe as its presidential candidate. With the large number of right-wing parties running in the election, the FRG was badly defeated in these elections. Rabbe came in fifth place with 7.3% of the vote, and the party received 9% of the vote and 15 seats in the congressional elections.

In January 2013, the FRG was renamed to Institutional Republican Party (PRI). Zury Ríos left the party to become Vision with Values (ViVa)'s presidential candidate in 2015. Instead, PRI nominated the manager and Congressman Luis Fernando Pérez as its candidate.

=== 2015 election ===
In the legislative elections held on 6 September 2015, the PRI secured 57,948 votes (1.25% of the total) in the race for national-list deputies and, save for defections, will have no representation in the 2016-2020 Congress. In the presidential election held on the same day, its candidate Luis Fernando Pérez received 41,969 votes (0.86%).

Having failed to secure the minimum of 5% of the popular vote or one seat in Congress, the PRI forfeited its official registration as a party. The party was dissolved soon afterwards.
