= Patriotic Party (Guatemala) =

Patriotic Party Partido Patriota
- Leader: Valentín Gramajo
- General Secretary: Valentín Gramajo
- Founded: March 13, 2001; 25 years ago
- Dissolved: January 31, 2017; 9 years ago
- Headquarters: 11 calle 11-54 zona 1, Guatemala City
- Ideology: Liberal conservatism Conservatism
- Political position: Centre-right to Right-wing
- International affiliation: Liberal International
- Regional affiliation: RELIAL
- Colors: Orange
- Slogan: "Hard Hand: I'm a patriot and I love my country" (Mano Dura: Soy patriota y amo a mi país)

Website
- www.partidopatriota.com

The Patriotic Party (Spanish: Partido Patriota, PP) was a conservative political party in Guatemala. It was founded on 24 February 2001 by retired army officer Otto Pérez Molina.

Strongly compromised by corruption cases, the party fell from 36% support in 2011 to 4% in 2015. It is dissolved on court order in January 2017.

== 2003 election ==
At the legislative elections held on 9 November 2003, the party was part of the Grand National Alliance which won 24.3% of the vote and 47 out of 158 Congressional seats of which 5 seats went to the Patriotic Party, albeit on shared tickets. The presidential candidate of the alliance, Óscar Berger Perdomo, won 34.3% at the presidential elections of the same day. He won 54.1% at the second round and was elected president.

== 2007 election ==
In 2007 elections, the Patriotic Party won 15.91% of the vote and 30 seats in Congress. Presidential candidate General Otto Pérez Molina placed second in the presidential race with 23.5% of the vote, eventually losing in the November 4 run-off to Álvaro Colom of the National Unity of Hope (UNE).

== 2011 election ==
In 2011 elections, the party again chose Pérez Molina as its presidential candidate. He came in first place with 36.01% of the vote; in the Legislative Election, the party won 26.62% of the vote and 56 seats in Congress, more than any other party. On November 6, 2011, in the second round of the election, Pérez Molina was elected President of Guatemala.

== 2015 election ==
In 2015 elections, the party chose Mario David García as its presidential candidate. He came in seventh place with 4.63% of the vote. In the Legislative Election, the party won 9.43% of the vote and 17 seats in Congress.

== Corruption ==
Former President Otto Pérez Molina is imprisoned for his involvement in the customs fraud network called La Línea. Former Vice President Roxana Baldetti is also imprisoned for her participation in the network, and is also accused of drug trafficking. Former Interior Minister Mauricio Lopez is also accused of drug trafficking and should be the object of extradition request of the United States. Former Vice Minister of the Interior and the Director General of Police were arrested for fraudulent sales of armored vehicles which brought them four million dollars. In March others party leaders were arrested for another corruption case.

According to Insight Crime, the patriotic Party has strong ties with groups of drug traffickers.

== Armed attacks on the Patriotic Party ==
Some party members have been attacked by unidentified elements, probably belonging to rival right wing factions. On 11 November 2000, Pérez Molina's son, Otto Pérez Leal, was attacked by gunmen while driving with his wife and infant daughter. On 21 February 2001, three days before Pérez Molina was scheduled to launch his new political party, masked gunmen attacked and wounded his daughter Lissette. The same day, masked gunmen shot and killed Patricia Castellanos Fuentes de Aguilar, who had just departed her house after meeting with Pérez Molina's wife, Rosa María Leal. On 14 March, four armed men shot and killed Jorge Rosal, a regional leader of the PP, as he left the party's Guatemala City headquarters. Four days earlier, Rosal had participated in a march with other members of the PP involved in the Civic Movement, a political association founded to protest government corruption. On 15 May, the widower of Patricia Castellanos, Francisco Aguilar Alonzom, who had been investigating his wife's death and had formed a citizens' group opposed to violence and impunity, was shot and killed in his car. Human rights groups claimed that the killings were politically motivated.

On 9 October 2007, armed assailants shot and killed Aura Marina Salazar Cutzal, secretary to the Patriotic Party's congressional delegation and assistant to Pérez Molina, along with a professional bodyguard, Valerio Ramiro Castañón. Salazar Cutzal, 33, was a Kaqchikel Mayan Indian and a mother of two. Pérez Molina blamed organized crime for the killing and said it was the eighth murder of a member of his party.
