= Francisco Javier Arana =

Guatemalan military leader (1905–1949)

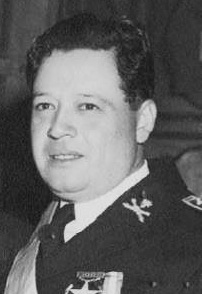
- Arana in 1944

Chief of the Armed Forces
- In office 15 March 1945 – 18 July 1949
- President: Juan José Arévalo
- Minister: Jacobo Árbenz
- Preceded by: Position established
- Succeeded by: Carlos Paz Tejada

Head of State and Government of Guatemala
- In office 20 October 1944 – 15 March 1945 Serving with Jacobo Árbenz and Jorge Toriello
- Preceded by: Federico Ponce Vaides
- Succeeded by: Juan José Arévalo

Acting Minister of Defense
- In office 20 October 1944 – 15 March 1945
- Preceded by: David Corado
- Succeeded by: Jacobo Árbenz

Personal details
- Born: 3 December 1905 Villa Canales, Guatemala
- Died: 18 July 1949 (aged 43) Amatitlán, Guatemala
- Profession: Military officer
- Known for: Leading the revolutionary junta ruling Guatemala from 1944 to 1945

Military service
- Allegiance: Guatemala
- Branch/service: Presidential Honor Guard
- Rank: Colonel

Francisco Javier Arana Castro (Latin American Spanish: [fɾanˈsisko xaˈβjeɾ aˈɾana ˈkastɾo]; 3 December 1905 – 18 July 1949) was a Guatemalan military leader and one of the three members of the revolutionary junta that ruled Guatemala from 20 October 1944 to 15 March 1945 during the early part of the Guatemalan Revolution. A major in the Guatemalan army under the dictator Jorge Ubico, he allied with a progressive faction of the army to topple Ubico's successor Federico Ponce Vaides. He led the three-man junta that oversaw the transition to a democratic government, although he was personally reluctant to allow the elected President Juan José Arévalo to take office in 1945. He served as the Chief of the Armed Forces in the new government until 1949. On 18 July 1949 he was killed in a shootout with supporters of the Arévalo government after he threatened to launch a coup.

== Early and personal life ==
Francisco Javier Arana Castro was born on 3 December 1905 in Villa Canales, Guatemala. His parents, Ángel María Arana and Margarita Castro, were from a lower-middle-class family. He had both Spanish and Indigenous heritage, and the latter trait was visually more prominent. He did not have a formal education, but he was relatively well read, and was described by his contemporaries as canny and intelligent, and as a charismatic and convivial person. He was described as a poor public speaker, but as a very persuasive man in intimate conversations. In 1946, during the Guatemalan Revolution, a staff member at the United States embassy described his politics as nationalist, as well as being slightly pro-American.

== October revolution ==
In June 1944, a series of popular protests forced the resignation of dictator Jorge Ubico. Ubico appointed Federico Ponce Vaides leader of a three-person junta which would lead the provisional government. A few days later, Ponce Vaides persuaded the Congress to appoint him interim president. Ponce pledged to hold free elections soon, while continuing Ubico's policy of suppressing the protests. This resulted in growing support for an armed revolution among some sections of the populace. By this time, the Guatemalan Army was disillusioned with the junta, and progressives within it had begun to plot a coup.

Arana became a member of this plot only in its later stages; the plot was initially led by Jacobo Árbenz and Aldana Sandoval. However, as the commander of the Guardia de Honor, Arana was in a position of substantial authority within the army. Sandoval was able to persuade Arana to join the coup in its final stages. On 19 October, Arana and Árbenz launched a coup against the government of Ponce Vaides. They were joined the next day by other factions of the army and the civilian population. Initially, the battle went against the revolutionaries, but after an appeal for support their ranks were swelled by unionists and students, and they eventually subdued the police and army factions loyal to Ponce Vaides. On 20 October, the next day, Ponce Vaides surrendered unconditionally. Both Arana and Árbenz fought with distinction in the coup. Arana, Árbenz and Jorge Toriello became members of a new three-person ruling junta, with Arana, who as a Major was the ranking army officer, becoming its senior member.

Arana did not wish to turn over power to a civilian administration. He tried to persuade Árbenz and Toriello to postpone the election, and after Juan José Arévalo was elected President in December 1944, he asked them to declare the election results invalid. Árbenz and Toriello insisted that Arévalo be allowed to take power, which Arana reluctantly agreed to, on the condition that Arana's position as the commander of the military be unchallenged. Arévalo had no choice but to agree to this, and so the new Constitution of Guatemala, created in 1945, created a new position of "Commander of the Armed Forces," a position which was more powerful than that of the defense minister. He could only be removed by Congress, and even then only if he was found to have broken the law. When Arévalo was inaugurated as President, Arana stepped into this new position, and Árbenz was sworn in as defense minister.

== Chief of the Armed Forces ==
After Arana assumed his new and powerful position, an American embassy official stated in a dispatch that Arana was the type of personality that might assume dictatorial power. On 16 December 1945, Arévalo was seriously injured in a car accident and incapacitated for a period. The leaders of the Revolutionary Action Party (PAR), the party that supported the government, were afraid that Arana would take the opportunity to launch a coup. A handful of its leaders approached Arana and made a deal with him, which later came to be known as the Pacto del Barranco (Pact of the Ravine). Arana agreed to refrain from seizing power with the military; in return, the PAR agreed to support Arana's candidacy in the next presidential election, scheduled for November 1950. This undertaking was given in writing. However, it was kept a secret; the American embassy only learned of it in 1947. Arévalo himself recovered swiftly, but was forced to support the agreement.

Although Guatemala was not completely democratized by the Guatemalan Revolution (illiterate women, for example, were still denied the vote) it nonetheless brought about substantial labor reforms. The parties that supported Arévalo's government were led by young middle class individuals, who supported this process. The reforms alarmed Guatemala's landowning elite, who looked for a political candidate who would support their cause. Thus, a number of wealthy Guatemalans began to cultivate Arana's support against the labor reforms of Arévalo. Arana began to publicly complain about the labor reforms, without actually taking any actions against Arévalo. In the 1948 congressional election, he supported a number of anti-Arévalo candidates; however, none of them were elected to Congress.

After the electoral failure, Arana continued to try, through threats and persuasion, to get elected representatives to support him. He talked to José Manuel Fortuny, a leftist leader in the PAR. Fortuny later said that Arana asked him "Why don't you and your friends like me? I'm not a man of the right," to which Fortuny responded "We are not against you. We appreciate the role that you played in the revolt against Ponce. It's just that you have no sympathy for labour." By 1949 the National Renovation Party and the PAR were both openly hostile to Arana. A small faction of the Popular Liberation Front (FPL) supported him, but was soundly defeated at the FPL party convention in 1949. As a result, the faction split off to support Arana. The leftist parties decided to back Árbenz instead, as they believed that only a military officer could defeat Arana. In 1947, Arana had demanded that certain labor leaders be expelled from the country; Árbenz vocally disagreed with Arana, and the latter's intervention limited the number of deportees.

== Death ==
In order to run for election, the constitution required that Arana resign his military position by May 1950, and that his successor be chosen by Congress from a list submitted by the Consejo Superior de la Defensa (CSD) ("Superior Defense Council"). Elections for the CSD were scheduled for July 1949. The months before this election saw intense wrangling, as Arana supporters tried to gain control over the election process. Specifically, they wanted the election to be supervised by regional commanders loyal to Arana, rather than centrally dispatched observers. Arana called an emergency meeting of the CSD just before the scheduled election, at which no agreement was reached; but a few days later, Arana's supporters suddenly gave in to the demands of Árbenz's supporters.

On 16 July 1949, Arana delivered an ultimatum to Arévalo, demanding the expulsion of all of Árbenz' supporters from the cabinet and the military; he threatened a coup if his demands were not met. Arévalo informed Árbenz and other progressive leaders of the ultimatum, who all agreed that Arana should be exiled. A secret meeting of the permanent committee of the congress met and voted to dismiss Arana. Cuban President Carlos Prío Socarrás agreed to give Arana asylum there. Two days later, Arévalo and Arana had another meeting, at which Arévalo later said that Arana was highly threatening and abusive. On the way back, Arana's convoy was intercepted by a small force led by Árbenz. A shootout ensued, killing three men, including Arana. Arana's supporters in the military rose up in revolt, but they were leaderless, and by the next day the rebels asked for negotiations. The coup attempt left approximately 150 dead and 200 wounded. Many of Arana's supporters, including Carlos Castillo Armas, were exiled. The details of the incident were not made public.

In a speech on 21 July, Arévalo made a speech describing Arana's death. He suggested that Arana had flirted with conspiring against the president with people hostile to Arévalo, but had eventually refused to overthrow the government, and been assassinated for his refusal. He did not name the assassins, but suggested that they were members of the conservative opposition. He declared five days of national mourning in Arana's honor. Prior to making this speech, Arévalo shared the text with his ministers. Árbenz and a few others had disagreed with its thrust, and suggested that the entire truth be told; however, they were overruled by the majority of the ministers. Historian Piero Gleijeses stated that if Arana had attempted a coup without delivering an ultimatum, he would likely have succeeded. However, his overconfidence in his hold over the military, as well as his lingering desire to take power in a legitimate manner, led to his effort being sabotaged before it truly began. Gleijeses also stated that Árbenz probably had orders to capture, rather than to kill, Arana.

== Sources ==
- Forster, Cindy (2001). The Time of Freedom: Campesino Workers in Guatemala's October Revolution. Pittsburgh, Pennsylvania: University of Pittsburgh Press. ISBN 978-0-8229-4162-0.
- Immerman, Richard H. (1982). The CIA in Guatemala: The Foreign Policy of Intervention. University of Texas Press. ISBN 978-0-292-71083-2.
- Gleijeses, Piero (1990). "The Death of Francisco Arana: A Turning Point in the Guatemalan Revolution" (PDF). Journal of Latin American Studies. 22 (3): 527–552. doi:10.1017/S0022216X00020940. S2CID 145333696.
- Lima, Flavio Rojas (2004). Diccionario histórico biográfico de Guatemala (in Spanish). Asociación de Amigos del País, Fundación para la Cultura y el Desarrollo. ISBN 978-99922-44-01-2.
