= Aldana Sandoval =

Colonel Carlos Aldana Sandoval was a Guatemalan military officer who was a significant figure in the popular uprising against the government of Federico Ponce Vaides in October 1944. At the time of the uprising, Sandoval held the rank of Major in the Guardia de Honor, a powerful unit of the military. Sandoval, one of the leaders of the plot among the military (along with Jacobo Árbenz), was among those who felt that the plot should remain among the military: however, Árbenz insisted on including civilians in the process. Sandoval was able to persuade Francisco Javier Arana to join the coup in its final stages, but did not participate in the actual coup. Historian Piero Gleijeses stated that Sandoval was among the plotters who lost his nerve at the last minute.

In 1950, Sandoval was serving as the Minister for Public Works in the government of Juan José Arévalo. At the time, he held the rank of Colonel. After the coup attempt in 1949 by Arana and Arana's subsequent death at the hands of a force led by Árbenz, Sandoval was among the cabinet ministers who were in favor of telling the public the entire truth about Arana's death; however, they were overruled, because Arévalo was afraid the truth would further inflame the citizenry.

Sandoval also served as Minister for Communications in the government of Jacobo Árbenz. He was later appointed the Guatemalan government's ambassador to the United States; while in this position, he was known to express concern that the Guatemalan government had leftist tendencies within it.

During the 1954 Guatemalan coup d'état, he was among those influenced by the Central Intelligence Agency's campaign of psychological warfare: he remarked that the rebel forces led by Carlos Castillo Armas were being strengthened by thousands of volunteers, which led to his belief that Árbenz could not hold on to power. Sandoval was a member of a military junta created by Carlos Enrique Díaz de León that was supposed to take over the government should Árbenz fall ill. Sandoval eventually sought asylum in the embassy of El Salvador.

== Sources ==
- Gleijeses, Piero (1992). Shattered hope: the Guatemalan revolution and the United States, 1944–1954. Princeton University Press. ISBN 978-0-691-02556-8.
- Holly, Susan K. (2003). Foreign Relations of the United States,1952–1954: Guatemala. Government Printing Office. p. 5. ISBN 9780160513046.
- McGehee, Richard V. (1994). "Revolution, Democracy, and Sport: The Guatemalan "Olympics" of 1950" (PDF). Olympika: The International Journal of Olympic Studies. 3. Archived from the original (PDF) on August 25, 2016.
- Schlesinger, Stephen; Kinzer, Stephen (1999). Bitter Fruit: The Story of the American Coup in Guatemala. David Rockefeller Center series on Latin American studies, Harvard University. ISBN 978-0-674-01930-0.
