= Guatemalan Revolution =

1944–1954 period in Guatemala

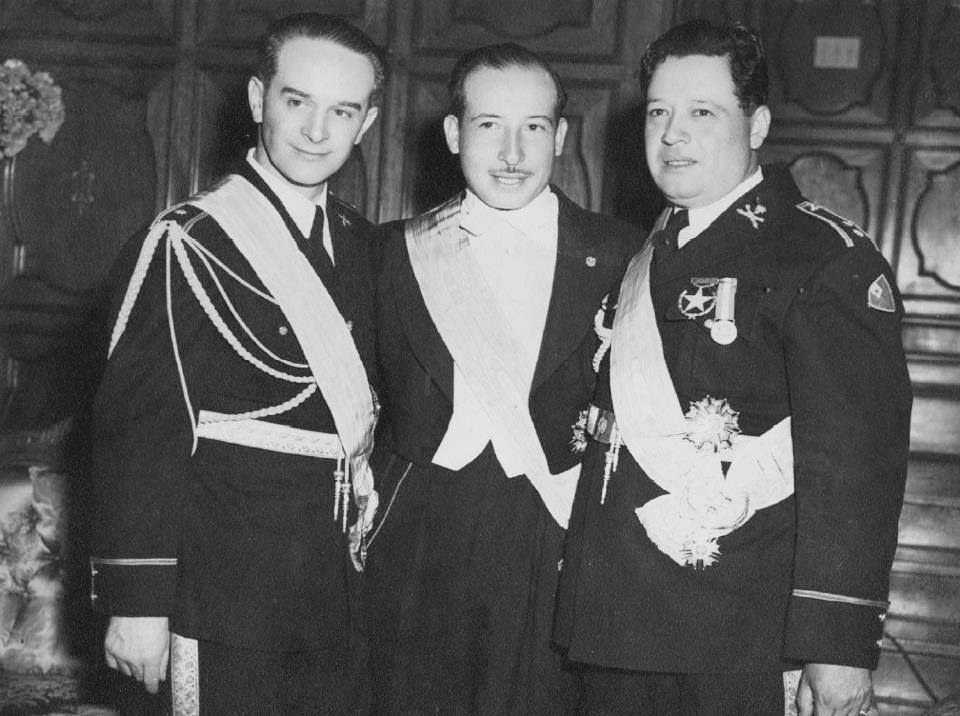
- Jacobo Árbenz, Jorge Toriello, and Francisco Arana, members of the military junta.
- Date: 20 October 1944 – 27 June 1954 (9 years, 8 months)
- Location: Guatemala
- Also known as: The Ten Years of Spring
- Cause: Authoritarianism; Dispossession of communal lands of indigenous people by the administrations of Manuel Estrada Cabrera and Jorge Ubico in favor of the United Fruit Company; Large reduction in labor rights
- Motive: Social democracy Democratic socialism
- Outcome: Ruling junta resigns; First largely free presidential and parliamentary elections held in 1944. Juan José Arévalo elected president; Progressive social and agrarian/land reforms initiated, including Decree 900; Labor laws passed to increase worker rights, including a set of health and safety standards in workplaces, a standardized an eight-hour working day and 45-hour working week for non-plantation laborers, and bans on discrimination in salaries, and required plantation owners to construct primary schools for the children of their workers; Foreign policy shift to support anti-authoritarian movements such as the Caribbean Legion in other countries; Military coup attempt against the government in 1949 fails; Jacobo Árbenz elected president in 1950; CIA supports 1954 coup d'état via Operation PBFortune, which is successful; Guatemalan Civil War begins in 1960; Free and fair elections not held until 1995

The period in the history of Guatemala between the coups against Jorge Ubico in 1944 and Jacobo Árbenz in 1954 is known locally as the Revolution (Spanish: La Revolución). It has also been called the Ten Years of Spring, highlighting the peak years of representative democracy in Guatemala from 1944 until the end of the civil war in 1996. It saw the implementation of social, political, and especially agrarian reforms that were influential across Latin America.

From the late 19th century until 1944, Guatemala was governed by a series of authoritarian rulers who sought to strengthen the economy by supporting the export of coffee. Between 1898 and 1920, Manuel Estrada Cabrera granted significant concessions to the United Fruit Company, an American corporation which traded in tropical fruit, and dispossessed many indigenous people of their communal lands. Under Jorge Ubico, who ruled as a dictator between 1931 and 1944, this process was intensified, with the institution of harsh labor regulations and a police state.

In June 1944, a popular pro-democracy movement led by university students and labor organizations forced Ubico to resign. He appointed a three-person military junta to take his place, led by Federico Ponce Vaides. This junta continued Ubico's oppressive policies, until it was toppled in a military coup led by Jacobo Árbenz in October 1944, an event also known as the "October Revolution". The coup leaders formed a junta which swiftly called for open elections. These elections were won in a landslide by Juan José Arévalo, a progressive professor of philosophy who had become the face of the popular movement. He implemented a moderate program of social reform, including a widely successful literacy campaign and a largely free election process, although illiterate women were not given the vote and communist parties were banned.

Following the end of Arévalo's presidency in 1951, Jacobo Árbenz was elected to the presidency in a landslide. Árbenz continued Arévalo's reforms, and began an ambitious land-reform program, known as Decree 900. Under it, the uncultivated portions of large land-holdings were expropriated in return for compensation, and redistributed to poverty-stricken agricultural laborers. Approximately 500,000 people benefited from the decree. The majority of them were indigenous people, whose forebears had been dispossessed after the Spanish invasion. Árbenz's policies ran afoul of the United Fruit Company, which lost some of its uncultivated land. The company lobbied the US government for the overthrow of Árbenz, and the US State Department responded by engineering a coup under the pretext that Árbenz was a communist. Carlos Castillo Armas took power at the head of a military junta, starting the Guatemalan Civil War. The war lasted from 1960 to 1996, and saw the military commit genocide against the indigenous Maya peoples and widespread human rights violations against civilians.

== Background ==
=== Early 20th Century ===
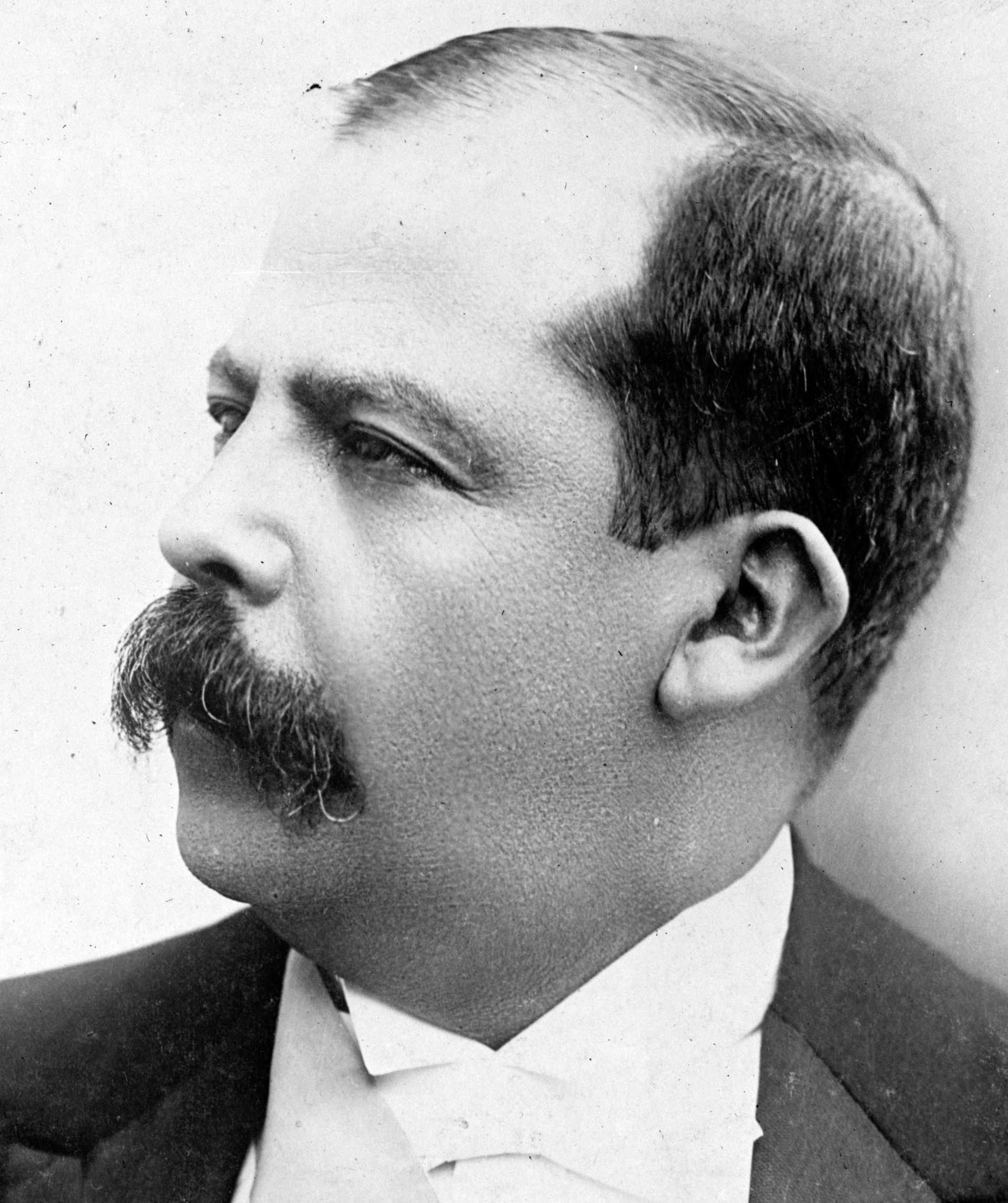
Manuel Estrada Cabrera, President of Guatemala from 1898 to 1920. Cabrera granted large concessions to the American United Fruit Company

Prior to the Spanish invasion in 1524, the population of Guatemala was almost exclusively Maya. The Spanish conquest created a system of wealthy European landowners overseeing a labor force composed of slaves and bonded laborers. However, the community lands of the indigenous population remained in their control until the late 19th century. At this point, rising global demand for coffee made its export a significant source of income for the government. As a result, the state supported the coffee growers by passing legislation that took land away from the Indian population, as well as relaxing labor laws so that bonded labor could be used on the plantations.

The US-based United Fruit Company (UFC) was one of many foreign companies that acquired large tracts of both state land and indigenous land. Manuel Estrada Cabrera, who was president of Guatemala from 1898 to 1920, permitted limited unionization in rural Guatemala, but also made further concessions to the UFC. In 1922, the Communist Party of Guatemala was created, and became a significant influence among urban laborers; however, it had little reach among the rural and Indian populations. In 1929, the Great Depression led to the collapse of the economy and a rise in unemployment, leading to unrest among workers and labourers. Fearing the possibility of a revolution, the landed elite lent their support to Jorge Ubico y Castañeda, who had built a reputation for ruthlessness and efficiency as a provincial governor. Ubico won the election that followed in 1931, in which he was the only candidate.

=== Dictatorship of Jorge Ubico ===
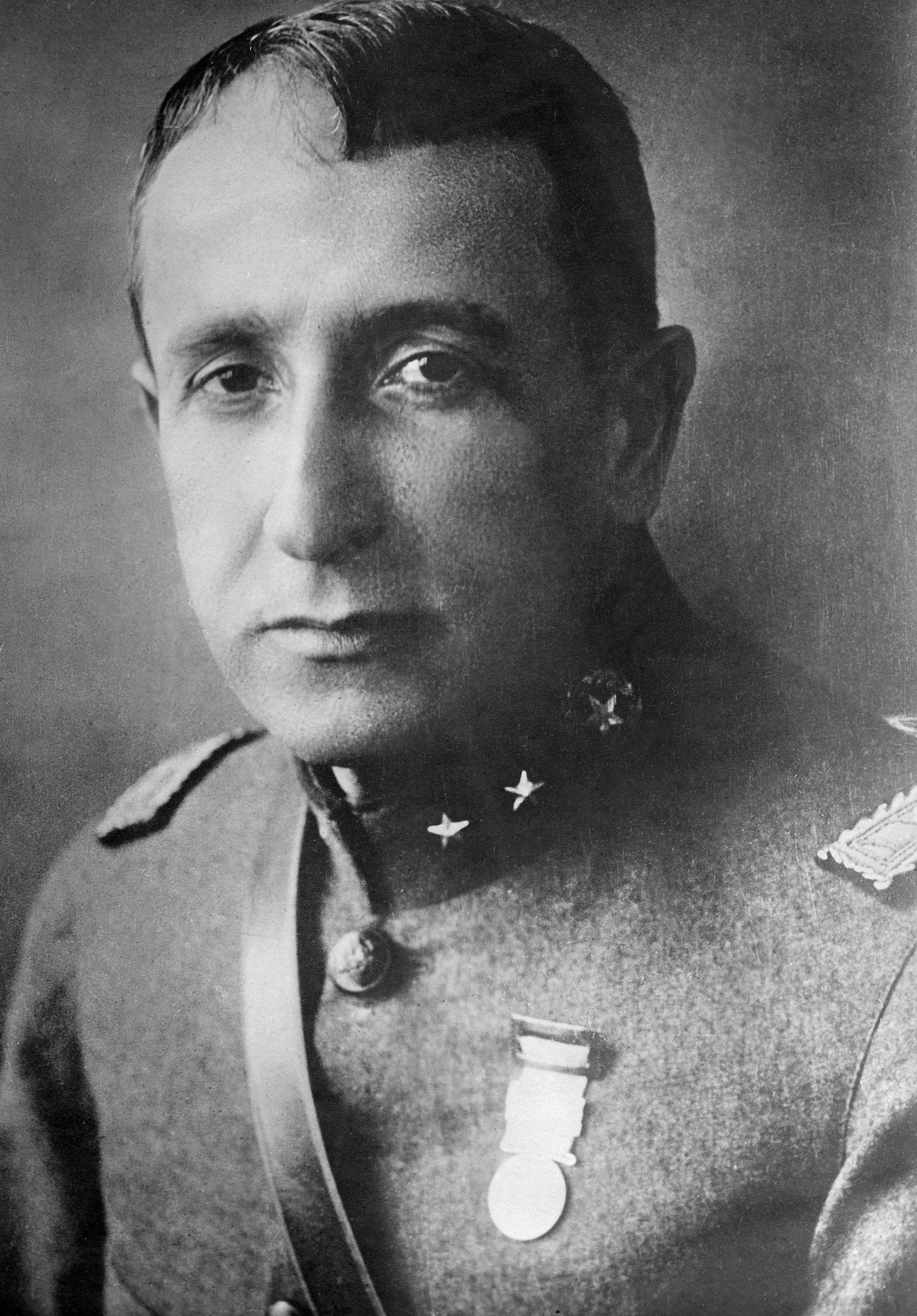
Jorge Ubico, the dictator of Guatemala from 1931 to 1944. He passed laws allowing landowners to use lethal force to defend their property

Ubico had made statements supporting the labor movement when campaigning for the presidency, but after his election his policy quickly became authoritarian. He abolished the system of debt peonage, and replaced it with a vagrancy law, which required all men of working age who did not own land to perform a minimum of 100 days of hard labor. In addition, the state made use of unpaid Indian labor to work on public infrastructure like roads and railroads. Ubico also froze wages at very low levels, and passed a law allowing land-owners complete immunity from prosecution for any action they took to defend their property, an action described by historians as legalizing murder. He greatly strengthened the police force, turning it into one of the most efficient and ruthless in Latin America. The police were given greater authority to shoot and imprison people suspected of breaking the labor laws. The result of these laws was to create tremendous resentment against him among agricultural laborers. Ubico was highly contemptuous of the country's indigenous people, once stating that they resembled donkeys.

Ubico had great admiration for the fascist leaders of Europe, such as Francisco Franco and Benito Mussolini. However, he saw the United States as an ally against the supposed communist threat of Mexico. He made a concerted effort to gain American support; when the US declared war on Germany and Japan in 1941, Ubico followed suit, and acting on American instructions arrested all people of German descent in Guatemala. He permitted the US to establish an air base in Guatemala, with the stated aim of protecting the Panama Canal. Like his predecessors, he made large concessions to the United Fruit Company, granting it 200,000 hectares (490,000 acres) of public land in exchange for a promise to build a port. He later released the company from this obligation as well, citing the economic crisis. Since its entry into Guatemala, the UFC had expanded its land holdings by displacing the peasantry and converting their farmland into banana plantations. This process accelerated under Ubico, whose government did nothing to stop it.

=== June 1944 general strike ===
The onset of World War II increased economic unrest in Guatemala. Ubico responded by cracking down more fiercely on any form of protest or dissent. In 1944, popular revolt broke out in neighboring El Salvador, which briefly toppled dictator Maximiliano Hernández Martínez. However, he quickly returned to power, leading to a flood of exiled El Salvadorian revolutionaries moving to Guatemala. This coincided with a series of protests at the university in Guatemala City. Ubico responded by suspending the constitution on 22 June 1944. The protesters, who by this point included many middle-class members in addition to students and workers, called for a general strike, and presented an ultimatum to Ubico the next day, demanding the reinstatement of the constitution. They also presented him a petition signed by 311 of the most prominent Guatemalan citizens. Ubico sent the police to disrupt the protests by firing on them, and declared martial law.

=== Ubico resigns and appoints an interim government ===
Clashes between protesters and the military continued for a week, during which the revolt gained momentum. At the end of June, Ubico submitted his resignation to the National Assembly, leading to huge celebrations in the streets.

The resignation of Ubico did not restore democracy. Ubico appointed three generals, Federico Ponce Vaides, Eduardo Villagrán Ariza, and Buenaventura Pineda, to a junta which would lead the provisional government. A few days later, Ponce Vaides persuaded the congress to appoint him interim president. Ponce pledged to hold free elections soon, while at the same time suppressing the protests. Press freedom was suspended, arbitrary detentions continued, and memorial services for slain revolutionaries were prohibited. However, the protests had grown to the point where the government could not stamp them out, and rural areas also began organizing against the dictatorship. The government began using the police to intimidate the indigenous population to keep the junta in power through the forthcoming election. This resulted in growing support for an armed revolution among some sections of the populace. By now, the army was disillusioned with the junta, and progressives within it had begun to plot a coup.

On 1 October 1944, Alejandro Cordova, the editor of El Imparcial, the main opposition newspaper, was assassinated. This led to the military coup plotters reaching out to the leaders of the protests, in an attempt to turn the coup into a popular uprising. Ponce Vaides announced elections, but the pro-democracy forces denounced them as a fraud, citing his attempts to rig them. Ponce Vaides sought to stabilize his regime by playing on inter-racial tension within the Guatemalan population. The most vocal support for the revolution had come from the Ladinos, or people of mixed racial or Spanish descent. Ponce Vaides sought to exploit their fear of the Indians by paying thousands of indigenous peasants to march in Guatemala City in his support, and promising them land if they supported the Liberal party that Ubico had begun as a front for the dictatorship.

== October revolution ==
By mid-October, several different plans to overthrow the junta had been set in motion by various factions of the pro-democracy movement, including teachers, students, and progressive factions of the army. On 19 October, the government learned of one of these conspiracies.

That same day, a small group of army officers launched a coup, led by Francisco Javier Arana and Jacobo Árbenz Guzmán. Although the coup had initially been plotted by Árbenz and Major Aldana Sandoval, Sandoval had prevailed upon Arana to join them; however, Sandoval himself did not participate in the coup attempt, and was described as having "lost his nerve". They were joined the next day by other factions of the army and the civilian population. Initially, the battle went against the revolutionaries, but after an appeal for support their ranks were swelled by unionists and students, and they eventually subdued the police and army factions loyal to Ponce Vaides. On October 20, the next day, Ponce Vaides surrendered unconditionally.

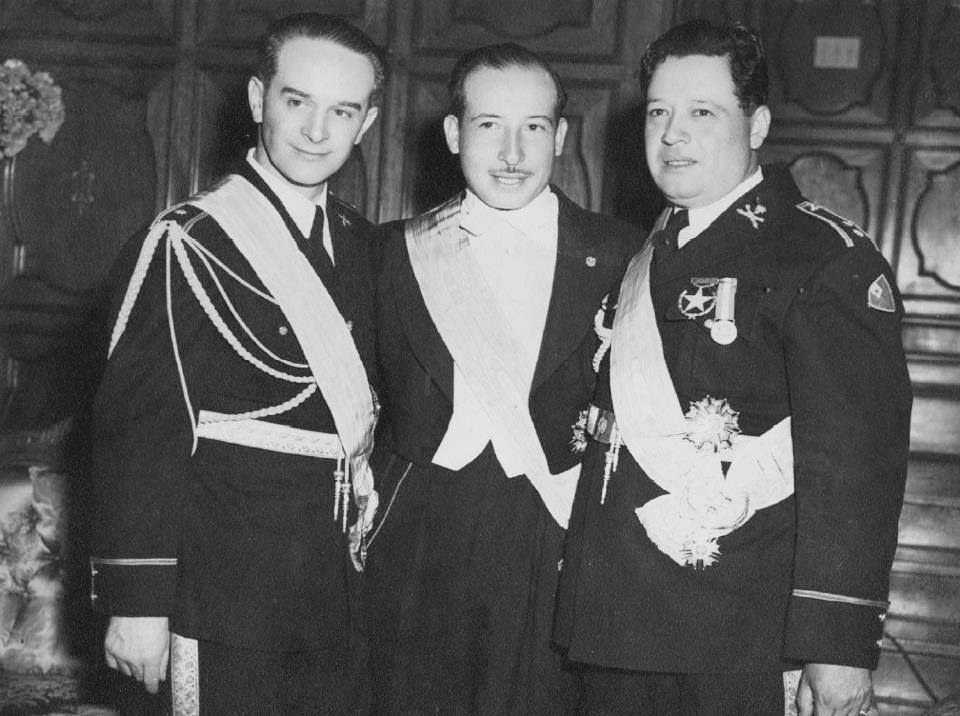
Jacobo Árbenz, Jorge Toriello, and Francisco Arana, who oversaw the transition to a civilian government after the October Revolution

Ponce Vaides was allowed to leave the country safely, as was Ubico himself. The military junta was replaced by another three-person junta consisting of Árbenz, Arana, and an upper-class youth named Jorge Toriello, who had played a significant role in the protests. Although Arana had come to the military conspiracy relatively late, his defection had brought the powerful Guardia de Honor (Honor Guard) over to the revolutionaries, and for this crucial role he was rewarded with a place on the junta. The junta promised free and open elections to the presidency and the congress, as well as for a constituent assembly.

The resignation of Ponce Vaides and the creation of the junta has been considered by scholars to be the beginning of the Guatemalan Revolution. However, the revolutionary junta did not immediately threaten the interests of the landed elite. Two days after Ponce Vaides' resignation, a violent protest erupted at Patzicía, a small Indian hamlet. The junta responded with swift brutality, silencing the protest. The dead civilians included women and children.

=== Election of Arévalo ===
Juan José Arévalo Bermejo was born into a middle-class family in 1904. He became a primary school teacher for a brief while, and then earned a scholarship to a university in Argentina, where he earned a doctorate in the philosophy of education. He returned to Guatemala in 1934, and sought a position in the Ministry of Education. However, he was denied the position he wished for, and felt uncomfortable under the dictatorship of Ubico. He left the country and held a faculty position in Argentina until 1944, when he returned to Guatemala. In July 1944 the Renovación Nacional, the teachers' party, had been formed, and Arévalo was named its candidate. In an unexpected surge of support, his candidacy was endorsed by many of the leading organizations among the protesters, including the student federation. His lack of connection to the dictatorship and his academic background both worked in his favor among the students and teachers. At the same time, the fact that he had chosen to go into exile in conservative Argentina rather than revolutionary Mexico reassured landowners worried about socialist or communist reform.

The subsequent elections took place in December 1944, and were broadly considered free and fair, although only literate men were given the vote. Unlike in similar historical situations, none of the junta members stood for election. Arévalo's closest challenger was Adrián Recinos, whose campaign included a number of individuals identified with the Ubico regime. The ballots were tallied on 19 December 1944, and Arévalo won in a landslide, receiving more than four times as many ballots as the other candidates combined.

== Presidency of Arévalo ==
Arévalo took office on 15 March 1945, inheriting a country with numerous social and economic issues. Despite Ubico's policy of using unpaid labor to build public roads, internal transport was severely inadequate. 70% of the population was illiterate, and malnutrition and poor health were widespread. The wealthiest 2% of landowners owned nearly three quarters of agricultural land, and as a result less than 1% was cultivated. The indigenous peasants either had no land, or had far too little to sustain themselves. Three quarters of the labor force were in agriculture, and industry was essentially nonexistent.

=== Ideology ===
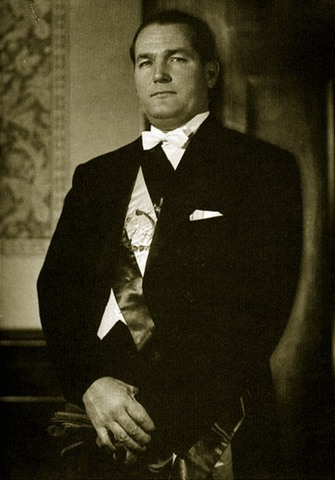
Juan José Arévalo in 1945

Arévalo identified his ideology as "spiritual socialism". He held the belief that the only way to alleviate the backwardness of most Guatemalans was through a paternalistic government. He was strongly opposed to classical Marxism, and believed in a capitalist society that was regulated to ensure that its benefits went to the entire population. Arévalo's ideology was reflected in the new constitution that the Guatemalan assembly ratified soon after his inauguration, which was one of the most progressive in Latin America. It mandated suffrage for all but illiterate women, a decentralization of power, and provisions for a multiparty system. Communist parties were, however, forbidden. The constitution and Arévalo's socialist ideology became the basis for much of the reform enacted under Arévalo and (later) Jacobo Árbenz. Although the US government would later portray the ideology of the revolution as radical communist, it did not in fact represent a major shift leftward, and was staunchly anti-communist. Arévalo's economic vision for the country was centered around private enterprise.

=== Labor movement ===
The revolution in 1944 left many of the biggest opponents of organized labor unaffected, such as the landed elite and the United Fruit Company. The revolution, and election of Arévalo, nonetheless marked a significant shift in the fortunes of labor unions. The protests of 1944 strengthened the labor movement to the point where Ponce Vaides stopped enforcing the repressive vagrancy law, which was abolished in the 1945 constitution. On 1 May 1945, Arévalo made a speech celebrating organized labor, to a tremendously positive reception. The freedom of press guaranteed in the new constitution also drew much attention to the brutal working conditions in Guatemala City. From the beginning, the new unions that were formed fell into two camps, those that were communist and those that were not. The repressive policies of the Ubico government had driven both factions underground, but they re-emerged after the revolution.

The communist movement was also strengthened by the release of those of its leaders who had been imprisoned by Ubico. Among them were Miguel Mármol, Víctor Manuel Gutiérrez, and Graciela García, the latter unusual for being a woman in a movement that women were discouraged from participating in. The communists began to organize in the capital, and established a school for workers, known as the Escuela Claridad, or the Clarity School, which taught reading, writing, and also helped organize unions. Six months after the school was established, President Arévalo closed the school down, and deported all the leaders of the movement who were not Guatemalan. However, the communist movement survived, mostly by its dominance of the teachers' union.

Arévalo's response toward the non-communist unions was mixed. In 1945, he criminalized all rural labor unions in workplaces with fewer than 500 workers, which included most plantations. One of the few unions big enough to survive this law was of the banana workers employed by the UFC. In 1946 this union organized a strike, which provoked Arévalo into outlawing all strikes until a new labor code was passed. This led to efforts on the part of employers to stall the labor code, as well as to exploit workers as far as possible before it was passed. The unions were also damaged when the US government persuaded the American Federation of Labor to found the Organización Regional Internacional del Trabajo (ORIT), a union that took a strongly anti-communist stance.

Despite the powerful opposition, by 1947 the labor unions had managed to organize enough support to force the congress to pass a new labor code. This law was revolutionary in many ways; it forbade discrimination in salary levels on the basis of "age, race, sex, nationality, religious beliefs, or political affiliation". It created a set of health and safety standards in the workplace, and standardized an eight-hour working day and a 45-hour working week, although the congress succumbed to pressure from the plantation lobby and exempted plantations from this provision. The code also required plantation owners to construct primary schools for the children of their workers, and expressed a general commitment to "dignifying" the position of workers. Although many of these provisions were never enforced, the creation of administrative mechanisms for this law in 1948 allowed several of its provisions to be systematically enforced. The law as a whole had a huge positive impact on worker rights in the country, including raising the average wages by a factor of three or more.

=== Foreign relations ===
The Arévalo government attempted to support democratic ideals abroad as well. One of Arévalo's first actions was to break diplomatic relations with the government of Spain under dictator Francisco Franco. At two inter-American conferences in the year after his election, Arévalo recommended that the republics in Latin America not recognize and support authoritarian regimes. This initiative was defeated by the dictatorships supported by the United States, such as the Somoza regime in Nicaragua. In response, Arévalo broke off diplomatic ties with the Nicaraguan government and with the government of Rafael Trujillo in the Dominican Republic. Frustrated by the lack of results from working with the other Latin American governments, Arévalo began to support the Caribbean Legion, which sought to replace dictatorships with democracies across Latin America, by force if necessary. This led to the administration being labelled as communist by the dictatorial governments in the region.

The Arévalo government also floated the idea of a Central American Federation, as being the only way that a democratic government could survive in the region. He approached several leaders of democratic Central American countries, but was rejected by all except Castañeda Castro, the president of El Salvador. The two leaders began talks to build a union, and set up several commissions to look into the issue. In late 1945 they announced the formation of the union, but the formalization of the process got delayed by internal troubles in both countries, and in 1948 the Castro government was toppled in a military coup led by Óscar Osorio.

=== 1949 coup attempt ===
As the highest-ranking military officer in the October Revolution, Francisco Arana had led the three-man junta that formed the interim government after the coup. He was opposed to handing over power to a civilian government, first seeking to postpone the 1944 election, and then to annul it. In return for allowing Arévalo to become president, Arana was granted the newly created position of "chief of the armed forces", ranked above the minister of defense. The position had a six-year term, and controlled all military appointments. In December 1945, Arévalo was involved in a motoring accident which left him seriously injured. Fearing a military coup, the leaders of the Revolutionary Action Party (PAR) made a pact with Arana, in which the party agreed to support his candidacy in the 1950 elections in return for a promise to refrain from a coup.

Arana's support began to be solicited by the landed elite, who felt threatened by Arévalo's reforms. Arana, who was not initially inclined to get involved with politics, began to make occasional statements against the government. In the 1948 parliamentary election, he backed a number of opposition candidates, all of whom were defeated. By 1949 the National Renovation Party and the PAR were both openly hostile to Arana, while a small fragment of the Popular Liberation Front split off to support him. The leftist parties decided to back Árbenz instead, as they believed that only a military officer could defeat Arana.

On 16 July 1949, Arana delivered an ultimatum to Arévalo, demanding the expulsion of all of Árbenz's supporters from the cabinet and the military; he threatened a coup if his demands were not met. Arévalo informed Árbenz and other progressive leaders of the ultimatum, who all agreed that Arana should be exiled. Two days later, Arévalo and Arana had another meeting; on the way back, Arana's convoy was intercepted by a small force led by Árbenz. A shootout ensued, killing three men, including Arana. Arana's supporters in the military rose up in revolt, but they were leaderless, and by the next day the rebels asked for negotiations. The coup attempt left approximately 150 dead and 200 wounded. Many of Arana's supporters, including Carlos Castillo Armas, were exiled. The details of the incident were not made public.

== Presidency of Árbenz ==
=== Election ===
Árbenz's role as defense minister had already made him a strong candidate for the presidency, and his firm support of the government during the 1949 uprising further increased his prestige. In 1950, the economically moderate Partido de Integridad Nacional (PIN) announced that Árbenz would be its presidential candidate in the upcoming election. This announcement was quickly followed by endorsements from most parties on the left, including the influential PAR, as well as from labor unions. Árbenz had only a couple of significant challengers in the election, in a field of ten candidates. One of these was Jorge García Granados, who was supported by some members of the upper-middle class who felt the revolution had gone too far. Another was Miguel Ydígoras Fuentes, who had been a general under Ubico, and who had the support of the hardline opponents of the revolution. During his campaign, Árbenz promised to continue and expand the reforms begun under Arévalo. The election was held on 15 November 1950, and Árbenz won more than 60% of the vote, in elections that were free and fair with the exception of the disenfranchisement of illiterate female voters. Árbenz was inaugurated as president on 15 March 1951.

=== Árbenz's personal background ===
Árbenz was born in 1913 into a middle-class family of Swiss heritage. In 1935 he had graduated from the Escuela Politécnica, Guatemala's national military academy, with excellent grades, and had subsequently become an officer in the Guatemalan army under Ubico. As an officer, Árbenz himself had been required to escort chain-gangs of prisoners. This process had radicalized him, and he had begun to form links to the labor movement. In 1938 he had met and married María Villanova, who was also interested in social reform, and who became a significant influence on him and a national figure in her own right. Another strong influence on him was José Manuel Fortuny, a well-known Guatemalan communist, who was one of his main advisers during his government. In 1944, disgusted with Ubico's authoritarian regime, he and his fellow officers had begun plotting against the government. When Ubico resigned in 1944, Árbenz had witnessed Ponce Vaides intimidate the congress into naming him president. Highly offended by this, Árbenz plotted against Ponce Vaides, and was one of the military leaders of the coup that toppled him, in addition to having been one of the few officers in the revolution who had formed and maintained connections to the popular civilian movement.

=== Agrarian reform ===
The biggest component of Árbenz's project of modernization was his agrarian reform bill. Árbenz drafted the bill himself with the help of advisers that included some leaders of the communist party as well as non-communist economists. He also sought advice from numerous economists from across Latin America. The bill was passed by the National Assembly on 17 June 1952, and the program went into effect immediately. The focus of the program was on transferring uncultivated land from large landowners to their poverty stricken laborers, who would then be able to begin a viable farm of their own. Árbenz was also motivated to pass the bill because he needed to generate capital for his public infrastructure projects within the country. At the behest of the United States, the World Bank had refused to grant Guatemala a loan in 1951, which made the shortage of capital more acute.

The official title of the agrarian reform bill was Decree 900. It expropriated all uncultivated land from landholdings that were larger than 673 acres (272 ha). If the estates were between 672 acres (272 ha) and 224 acres (91 ha) in size, uncultivated land was expropriated only if less than two-thirds of it was in use. The owners were compensated with government bonds, the value of which was equal to that of the land expropriated. The value of the land itself was the value that the owners had declared in their tax returns in 1952. The redistribution was organized by local committees that included representatives from the landowners, the laborers, and the government. Of the nearly 350,000 private land-holdings, only 1710 were affected by expropriation. The law itself was cast in a moderate capitalist framework; however, it was implemented with great speed, which resulted in occasional arbitrary land seizures. There was also some violence, directed at land-owners, as well as at peasants that had minor landholdings of their own.

By June 1954, 1.4 million acres of land had been expropriated and distributed. Approximately 500,000 individuals, or one-sixth of the population, had received land by this point. The decree also included provision of financial credit to the people who received the land. The National Agrarian Bank (Banco Nacional Agrario, or BNA) was created on 7 July 1953, and by June 1954 it had disbursed more than $9 million in small loans. 53,829 applicants received an average of 225 US dollars, which was twice as much as the Guatemalan per capita income. The BNA developed a reputation for being a highly efficient government bureaucracy, and the United States government, Árbenz's biggest detractor, did not have anything negative to say about it. The loans had a high repayment rate, and of the $3,371,185 handed out between March and November 1953, $3,049,092 had been repaid by June 1954. The law also included provisions for nationalization of roads that passed through redistributed land, which greatly increased the connectivity of rural communities.

Contrary to the predictions made by the detractors of the government, the law resulted in a slight increase in Guatemalan agricultural productivity, and to an increase in cultivated area. Purchases of farm machinery also increased. Overall, the law resulted in a significant improvement in living standards for many thousands of peasant families, the majority of whom were indigenous people. Historian Piero Gleijeses stated that the injustices corrected by the law were far greater than the injustice of the relatively few arbitrary land seizures. Historian Greg Grandin stated that the law was flawed in many respects; among other things, it was too cautious and deferential to the planters, and it created communal divisions among peasants. Nonetheless, it represented a fundamental power shift in favor of those that had been marginalized before then.

== United Fruit Company ==
=== History ===
The United Fruit Company had been formed in 1899 by the merger of two large American corporations. The new company had major holdings of land and railroads across Central America, which it used to support its business of exporting bananas. In 1900 it was already the world's largest exporter of bananas. By 1930 it had an operating capital of US$215 million and had been the largest landowner and employer in Guatemala for several years. Under Manuel Estrada Cabrera and other Guatemalan presidents, the company obtained a series of concessions in the country that allowed it to massively expand its business. These concessions frequently came at the cost of tax revenue for the Guatemalan government. The company supported Jorge Ubico in the leadership struggle that occurred from 1930 to 1932, and upon assuming power, Ubico expressed willingness to create a new contract with it. This new contract was immensely favorable to the company. It included a 99-year lease to massive tracts of land, exemptions from virtually all taxes, and a guarantee that no other company would receive any competing contract. Under Ubico, the company paid virtually no taxes, which hurt the Guatemalan government's ability to deal with the effects of the Great Depression. Ubico asked the company to pay its workers only 50 cents a day, to prevent other workers from demanding higher wages. The company also virtually owned Puerto Barrios, Guatemala's only port to the Atlantic Ocean, allowing the company to make profits from the flow of goods through the port. By 1950, the company's annual profits were US$65 million, twice the revenue of the Guatemalan government.

=== Impact of the revolution ===
Due to its long association with Ubico's government, the United Fruit Company (UFC) was seen as an impediment to progress by Guatemalan revolutionaries after 1944. This image was worsened by the company's discriminatory policies towards its colored workers. Thanks to its position as the country's largest landowner and employer, the reforms of Arévalo's government affected the UFC more than other companies. Among other things, the labor code passed by the government allowed its workers to strike when their demands for higher wages and job security were not met. The company saw itself as being specifically targeted by the reforms, and refused to negotiate with the numerous sets of strikers, despite frequently being in violation of the new laws. The company's labor troubles were compounded in 1952 when Jacobo Árbenz passed Decree 900, the agrarian reform law. Of the 550,000 acres (220,000 ha) that the company owned, 15% were being cultivated; the rest of the land, which was idle, came under the scope of the agrarian reform law.

=== Lobbying efforts ===
The United Fruit Company responded with intensive lobbying of members of the United States government, leading many US congressmen and senators to criticize the Guatemalan government for not protecting the interests of the company. The Guatemalan government responded by saying that the company was the main obstacle to progress in the country. American historians observed that "To the Guatemalans it appeared that their country was being mercilessly exploited by foreign interests which took huge profits without making any contributions to the nation's welfare." In 1953, 200,000 acres (81,000 ha) of uncultivated land was expropriated by the government, which offered the company compensation at the rate of 2.99 US dollars to the acre, twice what the company had paid when it bought the property. More expropriation occurred soon after, bringing the total to over 400,000 acres (160,000 ha); the government offered compensation to the company at the rate at which the UFC had valued its own property for tax purposes. This resulted in further lobbying in Washington, particularly through Secretary of State John Foster Dulles, who had close ties to the company. The company had begun a public relations campaign to discredit the Guatemalan government; it hired public relations expert Edward Bernays, who ran a concerted effort to portray the company as the victim of the Guatemalan government for several years. The company stepped up its efforts after Dwight Eisenhower had been elected in 1952. These included commissioning a research study on Guatemala from a firm known to be hawkish, which produced a 235-page report that was highly critical of the Guatemalan government. Historians have stated that the report was full of "exaggerations, scurrilous descriptions and bizarre historical theories". The report nonetheless had a significant impact on the Congressmen that it was sent to. Overall, the company spent over a half-million dollars to influence both lawmakers and members of the public in the US that the Guatemalan government needed to be overthrown.

== CIA instigated coup d'état ==
=== Political motivations ===
In addition to the lobbying of the United Fruit Company, several other factors also led the United States to launch the coup that toppled Árbenz in 1954. During the years of the Guatemalan Revolution, military coups occurred in several other Central American countries that brought firmly anti-communist governments to power. Army officer Major Oscar Osorio won staged elections in El Salvador in 1950, Cuban dictator Fulgencio Batista took power in 1952. Honduras, where the land-holdings of the United Fruit Company were the most extensive, had been ruled by an anti-communist government sympathetic to the United States since 1932. These developments created tension between the other governments and Árbenz, which was exacerbated by Arévalo's support for the Caribbean Legion. This support also worried the United States and the newly formed Central Intelligence Agency. According to US historian Richard Immerman, during the beginning of the Cold War, the US and the CIA tended to assume that everybody who opposed it was a communist. Thus, despite Arévalo's ban of the communist party, important figures in the US government were already predisposed to believe that the revolutionary government had been infiltrated by communists, and was a danger to the US. During the years of the revolution, several reports and memoranda were circulated amongst US government agencies that furthered this belief.

=== Operation PBFortune ===
Although the administration of Harry Truman had become convinced that the Guatemalan government had been penetrated by communists, it relied on purely diplomatic and economic means to try and reduce the communist influence, at least until the end of its term. The United States had refused to sell arms to the Guatemalan government after 1944; in 1951 it began to block weapons purchases by Guatemala from other countries. In 1952 Truman became sufficiently convinced of the threat posed by Árbenz to start planning a covert overthrow, titled Operation PBFortune.

The plan had originally been suggested by the US-supported dictator of Nicaragua, Anastasio Somoza García, who said that if he were given weapons, he could overthrow the Guatemalan government. Truman gave the CIA permission to go ahead with the plan, without informing the Department of State. The CIA placed a shipment of weapons on a vessel owned by the United Fruit Company, and the operation was paid for by Rafael Trujillo and Marcos Pérez Jiménez, the right-wing anti-communist dictators of the Dominican Republic and Venezuela, respectively. The operation was to be led by Carlos Castillo Armas. However, the US Department of State discovered the conspiracy, and Secretary of State Dean Acheson persuaded Truman to abort the plan.

=== Operation PBSuccess ===
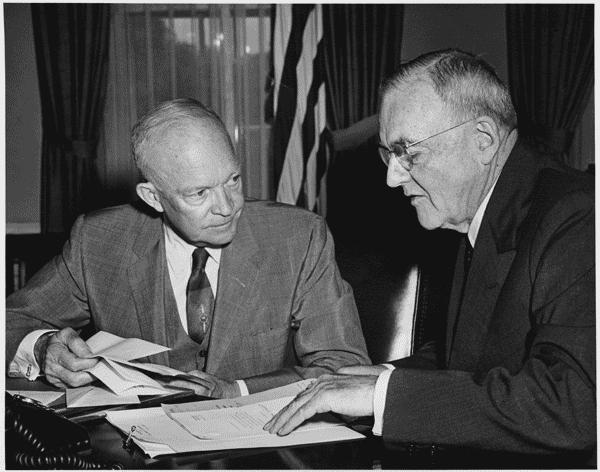
John Foster Dulles and US President Dwight Eisenhower

In November 1952, Dwight Eisenhower was elected president of the US. Eisenhower's campaign had included a pledge for a more active anti-communist policy. Several figures in his administration, including Secretary of State John Foster Dulles and his brother and CIA director Allen Dulles had close ties to the United Fruit Company. Both of these factors made Eisenhower predisposed to supporting the overthrow of Árbenz.

The CIA operation to overthrow Jacobo Árbenz, code-named Operation PBSuccess, was authorized by Eisenhower in August 1953. The operation was granted a budget of 2.7 million dollars for "psychological warfare and political action". The total budget has been estimated at between 5 and 7 million dollars, and the planning employed over 100 CIA agents. The CIA planning included drawing up lists of people within Árbenz's government to be assassinated if the coup were to be carried out. Manuals of assassination techniques were compiled, and lists were also made of people whom the junta would dispose of. After considering several candidates to lead the coup, including Miguel Ydígoras Fuentes, the CIA settled on Carlos Castillo Armas. The US state department also embarked on a campaign to ensure that other countries would not sympathize with the Guatemalan government, by linking it to communism and the Soviet Union. By 1954 Árbenz had become desperate for weapons, and decided to acquire them secretly from Czechoslovakia, which would have been the first time that a Soviet bloc country shipped weapons to the Americas. The shipment of these weapons acted as the final spur for the CIA to launch its coup.

=== Invasion ===
On 18 June 1954, Castillo Armas led a convoy of trucks carrying 480 men across the border from Honduras into Guatemala. The weapons had come from the CIA, which had also trained the men in camps in Nicaragua and Honduras.

Since his army was badly outnumbered by the Guatemalan army, the CIA plan required Castillo Armas to camp within the Guatemalan border, while it mounted a psychological campaign to convince the Guatemalan people and government that Castillo's victory was a fait accompli. This campaign included using Catholic priests to give anti-communist sermons, strafing several towns using CIA aircraft, and placing a naval blockade around the country. It also involved dropping leaflets by airplane through the country, and carrying out a radio broadcast entitled "The Voice of Liberation" which announced that Guatemalan exiles led by Castillo Armas were shortly about to liberate the country.

The military force led by Castillo Armas attempted to make forays towards the towns of Zacapa and Puerto Barrios; however, these were beaten back by the Guatemalan army. The propaganda broadcast by the CIA had far more effect; it succeeded in leading a Guatemalan pilot to defect, which led to Árbenz grounding the entire air force, fearing its defection. The CIA also used its planes, flown by American pilots, to bomb Guatemalan towns for psychological effect. When the old planes used by the invasion force were found to be inadequate, the CIA persuaded Eisenhower to authorize the use of two additional planes.

Guatemala made an appeal to the United Nations, but the US vetoed an investigation into the incident by the Security Council, stating that it was an internal matter in Guatemala. On 25 June, a CIA plane bombed Guatemala City, destroying the government's main oil reserves. Frightened by this, Árbenz ordered the army to distribute weapons to local peasants and workers. The army refused to do this, instead demanding that Árbenz either resign or come to terms with Castillo Armas.

Knowing that he could not fight on without the support of the army, Jacobo Árbenz resigned on 27 June 1954, handing over power to Colonel Carlos Enrique Diaz. US ambassador John Peurifoy then mediated negotiations held in El Salvador between the army leadership and Castillo Armas which led to Castillo being included in the ruling military junta on 7 July 1954, and was named provisional president a few days later. The US recognized the new government on 13 July. Elections were held in early October, from which all political parties were barred from participating, and Castillo Armas was the only candidate, winning the election with 99% of the vote. Among the outcomes of the meeting in El Salvador was a planned new constitution, which would roll back most of the progressive reforms brought by the revolution.

=== Aftermath ===
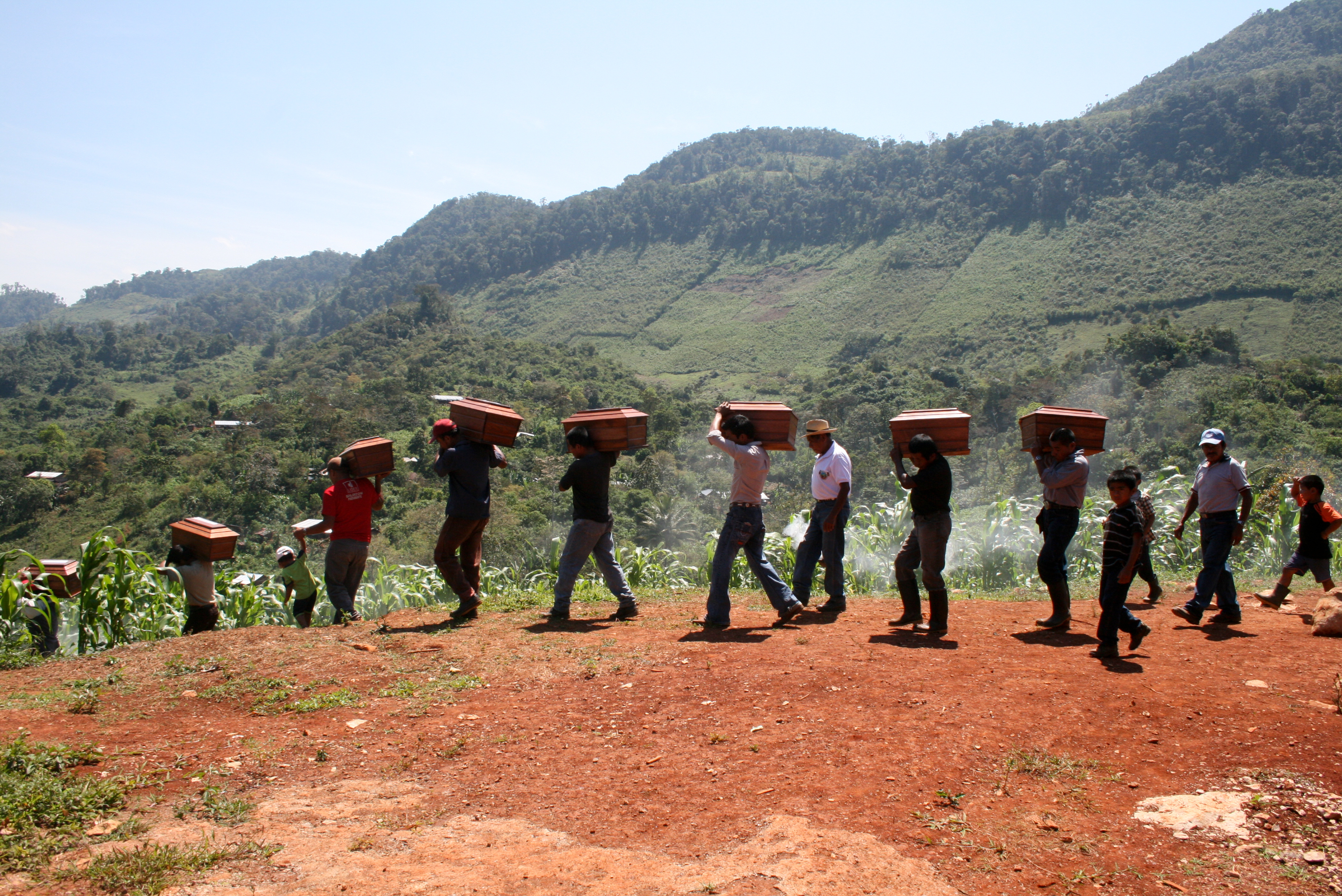
Ixil Maya carrying exhumed bodies of their relatives killed in the Guatemalan Civil War

Following the coup, hundreds of peasant leaders were rounded up and executed. Historian Greg Grandin has stated that "There is general consensus today among academics and Guatemalan intellectuals that 1954 signaled the beginning of what would become the most repressive state in the hemisphere". Following the coup and the establishment of the military dictatorship, a series of leftist insurgencies began in the countryside, frequently with a large degree of popular support, which triggered the Guatemalan Civil War that lasted until 1996. The largest of these movements was led by the Guerrilla Army of the Poor, which at its largest point had 270,000 members. Two-hundred thousand (200,000) civilians were killed in the war, and numerous human rights violations committed, including massacres of civilian populations, rape, aerial bombardment, and forced disappearances. Historians estimate that 93% of these violations were committed by the United States-backed military, which included a genocidal scorched-earth campaign against the indigenous Maya population in the 1980s.

== See also ==
- Banana republic
