= Presidential Honor Guard (Guatemala) =

Ceremonial unit in Guatemala

- Guardia de Honor Presidencial (Spanish)
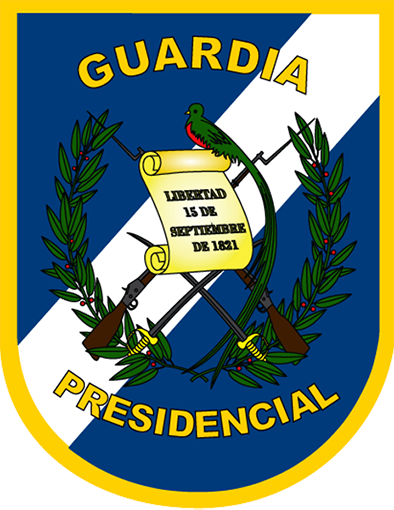
- Active: 29 January 1874; 151 years ago
- Country: Guatemala
- Allegiance: President and Vice President
- Branch: Armed Forces of Guatemala
- Type: Honor Guard
- Role: Ceremonial guard
- Garrison/HQ: Honor Guard Headquarters, Guatemala City

Commanders
- Commander-in-Chief: Bernardo Arévalo
- Commandant: Colonel of Aviation Henry Saenz Ramos

The Presidential Honor Guard (Spanish: Guardia de Honor Presidencial) is a branch of the Armed Forces of Guatemala, which is responsible for ceremonial duties of state as well as the protection of the President of Guatemala and his/her Vice President. It currently has its headquarters at Avenida De La Barranquilla.

== History ==
When it was established, it had its facilities on the 8th Street and 5th Avenue in Guatemala City, where the National Library is currently located. By general order on 29 January 1874, it was called the Honor Guard Barracks, with its first commander being General Julio García Granados. In 1884, it formed a military band. Between 1886 and 1891, during the government of Manuel Barillas, it was known as the 2nd Battalion. The battalion is where European influence of military bands in Guatemala, particularly when an Italian opera company arrived in the country in the latter half of the 19th century, bringing conductor Pietro Visoni to the country to be asked by President Miguel García Granados to take control of the bands of the 1st and 2nd battalions, after which Visoni merged the two and established the Martial Symphony Band, which is still in existence today. On 24 May 1891, it was referred to as the Honor Guard once again. It had several headquarters transfers, during the mandate of José María Orellana and Jorge Ubico, in 1940 it was named Infantry Regiment by General Ubico, It played a decisive role in the October 1944 Guatemalan Revolution, when military personnel, at command of Major Francisco Javier Arana, with heavy artillery, joined the popular movement and allowed the entrance of a group of 14 university students.

== Duties ==
The Presidential Guard is made up of around 350 military personnel, and forms the third security ring for the Guatemalan presidency. Since 1998, the security of the president and his/her family has been led by the Secretariat of Administrative Affairs of the Presidency and the Presidential General Staff. In April 2008, it was announced that it will be converted into a special anti-drug group.

== See also ==
- Presidential Honor Guard (Venezuela)
- Estado Mayor Presidencial
