= Jorge Toriello Garrido =

President of Guatemala

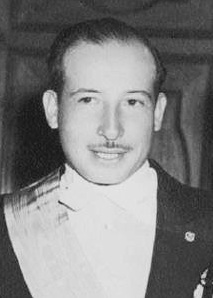

Head of State and Government of Guatemala
- In office October 20, 1944 – March 15, 1945 Serving with Jacobo Árbenz Guzmán and Francisco Javier Arana
- Preceded by: Federico Ponce Vaides
- Succeeded by: Juan José Arévalo

Personal details
- Born: April 23, 1908 Guatemala City, Guatemala
- Died: June 16, 1998 (aged 90) Guatemala City, Guatemala
- Spouse: María Leonor Saravia

Jorge Toriello Garrido (23 April 1908 – 16 June 1998) was one of the three leaders of the first government that ruled Guatemala from 20 October 1944 to 15 March 1945 as part of the October Revolution. Toriello Garrido, a civilian, led the government along with Captain Jacobo Arbenz Guzmán and Major Francisco Javier Arana after overthrowing the military regime of Juan Federico Ponce Vaides, who had temporarily taken over from ousted dictator Jorge Ubico. He was the Minister of Finance in 1945.

Jorge Toriello Garrido was the only citizen to lead the government after Ponce Vaides was overthrown. The Revolutionary Junta took possession of the National Palace at around 3 pm on October 20, of which Toriello Garrido was a part. On March 15, 1945, Toriello Garrido, alongside the other members of the Revolutionary Junta, passed control of the government to Dr. Juan José Arévalo Bermejo.
