= Juan Federico Ponce Vaides =

President of Guatemala from July 1944 until his popular overthrow in October 1944

General Juan Federico Ponce Vaides
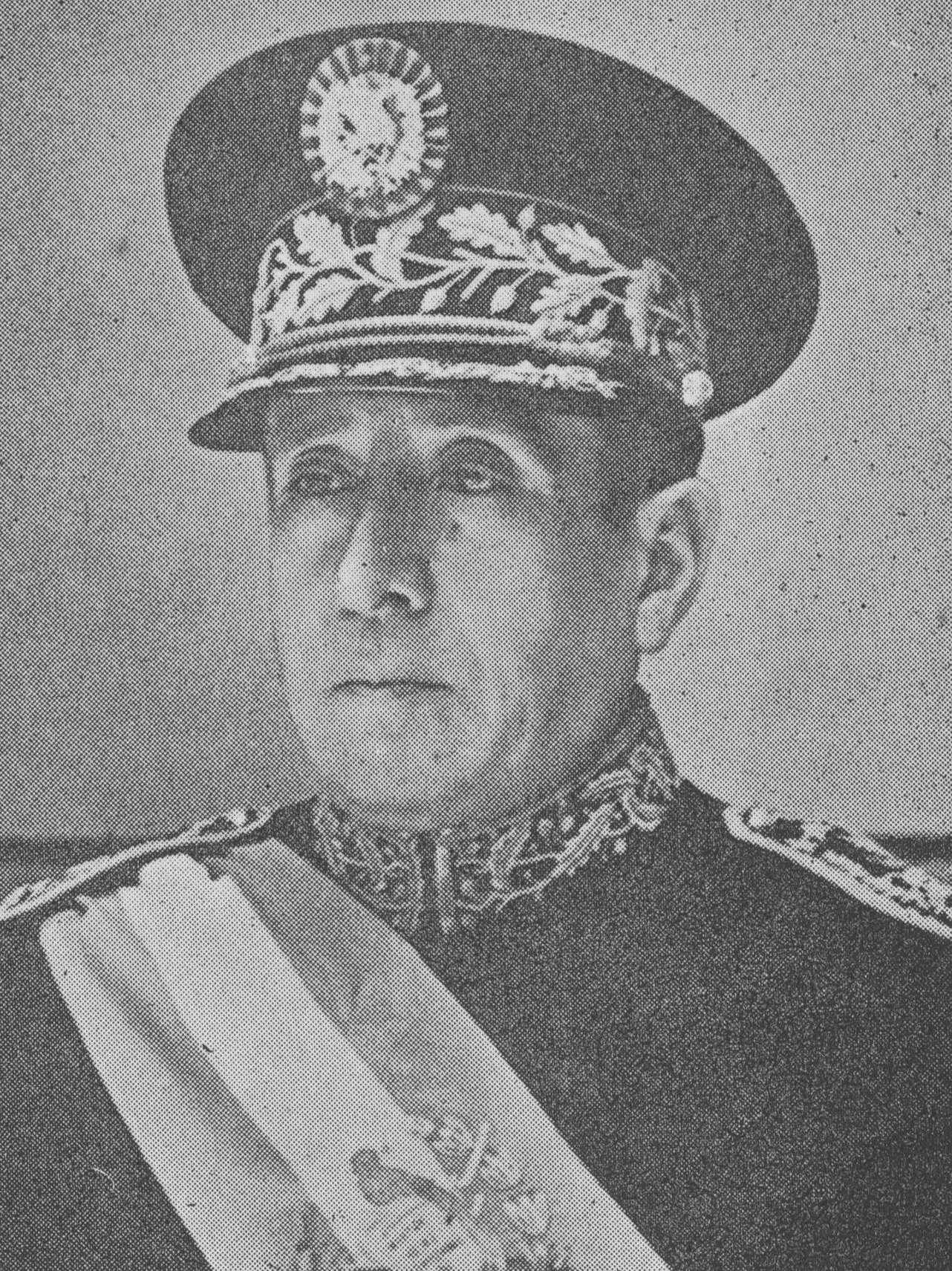
- Ponce Vaides in 1944

Acting President of Guatemala
- In office 4 July 1944 – 20 October 1944
- Preceded by: Jorge Ubico
- Succeeded by: Juan José Arévalo

Personal details
- Born: 26 August 1889
- Died: 16 November 1956 (aged 67)
- Party: Progressive Liberal Party
- Occupation: Military

Juan Federico Ponce Vaides (27 March 1889 – 29 January 1956) was the acting President of Guatemala from 4 July 1944 to 20 October 1944. He was overthrown by a popular uprising on 20 October 1944 that began the Guatemalan Revolution.

== Life ==
Ponce Vaides was born in a wealthy upper-class family in Cobán, Alta Verapaz. His father was Mariano Ponce Contreras, his mother Victoria Vaides Arrivillaga. During the government of Manuel Estrada Cabrera, Vaides took part in the National Campaign of 1906 against Honduras and El Salvador. After that, he became commander and political leader in different departments of state. After the downfall of Cabrera in 1920, he lost his brother, who was executed during a popular uprising.

== Presidency ==
Jorge Ubico, the dictator of Guatemala from 1931 to 1944, was forced to resign on 1 July 1944 by a popular pro-democracy movement. Ubico appointed three generals, Ponce Vaides, Eduardo Villagran Ariza, and Buenaventura Pineda, to a military junta to succeed him. On 3 July, Ponce Vaides forced the Guatemalan congress at gunpoint to appoint him interim president. Ponce pledged to hold free elections soon, while at the same time suppressing the protests. Freedom of the press was suspended, arbitrary detentions continued, and memorial services for slain revolutionaries were prohibited.

=== Instability ===
Protests had grown to the point where the government could not stamp them out, and rural areas also began protesting the dictatorship. The government began to use the police to intimidate the indigenous population to keep it in power through the forthcoming election, resulting in more support for an armed revolution. The army itself had also begun to be disillusioned by the junta, and progressives within it had begun to plot a coup.

On 1 October 1944, Alejandro Cordova, the editor of El Imparcial, the main opposition newspaper, was assassinated. This led to the military coup plotters reaching out to the leaders of the protests, in an attempt to turn the coup into a popular uprising.

=== Stabilization attempts ===
Ponce Vaides announced elections, but the pro-democracy forces denounced them, citing his attempts to rig them in his favor.

He attempted to stabilize his regime by playing on inter-racial tension within the Guatemalan population. The most vocal support for the revolution had come from people of mixed descent, or Ladinos and Ponce sought to exploit their fear of the Amerindians by paying thousands of Indigenous peasants to march in Guatemala city in his support, and promising them land of their own if they supported the Liberal party that Ubico had begun as a front for the dictatorship.

== Overthrow ==
By mid-October, several different plans to overthrow the junta had been set in motion by the various factions of the pro-democracy movement, including the teachers, the students, and the progressive factions of the army. On 19 October, the government learned of one of these conspiracies. The same day, a small group of army officers launched a coup from within the army, led by the coup-plotters Francisco Javier Arana and Jacobo Árbenz Guzmán. They were joined the next day, 20 October, by other factions of the army and the civilian population. Initially, the battle went against the revolutionaries, but after an appeal for support their ranks were swelled by unionists and students, they eventually subdued the police and the army factions loyal to Ponce Vaides, and Ponce Vaides surrendered unconditionally.

== Aftermath ==
Ponce Vaides and Ubico were allowed to leave the country safely. The military junta was replaced by another three-person junta consisting of Árbenz, Arana, and an upper-class youth named Jorge Toriello. The junta promised free and open elections to the presidency and the congress, as well as for a constituent assembly. The presidential elections were won by Juan José Arévalo, who began a series of social and economic reforms that constituted the Guatemalan Revolution.

Political offices
Preceded by Jorge Ubico	President of Guatemala; 1944	Succeeded by Juan José Arévalo
