= José Manuel Fortuny =

Guatemalan communist leader

- Born: 22 March 1916; Santa Rosa, Guatemala
- Died: 18 March 2005 (age 88); Mexico City, Mexico
- Other name: Ché Manuel
- Education: University of San Carlos
- Known for: Being an adviser to Jacobo Árbenz

José Manuel Fortuny Arana (22 March 1916 – 18 March 2005) was an important communist leader in Latin America. He became well known for his friendship with Guatemalan President Jacobo Árbenz, and was one of the main advisers in his government, which lasted from 1951–54. Árbenz was overthrown by a coup engineered by the United States in 1954, an event which drove Fortuny into exile, along with many of his comrades.

== Early life ==
José Manuel Fortuny was born to a middle-class family in the Guatemalan Department of Santa Rosa on 22 May 1916. He was a law student at the University of San Carlos of Guatemala, but did not graduate. Before becoming involved with politics, he had worked variously for the Sterling company, the British Legation, and the broadcaster journal Aire.

== Guatemalan Revolution ==
=== Revolutionary Action Party ===
The logo of the Partido Guatemalteco del Trabajo, co-founded by Fortuny

During the fall of Jorge Ubico and the beginning of the Guatemalan Revolution in 1944, Fortuny was vice president of the Student Association Law. He became a member of the Popular Front, and when that merged into the Revolutionary Action Party (Partido Acción Revolucionaria, or PAR) in 1945, he became the leader of the radical wing of the new organization. In 1946, several radical figures within the PAR made a successful effort to take over important leadership positions within the party. Fortuny, who was a member of this push, became the secretary general of the PAR. One year later, Fortuny and other young radical figures founded a covert group within the PAR called the Democratic Vanguard. In 1949, frustrated because he was unable to take complete control of the PAR, Fortuny founded the Partido Comunista de Guatemala (Communist Party of Guatemala). In 1952, this party merged with another communist faction led by Victor Manuel Gutierrez to form the Partido Guatemalteco del Trabajo (PGT), or the Guatemalan Party of Labor. Fortuny was General Secretary of the PGT until 1954.

=== Árbenz government ===
Fortuny played the role of friend and adviser to Árbenz through the three years of his government, from 1951 to 1954. Fortuny wrote several speeches for Árbenz, and in his role as agricultural secretary, he was involved in crafting Árbenz' landmark agrarian reform bill. Despite his position in Árbenz' government, however, Fortuny never became a popular figure in Guatemala, and did not have the sort of popular following that Gutierrez had. In 1952, Fortuny contested an election for the national Congress, but was heavily defeated. His manner was occasionally seen as offensive, and he was seen as putting the interests of the communist movement before those of the Guatemalan working class. Under his leadership, the communist party remained numerically weak, without any representation in Árbenz' cabinet.

Fortuny resigned along with Árbenz following the 1954 Guatemalan coup d'état, and went into exile.

== Exile and death ==
Following the U.S.-sponsored coup, Fortuny took refuge in the Mexican embassy for a while, before going into exile. Due to his status as a prominent communist during the Cold War, he was kept under surveillance by the Central Intelligence Agency. During his exile, he spent time in Brazil, Uruguay, and Cuba. He died in Mexico City at age 89, from heart failure.
