= 1948 Guatemalan parliamentary election =

Parliamentary elections were held in Guatemala between 26 and 28 November 1948 in order to elect half the seats in Congress. The National Renovation Party-Revolutionary Action Party alliance won the most seats, but the Popular Liberation Front remained the largest party.

== Results ==
Party	Seats	
Party	Won	Total
PRN–PAR	14	24
Popular Liberation Front	9	27
Workers Republican–Democratic Party	7	9
Patriotic Union	4	4
Independents	0	1
Vacant	–	3
Total	34	68

== Bibliography ==
- Villagrán Kramer, Francisco. Biografía política de Guatemala: años de guerra y años de paz. FLACSO-Guatemala, 2004.
- Political handbook of the world 1948. New York, 1949.
- Elections in the Americas A Data Handbook Volume 1. North America, Central America, and the Caribbean. Edited by Dieter Nohlen. 2005.
- Gleijeses, Piero. 1991. Shattered hope. The Guatemalan Revolution and the United States, 1944-1954. Princeton: Princeton University Press.
- Rodríguez de Ita, Guadalupe. 2003. La participación política en la primavera guatemalteca: una aproximación a la historia de los partidos durante el periodo 1944-1954. México: Universidad Autónoma del Estado de México, Universidad Nacional Autónoma de México.
