= Manuel María Orellana Contreras =

Guatemalan army officer and politician

General of Division Manuel María Orellana Contreras
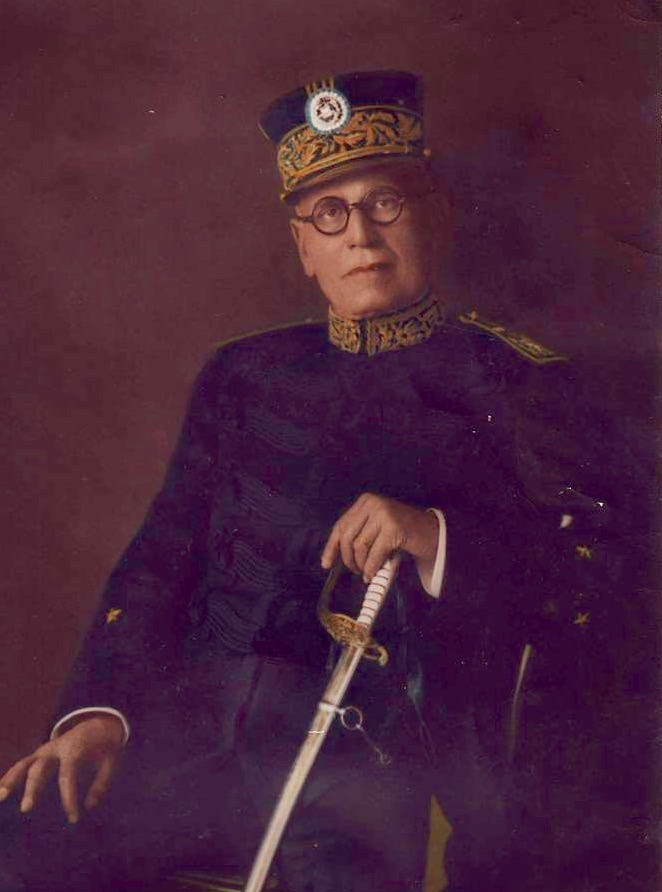
- General Orellana Contreras

President of Guatemala
- De facto
- In office 12:00, 17 December 1930 – 2 January 1931
- Preceded by: Baudilio Palma
- Succeeded by: José María Reina Andrade

Personal details
- Born: 17 December 1870 El Jícaro, Guatemala
- Died: 16 June 1940 (aged 69) Barcelona, Spain
- Party: Liberal

Manuel María Orellana Contreras (17 December 1870 in El Jícaro, Guatemala – 17 June 1940 in Barcelona, Spain) was a Guatemalan army officer and politician, and from 17 to 31 December 1930, de facto interim President of Guatemala, after leading a coup d'état that ended Baudilio Palma's interim presidency. Palma, in turn, had been appointed president only four days earlier, when president Lázaro Chacón González suffered a stroke and was forced to resign. At the time the coup took place, Orellana Contreras was commander of the San Rafael de Matamoros Fort in Guatemala City.

== Coup d'état against Baudilio Palma ==
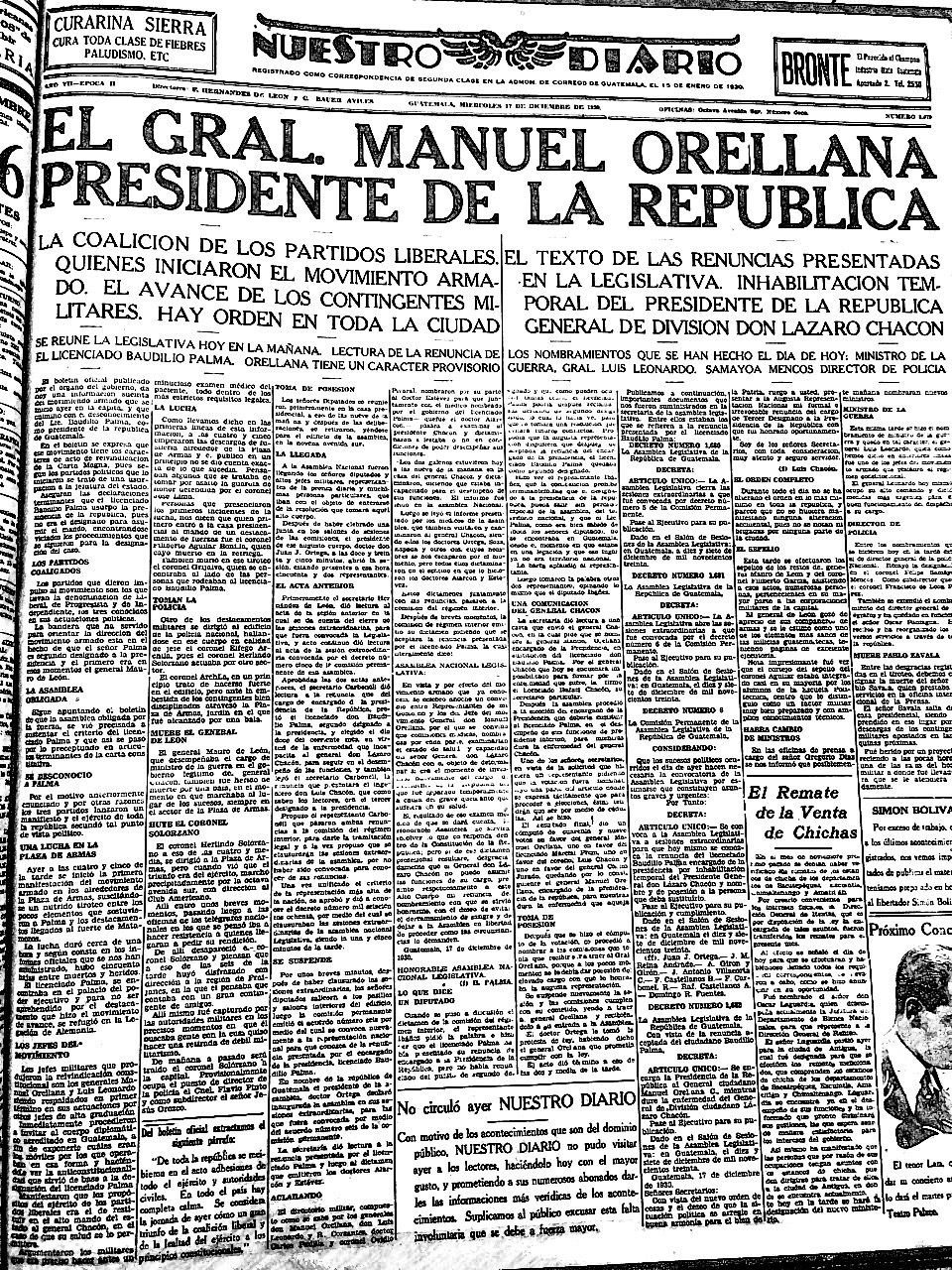
Front page of the Guatemalan newspaper Nuestro Diario, where the news of the coup d'état led by Orellana Contreras is reported.

In December, 1930 the following events occurred in rapid succession:

- On 12 December, General Chacón suffers a stroke that forces him to resign.
- General Mauro de León, first designated successor to the Presidency apparently resigns.
- Lawyer and cabinet member Baudilio Palma, second designated successor, is appointed interim President.

However, on 16 December 1930 a coup d'état led by General Orellana Contreras and Luis Leonardo forced Palma to resign after a short battle inside the Presidential Palace. During the fight, which lasted no more than an hour, both Palma and Mauro de León died. The Liberal Progresista party placed General Roderico Anzueto in the key position of Chief of Police. (Note: Anzueto would eventually become one of President Jorge Ubico's main supporters during his 13-year presidency.)

== Presidency ==
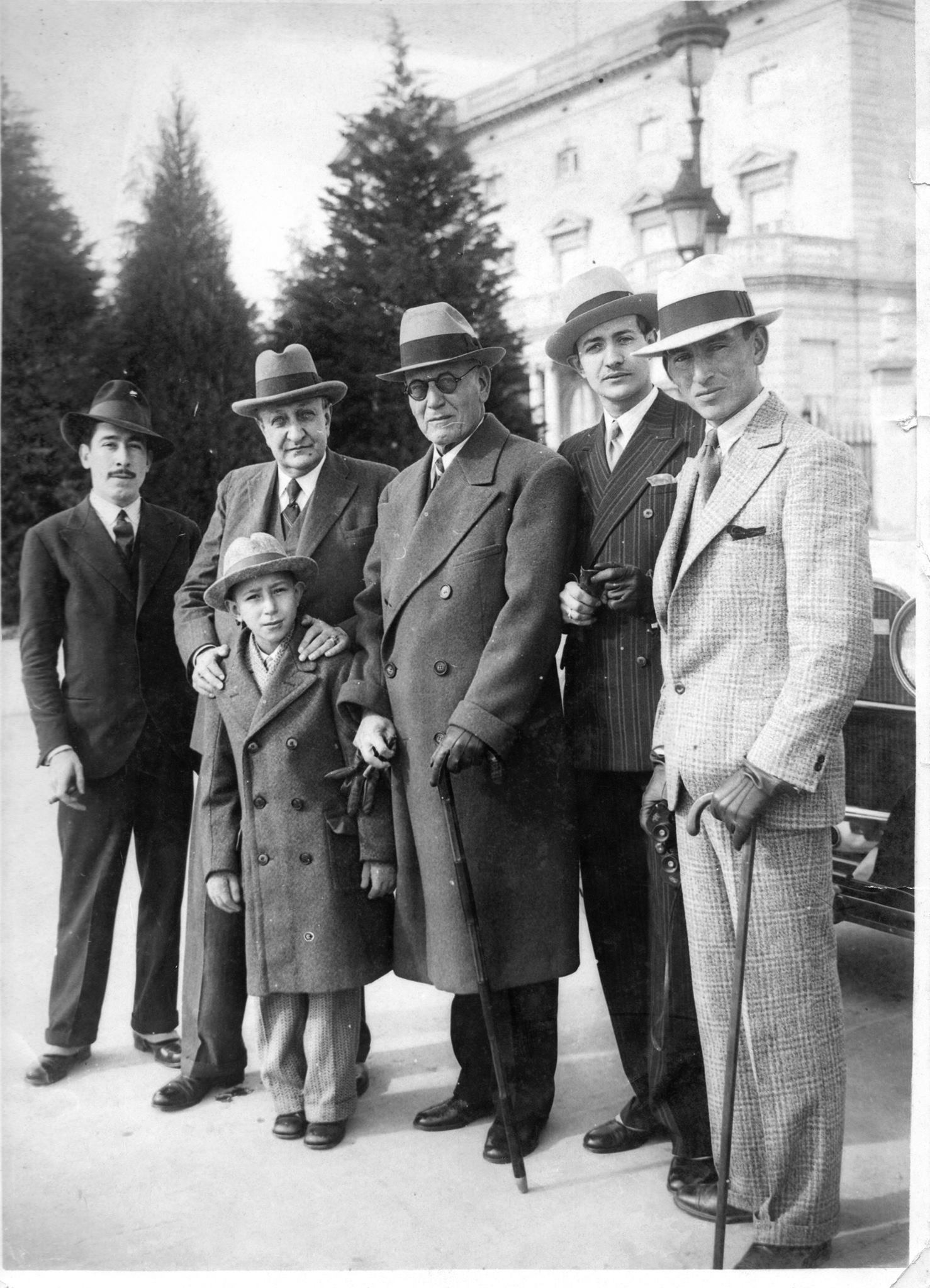
General Orellana Contreras (center) with some relatives in Barcelona, ca. 1938.

Once in power, Orellana Contreras reformed the Cabinet and worked on restructuring Guatemalan military bases. However, given the large investments that U.S. companies had in Guatemala—especially the United Fruit Company, U.S. Secretary of State Henry Stimson publicly denounced Orellana as an unconstitutional leader and demanded his removal. Realizing that the Americans would not recognize his government, Orellana Contreras resigned on 29 December. Stimson sent Ambassador Sheldon Whitehouse (grandfather of the future U.S. senator) to tell Orellana Contreras that his country would not be dealing with the new Guatemalan president whatsoever. Whitehouse pressed the National Assembly to force Orellana Contreras to resign, taking advantage of his lack of political experience and making clear that the U.S. government needed a stable (i.e. U.S.-loyal) regime in Guatemala.

== After leaving power ==
Orellana Contreras was a cousin of General José María Orellana Pinto, a former president who had been President Manuel Estrada Cabrera's chief of staff and who had appointed General Jorge Ubico as chief of his secret police while in office. Ubico, the new president, commissioned Orellana Contreras as military attaché in the Guatemalan Embassy in Spain, where he worked until his death on 17 June 1940.

== See also ==
- Baudilio Palma
- Jorge Ubico
- José María Orellana
- Lázaro Chacón
- United Fruit Company

== Bibliography ==
- Aquí Guatemala (2008). "Biografía de Manuel María Orellana". Aquí Guatemala (in Spanish). Guatemala. Archived from the original on 6 February 2008.
- Bucheli, Marcelo; Jones, Geoffrey (2005). "The Octopus and the Generals: the United Fruit Company in Guatemala". Harvard Business School Case (9–805–146). Archived from the original on 11 July 2018.
- Díaz Romeu, Guillermo (1996). "Del régimen de Carlos Herrera a la elección de Jorge Ubico". Historia general de Guatemala. 1993–1999 (in Spanish). 5. Guatemala: Asociación de Amigos del País, Fundación para la Cultura y el Desarrollo: 37–42. Archived from the original on 12 January 2015.
- Dosal, Paul J. (1993). Doing business with the dictators: a political history of United Fruit in Guatemala, 1899-1944. Wilmington: Scholarly Resources.
- Nuestro Diario (13 December 1930a). "Presidente Lázaro Chacón obligado a renunciar a la presidencia por enfermedad". Nuestro Diario (in Spanish). Guatemala.
- — (17 December 1930b). "Alzados deponen al presidente Palma". Nuestro Diario (in Spanish). Guatemala.
- — (18 December 1930c). "El general Manuel María Orellana presidente de la República". Nuestro Diario (in Spanish). Guatemala.
- Time (1930). "Wrong horse No. 2". Time magazine. United States.
- — (1931). "We are not amused". Time magazine. United States. Archived from the original on 15 December 2008.
- — (1931b). "Died. General Lazaro Chacon, 56, President of Guatemala". Time magazine. United States. Archived from the original on 15 December 2008.

Political offices
Preceded by Baudilio Palma	President of Guatemala; 1930	Succeeded by José María Reina Andrade
