= Lázaro Chacón González =

Guatemalan politician and President

General of Division Lázaro Chacón González
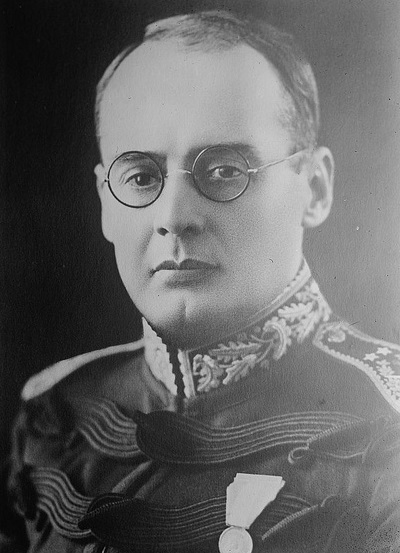
- Chacón in 1915

President of Guatemala
- In office 26 September 1926 – 12 December 1930
- Vice President: First Vice President: Miguel Larrave Mauro de León Rodolfo A. Mendoza Mario León; Second Vice President: Federico Aguilar Valenzuela Mauro De León Rodolfo Sandoval Arturo Ramirez Baudilio Palma
- Preceded by: José María Orellana
- Succeeded by: Baudilio Palma

First Vice President of Guatemala
- In office 28 April 1925 – 18 December 1926
- President: José María Orellana
- Preceded by: Aurelio Recinos
- Succeeded by: Miguel Larrave

Personal details
- Born: 27 June 1873 Teculután, Zacapa, Guatemala
- Died: 8 April 1931 (aged 57) New Orleans, Louisiana, US
- Party: Unionist Party
- Spouse: Josefina de Chacón
- Children: Lázaro Chacón, Alfredo Chacón, Gilberto Chacón
- Profession: General and Politician

Lázaro Chacón González (27 June 1873 – 9 April 1931) was the acting President of Guatemala from 26 September 1926 to 18 December 1926 and President of Guatemala from 19 December 1926 to 2 January 1931.

Born in Teculután, Zacapa he was the son of Juan José Chacón Paiz and Soledad González Paiz who died during his birth. He is grandson of José Deciderio Chacón and María del Rosario Paiz, and also grandson of Vicente González Chacón and Josefa Paiz Cordón.

Chacón's aunt, Cleta Chacón became his adopted mother. He married Josefina Pazos.

== Interim president ==
On 25 May 1926, El Imparcial -a private newspaper- had published a news flash: Martial law enacted which referred to executive decree 916, in which President Orellana had suspended the individual guarantees contained in the Constitution; the main reason for such decision was that "insidious and unpatriotic activities of certain elements" tended "to disrupt the peace and development of the country", which, at once, made it impossible to solve the national economic problem. Although El Imparcial was not circulating regularly in the previous days due to a government boycott, after May 26 it ceased publication indefinitely. Thereafter, only the official news outlets, such as Diario de Centro América and El Guatemalteco, could circulate, carrying irrelevant information. The story took a sudden turn on Sunday September 26, when, at 0:15 pm, Orellana died during a vacation trip to Antigua Guatemala; he was in a room at Hotel Manchén. "A violent angina attack ended the life of our illustrious president," explained Diario de Centro America in a special edition that day. These strange circumstances led to the suspicion that he was poisoned. General Lázaro Chacón assumed as interim President and immediately lifted Martial Law and allowed private newspaper to be published again.

== Presidency ==
Chacón was first appointed to the position of Chairman and interim president following the death of General José María Orellana. He then called for elections in which his main opponent was general Jorge Ubico. Chacón defeated Ubico thanks in part to the strong campaign that journalist Clemente Marroquín Rojas made against the latter in his column called Desnudando al ídolo. (Note: Desnudando al ídolo= Showing the idol as he really is.) Chacón government took some liberties such as creating the National Mortgage Bank (Crédito Hipotecario Nacional) as well as constructing the Faculty of Medicine building for the Faculty of Natural Sciences. During his tenure the Legislative Palace and the national railroad were also completed. During his presidency, the Guatemalan currency was stabilized, but Guatemala suffered the effects of the Great Depression in 1929.

=== Stroke and resignation ===
Beginning in December, 1930 the following events occurred in a rapid succession:

- On 12 December, General Chacón suffers a stroke that forces him to resign.
- General Mauro de León, first designated successor to the Presidency apparently resigns.
- Lawyer and cabinet member Baudilio Palma, second designated successor, is appointed interim President.
- On 17 December 1930 a coup d'etat led by general Manuel María Orellana Contreras (Note: First cousin of late former president José María Orellana.) forces Palma to resign after a short battle inside the Presidential Palace. During the fight, that lasted no more than an hour, both Palma and Mauro de León died. The Liberal Progresista party places general Roderico Anzueto in the key position of Chief of Police. (Note: Anzueto would eventually become one of President Jorge Ubico main supporters during his 14 year presidency.)
- On 2 January 1931 José María Reina Andrade is appointed interim President, after the foreign nations representatives refuse to deal with Orellana Contreras and calls for presidential elections.
- On 7 February 1931, general Jorge Ubico Castañeda wins the elections and is sworn as President. The Liberal Party joined with the Progressives to nominate Ubico as Andrade's successor, and although he was the only candidate on the ballot, he received 305,841 votes in February 1931. In his inaugural address, he pledged a "march toward civilization". Once in office, he began a campaign of efficiency that included assuming dictatorial power.

== Death and legacy ==
Chacón died in New Orleans, Louisiana, United States on 9 April 1931 at age 57 as a consequence of his stroke.

His granddaughter Josefina Chacon de Machado was a magistrate and President of the Guatemalan Supreme Court.

His grandson Carlos Gilberto Chacon Torrebiarte was also magistrate and President of the Guatemalan Supreme Court.

== Notes and references ==
=== Bibliography ===
- Aqui Guatemala (n.d.). "Lázaro Chacón". Aqui Guatemala (in Spanish). Guatemala. Archived from the original on 27 January 2011.
- Asociación de Amigos del País (2004). Diccionario histórico biográfico de Guatemala (in Spanish) (1st ed.). Guatemala: Amigos del País, Fundación para la Cultura y el Desarrollo. ISBN 99922-44-01-1.
- Díaz Romeu, Guillermo (1996). "Del régimen de Carlos Herrera a la elección de Jorge Ubico". Historia general de Guatemala. 1993–1999 (in Spanish). 5. Guatemala: Asociación de Amigos del País, Fundación para la Cultura y el Desarrollo: 37–42. Archived from the original on 12 January 2015.
- Red Boa (2012). "Historia del Diario de Centro América" (PDF). Foro Red Boa (in Spanish). Archived from the original (PDF) on 20 July 2014.
- Fuentes Oliva, Regina (September 2012). "1920, una década de cambios educativos para Guatemala". Boletín AFEHC (in Spanish) (54).
- Hernández de León, Federico (December 1930). "Golpe de Estado contra presidente Baudilio Palma". Nuestro Diario (in Spanish). Guatemala.
- — (1930a). El Libro de las Efemérides (in Spanish). Guatemala: Tipografía Sánchez y de Guise.
- Ishlaj Conde de González, Y.A. (2006). Clemente Marroquín Rojas, su vida y su obra (PDF) (in Spanish). Guatemala: Tesis; Universidad de San Carlos.
- Villagrán Kramer, Francisco (1993). Biografía política de Guatemala (in Spanish). Vol. 1 (3rd ed.). Guatemala: FLACSO. p. 411. ISBN 9789993972815.
- Villalobos Viato, Roberto (August 2013). "La noticia nunca publicada por El Imparcial". Prensa Libre (in Spanish). Guatemala. Archived from the original on 29 August 2013.
- Time (1930). "Wrong horse No. 2". Time magazine. US.
- — (1931). "We are not amused". Time magazine. US. Archived from the original on 15 December 2008.

Political offices
Preceded by José María Orellana	President of Guatemala; 1926–1931	Succeeded by Baudilio Palma (acting)
