= Baudilio Palma =

Guatemalan politician (1880–1930?)

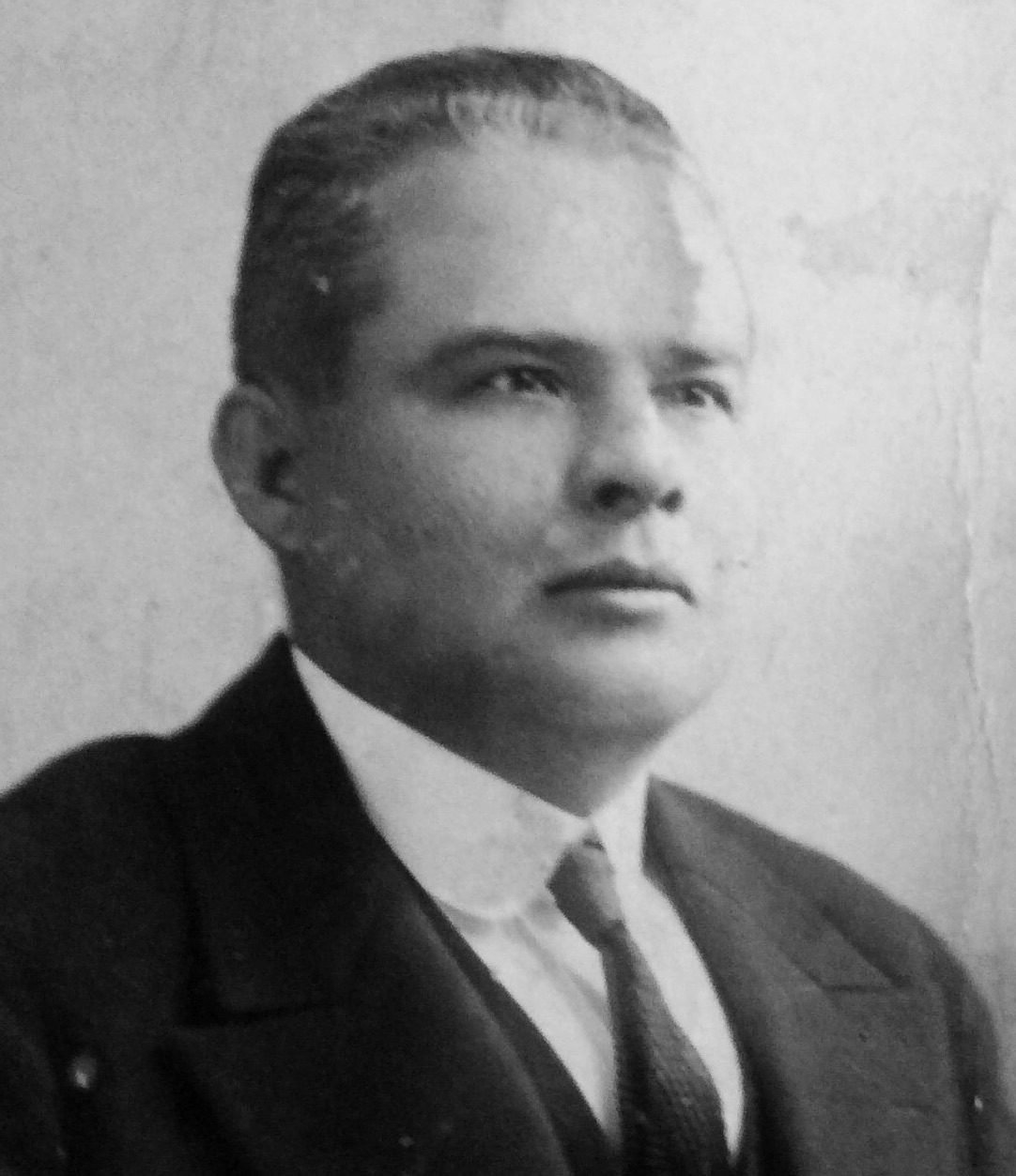
- Licenciado Baudilio Palma; Third civilian to serve as President of Guatemala

President of Guatemala
- Acting
- In office 13 December 1930 – 17 December 1930
- Preceded by: Lázaro Chacón González
- Succeeded by: Manuel María Orellana Contreras

Secretary of Finance
- In office 1926–1927
- President: Lázaro Chacón González
- Preceded by: Carlos O. Zachrisson
- Succeeded by: Rafael Felipe Solares

Personal details
- Born: 10 June 1874 or 1880 (Note: Asociación de Amigos del País 2004. There are discrepancies regarding Palma's birth date; some author say that he was born in 1874 and other in 1880.) Santa Catarina Mita, Jutiapa, Guatemala
- Died: 17 December 1930 or 19 June 1944 Guatemala City, Guatemala
- Party: Conservative
- Spouse: Luz Castañeda Godoy
- Parent(s): Sisto de Jesús Palma Ramos and Arcadia Palma Flandes
- Education: University of San Carlos of Guatemala

Baudilio Palma (Santa Catarina Mita, Jutiapa, 1874 – Guatemala City, 17 December 1930 (Note: Asociación de Amigos del País 2004. Like with his birth date, his death date is also under discussion; there are several theories on what happened to him after the coup d'état in December 1930: some authors argue that he was able to flee to El Salvador – where he would have died on 19 June 1944 – after asking for asylum in some European Embassy, while others say that the most likely scenario was that he was killed once he signed his resignation.)) was acting President of Guatemala, in place of general Lázaro Chacón González, from 13 to 17 December 1930, when he was deposed and probably assassinated after coup d'état led by general Manuel María Orellana Contreras, who appointed himself as president. Several authors argue that he might not have been killed, but went into exile to El Salvador, where he would have died on 19 June 1944.

== Biography ==
Palma was born in the small village of Santa Catarina Mita, in the Jutiapa Department of Guatemala. He graduated high school in Guatemala City, in the Escuela Normal para Varones, part of the then prestigious National Central Institute for boys, where he obtained both a teacher and a high school diplomas. In 1894 he started his law degree in the College of Law of the National University, graduating in 1897.

He practiced law in Jalapa and Zacapa. He took a case that irritated president José María Reina Barrios, who sent him to prison for two months. Upon release, he worked with opposition candidates – mainly José León Castillo -, but could not avoid that Reina Barrios extended his presidential term. After Reina Barrios assassination in 1898, he went back to practice law; however, when he had to defend his brother Abraham against some member of president Manuel Estrada Cabrera staff in 1906, he was forced to go into exile.

He settled in San Pedro Sula, Honduras where he lived for fourteen years, returning to Guatemala after the events that brought down president Estrada Cabrera in April 1920. During the brief presidencies of both Carlos Herrera y Luna and José María Orellana he kept to himself and his personal business; but in 1926, elected president Lázaro Chacón (who was a friend of Palma's) invited him to join the presidential cabinet, as Secretary of Finance.

== Presidency ==
=== Rise to power ===
Besides being the Secretary of Finance, Baudilio Palma was also the second designated to the office of the Presidency in case general Lázaro Chacón González was to die. When Chacón suffered a stroke that kept him from performing his presidential duties, Palma, supposedly in agreement with the rest of the cabinet, was appointed acting president, even though he was the second designated and not the first. According to the official communications at the time, the first designated to the office was general Mauro de León, but he had resigned in favor of Palma.

=== Coup d'état ===
However, on 16 December 1930 a coup d'état led by General Orellana Contreras and Luis Leonardo forced Palma to resign after a short battle inside the Presidential Palace. During the fight, that lasted no more than an hour, Mauro de León died. The Liberal Progresista party placed general Roderico Anzueto in the key position of Chief of Police. (Note: Anzueto would eventually become one of President Jorge Ubico main supporters during his 14-year presidency.)

Once in power, Orellana Contreras reformed the Cabinet and worked on restructuring the Guatemalan military bases. However, given the large investments that American companies had in Guatemala -especially the United Fruit Company, the United States Secretary of State Henry Stimson publicly denounced Orellana as an unconstitutional leader and demanded his removal. Realizing that the Americans would not recognize his government, Orellana resigned on 29 December. Stimson sent Ambassador Sheltom Whitehouse to tell Orellana Contreras that his country would not be dealing with the new Guatemalan president whatsoever. Whitehouse pressed the National Assembly to force Orellana Contreras to resign, taking advantage of Orellana's lack of political experience, and the American government needed a stable regime in Guatemala.

== Notes ==
Political offices
Preceded by Lázaro Chacón	President of Guatemala; 1930	Succeeded by Manuel María Orellana Contreras
