= Jorge Ubico =

President of Guatemala from 1931 to 1944

General of Division Jorge Ubico
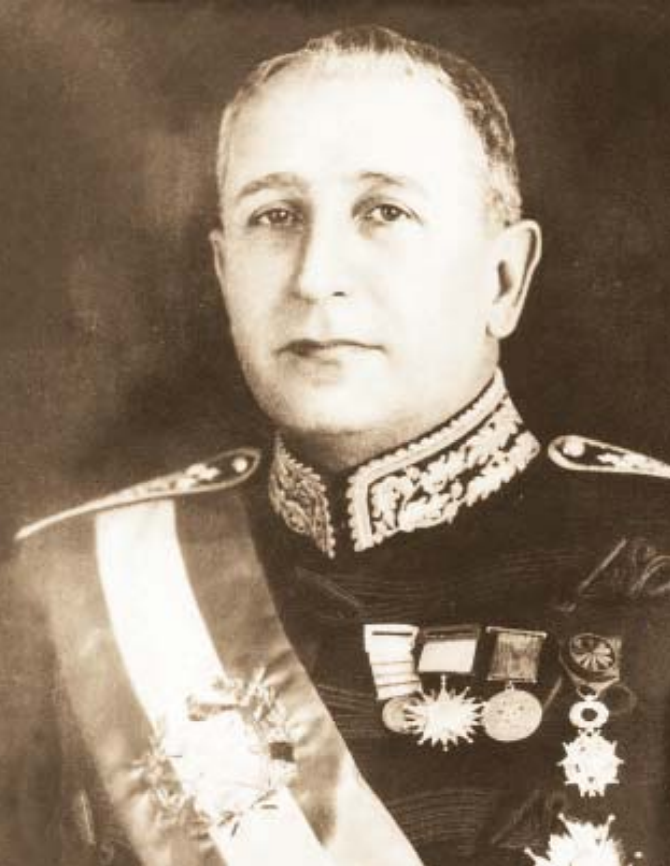
- Ubico Castañeda in 1931

21st President of Guatemala
- In office 14 February 1931 – 1 July 1944
- Preceded by: José María Reina
- Succeeded by: Juan Federico Ponce Vaides

Leader of the Progressive Liberal Party
- In office 1922 – 1 July 1944
- Succeeded by: Juan Federico Ponce Vaides

Personal details
- Born: 10 November 1878 Guatemala City, Guatemala
- Died: 14 June 1946 (aged 67) New Orleans, Louisiana, U.S.
- Cause of death: Lung cancer
- Party: Progressive Liberal Party
- Spouse(s): Marta Lainfiesta Dorión (m. 1905–1946); his death
- Profession: Soldier
- Nickname(s): Number Five; Central America's Napoleon

Military service
- Allegiance: Guatemala
- Branch/service: Armed Forces of Guatemala
- Years of service: 1896–1944
- Rank: General
- Battles/wars: Second and Third Totoposte Wars; 1921 Guatemalan coup d'état

Jorge Ubico Castañeda (10 November 1878 – 14 June 1946), nicknamed Number Five or also Central America's Napoleon, was a Guatemalan military officer, politician, and dictator who served as the president of Guatemala from 1931 to 1944.

A general in the Guatemalan military, he was elected to the presidency in 1931, in an election where he was the only candidate. He continued his predecessors' policies of giving massive concessions to the United Fruit Company and wealthy landowners, as well as supporting their harsh labor practices. Ubico has been described as "one of the most oppressive tyrants Guatemala has ever known" who compared himself to Adolf Hitler. He was removed by a pro-democracy uprising in 1944, which led to the ten-year Guatemalan Revolution.

== Early years ==
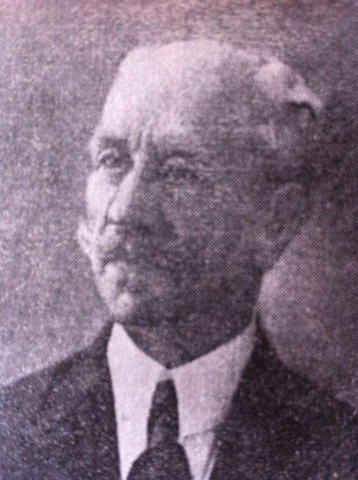
Arturo Ubico Urruela, father of General Ubico.

Jorge Ubico was the son of Arturo Ubico Urruela, a lawyer and politician of the Guatemalan Liberal Party. Ubico Urruela was a member of the legislature that wrote the Guatemalan Constitution of 1879, and was subsequently the president of the Guatemalan Congress during the government of Manuel Estrada Cabrera (1898–1920). Jorge Ubico was privately tutored, and attended some of Guatemala's most prestigious schools, as well as receiving further education in the United States and Europe.

By 1897 Ubico received his commission into the Guatemalan army as a second lieutenant, a commission which was largely due to his political connections. He rapidly established himself in the army and rose through the ranks, and, after a military campaign against El Salvador, held the rank of colonel at the age of 28. A year later, he was made the governor (jefe politico) of the province of Alta Verapaz, followed four years later as governor of Retalhuleu.

During his tenure, he oversaw improvements in public works, the school system, public health, and youth organizations. In 1918, he drained swamps, ordered fumigation and distributed free medicine to combat a yellow fever epidemic, and won the praise of Major General William C. Gorgas, who had done the same in Panama. However, most of his reputation came from his harsh but effective punishment of banditry and smuggling across the Mexican border.

He returned to Guatemala City in 1921 to participate in a coup that installed General José María Orellana into the presidency, after the sitting president Carlos Herrera refused to ratify the concessions that Estrada Cabrera had made to the United Fruit Company. Under Orellana he was appointed Secretary of War in 1922, but quit a year later. In 1926, after the death of President Orellana, Ubico ran unsuccessfully for president as the candidate of the Political Progressive Party. He temporarily retired to his farm until the next election.

== Guatemalan instability ==
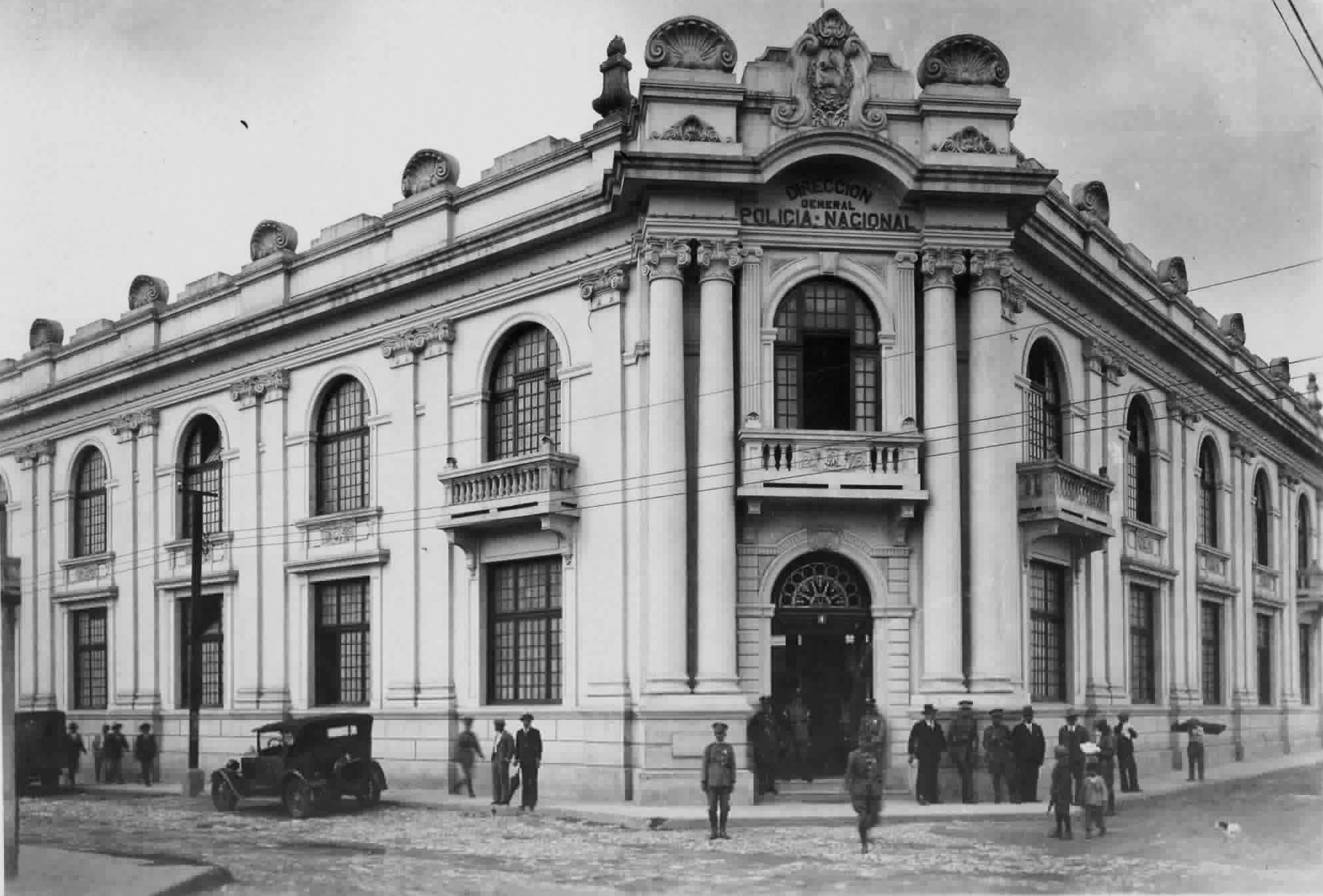
The National Police Headquarters during Ubico's regime.

In December 1930, President Lázaro Chacón González was forced to resign after having a stroke. By that time, Guatemala was in the midst of the Great Depression and bankrupt; Chacón's successor, Baudilio Palma, was deposed by a coup d'état after only four days in office and was replaced by Gen. Manuel Orellana. The United States opposed the new government and demanded Orellana resign; he was forced to leave the presidency in favor of José María Reina Andrade.

== Election ==
The Liberal Party allied with the Progressives to nominate Ubico as Andrade's successor, in an election where Ubico was the only candidate on the ballot. In February 1931 he was elected with 305,841 votes. In his inaugural address, he pledged a "march toward civilization". Once in office, he began a campaign of efficiency which included assuming dictatorial powers.

== Government ==
=== Military dictatorship ===
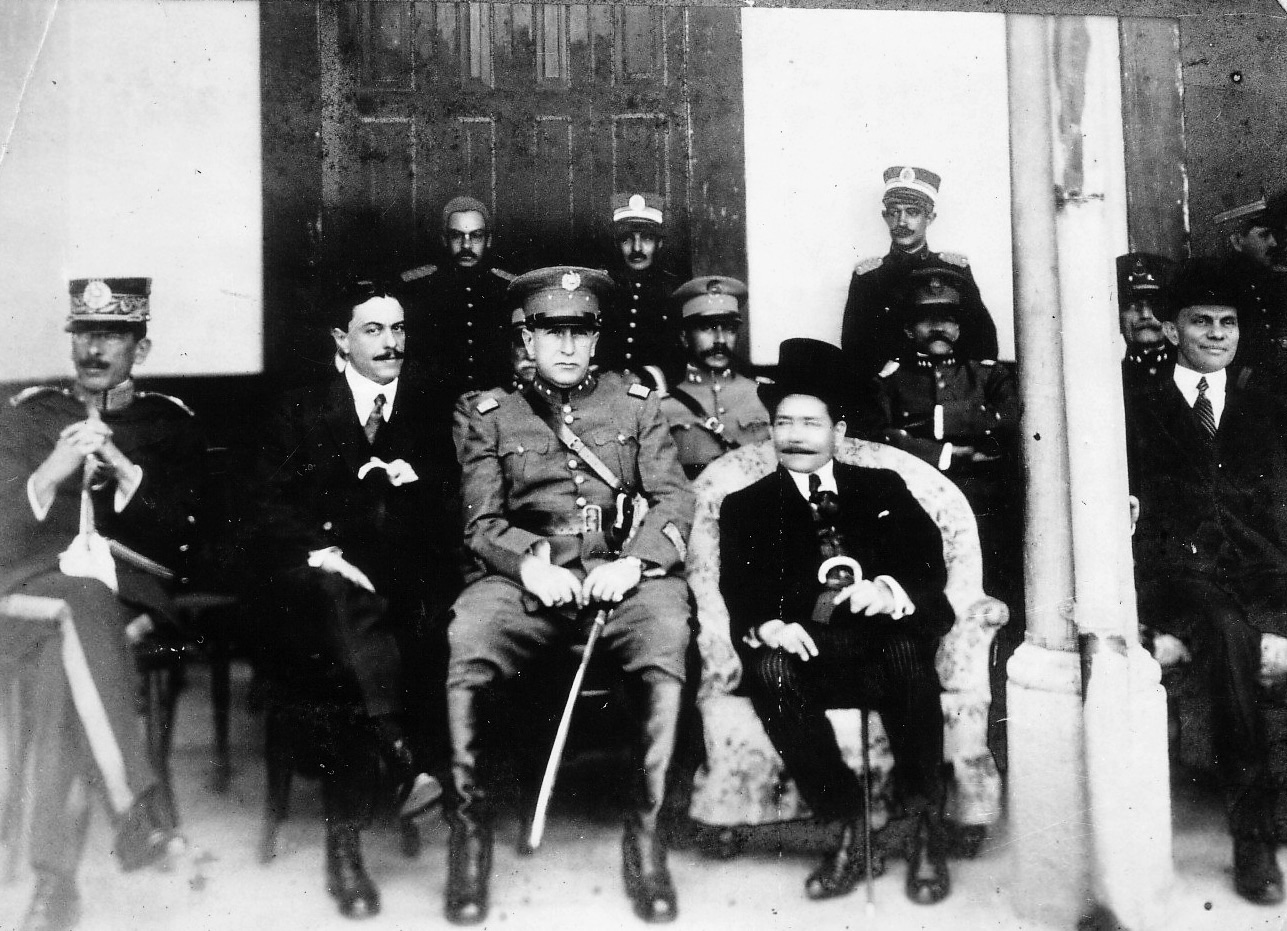
General Ubico with several of his collaborators.

Ubico's rule has been characterized as totalitarian; John Gunther, who visited the country during 1941, described Guatemala as "a country 100 per cent dominated by a single man." Added Gunther: "He [Ubico] has spies and agents everywhere, and knows everyone's private business to an amazing degree. Not a pin drops in Guatemala without his knowing it." Guatemala under Ubico was likened to "a modern jail."

He militarized numerous political and social institutions – including the post office, schools, and symphony orchestras – and placed military officers in charge of many government posts. He frequently traveled around the country performing "inspections" in dress uniform followed by a military escort, a mobile radio station, an official biographer, and cabinet members.

=== The United Fruit Company and relations with the US ===
Ubico considered Guatemala to be the closest ally of the United States in Central America. Adopting a pro-USA stance to promote economic development and recovery from depression, Ubico permitted the United Fruit Company to become the most important company in Guatemala. It received import duty and real estate tax exemptions from the government and controlled more land than any other group or individual. It also controlled the sole railroad in the country, the sole facilities capable of producing electricity, and the port facilities at Puerto Barrios on the Atlantic coast.

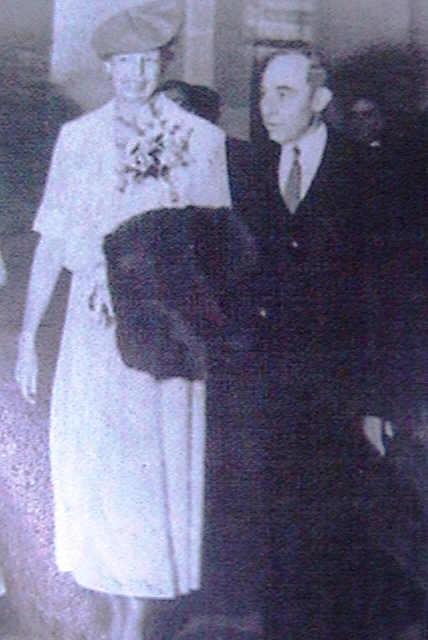
Eleanor Roosevelt and Jorge Ubico

==== Railways and ports: the United Fruit Company ====
The United Fruit Company (UFCO) supported General Ubico's rise to power, and the president subsequently became closely aligned with the multinational corporation. The national railway system and the port facilities of Puerto Barrios operated under a concession granted to the International Railways of Central America (IRCA), which was controlled by the UFCO. IRCA imposed very high transportation rates and did not generate profits for the Guatemalan government.

The UFCO effectively became a state within a state as a result of extensive concessions of plantation land along Guatemala's Pacific coast, particularly in Tiquisate, as well as tax exemptions, duty-free importation of necessary goods, guarantees of low wages for its employees, and concessions over public services such as the railway system.

The Guatemalan writer and playwright Manuel Galich—who served as Minister of Education and ambassador under the revolutionary governments of Juan José Arévalo and Jacobo Árbenz—described the operation of the railway and Puerto Barrios concessions granted to IRCA and the UFCO as follows:

Finance is a kind of extraordinary magic. A pile of old papers is transformed into millions of dollars. Here is how:

This pile of papers consists of bonds from an old government debt, on which neither principal nor interest has been paid. Naturally they are worth nothing, and we, the bondholders, acquired them for almost nothing. We propose an advantageous operation to the government, which reasonably accepts it: the consolidation of the debt. A great benefit for the debtor and new bonds for us. As financiers of the consolidation we charge its expenses. As holders of the new bonds we collect two years of interest in advance.

How?

With the bonds from the new issue itself. Honorable, legal, and advantageous for the government. Future interest payments will be guaranteed, for example by pledging customs revenues. Now then, in exchange for the invaluable service of debt consolidation, the government authorizes the formation of a company to complete the railway. The shares of that company are distributed in three parts. One part goes to the railway contractors, who are us, for our work. Another goes to the holders of the old debt, who are also us, as compensation for unpaid interest. And a third part goes to the government for having built most of the railway. To each his own. We are creditors of the debt and owners of sixty-six percent of the railway shares! The railway has been transferred to us, free of claims or encumbrances! That includes the pier, the properties, the rolling stock, the buildings, the telegraph lines, the land, the stations, the tanks, and the workers. Thousands of workers to keep the railway running. Exemption from import duties on everything required for the railway.

In ninety-nine years we shall return it. But not free of charge. By then it will have transported millions of tons of bananas, representing billions of dollars for the Company. That is what a pile of old papers from an old foreign debt is worth. And, in addition, a page in history for the government that consolidated the public debt and built the railway for the happiness of the Nation.

— Manuel Galich, El tren amarillo, drama del Caribe en tres actos (Buenos Aires, 8 August 1954)

=== Vagrancy Law ===
On 7 May 1934, the Reglamento de Jornaleros ("Day Laborers Regulation"), which had been instituted during the administration of Justo Rufino Barrios and had become one of the principal economic mechanisms benefiting liberal landowners, was repealed. Three days later, Decree 1996 established the Vagrancy Law and the Road Service Law in its place. Under the legislation, indigenous day laborers who could not demonstrate having completed between one hundred and one hundred and fifty days of labor on landed estates were classified as "vagrants" and assigned to road-construction work without pay. As a result, landowners no longer needed to retain workers on their estates by force, since many laborers volunteered for agricultural work in order to avoid compulsory labor on public roads.

=== Payment of the British debt ===
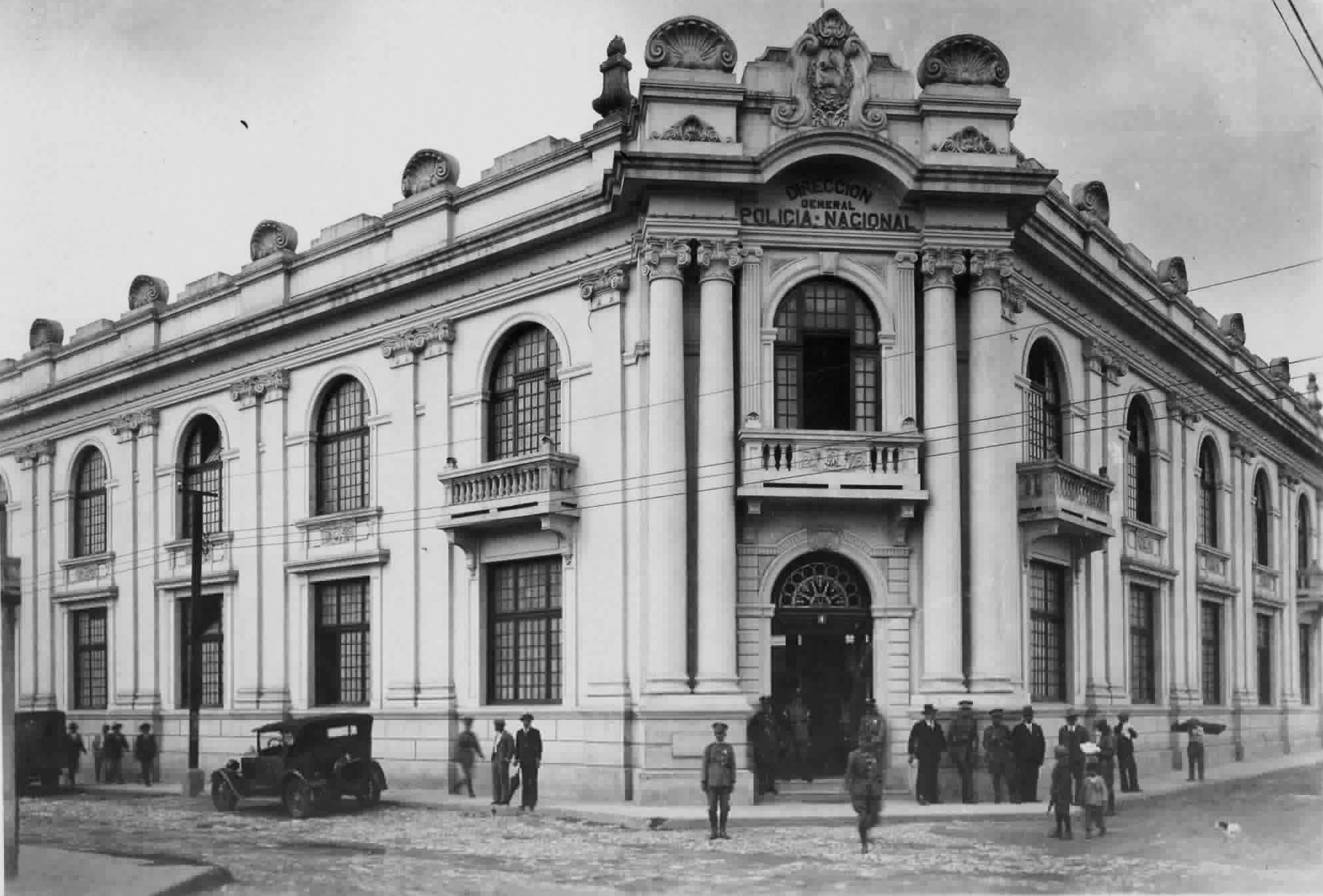
The General Directorate of the National Police during the Ubico regime. The director of the police was Colonel Roderico Anzueto, a personal friend of the president.

Toward the end of his administration, after deciding to resign, Ubico paid the debt incurred with the United Kingdom following the failure of the Central American Exposition of 1897 during the government of José María Reyna Barrios. The debt had been a major factor behind the efforts of the government of Manuel Estrada Cabrera to secure military and political support from the United States, partly as protection against a potential British intervention to collect it. Ubico delayed payment until the final stage of his presidency because he did not trust that his successor, whoever it might be, would settle the obligation.

Ubico granted coffee plantation owners and the United Fruit Company exemption from criminal liability under Decree 2795, which stated: "Owners of estates shall be exempt from criminal responsibility ...". (Note: This decree was repealed following the Guatemalan Revolution, but was restored in 1967 during the administration of Julio César Méndez Montenegro.)

=== Relations with Germany ===
As part of a goodwill worldwide tour promoting the Berlin 1936 Summer Olympics, in January of that year the German light cruiser Emden arrived in Guatemala. Its crew travelled by train to Guatemala City, where they paraded in front of Ubico's Army staff and the general public.

=== Middle class ===
While the middle class grew substantially during Ubico's regime, the basic character of the regime remained oligarchical and his regime primarily benefited the landowning class. The country's middle class, resentful of its exclusion from the government, later spearheaded the democratic revolution that removed Ubico from power.

=== Napoleon ===
Ubico considered himself to be "another Napoleon". He admired Napoleon Bonaparte extravagantly and preferred to have his photograph taken in his general's uniform. Ubico believed that he resembled Bonaparte, and his nickname was "the Little Napoleon of the Tropics". He dressed ostentatiously and surrounded himself with statues and paintings of Napoleon, regularly commenting on the similarities between their appearances.

=== Anti-corruption ===
Jorge Ubico in 1933.

Despite his dictatorship, Ubico was commended by both his defenders and his detractors for his personal integrity and for virtually eliminating corruption in Guatemala; anyone found guilty of corruption was "instantly" and "severely" punished. The so-called Probity Law mandated that all public officials publicly declare their assets before taking office and upon leaving it – and the law was rigorously enforced.

=== Education ===
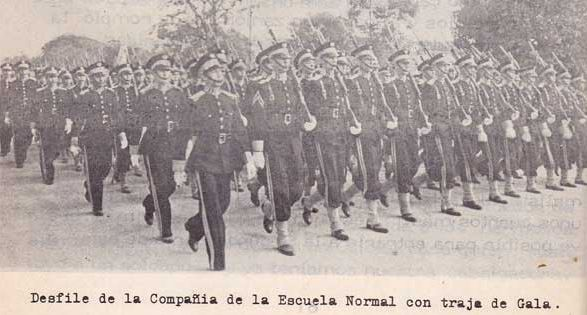
Students of the Escuela Normal para Varones marching on 30 June 1939. By that time, the school had been militarized.

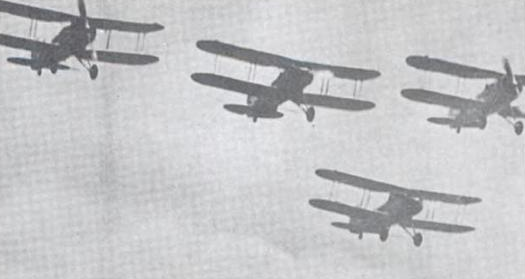
The Guatemalan Air Force during the administration of General Ubico.

When Jorge Ubico assumed the presidency in 1931, he reversed many recent educational reforms and significantly worsened conditions for the national teaching profession. The educational project remained largely dormant until it was revived by the administration of Juan José Arévalo, who had benefited from one of the government scholarships that enabled him to earn a doctorate in Argentina.

Arévalo implemented many of the reforms that Chacón had only been able to propose. The educator Luis Martínez Mont, a personal friend of Arévalo who had returned to Guatemala after completing advanced studies in child psychology in Switzerland under the renowned specialist Jean Piaget, was placed in charge of the country's teacher-training schools. Ubico kept the National University under the jurisdiction of the Ministry of Public Instruction, eliminating its authority to choose its own leadership and repealing the Education Law promoted by President Lázaro Chacón.

On 27 April 1932, the executive issued Decree 1264, which introduced tuition fees for secondary education. The decree cited economic reasons and argued that "the State is obliged to finance only primary education, since it constitutes the indispensable foundation and a matter of the utmost necessity for the preparation of the people and the expansion of national culture".

His administration implemented the following measures:

- Prohibited married women from working as teachers.
- Encouraged denunciation and surveillance among teachers, practices that had previously been employed during the administration of Estrada Cabrera.
- Promoted numerous public ceremonies praising the president and the Liberal Progressive Party. Teachers marched in parades wearing military-style uniforms and were subjected to strict discipline.
- Reduced some retired teachers' pensions to as little as two quetzales per month, an amount insufficient for subsistence; at the time, teachers earned at least fifteen quetzales per month.
- Organized heavily supervised school exhibitions.
- Introduced militarized education in secondary schools and semi-militarized education in primary schools. Secondary schools had been subject to a semi-military regime since 1932, with military officers—usually lieutenants or captains—appointed as inspectors. The chief inspector of each institution held a rank ranging from major to colonel. Disciplinary measures included detention, standing punishments, and temporary or permanent expulsion.
- At the beginning of his administration, because of the effects of the Great Depression of 1929, postponed the construction of new public primary schools and instead ordered the repair of existing ones. This policy changed around 1943, when school construction began to be encouraged.
- Invested large sums in thousands of school uniforms and colored flags.
- Promoted interscholastic athletic competitions. Physical education received significant emphasis and was commonly featured during celebrations of Independence Day (15 September) and the anniversary of the Liberal Revolution (30 June).

=== Culture and art ===
Ubico's administration was a difficult period for the Guatemalan artistic community, as the country remained largely isolated from major artistic and cultural developments. Entertainment was largely limited to cinema and occasional visits by foreign artistic groups. Ubico disapproved of artistic and intellectual expression, and any public performances required prior government censorship. As a result, Guatemala became culturally isolated from international trends, with the exception of cinema, circus performances, illusionism, and occasional foreign theatre companies.

==== Literary controversy surrounding Semilla de mostaza ====
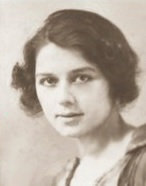
Elisa Hall de Asturias, author of Semilla de mostaza.

The first edition of Semilla de mostaza was printed in October 1938 in a run of 1,150 copies consisting of 416 pages. It was published with the support of the government of General Ubico and printed by the National Printing Office. The edition was carefully reviewed by its author, Elisa Hall de Asturias, who also decorated it with drawings and ornamental designs on the cover and throughout the interior.

The book caused widespread astonishment among readers. Many considered it a masterpiece comparable to the works of Lope de Vega, Luis de Góngora, and Miguel de Cervantes, arguing that it would enrich not only Guatemalan literature but also the literature of the wider Spanish-speaking world. Journalist Federico Hernández de León wrote in the Diario de Centro América: "…the unanimous opinion was expressed in warm praise: there was spontaneity, agility and grace, the flavor of aged wine and the color of old gold…".

Some critics, however, doubted that Semilla de mostaza—because of its literary sophistication—could have been written by a woman who was making her debut with such a monumental work and who had not attended university but had instead studied privately at home. These critics regarded it as impossible that a woman could possess such mastery of literary style. This skepticism sparked a controversy regarding the authorship of the work.

In reality, Guatemalan intellectuals took advantage of the opportunity to engage in a controversy removed from politics, which remained subject to strict censorship, and sought to display their erudition. Newspapers involved in the debate included El Imparcial, Nuestro Diario, and El Liberal Progresista, which, although not state-owned, generally expressed views sympathetic to the Ubico administration.

=== Repression and controversy ===
==== Police chief embezzlement accusation ====
On 18 September 1934, Efraín Aguilar Fuentes, Juventino Sánchez, Humberto Molina Santiago, Rafael Estrada Guilles, and Colonel Luis Ortiz Guzmán were tortured and executed inside the Guatemala National Penitenciary, (Note: Molina Santiago had tried to form a political party in Quetzaltenango to support General Roderico Anzueto to compete against Ubico in the upcoming presidential elections.) accused of planning a plot to overthrow president Ubico.

In his book The paradox garden (Spanish: El Jardín de las Paradojas), written in 1935, Guatemalan writer Efraín De los Ríos accused the police chief, General Roderico Anzueto Valencia, of making up the plot to get rid of the accused conspirators. According to De los Ríos, this is what really happened:

In early September 1934, when Ubico announced a popular referendum to determine whether he should extend his presidential term for another six years, the lawyer Efraín Aguilar Fuentes, the Property Registry director, sternly declined to be in favor of the president. When Ubico summoned him to the presidential office to chastise him, Fuentes coldly replied he was aware Police Chief Anzueto Valencia had embezzled up to twenty eight properties and therefore he, Aguilar, was not going to support the president. But he did not know that Anzueto was only the front man and the real owner was Ubico himself.

In the following weeks, Anzueto Valencia made up a list of people involved in a false plot to murder Ubico Castañeda, and among the people in the list he included Aguilar Fuentes. All the people on the list were imprisoned, tortured and forced to confess. Their "confessions" appeared in the semi-official newspaper El Liberal Progresista.

De los Ríos was incarcerated once the government learned about these strong accusations. He remained in the National Penitenciary for most of the rest of Ubico's presidency.

==== Congress gift ====
In 1940, the Guatemalan Congress gave Ubico a gift of US$200,000. Nearly 90 people were jailed for criticizing the gift.

=== Resignation and continuation ===
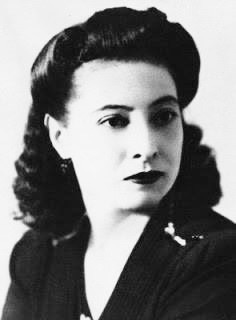
School teacher María Chinchilla Recinos in 1940.

Ubico's repressive policies and arrogant demeanor led to a widespread popular insurrection led by middle-class intellectuals, professionals, and junior army officers. School teacher María Chinchilla Recinos' death during a peaceful demonstration on 25 June 1944 sparked an outcry that led to Ubico's resignation on 1 July 1944, amidst a general strike and nationwide protests. Initially, he had planned to hand over power to the former director of police, General Roderico Anzueto, whom he felt could control. But his advisors recognized that Anzueto's pro-Nazi sympathies had made him very unpopular, and that he would not be able to control the military. Instead, Ubico chose to select a triumvirate composed of Major General Buenaventura Piñeda, Major General Eduardo Villagrán Ariza, and General Federico Ponce Vaides.

The three generals promised to convene the national assembly to hold an election for a provisional president, but when congress met on 3 July, soldiers held everyone at gunpoint and forced them to vote for General Ponce, rather than the popular civilian candidate Ramón Calderón. Ponce, who had previously retired from military service due to alcoholism, took orders from Ubico and kept many of the officials who had worked in the Ubico administration. The repressive policies of the Ubico administration continued.

=== Revolution and overthrow ===
Opposition groups began organizing again, this time joined by many prominent political and military leaders who deemed the Ponce regime unconstitutional. Among the military officers in the opposition were Jacobo Árbenz Guzmán and Major Francisco Javier Arana. Ubico had fired Árbenz from his teaching post at the Escuela Politécnica (Politechnic School), and since then Árbenz had been in El Salvador organizing a band of revolutionary exiles. On 19 October 1944, a small group of soldiers and students led by Árbenz and Arana attacked the National Palace, in what later became known as the "October Revolution". Ponce was defeated and driven into exile. Árbenz, Arana, and a lawyer named Jorge Toriello established a junta which held democratic elections before the end of the year, and were won by a professor named Juan José Arévalo.

== Exile and death ==
Ubico went into exile to New Orleans in the United States where he rented a small house and lived off the $200,000 he transferred to a personal bank account. On 17 May 1946, Ubico was admitted to Baptist Hospital and on 14 June he died of lung cancer at the age of 67. He was buried in the Mount Hope Cemetery in New Orleans.

Efforts to repatriate his remains were denied by the government of Miguel Ydíogoras Fuentes. However, on 13 August 1963, his remains were repatriated to Guatemala after appropriate measures were taken by the government of Enrique Peralta Azurdia and the United States government.

== Gallery ==
Palaces built during Ubico's presidency

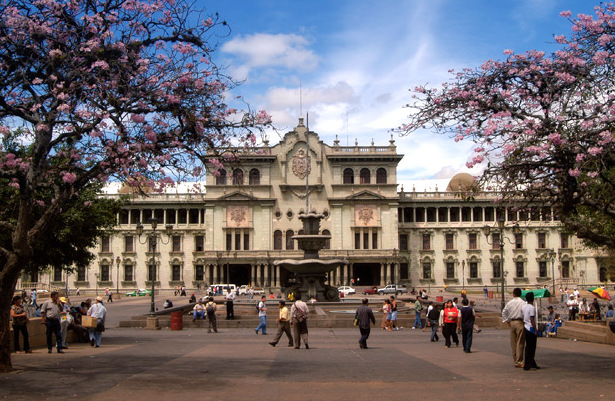
The National Palace

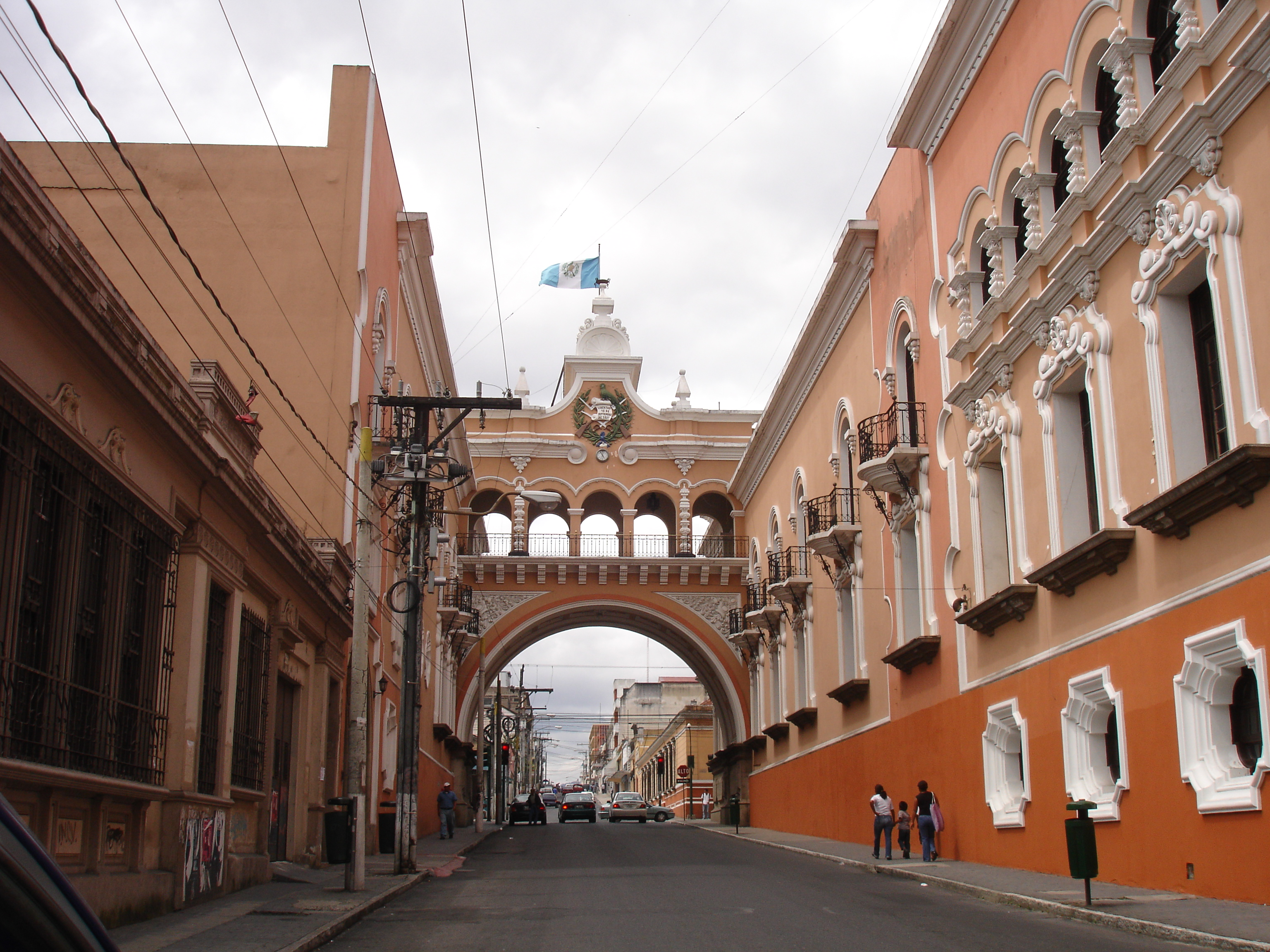
The Post Office

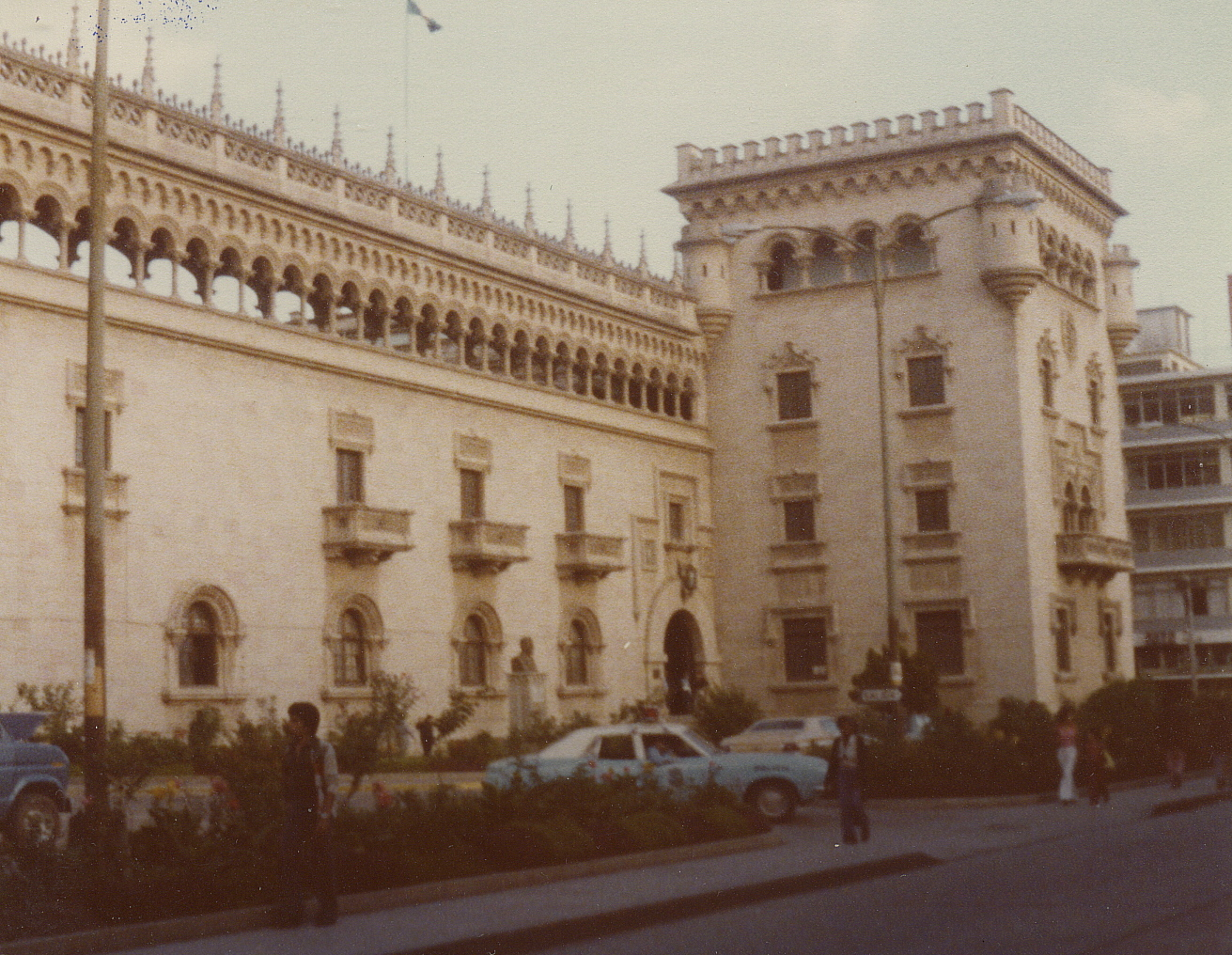
The Interior Ministry, originally the National Police

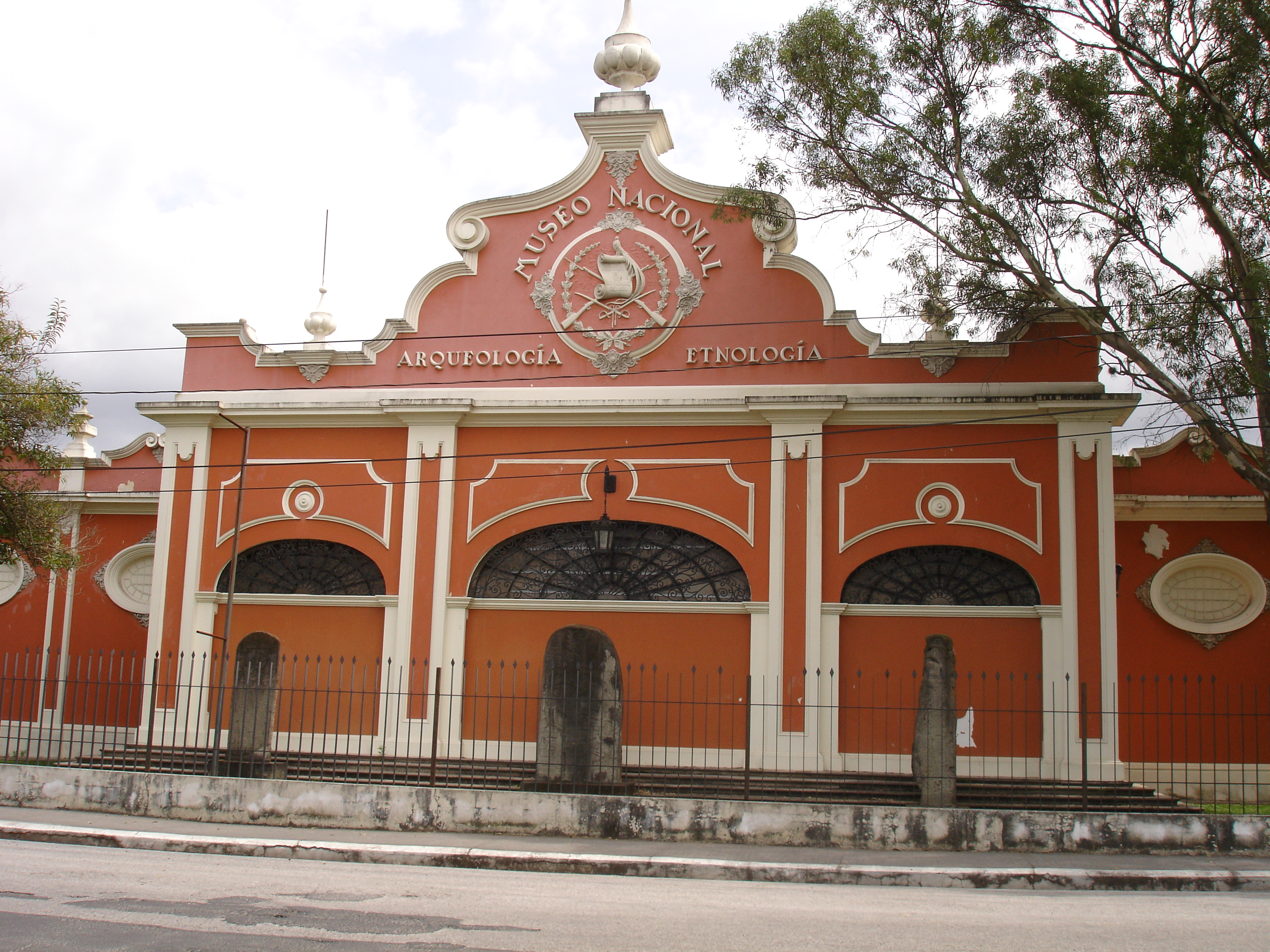
Museum, originally the November Fair Hall

== See also ==
- History of Guatemala
- Obelisco (Guatemala City)
- Guatemalan Revolution
- President of Guatemala
- German cruiser Emden

== Notes and references ==
=== Bibliography ===
- Benz, Stephen Connely (1996). Guatemalan Journey. University of Texas Press. ISBN 978-0-292-70840-2.
- Bucheli, Marcelo (2005). "Banana War Maneuvers". Harvard Business Review. 83 (11): 22–24. Archived from the original on 29 July 2012.
- Bucheli, Marcelo (Summer 2004a). "Enforcing Business Contracts in South America: the United Fruit Company and the Colombian Banana Planters in the Twentieth-Century". Business History Review. 78 (2). The President and Fellows of Harvard College: 181–212. doi:10.2307/25096865. JSTOR 25096865. S2CID 154456058.
- Bucheli, Marcelo (2006a). "The United Fruit Company in Latin America: Business Strategies in a Changing Environment". In Jones, Geoffrey; Wadhwani, R. Daniel (eds.). Entrepreneurship and Global Capitalism. Vol. 2. Cheltenham, England: Edward Elgar. pp. 342–383. Archived from the original on 13 October 2007.
- Bucheli, Marcelo (1997). "United Fruit Company in Colombia: Impact of Labor Relations and Governmental Regulations on its Operations, 1948–1968". Essays in Economic and Business History. 15: 65–84.
- Bucheli, Marcelo (2006b). "United Fruit Company". In Geisst, Charles (ed.). Encyclopedia of American Business History. London, England: Facts on File. ISBN 978-0-8160-4350-7.
- Bucheli, Marcelo (2004b). "United Fruit Company". In McCusker, John (ed.). History of World Trade Since 1450. New York: Macmillan.
- Díaz Romeu, Guillermo (1996). "Del régimen de Carlos Herrera a la elección de Jorge Ubico". Historia general de Guatemala. 1993–1999 (in Spanish). Vol. 5. Guatemala: Asociación de Amigos del País, Fundación para la Cultura y el Desarrollo. pp. 37–42. Archived from the original on 12 January 2015.
- Gleijeses, Piero (1992). Shattered hope: the Guatemalan revolution and the United States, 1944-1954. Princeton University Press. ISBN 978-0-691-02556-8.
- Grandin, Greg (2000). The blood of Guatemala: a history of race and nation. Duke University Press. ISBN 978-0-8223-2495-9.
- Forster, Cindy (2001). The Time of Freedom: Campesino Workers in Guatemala's October Revolution. University of Pittsburgh Press. ISBN 9780822941620.
- Fried, Jonathan L. (1983). Guatemala in rebellion: unfinished history. Grove Press. p. 52.
- Friedman, Max Paul (2003). Nazis and good neighbors: the United States campaign against the Germans of Latin America in World War II. Cambridge University Press. pp. 82–83. ISBN 9780521822466.
- Immerman, Richard H. (1983). The CIA in Guatemala: The Foreign Policy of Intervention. University of Texas Press. ISBN 9780292710832.
- Jonas, Susanne (1991). The battle for Guatemala: rebels, death squads, and U.S. power (5th ed.). Westview Press. ISBN 978-0-8133-0614-8.
- Krehm, William (1999). Democracies and Tyrannies of the Caribbean in 1940s. Comer Publications. ISBN 9781896266817.
- Loveman, Brian; Davies, Thomas M. (1997). The Politics of antipolitics: the military in Latin America (3rd, rev. ed.). Rowman & Littlefield. ISBN 978-0-8420-2611-6.
- Martínez Peláez, Severo (1990). La Patria del Criollo (in Spanish). México: Ediciones En Marcha. p. 858.
- McCreery, David (1994). Rural Guatemala, 1760–1940. Stanford University Press. ISBN 9780804723183.
- Nuestro Diario (14 December 1930). "Noticias de primera plana". Nuestro Diario (in Spanish). Guatemala.
- Nuestro Diario (8 February 1931). "Noticias de primera plana". Nuestro Diario (in Spanish). Guatemala.
- Paterson, Thomas G.; et al. (2009). American Foreign Relations: A History. Vol. 2: Since 1895. Cengage Learning. ISBN 978-0547225692.
- Rabe, Stephen G. (1988). Eisenhower and Latin America: The Foreign Policy of Anticommunism. Chapel Hill: University of North Carolina Press. ISBN 9780807842041.
- Shillington, John (2002). Grappling with atrocity: Guatemalan theater in the 1990s. Fairleigh Dickinson University Press. pp. 38–39. ISBN 9780838639306.
- Streeter, Stephen M. (2000). Managing the counterrevolution: the United States and Guatemala, 1954–1961. Ohio University Press. ISBN 978-0-89680-215-5.
- Time (29 December 1930). "Wrong horse No. 2". Time magazine. United States. Archived from the original on 12 January 2015.
- Time (12 January 1931a). "We are not amused". Time magazine. United States. Archived from the original on 15 December 2008.
- Time (20 April 1931b). "Died. General Lazaro Chacon, 56, President of Guatemala". United States. Archived from the original on 15 December 2008.

Political offices
Preceded by José María Reina Andrade (acting)	President of Guatemala; 1931–1944	Succeeded by Juan Federico Ponce Vaides
