= José María Reina Andrade =

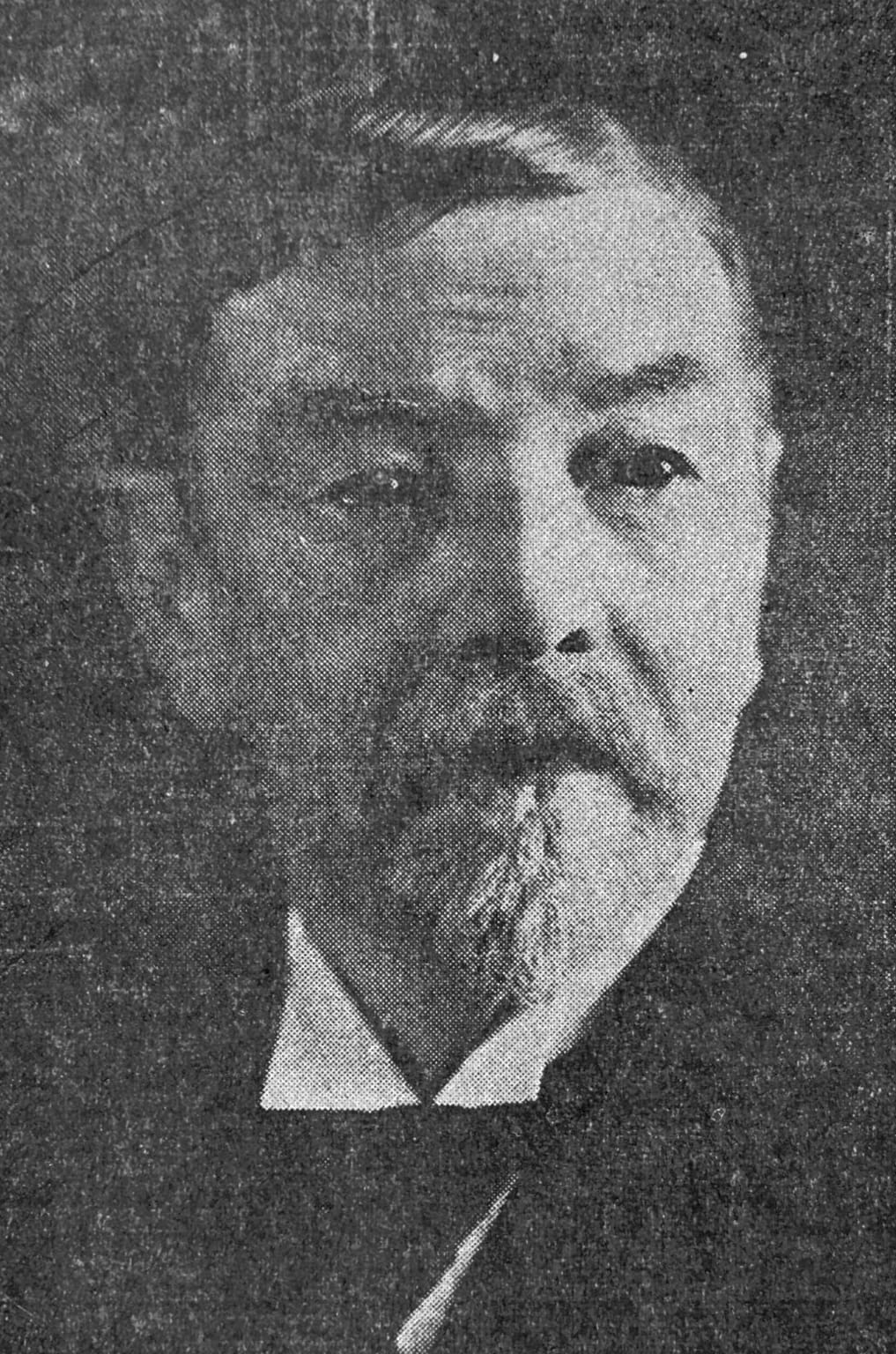
- Reina in the 1930s

20th President of Guatemala
- Acting
- In office 2 January 1931 – 14 February 1931
- Preceded by: Manuel María Orellana Contreras (de facto)
- Succeeded by: Jorge Ubico

First Vice President of Guatemala
- In office 26 June 1902 – 30 April 1903
- President: Manuel Estrada Cabrera
- Preceded by: Manuel Morales Tovar
- Succeeded by: Mariano Serrano Muñoz

Personal details
- Born: 1 November 1860 Guatemala
- Died: 25 April 1947 (aged 86) Santiago de Cuba, Cuba
- Party: Liberal
- Spouse: Soledad Trabanino de Andrade
- Education: Guatemala National University
- Occupation: politician
- Profession: lawyer

José María Reina Andrade (1 November 1860 – 25 April 1947) was the acting President of Guatemala from 2 January 1931 to 14 February 1931.

Reina Andrade was appointed by the Congress of Guatemala on 31 December 1930, as president of the Republic. On 2 January 1931, he called for Congress to take over the chairmanship of the republic. He remained in power just long enough while making the call for elections to the members of the Liberal Party to achieve taxation power for Jorge Ubico. It is said he received specific instructions from Jorge Ubico and the Liberal Party to convene elections quickly.

Andrade left power as a result of the elections that handed the presidency to Ubico on 14 February 1931.

== Manuel Estrada Cabrera government ==
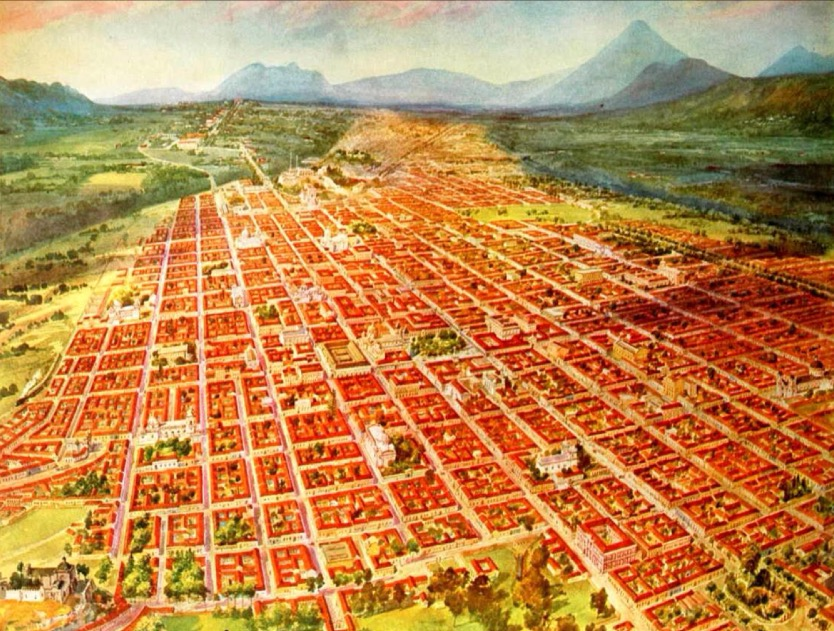
Painting of Guatemala City in 1915. From Libro Azul de Guatemala.

Reina Andrade served as Secretary of the Interior during the second presidential term of Manuel Estrada Cabrera—from 1905 to 1911—and he was in charge of the investigations of the murder attempts against the president that took place on April 29, 1907 -"The bomb"- and on April 20, 1908 -"Cadets assassination attempt"-.

=== "The bomb" ===
An Extra issue of El Guatemalteco on 29 April 1907 published the following:

«CRIMINAL ASSASSINATION ATTEMPT. At eight in the morning of today, when Mr. President of the Republic, Manuel Estrada Cabrera, left his home in his chariot and was on his way to the south of the city on the laudable mission to inspect the construction work that for the good of civilization and progress he ordered, a dynamite loaded mine activated by an electrical device, made a horrible explosion on the 7th. S. Avenue, between 16th and 17th W. streets. The detonation was horrendous and it was heard all over the city; but fortunately, for the good of the Motherland, its effects were far away from following the highly despicable desires of its criminal makers.

In early 1907, lawyer Enrique Ávila Echeverría and his brother, physician Jorge Ávila Echeverría, along with Dr. Julio Valdés Blanco and electrical engineer Baltasar Rodil, planned a bombing attack on the president of Guatemala, Manuel Estrada Cabrera, which took place on 29 April 1907, and is generally known in Guatemala as "The Bomb". The Echeverría brothers and their mates were from the elite class and had studied abroad, but when they came back to Guatemala, they did not like what they saw: a country where there was extreme abuse of power. When they decided to try to kill the president, they chose to use explosives. They prepared everything meticulously: the explosives, the detonators, the day and the exact time; even the president's driver -Patrocinio Monterroso- was on board.

On the day planned for the attack, 29 April, the president was traveling in his chariot along his 13-year-old son, Joaquin, and his chief of staff, general José María Orellana. (Note: Orellana would become president of Guatemala in 1921 after a successful coup d'état sponsored by the United Fruit Company.) Around 10 a.m., they were on the 7th. S. Avenue, in between the 16th and 17th W streets when the bomb went off. However, by a miscalculation, Estrada Cabrera and those that were with him were unharmed. Only his driver and one of the horses died.

On 2 May 1907, Emilio Ubico, brother of Arturo Ubico Urruela -president of Congress- and uncle of Jorge Ubico Castañeda -political chief of Verapaz-, was appointed as Chief of Police, in charge of the investigations, along the Secretary of the Interior, Reina Andrade. A few days later, Congress issued Decree 737, by which any explosive related import was prohibited, unless previously authorized by the Secretary of War.

Over the next twenty two days, the four conspirators fled through the small streets and little holes that they could find, trying to escape from Guatemala City, but they could not escape because the government surround the city and slowly started to close in while combing every inch of terrain. Even their families were prosecuted and incarcerated. They were others conspirators, brothers Juan and Adolfo Viteri and Francisco Valladares, were arrested when they were trying to flee disguised as women in Guastatoya. Others, like Felipe and Rafael Prado Romaña, tried to flee to El Salvador, but were captured when somebody told on them- the Romaña brothers were in prison until their death-. Only the Colombian Rafael Madriñán escaped on a bike and left the country. The mother of the Romaña brothers took the Mexican Ambassador, Federico Camboa, to the house where the Avila Echeverría brothers and his friends were hiding, who, knowing that they had only days to live, gave him all their valuables and beg him to pass them on to their relatives.

At last, after several days of uncertainty, Rufina Roca de Monzón gave them shelter in the second floor of her home, # 29 Judío Place in Guatemala City, but a spy learned about it. on May 20, 1907, at 3 a.m. the house was surrounded by a soldier platoon. The troop brought down the door and tried to reach the second floor, but at that moment crossed gunfire started; by 6 a.m. the conspirators were out of ammo and exhausted and decided to kill themselves before becoming prisoners of the regime. The Diario de Centro América, then a semi-official newspaper owned by Estrada Cabrera, went as far as to publish the conspirators autopsy details.

=== "The cadets" assassination attempt ===
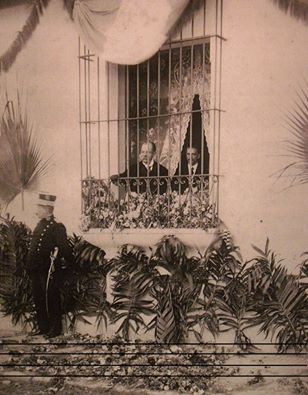
President Estrada Cabrera watching a processing from his balcony. This was a common occurrence before the assassination attempt of 1908.

By 1908, Santo Domingo Church members had modified the path of its centennial and traditional Good Friday procession, such that now was passed in front of the Estrada Cabrera house on 7th S. Avenue in Guatemala City. That year, several Military Academy cadets, after noticing that the procession uniforms completely covered the face of the penitents, decided to disguise themselves and blend in the procession and by the time it passed in front of the president's house, they would storm in and take him prisoner. However, the extremely efficient spy system that Estrada Cabrera had in place allowed him to thwart the kidnapping attempt. As soon as he learned about this, Estrada Cabrera prohibited the procession from passing in front of his house, placed a fence in front of it and prohibited the use of masks for the Holy Week processions.

On 20 April 1908, during the official reception of the new United States Ambassador in the National Palace, Military Academy cadet Víctor Manuel Vega, in revenge of what happened to his classmates and teachers, shot Estrada Cabrera point blank, but only managed to hurt him in his pinky. A flag from the official escort helped avoid the bullet from reaching the president. Enraged, and in order to set a precedent, Estrada Cabrera ordered to shoot all of Vega's Military Academy unit, except two, Rogelio Girón and Manuel Hurtarte, who were taken prisoners without any legal document. Vega had died on the spot where he tried to attack the president, killed instantly by his bodyguards. The president also ordered the Military Academy to be closed, its building (Note: Which was located in the former monastery of La Recolección Church in Guatemala City.) demolished and that salt would be spread on the field. Several military officers were sent to prison, including some loyal to the president.

== Bibliography ==
- Aquí Guatemala (2007). "Presidentes: José María Reina Andrade". Aquí Guatemala (in Spanish). Guatemala. Archived from the original on 7 August 2007.
- Aquí Guatemala (2008). "Biografía de Manuel María Orellana". Aquí Guatemala (in Spanish). Guatemala. Archived from the original on 6 February 2008.
- Arévalo Martínez, Rafael (1945). ¡Ecce Pericles! (in Spanish). Guatemala: Tipografía Nacional.
- Bascome Jones, J.; Scoullar, William T.; Soto Hall, Máximo (1915). El Libro azul de Guatemala. Searcy & Pfaff. "relato é historia sobre la vida de las personas más prominentes; historia condensada de la república; artículos especiales sobre el comercio, agricultura y riqueza mineral, basado sobre las estadísticas oficiales"
- Bucheli, Marcelo; Jones, Geoffrey (2005). "The Octopus and the Generals: the United Fruit Company in Guatemala". Harvard Business School Case (9–805–146).
- Diario de Centro América (21 April 1908). "Otro criminal atentado contra la persona del benemérito presidente de la República". Diario de Centro América (in Spanish). Guatemala.
- Diario de Centro América (2012). "Historia del Diario de Centro América" (PDF). Foro red boa (in Spanish). Archived from the original (PDF) on 20 July 2014.
- Diario de Centro América (4 June 1907). "Informe de la autopsia de los perpetradores del criminal atentado contra la persona del Presidente de la Reública". Diario de Centro América (in Spanish). Guatemala: Tipografía Unión.
- El Guatemalteco (2 May 1907a). "Decretos del organismo ejecutivo". El Guatemalteco; Diario Oficial de la República de Guatemala, en la América Central (in Spanish). Guatemala.
- El Guatemalteco (8 May 1907b). "Decretos del organismo legislativo". El Guatemalteco; Diario Oficial de la República de Guatemala, en la América Central (in Spanish). Guatemala.
- El Guatemalteco (22 March 1907c). "Decretos del organismo legislativo". El Guatemalteco, Diario Oficial de la República de Guatemala, en la América Central (in Spanish). Guatemala.
- El Guatemalteco (29 April 1907d). "Decretos del organismo ejecutivo". El Guatemalteco, Diario Oficial de la República de Guatemala, en la América Central (in Spanish). Guatemala.
- Gamboa, Federico (1934). "Mi diario" (in Spanish). México: Ediciones Botas.
- Nuestro Diario (13 December 1930). "Presidente Lázaro Chacón obligado a renunciar a la presidencia por enfermedad". Nuestro Diario (in Spanish). Guatemala.
- Nuestro Diario (17 December 1930). "Alzados deponen al presidente Palma". Nuestro Diario (in Spanish). Guatemala.
- Nuestro Diario (18 December 1930). "El general Manuel María Orellana presidente de la República". Nuestro Diario (in Spanish). Guatemala.
- Time (1930). "Wrong horse No. 2". Time magazine. United States.
- Time (1931). "We are not amused". Time magazine. United States. Archived from the original on 15 December 2008.
- Time (1931b). "Died. General Lazaro Chacon, 56, President of Guatemala". Time magazine. United States. Archived from the original on 15 December 2008.

Political offices
Preceded by Manuel María Orellana	President of Guatemala; 1931 (acting)	Succeeded by Jorge Ubico
