= Manuel Galich =

Guatemalan playwright (1913–1984)

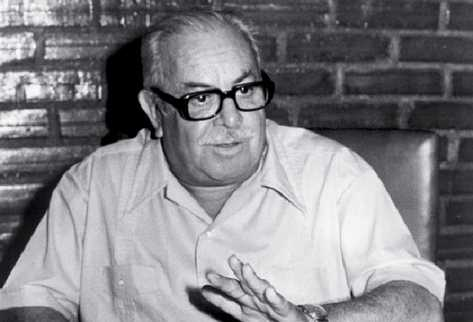
Manuel Galich

Manuel Francisco Galich López (Ciudad de Guatemala, 30 November 1913 – La Habana, 31 August 1984) was a Guatemalan playwright.

He was born in Guatemala to María Isabel López Santa Cruz and Luis Dionisio Galich Urquía and was one of four children. In 1928 he received a scholarship and was accepted into the Escuela Normal para Varones, where he began his secondary schooling. Due to a strike at the Escuela Normal, he was transferred to the Instituto Nacional Central para Varones. There he obtained a master's degree in Primary Education and a bachelor's degree in Science in Letter. Manuel's artistic gifts were confirmed this year as he wrote and directed his first play titled Los conspiradores, which began his development as a playwright. One year later he imparted chairs of Pedagogy, Literature, Grammar, and History in the Escuela Normal Central para Varones and in the Instituto Normal Central para Señoritas Belén.

In 1933 Manuel Galich entered into the Universidad Nacional from which he graduated as a lawyer. Two years after graduation he was appointed as Vocal II for the College of Lawyers before the Joint Directive of Faculty for the Legal and Social Sciences.

From a very early age Manuel Galich was involved in theatre. During his time as teaching, Manuel Galich wrote theatre pieces with his students as the assembly. He began as an actor when he was eleven years old and also did work as a member of the “radioteatro” (radio theatre) for the official radio TGW of Guatemala. After some time he became an author of very valuable works of theatre.

Manuel Galich was one of the most representative young people fighting against the dictatorships of both Jorge Ubico Castañeda and Federico Ponce Vaides. He also served as a revolutionary during the Revolution of October 20, 1944. In his book Del pánico al ataque tells of the fights his generation had to fight against the dictatorship.

From 1944 to 1954 he held various positions including President of the Congress, Minister of Education, Minister of Foreign Affairs, and ambassador to Uruguay and Argentina during the Jacobo Árbenz government.
