= Federico Hernández de León =

Guatemalan writer and historian (1883–1959)

- Born: March 4, 1883; Quetzaltenango, Guatemala
- Died: 1959 (aged 75–76); Ciudad de Guatemala, Guatemala
- Other name: "Chibolón Hernández"
- Occupations: writer; journalist; historian
- Spouse: Gloria Mollineda
- Children: Aúrea and Alida Hernández
- Writing career
- Language: Spanish
- Genre: History

Federico Hernández de León (March 4, 1883 – 1959) was a Guatemalan writer, historian and journalist. He graduated from the Instituto Nacional Central para Varones of Guatemala, with a high school diploma in 1900. Active politically, was arrested during the last few years of the government of president Manuel Estrada Cabrera, being held in the Central Penitentiary of Guatemala until the president was deposed on April 14, 1920. After his release, he went straight to take over the Diario de Centro América semi-official newspaper of Guatemala at the time. Later, he directed Nuestro Diario along with Carlos Bauer Aviles.

== Biography ==
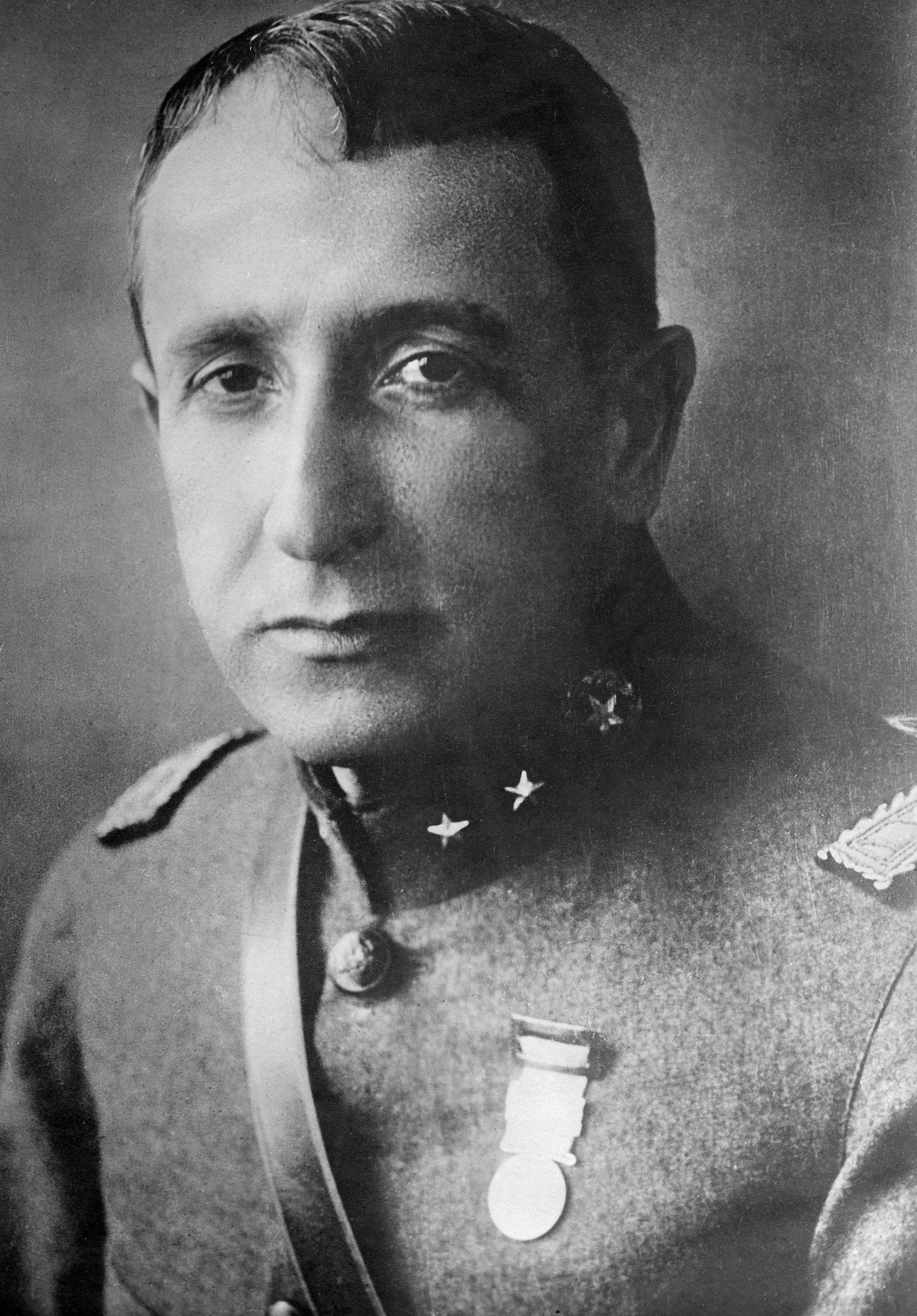
General Jorge Ubico, President of Guatemala from 1931 to 1944

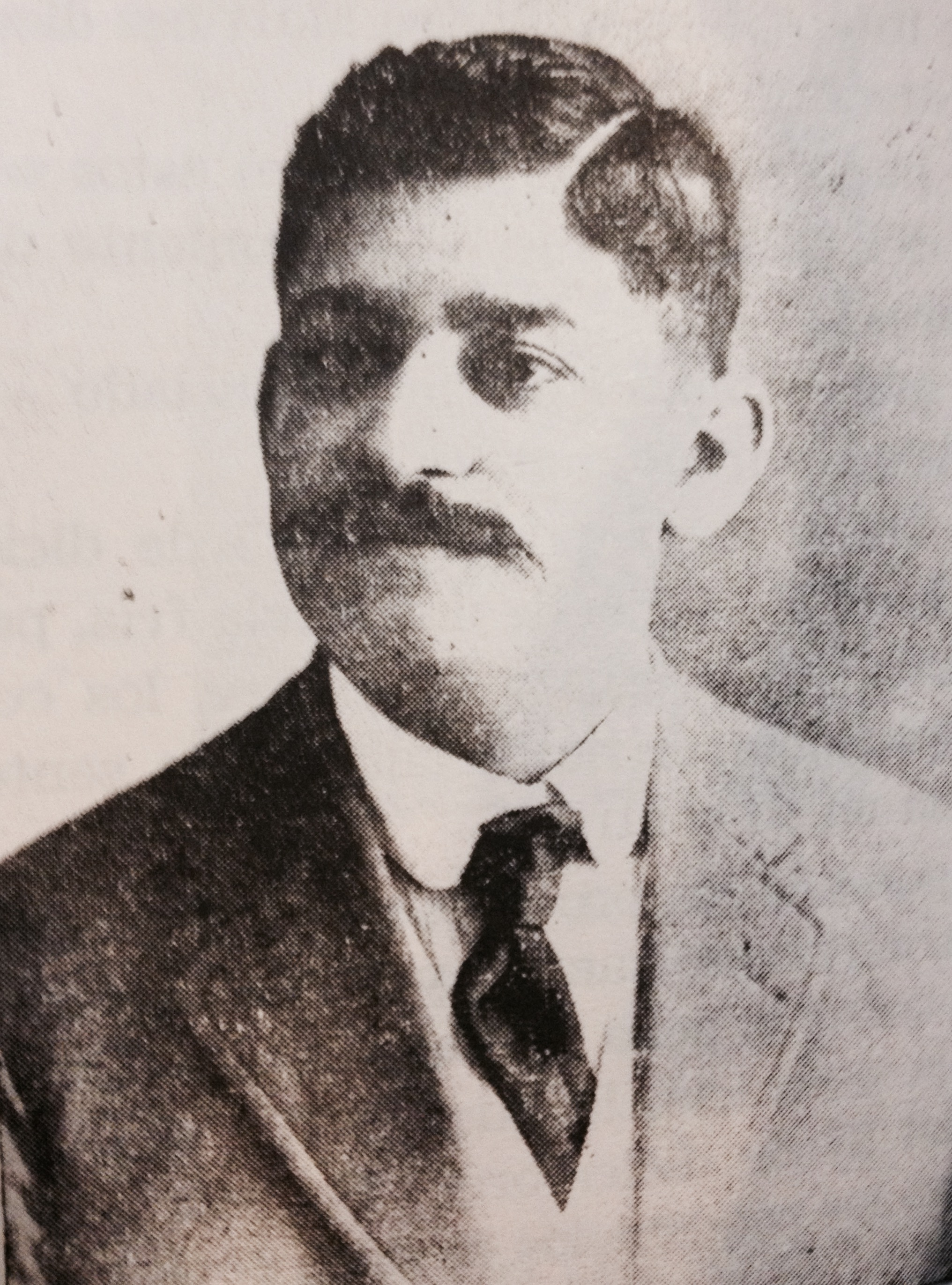
Silverio Ortiz, Guatemalan labor leader and Hernández's close friend.

During his more than six years of imprisonment in the Central Penitentiary, Hernández de León suffered many indignities that left him on the brink of death; but his friend, the labor leader Silverio Ortiz advocated for him to the minister plenipotentiary of the United States, showing Hernández de León's bloody clothes.

After the fall of Estrada Cabrera in 1920, he was released and returned to journalism; he was in the legislature and in the National Congress in the 1920s and 1930s. On December 12, 1930, there was a lot of turmoil in the Guatemalan government after general Lázaro Chacón suffered a stroke that forced him to resign from office. Hernández de León was a first hand witness as he was in Congress and he was also de Director of newspaper Nuestro Diario. In December 1930 the following events occurred in a rapid succession:

- On December 12, General Chacón suffers a stroke that forces him to resign.
- General Mauro de León, first designated successor to the Presidency apparently resigns.
- Lawyer and cabinet member Baudilio Palma, second designated successor, is appointed interim President.
- On December 16, 1930, a coup de' etat led by general Manuel María Orellana Contreras (Note: First cousin of late former president José María Orellana.) forces Palma to resign after a short battle inside the Presidential Palace. During the fight, that lasted no more than an hour, both Palma and Mauro de León died. The Liberal Progresista party places general Roderico Anzueto in the key position of Chief of Police. (Note: Anzueto would eventually become one of President Jorge Ubico main supporters during his 14-year presidency.)
- On January 2, 1931 José María Reina Andrade is appointed interim President, after the foreign nations representatives refuse to deal with Orellana Contreras and calls for presidential elections.
- On February 7, 1931, general Jorge Ubico Castañeda wins the elections and is sworn as president. The Liberal Party joined with the Progressives to nominate Ubico as Andrade's successor, and although he was the only candidate on the ballot, he received 305,841 votes in February 1931. In his inaugural address, he pledged a "march toward civilization". Once in office, he began a campaign of efficiency that included assuming dictatorial power.

== Affiliations ==
- Member of the Guatemalan Academy, corresponding to the Royal Spanish Academy of Language
- Member of the Liberal Progressive Party of Guatemala.

== Legacy ==
When he was the Director of Nuestro Diario he hired a very young Clemente Marroquín Rojas (Note: Who later became a famous Guatemalan journalist and also became Vicepresident of Guatemala in 1966.) as a columnist. Eventually Marroquín Rojas even took charge of the newspaper and wrote Hernández's column "Efemérides" while Hernández was out on commission.

== Bibliography ==
- Barnoya, José (2007). "Historia de Septiémbre". Albedrío (in Spanish). Guatemala.
- Barnoya, José (2011). "Carlos Bauer, una trayectoria valiente y límpida". elPeriódico (in Spanish). Guatemala. Archived from the original on October 26, 2014.
- De los Ríos, Efraín (1948). Ombres contra Hombres (in Spanish). México: Fondo de la Cultura de la Universidad de México.
- Díaz Romeu, Guillermo (1996). "Del régimen de Carlos Herrera a la elección de Jorge Ubico". Historia general de Guatemala. 1993–1999 (in Spanish). 5. Guatemala: Asociación de Amigos del País, Fundación para la Cultura y el Desarrollo: 37–42. Archived from the original on August 9, 2014.
- El Guatemalteco (2012). "Presentan "Semilla de Mostaza" y "Mostaza" de Elisa Hall de Asturias". El Guatemalteco en línea (in Spanish). Guatemala.
- Hernández de León, Federico (1938). "Semilla de Mostaza". Diario de Centro América (in Spanish). Guatemala.
- Pérez Galdós, Benito (1939). "Epístola a Elisa Hall". El Imparcial (in Spanish). Guatemala.
- Quirante Amores, Gabriela (2012). Semilla de mostaza (1938): Polémica sobre la autoría y análisis interpretativo de la obra (in Spanish). TFM Estudio literarios.
- Red Boa (2012). "Historia del Diario de Centro América" (PDF). Foro Red Boa (in Spanish). Archived from the original (PDF) on July 20, 2014.
- "Wrong horse No. 2". Time magazine. US. 1930.
- "We are not amused". Time magazine. US. 1931. Archived from the original on December 15, 2008.
- Who's Who in Latin America: A Biographical dictionary of the outstanding living men and women of Spanish America and Brazil. San Francisco, CA: Stanford University Press. 1935. ISBN 080472315X.
