= José María Orellana =

Guatemalan political and military leader

General of Division José María Orellana
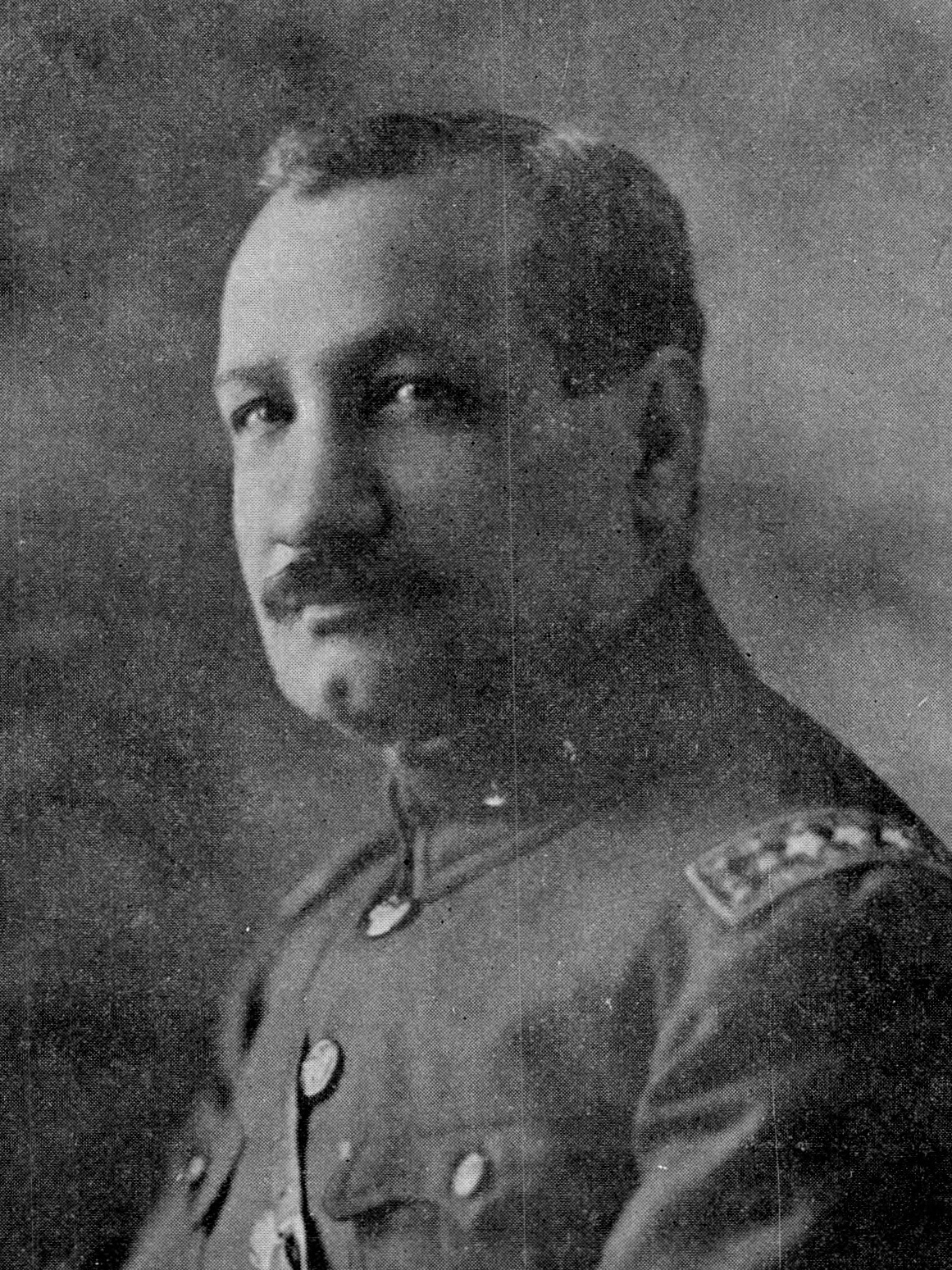
- Portrait c. 1925

President of Guatemala
- In office 10 December 1921 – 26 September 1926
- Preceded by: Carlos Herrera
- Succeeded by: Lázaro Chacón González

16th First Vice President of Guatemala
- In office 8 December 1921 – 28 April 1922
- President: Carlos Herrera y Luna
- Preceded by: José Ernesto Zelaya
- Succeeded by: Jorge Ubico

Personal details
- Born: José María Orellana Pinto; 11 July 1872 El Jícaro, El Progreso, Guatemala
- Died: 26 September 1926 (aged 54) Antigua Guatemala, Guatemala
- Party: Liberal
- Nickname(s): Don Chema; Rapadurero

Military service
- Allegiance: Guatemala
- Rank: General

José María Orellana Pinto (11 July 1872 – 26 September 1926) was a Guatemalan political and military leader. He was chief of staff of President Manuel Estrada Cabrera and President of Guatemala between 1921 and 1926, after overthrowing Conservative Unionist President Carlos Herrera. During his rule the Quetzal was established as the currency of Guatemala. Orellana Pinto died under suspicious circumstances in 1926 at the age of fifty-four. He was buried in the Guatemalan capital with state honors.

== Early life ==
José María Orellana Pinto was born in El Jícaro; he was the son of Esteban Orellana and Leonora Pinto. Orellana had a military career becoming General of the Guatemalan Army. He was elected to the Guatemalan legislature on several occasions, as a member of the Liberal Party, and was also Chief of Staff of the President Estrada Cabrera; when serving as such, on 29 April 1907, he was riding alongside the president's coach when the latter suffered a bomb attack -which had been planned by the brothers Avila Echeverría and some of their relatives and friends. Both Estrada and Orellana were unharmed by the assassination attempt and almost immediately initiated the prosecution of the perpetrators.

== Coup d'état against Carlos Herrera ==
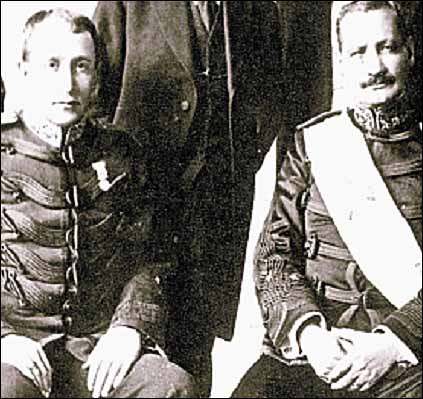
General José María Orellana (right) and General Jorge Ubico (left) after the coup d'état that deposed President Herrera in 1921.

On 5 December 1921, General Orellana - sponsored by the United Fruit Company - lead a coup d'état against president Carlos Herrera who had resisted approval of the concessions granted to the United Fruit Company and its subsidiaries by his predecessor, Manuel Estrada Cabrera. Orellana had the help of several army officers, among them general Jorge Ubico.

== Presidency ==
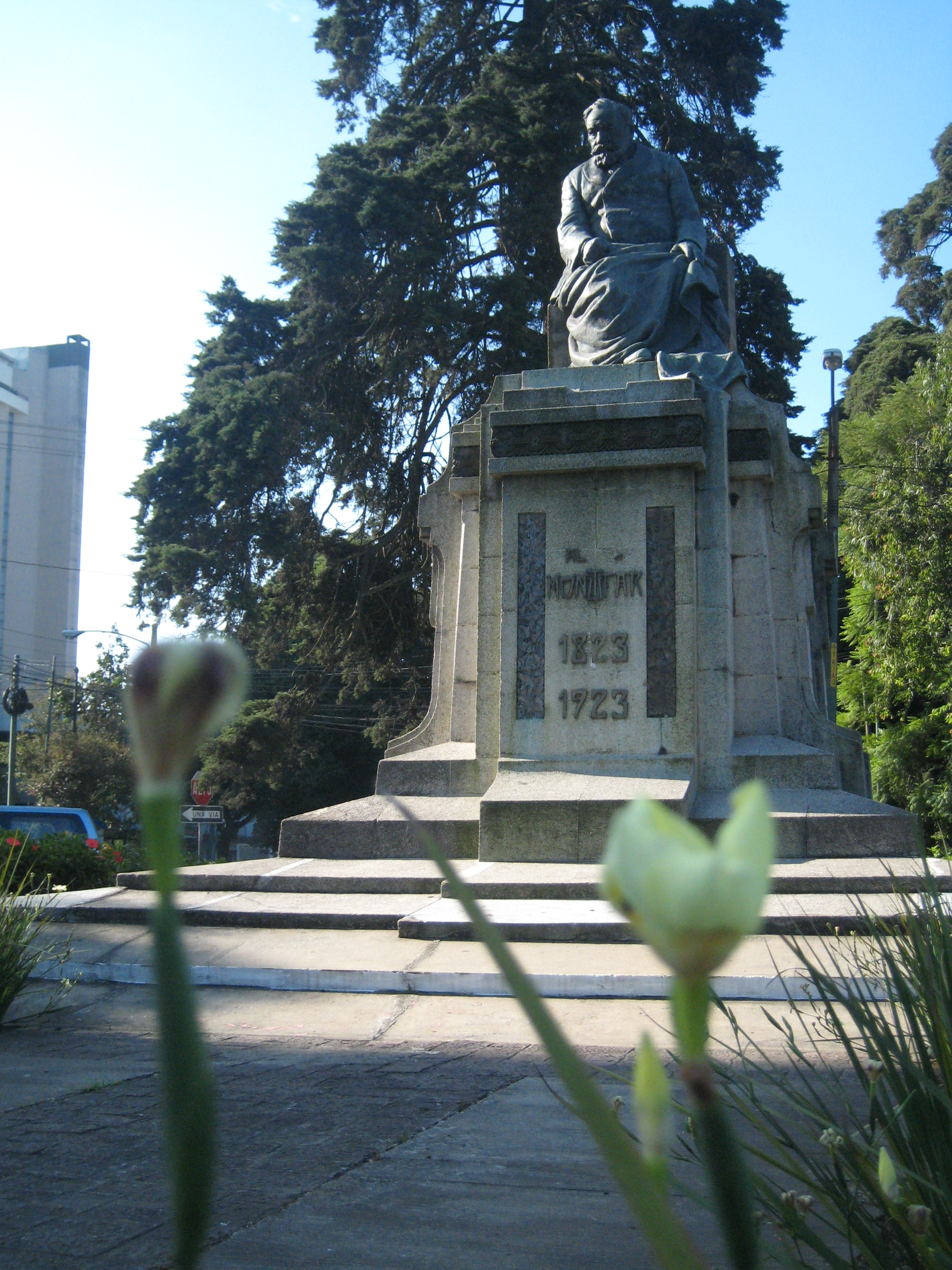
Dr. Lorenzo Montúfar y Rivera monument in Avenida Reforma.

On 5 December 1921, Orellana was appointed as Interim President, and eventually became Constitutional President after winning the elections the following year. During his term in office, he ratified concessions that the government of Estrada Cabrera had made to the United Fruit Company (UFCO) and that Herrera had refused to ratify. He also encouraged the creation of a tripartite republic formed by Guatemala, Honduras and El Salvador, but this was unsuccessful. In 1923, in celebration of the birth centennial of liberal writer and ideologist Dr. Lorenzo Montúfar y Rivera, the government erected a monument to his memory in Avenida Reforma.

=== Economy ===
Gum raw material extraction in the northern department of Petén was sold to Percy W. Shufeldt, who carried out the operation without paying taxes; unlike his predecessor—Carlos Herrera—Orellana gave favorable contracts such as the Shufeldt one to foreign companies. Another examples was the Electric Company, which had been expropriated from German shareholders after World War I, and was sold to the American Bond and Share Company on 4 May 1922.

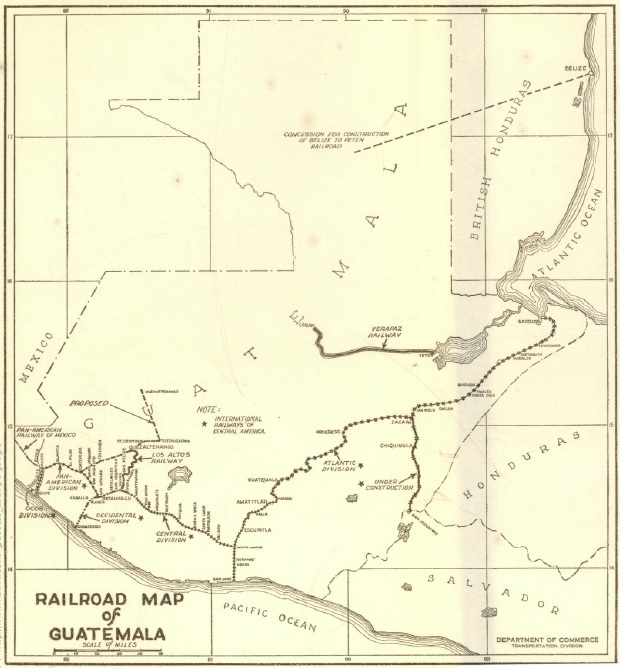
Map of railways in Guatemala in 1925. Orellana ratified the concessions that Manuel Estrada Cabrera had made to International Railways of Central America—an UFCO company.

Orellana promoted the construction of hundreds of kilometers of railways and was pressured by the International Railways of Central America (Note: IRCA was a United Fruit Company subsidiary.) to enforce the Méndez-Williamson railroad contract, signed in 1908 by then president Manuel Estrada Cabrera. When Estrada Cabrera was ousted, IRCA had intended to enact this agreement but the acting president Carlos Herrera refused to implement the contract; (Note: The contract was not favorable for Guatemala and Herrera was concerned to make arrangements to enact it. The project was intended to build a railroad between Zacapa and Anguiatú—on the Guatemalan-Salvadorean border.) after Herrera was overthrown, Orellana ratified the contract on 10 March 1922.

The Guatemalan Congress issued the following laws during his term in office:

- Ratified the Central American Union Covenant held in San Jose, Costa Rica.
- Approved the contract for light, heat and electric power services, held in Guatemala City between government representatives and the Central America Power Company.
- Hydrocarbons law
- Ratified executive Decree 798, by which Archbishop Luis Javier Muñoz y Capurón remained in exile.
- Approved the contract between the government and Emilio Capoulliez, proxy for Washington Serruys, for the installation of an electric tram.
- Approved the contract between the Ministry of Development and the All America Cables Incorporated company to build a public telegram office in Guatemala City
- Approved the contract with AEG from Berlin, Germany, to continue and complete the Los Altos Railway and the Santa María power plant.
- Approved oil exploration contracts with US companies.
- Work Act
- Endorsed and encourage a national soap industry development.

==== The United Fruit Company ====
1. Dockworkers strike: In mid-1924, Puerto Barrios workers -key to banana transport- demanded an 8-hour day and increased wages. When UFCO refused to accept, workers went on strike, with the support from all workers in the farms of the frutera. UFCO asked the Guatemalan government for help, and Orellana quickly sent troops to restore order in Puerto Barrios; the collision was brutal and resulted in numerous workers injured or dead. The strike lasted 27 days, but repression tactics finished it: 22 leaders were jailed and then expelled from the country.
2. Railroad strike: In late 1924, the employees of International Railways of Central America (IRCA) demanded the reduction of working hours, higher wages and respect to their labor union. Railway Society. Again, the frutera flatly refused to accept these demands and ordered Orellana's government to violently repress the strike of five thousand workers.

=== Education ===
Following the fall of the government of Manuel Estrada Cabrera, Guatemala had a literacy rate of only 7 percent, educational coverage was very limited, and the proportion of untrained teachers was very high. As a result, educational reform became a priority, particularly among the indigenous population, which was widely perceived as illiterate. The educational project was based on the principle of desanalfabetización ("de-illiterization"), that is, the elimination of illiteracy. The term emphasized not merely teaching reading and writing but the eradication of illiteracy itself. Alongside this objective, the government sought to raise educational standards and strengthen civic instruction.

Given the large number of untrained teachers, the government organized several competitions to select the most promising teacher-training graduates and award them scholarships to continue their studies abroad. The intention was that they would return as professionally trained educators capable of training future teachers. The most significant outcome of this policy was the education of Juan José Arévalo Bermejo, who traveled to Argentina on one of these scholarships and later implemented many of the most important educational reforms in Guatemala during his presidency from 1945 to 1951.

Orellana facilitated the inauguration of the Society of Geography and History of Guatemala by granting it legal recognition. General Lázaro Chacón donated a lot located at 3a. avenida, 8–35, zona 1, where the society has remained ever since.

==== Popular University ====
Based on the principles of eliminating illiteracy, raising educational standards, and strengthening civic instruction that had been advanced during the government of Carlos Herrera y Luna, the Popular University was established in 1922, from which the educational project was strengthened and expanded. (Note: Popular universities originated in France and spread throughout Europe and Latin America during the first decades of the 20th century. In Latin America, the movement was associated with the emergence of a new political culture. In Mexico, the Popular University was founded in 1912 by members of the Ateneo de la Juventud, including José Vasconcelos, Antonio Caso, Alfonso Reyes, the Dominican Pedro Henríquez Ureña, and the Honduran Rafael Heliodoro Valle, who later helped disseminate the concept throughout the region.) The original idea came from the Colombian poet Porfirio Barba Jacob. The institution was founded on 20 August 1922 by a group of intellectuals belonging to the so-called Generation of 1920, including Epaminondas Quintana, David Vela, Miguel Ángel Asturias, and Carlos Fletes Sáenz.

The founding objectives of the Popular University focused on three central aspects of the educational problem:

1. Teaching literacy.
2. Providing general knowledge to social groups that, owing to circumstance, had been unable to acquire it.
3. Disseminating basic concepts of hygiene, civic education, and morality among the population in order to improve the physical and spiritual conditions of the masses. (Note: Because the elimination of illiteracy was regarded as the primary element of education, it occupied first place among the institution's objectives. After learning to read and write, workers were expected to gain access to general knowledge that would provide them with a basic educational foundation.)

==== Student criticism and closure of the National University ====
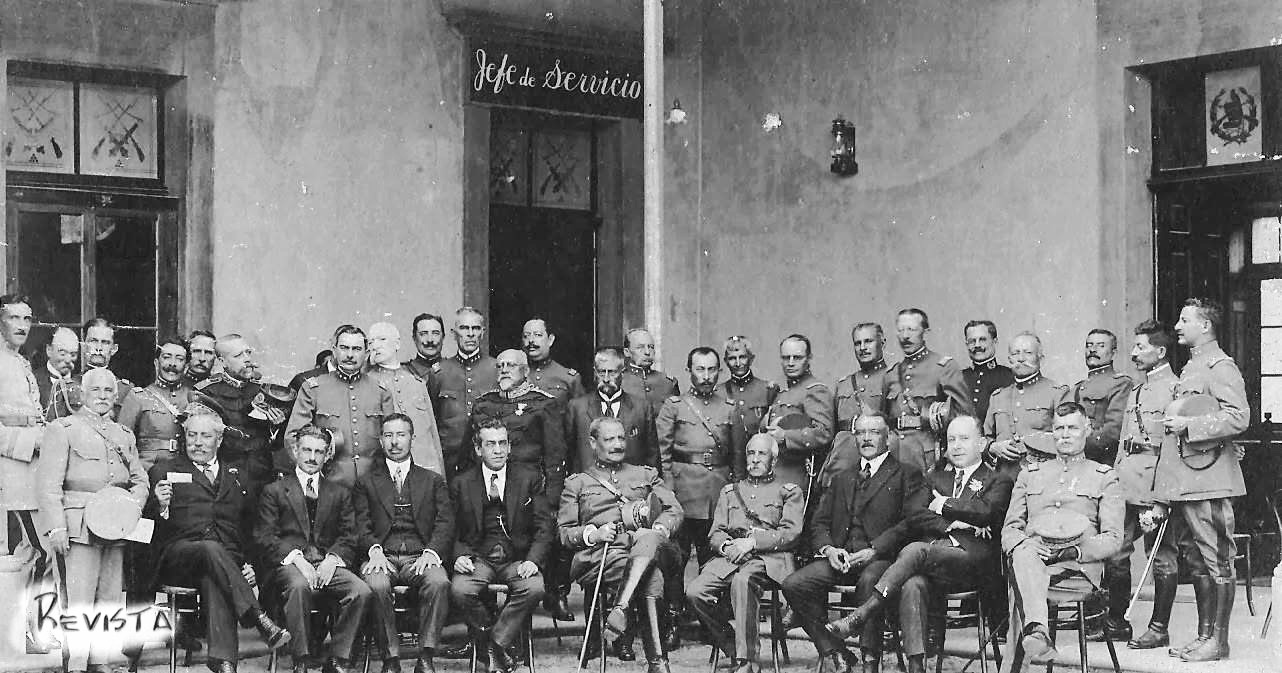
General José María Orellana (seated at center), accompanied by Major General José Gabriel Reyes Rodas and his staff inside the Escuela Politécnica after overthrowing President Carlos Herrera in the 1921 coup d'état.

In 1921, the traditions of publishing the student newspaper No Nos Tientes and holding the Desfile Bufo (the satirical parade of the Huelga de Dolores organized by students of the National University) were revived. At the beginning of Orellana's administration, the publication of No Nos Tientes and the parade were tolerated. Owing to their active participation in the overthrow of Estrada Cabrera as members of the Unionist Party movement, the government of Carlos Herrera had authorized them to use the former Manuel Cabral girls' school free of charge for meetings.

The activities were organized by students from the three academic faculties that existed at the time—Law, Medicine, and Pharmacy—whose leaders included David Vela, Epaminondas Quintana, Alfonso Orantes, José Luis Balcárcel, Joaquín Barnoya, Clemente Marroquín Rojas, and Miguel Ángel Asturias, among others.

However, following continued student protests against what they viewed as the government's submissive policies toward foreign interests, Orellana closed the National University. It would not reopen until September 1929, during the administration of Lázaro Chacón.

== Cultural references ==
- Rafael Arevalo Martinez talks about Orellana in numerous occasions in his biography of Estrada Cabrera ¡Ecce Pericles!.
- Orellana is also mentioned, though not by name, in the Guatemalan novels El Señor Presidente, Viernes de Dolores and Viento Fuerte of Nobel Laureate Miguel Angel Asturias. In Viernes de Dolores, Asturias calls Orellana by his nickname: Rapadurero. (Note: Rapadurero=Dark sugar man.)
- Given that during his rule the Quetzal was instituted as the Guatemalan currency, his image appears on the one quetzal bills, which are colloquially called "chemas". (Note: Chema=Colloquial name for people called José María in Guatemala.)
- His cousin, general Manuel María Contreras Orellana later would lead a coup against interim president Baudilio Palma in December 1930.

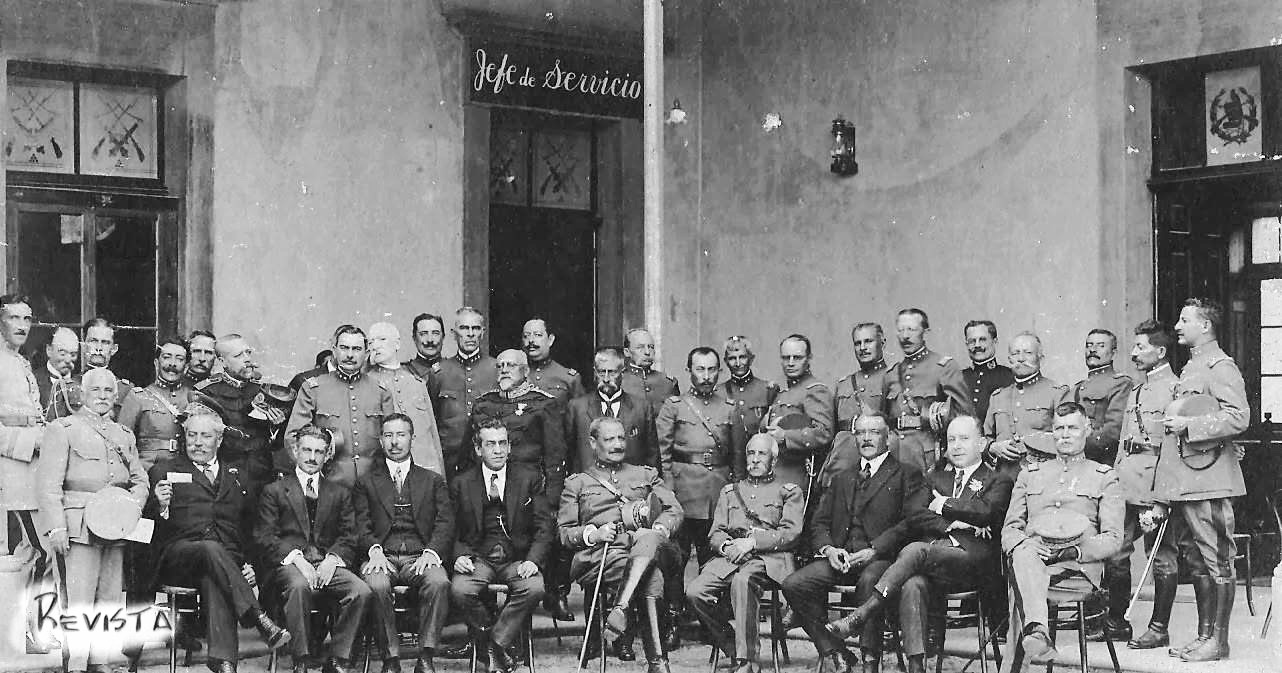
General José María Orellana and his staff after the coup d'état against president Carlos Herrera in 1921.

== Death ==
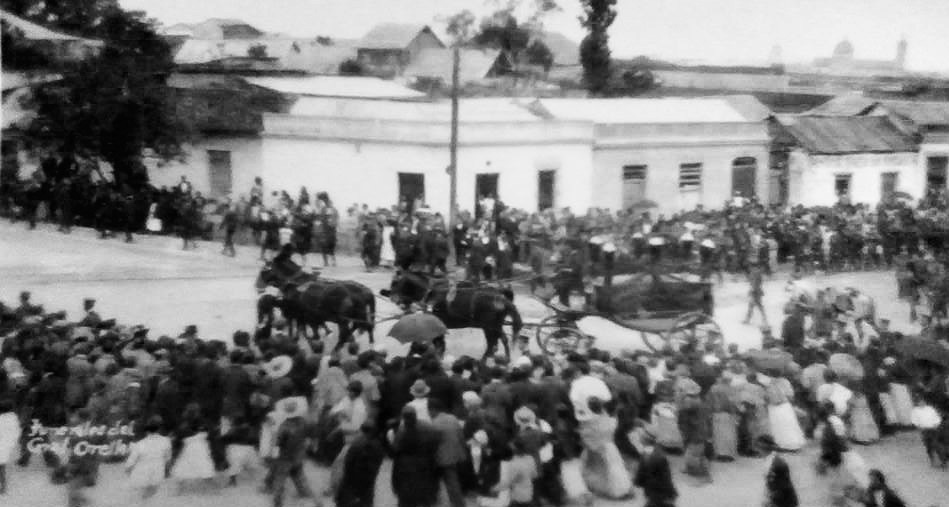
General Orellana funeral procession in 1926.

On 25 May 1926, El Imparcial – a private newspaper – had published a news flash: Martial law enacted which referred to executive decree 916, in which President Orellana had suspended the individual guarantees contained in the Constitution; the main reason for such decision was that "insidious and unpatriotic activities of certain elements" tended "to disrupt the peace and development of the country", which, at once, made it impossible to solve the national economic problem. Although El Imparcial was not circulating regularly in the previous days -due to a government boycott-, after 26 May it ceased publication indefinitely. Thereafter, only the official news outlets, such as Diario de Centro América and El Guatemalteco, could circulate, carrying irrelevant information. The story took a sudden turn on Sunday 26 September when, at 0:15 pm, Orellana died during a vacation trip to Antigua Guatemala; he was in a room at Hotel Manchén. "A violent angina attack ended the life of our illustrious president," explained Diario de Centro America in a special edition that day. These strange circumstances led to the suspicion that he was poisoned. General Lázaro Chacón assumed as interim President and immediately lifted Martial Law and allowed private newspaper to be published again.

== Bibliography ==
- Arévalo Martínez, Rafael (1945). ¡Ecce Pericles! (in Spanish). Guatemala: Tipografía Nacional.
- Asociación de Amigos del País (2004). Diccionario histórico biográfico de Guatemala (in Spanish) (1st ed.). Guatemala: Amigos del País, Fundación para la Cultura y el Desarrollo. ISBN 99922-44-01-1.
- Asturias, Miguel Ángel (1978). Viernes de Dolores (in Spanish). Buenos Aires: Lozada.
- Bauer Paz, Alfonso (1965). Compilación de leyes laborales de Guatemala de 1872 a 1930 (in Spanish). Guatemala: Centro de Estudios Económicos y Sociales, University of San Carlos of Guatemala.
- Fuentes Oliva, Regina (September 2012). "1920, una década de cambios educativos para Guatemala". Boletín AFEHC (in Spanish) (54).
- Hernández de León, Federico (December 1930). "Golpe de Estado contra presidente Baudilio Palma". Nuestro Diario (in Spanish). Guatemala.
- Hernández de León, Federico (1930a). El Libro de las Efemérides (in Spanish). Guatemala: Tipografía Sánchez y de Guise.
- Herrera y Luna, Carlos (April 1920). "Decretos del Organismo Ejecutivo". El Guatemalteco, Diario Oficial de la República de Guatemala - América Central (in Spanish). Guatemala.
- Villagrán Kramer, Francisco (1993). Biografía política de Guatemala (in Spanish). Vol. 1 (3rd ed.). Guatemala: FLACSO. p. 411. ISBN 9789993972815.
- Molina C., José (August 2011). "José María Orellana y el Quetzal". Prensa Libre (in Spanish). Guatemala. Archived from the original on 6 October 2014.
- "José María Orellana". Biografías y Vidas (in Spanish).
- Villalobos Viato, Roberto (August 2013). "La noticia nunca publicada por El Imparcial". Prensa Libre (in Spanish). Guatemala. Archived from the original on 29 August 2013.

== Notes ==
Preceded by Carlos Herrera	President of Guatemala; 1921–1926	Succeeded by Lázaro Chacón
