= El Jícaro, El Progreso =

El Jícaro
- Municipality
- Location in Guatemala
- Coordinates: 14°54′48″N 89°53′45″W
- Country: Guatemala
- Department: El Progreso

Government
  - Mayor: Francisco Mejía

Area
  - Municipality: 124 km^{2} (48 sq mi)

Population (2018 census)
  - Municipality: 13,128
  - Density: 106/km^{2} (274/sq mi)
  - Urban: 6,911
- Climate: BSh

El Jícaro is a town and municipality in the El Progreso department of Guatemala. Its population as of 2023 is 13,527.
