= Diario de Centro América =

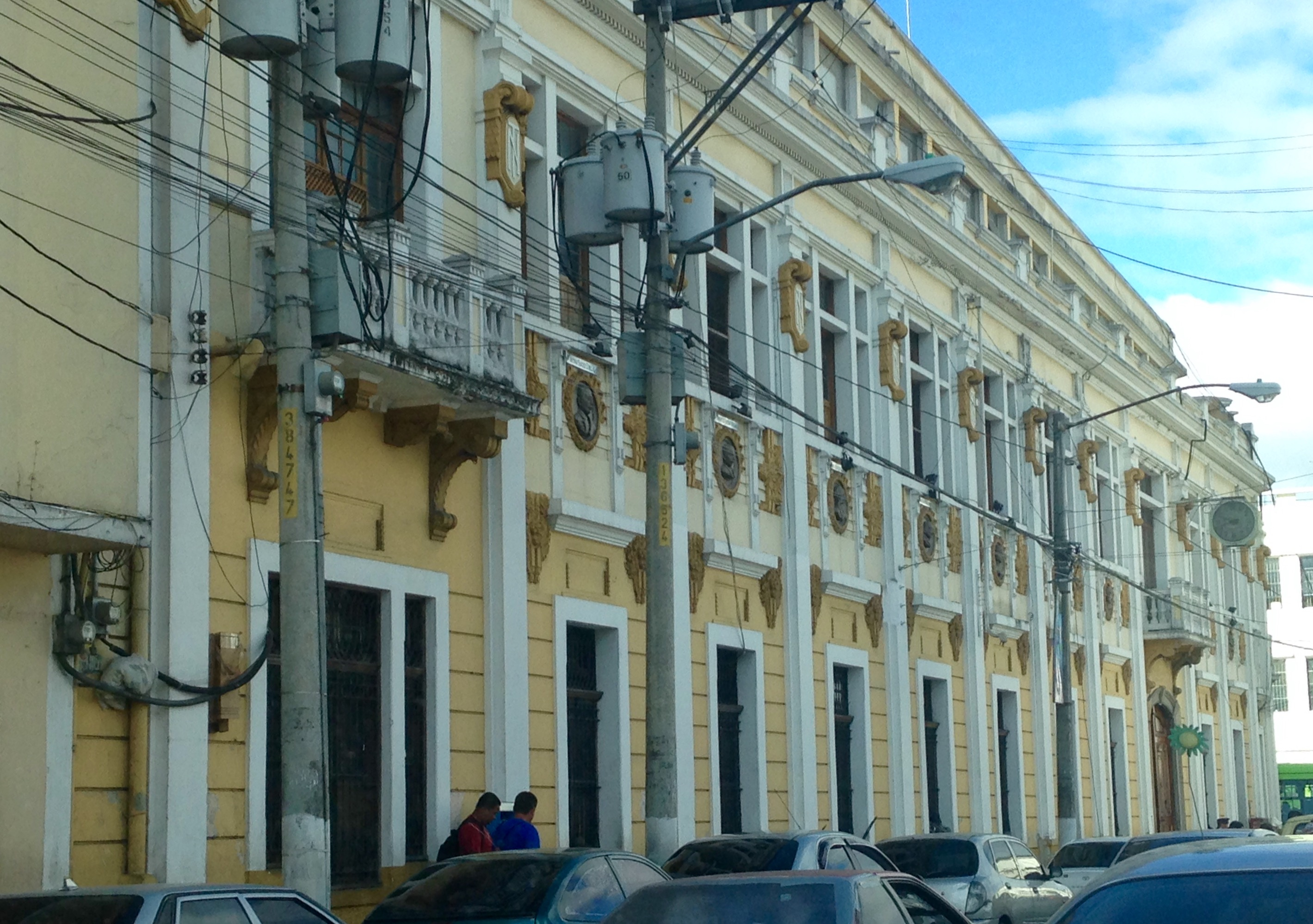
- Tipografia Nacional 2016
- Type: Newspaper of public record
- Owner: Government of Guatemala
- Founder: Marco J. Kelly (1844-1917)
- Editor-in-chief: Pedro Salinas Yela
- Editor: Héctor Salvatierra
- Founded: August 2, 1880
- Language: Spanish
- Headquarters: Casa Editora Tipografía Nacional, 18 calle 6-72, zona 1 Guatemala City 01001
- Website: dca.gob.gt

The Diario de Centro América is the newspaper of public record in Guatemala. Founded in 1880, it is the official newspaper of the country's government.
