= Anarchism in Guatemala =

Anarchism in Guatemala emerged from the country's labor movement in the late 19th century. Anarcho-syndicalism rose to prominence in the early 20th century, reaching its peak during the 1920s, before being suppressed by the right-wing dictatorship of Jorge Ubico.

== History ==
In 1871, Guatemala went through a "Liberal Revolution" that modernized the country, improved trade relations and introduced new crops and manufacturing processes. Under Liberal Party rule, the cultivation of coffee for export quickly became a significant part of the country's economy. Justo Rufino Barrios was elected President of Guatemala in the country's first elections and began a campaign to confiscate land from the indigenous people, redistributing them into the hands of a few landowners and creating a system of "farmland servitude", based on the exploitation of the native day laborers. Barrios issued a decree that placed the entire native population at the disposal of the new landowners, to work on their vast monoculture coffee plantations. This introduced a policy of forced labour, with laborers being buried in substantial debt to the landowners, requiring them to work for whichever landowner required their services. It was under these conditions that the Guatemalan labour movement began to emerge, organizing indentured workers to resist the landowning class, with the country's first trade union being formed in 1877.

By the turn of the 20th century, the internal coffee industry had collapsed and infrastructure projects were going unfinished. This led president Manuel Estrada Cabrera to begin offering concessions to the United Fruit Company, giving the corporation tax-exemptions, land grants and control of all railroads in the east of the country. Cabrera's rule turned despotic, violently putting down a number of workers' strikes against the United Fruit Company. This authoritarian turn by Cabrera was what brought anarchism into the limelight of Guatemalan left-wing politics, culminating in numerous assassination attempts being organized against Cabrera during his second term. In 1920, Cabrera was finally deposed by the Unionist Party, supported by many workers and students.

In December 1921, the new Unionist government of Carlos Herrera was overthrown in a liberal military coup, led by José María Orellana. Orellana reinstated the concessions to the United States companies and rich landowners. The growing labor movement began to protest against the new regime, leading to widespread rebellions throughout the country, with government reprisals against anarchists and communists. By this time, anarcho-syndicalism had already developed a significant presence in the Guatemalan workers' movement, with syndicalists founding the Federación Obrera de Guatemala (FOG) in 1922. Strikes began to break out throughout the country in the following years, but striking workers' faced fierce repression by the Orellana regime. In 1926, the Orientación Sindical began to be published in Guatemala, calling for trade unions to take up direct action, outside of and in opposition to the country's political parties. In 1928, Guatemalan anarcho-syndicalists founded the Comité Pro Acción Sindical (CPAS), which united workers' and student groups across the country.

However, this period of anarcho-syndicalist activity was brought to an end with the rise of Jorge Ubico and the Progressive Liberal Party to power, which transformed the country into a right-wing dictatorship. All public expressions of anarcho-syndicalism were suppressed by the dictatorship, including the dissolution of the Comité Pro Acción Sindical. Ubico continued to grant concessions to the United Fruit Company and wealthy landowners, supporting their harsh labor practices.

In 1944, Ubico was overthrown in a general strike, which eventually evolved into the Guatemalan Revolution. The left-wing Revolutionary Action Party took power and began a process of rapid industrialization in the country. The new government brought in a new Labor Code and syndicalism began to once again take hold, seeing the founding of the Comité Nacional de Unidad Sindical in 1946. But the gains of the revolution were lost in the US-backed 1954 Guatemalan coup d'état, which installed the right-wing dictatorship of Carlos Castillo Armas and the National Liberation Movement and the Guatemalan labor movement remained suppressed under a series of right-wing regimes. Today, the contemporary Guatemalan anarchist movement is a small part of the Guatemalan counter-culture.

== See also ==
- List of anarchist movements by region
- Anarchism in Mexico

== Bibliography ==
- Monteflores, Omar Lucas (2011). El Anarquismo en Guatemala: El Anarco Sindicalismo en la ciudad de Guatemala (1920-1932) (PDF) (Thesis) (in Spanish). Universidad de San Carlos de Guatemala.
- Monteflores, Omar Lucas (2020). "Anarchism and the Indigenous Peoples of Guatemala: A Tenuous Relation". Anarchist Studies. 28 (2): 76–92. doi:10.3898/AS.28.2.04. ISSN 2633-8270.
- Cappelletti, Angel J. (2018). Anarchism in Latin America. Translated by Gabirel Palmer-Fernández. Edinburgh: AK Press. p. 219. ISBN 9781849352826. OCLC 1044939183.
