= Right-wing dictatorship =

Authoritarian regime

A right-wing dictatorship, sometimes also referred to as a rightist dictatorship is an authoritarian or totalitarian regime following right-wing policies. Right-wing dictatorships are typically characterized by anti-communism, appeals to traditionalism, the protection of law and order, and nationalism. They justify their rise to power based on a need to uphold a conservative status quo.

== Characteristics of a right-wing dictatorship ==
=== Military dictatorship ===
In the most common Western view, the perfect example of a right-wing dictatorship is any of those that once ruled in South America. Those regimes were predominantly military juntas and most of them collapsed in the 1980s. Communist countries, which were very cautious about not revealing their authoritarian methods of rule to the public, were usually led by civilian governments and officers taking power were not much welcomed there. Few exceptions include the Burmese Way to Socialism (Burma, 1966–1988), the Military Council of National Salvation (People's Republic of Poland, 1981–1983) or the North Korean regime's evolution throughout the rule of Kim Il Sung.

=== Religion and the government ===
Many right-wing regimes kept strong ties with local clerical establishments. This policy of a strong Church-state alliance is often referred to as clerical fascism. Pro-Catholic dictatorships included the Estado Novo (1933–1974) and the Federal State of Austria (1934–1938). Many of those are/were led by spiritual leaders, such as the Slovak Republic under the Reverend Jozef Tiso. Some right-wing dictatorships, like Nazi Germany, were openly hostile to certain religions.

== Ideological alignment ==
Many right-wing dictatorships have opposed communism. Examples include Nazi Germany, Fascist Italy, Estado Novo, Francoist Spain, the Chilean Junta, the Greek Junta, the Brazilian military dictatorship, the Argentine Junta (or National Reorganization Process), Republic of China under Chiang Kai-shek, Indonesia's New Order regime by Suharto, Cuba under Fulgencio Batista, in South Korea when it was led by Syngman Rhee, Park Chung Hee, and Chun Doo-hwan, a number of military dictatorships in Latin America during the Cold War.

Some right-wing dicatorships align with anti-Western sentiments, such as Russia under Vladimir Putin.

== Right-wing dictatorships by region ==
The authoritarian politics of several countries can range from parties and movements on the center-right to the far-right, including some that are difficult to define. The degree of authoritarianism can also vary.

Cases supported by various sources and definitions will be presented below:

=== Europe ===
The existence of right-wing dictatorships in Europe are largely associated with the rise of fascism. The conditions created by World War I and its aftermath gave way both to revolutionary socialism and reactionary politics. Fascism arose as part of the reaction to the socialist movement, in attempt to recreate a perceived status quo ante bellum. Right-wing dictatorships in Europe were mostly destroyed with the Allied victory in World War II, although some continued to exist in Southern Europe until the 1970s.

List of European right-wing dictatorships

Country	Historical name(s)	Movement(s)	Years of rule	Dictator(s)
Albania	(Albania) Albanian Republic (1925–1928); (Albanian Kingdom (1928–1939)) Albanian Kingdom	Conservative Party; House of Zogu	1925–1928; 1928–1939	Ahmed Zogu / Zog I
Austria	(Austria) First Austrian Republic; Federal State of Austria	Fatherland Front	1932–1934; 1934–1938	Engelbert Dollfuss; Kurt Schuschnigg
Bulgaria	Kingdom of Bulgaria	Democratic Alliance; Zveno; House of Saxe-Coburg and Gotha-Koháry	1923–1926; 1934–1935; 1935–1943	Aleksandar Tsankov; Kimon Georgiev; Boris III
Estonia	Republic of Estonia	Patriotic League	1934–1940	Konstantin Päts
France	(France) French State	Révolution nationale	1940–1944	Philippe Pétain; Philippe Pétain with Pierre Laval (after 1942)
Germany	German Empire; (Nazi Germany) German Reich	Military; National Socialist German Workers' Party	1916–1918; 1933–1945	Wilhelm II, Erich Ludendorff; Adolf Hitler
Greece	Second Hellenic Republic; Kingdom of Greece; Kingdom of Greece	Military; 4th of August Regime; Regime of the Colonels	1925–1926; 1936–1941; 1967–1974	Theodoros Pangalos; Ioannis Metaxas; Georgios Tsolakoglou, Konstantinos Logothetopoulos, Ioannis Rallis; Georgios Papadopoulos
Hungary	Kingdom of Hungary	Unity Party	1920–1944	Miklós Horthy
Italy	(Fascist Italy) Kingdom of Italy	National Fascist Party	1922–1943	Benito Mussolini
Latvia	Republic of Latvia	Latvian Farmers' Union (disbanded after coup)	1934–1940	Kārlis Ulmanis
Lithuania	Republic of Lithuania	Lithuanian Nationalist Union	1926–1940	Antanas Smetona
Ottoman Empire	(Ottoman Empire) Sublime Ottoman State; (Ottoman Empire) Sublime Ottoman State	House of Osman; Committee of Union and Progress	1878–1908; 1913–1918	Abdul Hamid II; The Three Pashas
Poland	Republic of Poland	Military with Sanation (BBWR); Military with Sanation (Camp of National Unity)	1926/1930–1935; 1935–1939	Józef Piłsudski; The "Colonels"
Portugal	(Portugal) Portuguese First Republic; (Portugal) Portuguese First Republic; (Portugal) Ditadura Nacional; (Portugal) Estado Novo	Military; National Republican Party; Military; National Union	1915; 1917–1918; 1926–1933; 1933–1974	Joaquim Pimenta de Castro; Sidónio Pais; Óscar Carmona; António de Oliveira Salazar, Marcelo Caetano
Roman Republic	Roman Republic	Optimates	82–79 BC	Lucius Cornelius Sulla Felix
Romania	Kingdom of Romania; (Romania) National Legionary State; Kingdom of Romania	National Renaissance Front; Military with the Iron Guard; Military	1938–1940; 1940–1941; 1941–1944	Carol II; Ion Antonescu with Horia Sima; Ion Antonescu
Russia	(Russia) Russian State; (Russia) Russian Federation	White movement; United Russia/All-Russia People's Front	1918–1920; 2003–present	Alexander Kolchak; Vladimir Putin
San Marino	Republic of San Marino	Sammarinese Fascist Party	1923–1943	Giuliano Gozi
Spain	(Restoration (Spain)) Kingdom of Spain; (Francoist Spain) Spanish State	Spanish Patriotic Union; Falange	1923–1930; 1939–1975	Miguel Primo de Rivera; Francisco Franco
Ukraine	Ukrainian State	Ukrainian People's Hromada	1918	Pavlo Skoropadskyi
(Kingdom of Yugoslavia) Yugoslavia	Kingdom of Yugoslavia	Yugoslav National Party; Yugoslav Radical Union	1929–1934; 1934–1941	Alexander I; Milan Stojadinović, Dragiša Cvetković

=== Asia ===
Right-wing dictatorships in Asia emerged during the early 1930s, as military regimes seized power from local constitutional democracies and monarchies. The phenomenon soon spread to other countries with the military occupations driven by the militarist expansion of the Empire of Japan. After the end of World War II, Asian right-wing dictatorships took on a decidedly anti-communist role in the Cold War, with many being backed by the United States. Contemporarily, some scholars and journalists have described China's neoauthoritarianism as right-wing, and the regime is widely regarded as socially conservative and nationalist. However, whether the Chinese government today can be classified as right wing is still a highly contested topic among scholars, with some argue that right and left label does not fit neatly in the context of China.

List of Asian right-wing dictatorships

Country	Historical name(s)	Movement(s)	Years of rule	Dictator(s)
Afghanistan	Republic of Afghanistan; Islamic Emirate of Afghanistan	National Revolutionary Party of Afghanistan; Taliban	1973–1978; 1996–2001; 2021–present	Mohammad Daoud Khan; Mullah Omar; Hibatullah Akhundzada
Azerbaijan	Republic of Azerbaijan	New Azerbaijan Party	1993–2003; 2003–present	Heydar Aliyev; Ilham Aliyev
Bangladesh	People's Republic of Bangladesh	Military with the Bangladesh Nationalist Party; Military with the Jatiya Party	1977–1981; 1982–1990	Ziaur Rahman; Hussain Muhammad Ershad
Cambodia	Kingdom of Cambodia (1953–70); Khmer Republic; Kingdom of Cambodia	Sangkum; Social Republican Party; Cambodian People's Party	1955–1970; 1970–1975; 1998–present	Norodom Sihanouk; Lon Nol; Hun Sen, Hun Manet
China	Empire of China	Military	1915–1916	Yuan Shikai
Cyprus	Republic of Cyprus	EOKA B	1974	Nikos Sampson
Georgia	(Georgia (country)) Georgia	Georgian Dream	2025–present	Bidzina Ivanishvili with Irakli Kobakhidze
Indonesia	Republic of Indonesia	New Order under Golkar	1966–1998	Suharto
Iran	Imperial State of Iran; Islamic Republic of Iran	Military with the Iran Novin Party; Military with the Rastakhiz Party; Military; Islamic Republican Party; Traditional Right; Principlists; Principlists and Islamic Revolutionary Guard Corps	1953–1963; 1963–1975; 1975–1978; 1979; 1979–1989; 1989–2026; 2026–Present	Mohammad Reza Pahlavi; Mohammad Reza Pahlavi; Mohammad Reza Pahlavi; Mohammad Reza Pahlavi; Ruhollah Khomeini; Ali Khamenei; Mojtaba Khamenei
Iraq	Hashemite Kingdom of Iraq; Republic of Iraq	Golden square with the Party of National Brotherhood; Arab Socialist Ba'ath Party – Iraq Region	1941; 1979–2003	Rashid Ali al-Gaylani; Saddam Hussein
Japan	Empire of Japan	Imperial Way Faction; Control Faction; Imperial Rule Assistance Association	1931 – 1936; 1936–1940; 1940–1945	Hirohito and Sadao Araki; Hirohito and Hideki Tojo; Hirohito and Hideki Tojo
Kazakhstan	Republic of Kazakhstan	Amanat	1999–2019	Nursultan Nazarbayev
South Korea	(South Korea) Republic of Korea; (South Korea) Republic of Korea; (South Korea) Republic of Korea; (South Korea) Republic of Korea; (South Korea) Republic of Korea	Liberal Party; Military; Democratic Republican Party; Democratic Republican Party; Democratic Justice Party	1948–1960; 1961–1963; 1963–1972; 1972–1979; 1980–1987	Syngman Rhee; Park Chung Hee; Park Chung-hee; Park Chung-hee; Chun Doo-hwan
Laos	Kingdom of Laos	Military with the Committee for the Defence of National Interests	1959–1960; 1960; 1960–1962	Phoumi Nosavan; Kong Le; Phoumi Nosavan
Malaysia	Malaysia	UMNO	1981–2003	Mahathir Mohamad
Manchuria, China	Manchukuo	Concordia Association	1932–1945	Puyi with Zheng Xiaoxu and Zhang Jinghui
Myanmar	State of Burma; Union of Myanmar; Republic of the Union of Myanmar	Military; Military with the Union Solidarity and Development Association; Military with the Union Solidarity and Development Party	1943–1944; 1962– 1988; 1988–2010; 2021–present	Ba Maw; Than Shwe; Min Aung Hlaing
Pakistan	Islamic Republic of Pakistan	Military with the Pakistan Muslim League; Military with the Pakistan Muslim League; Military with the Pakistan Muslim League	1958–1971; 1977–1988; 1999–2008	Ayub Khan, Yahya Khan; Muhammad Zia-ul-Haq; Pervez Musharraf
Philippines	(First Philippine Republic) Dictatorial Government; Second Philippine Republic; Republic of the Philippines	Military; Kapisanan ng Paglilingkod sa Bagong Pilipinas; Kilusang Bagong Lipunan	1898; 1943–1945; 1972–1986	Emilio Aguinaldo; Jose P. Laurel; Ferdinand Marcos
Singapore	Republic of Singapore	People's Action Party	1965–1990	Lee Kuan Yew
Syria	(Syria) Syrian Republic	Military with the Arab Liberation Movement	1951–1954	Adib Shishakli
Tajikistan	Republic of Tajikistan	People's Democratic Party of Tajikistan	1994–present	Emomali Rahmon
China (1928–1949); Taiwan (1945–1987)	(Taiwan) Republic of China; Republic of China; (Taiwan) Republic of China	Right-wing Kuomintang	1928–1949; 1940–1945; 1949–1987	Chiang Kai-shek (Note: Whether Chiang Kai-shek's early rule can be seen as a 'right-wing' dictatorship is debatable. During the 1920s and early 1930s, Chiang and supporters was seen as a 'centrist' among 'right-wing' Hu Hanmin supporters and 'left-wing' Wang Jingwei supporters, but the Chinese Communist Party (or Maoism) later emerged as the main rival of the KMT, making Chiang's rule a 'right-wing' dictatorship. Other historians argue that Chiang's ideology differed from 'right-wing' dictators of the 20th century and that he did not espouse the ideology of fascism.); Wang Jingwei, Chen Gongbo; Chiang Kai-shek, Chiang Ching-kuo
Thailand	Kingdom of Thailand	People's Party; Seri Manangkhasila Party; National Socialist Party; United Thai People's Party; Military with the National Council for Peace and Order and United Thai Nation Party	1933–1938; 1938 – 1957; 1959–1963; 1963–1973; 2014–2023	Phraya Phahonphonphayuhasena; Plaek Phibunsongkhram; Sarit Thanarat; Thanom Kittikachorn; Prayut Chan-o-cha
Turkey	Republic of Turkey; Republic of Turkey	Military; Justice and Development Party	1980–1983; 2016–present	General Kenan Evren; Recep Tayyip Erdoğan
Turkmenistan	Turkmenistan	Democratic Party of Turkmenistan	1991–2006; 2006–2022; 2022–2023; 2023–present	Saparmyrat Nyýazow; Gurbanguly Berdimuhamedow; Serdar Berdimuhamedow; Serdar Berdimuhamedow with Gurbanguly Berdimuhamedow
Uzbekistan	Republic of Uzbekistan	Uzbekistan Liberal Democratic Party	1991–2016; 2016–present	Islam Karimov; Shavkat Mirziyoyev
Southern Vietnam	(South Vietnam) Republic of Vietnam	Personalist Labor Revolutionary Party; Military; Military; Military; National Social Democratic Front	1956–1963; 1963–1964; 1964; 1965–1967; 1967–1975	Ngo Dinh Diem; Dương Văn Minh; Nguyễn Khánh; Dương Văn Minh; Nguyễn Văn Thiệu

=== Latin America and the Caribbean ===
Right-wing dictatorships largely emerged in Central America and the Caribbean during the early 20th century. Sometimes they arose to provide concessions to American corporations such as the United Fruit Company, forming regimes that have been described as "banana republics". North American right-wing dictatorships were instrumental in suppressing their countries' labour movements and instituting corporatist economies. During the Cold War, these right-wing dictatorships were characterized by a distinct anti-communist ideology, and often rose to power through US-backed coups. Many of the right-wing dictatorships that existed in South America started a campaign of political repression known as Operation Condor which involved intelligence operations, coups, and assassinations of left-wing sympathizers in South America. Operation Condor formally existed from 1975 to 1983 and it was supported by the United States.

List of Latin American and Caribbean right-wing dictatorships

Country	Historical name(s)	Movement(s)	Years of rule	Dictator(s)
Northern Argentina	Argentine Confederation	Military with the Federalist Party	1829–1832; 1835–1852	Juan Manuel de Rosas
Argentina	(Argentina) Argentine Republic; (Argentina) Argentine Republic; (Argentina) Argentine Republic; (Argentina) Argentine Republic	Military with the Nationalist Liberation Alliance; Concordanica; Concordanica; Concordanica; Military; Military; Military; Military; Military; Military; Military; Military; Military; Military; Military	1930–1932; 1932–1938; 1938–1942; 1940–1942; 1943; 1943–1944; 1944–1946; 1955–1958; 1966–1970; 1970–1971; 1971–1973; 1976–1981; 1981; 1981–1982; 1982–1983	José Félix Uriburu; Agustín Pedro Justo; Roberto María Ortiz; Ramón Castillo; Arturo Rawson; Pedro Pablo Ramírez; Edelmiro Julián Farrell; Pedro Eugenio Aramburu; Juan Carlos Onganía; Roberto Marcelo Levingston; Alejandro Agustín Lanusse; Jorge Rafael Videla; Roberto Eduardo Viola; Leopoldo Galtieri; Reynaldo Bignone
Bolivia	Republic of Bolivia; Republic of Bolivia	Military with the Popular Christian Movement; Military; Military with the Nationalist Union of the People; Military; Military; Military	1966–1969; 1971–1978; 1978; 1979; 1980–1981; 1981–1982	René Barrientos; Hugo Banzer; Juan Pereda; Alberto Natusch; Luis García Meza; Celso Torrelio
Brazil	Republic of the United States of Brazil; Republic of the United States of Brazil; Federative Republic of Brazil	None; Military with the National Renewal Alliance; Military with the National Renewal Alliance; Military with the National Renewal Alliance; Military with the National Renewal Alliance; Military with the Democratic Social Party	1937–1945; 1964–1967; 1967–1969; 1969–1974; 1974–1979; 1979–1985	Getúlio Vargas; Humberto de Alencar Castelo Branco; Artur da Costa e Silva; Emílio Garrastazu Médici; Ernesto Geisel; João Figueiredo
Chile	Republic of Chile; Republic of Chile; Republic of Chile	Military	1924–1925; 1927–1931; 1973–1990	Luis Altamirano; Carlos Ibáñez del Campo; Augusto Pinochet
Colombia	Republic of Colombia	Colombian Conservative Party; Military	1950–1953; 1953–1957	Laureano Gómez; Gustavo Rojas Pinilla
Costa Rica	(First Costa Rican Republic) Republic of Costa Rica	Military with the Peliquista Party	1917–1919	Federico Tinoco Granados
Cuba	Republic of Cuba	Liberal Party of Cuba; Military with the Progressive Action Party	1927–1933; 1952–1959	Gerardo Machado; Fulgencio Batista
Dominican Republic	Third Dominican Republic; Dominican Republic	Military with the Dominican Party; Military with the Dominican Party; Social Christian Reformist Party	1930–1961; 1961; 1966–1978	Rafael Trujillo; Ramfis Trujillo; Joaquín Balaguer
Ecuador	Republic of Ecuador; Republic of Ecuador	Military with the Conservative Party; Military; Velaquista National Federation	1860–1865; 1869–1875; 1963–1966; 1970–1972	Gabriel García Moreno; Gabriel García Moreno; Ramón Castro Jijón; José María Velasco Ibarra
El Salvador	Republic of El Salvador	Military with the National Pro Patria Party; Military with the Social Democratic Unification Party; Military with the Revolutionary Party of Democratic Unification; Military with the Revolutionary Party of Democratic Unification; Military with the National Conciliation Party; Military with the National Conciliation Party; Military with the National Conciliation Party; Military with the National Conciliation Party; Nuevas Ideas	1931–1944; 1945–1948; 1948–1956; 1956–1960; 1962–1967; 1967–1972; 1972–1977; 1977–1979; 2019–present	Maximiliano Hernández Martínez; Salvador Castaneda Castro; Óscar Osorio; José María Lemus; Julio Adalberto Rivera Carballo; Fidel Sánchez Hernández; Arturo Armando Molina; Carlos Humberto Romero; Nayib Bukele
Grenada	Grenada	Grenada United Labour Party	1974–1979	Eric Gairy
Guatemala	Republic of Guatemala	Military with the Liberal Party; Progressive Liberal Party; Military with the National Liberation Movement; Military with the National Liberal Movement; Military	1921–1926; 1931–1944; 1954–1957; 1970–1974; 1982–1983	José María Orellana; Jorge Ubico; Carlos Castillo Armas; Carlos Manuel Arana Osorio; Efraín Ríos Montt
Haiti	Republic of Haiti; Republic of Haiti	National Unity Party; National Unity Party; Military	1957–1971; 1971–1986; 1991–1994	François Duvalier; Jean-Claude Duvalier; Raoul Cédras
Honduras	Republic of Honduras	Military with the National Party	1933–1949; 1963–1975; 1975–1978; 1978–1982	Tiburcio Carías Andino; Oswaldo López Arellano; Juan Alberto Melgar Castro; Policarpo Paz García
Mexico	(Centralist Republic of Mexico) Mexican Republic; (Second Federal Republic of Mexico) United Mexican States; (Mexico) Mexican Republic; (Mexico) United Mexican States	Military with the Conservative Party; Military with the Conservative Party; Military with the Conservative Party; Military with the National Porfirist Party; Military with the National Porfirist Party; Military with the National Porfirist Party; Military	1839–1839; 1845–1846; 1853–1855; 1876; 1877–1880; 1884–1911; 1913–1914	Antonio López de Santa Anna; Mariano Paredes; Antonio López de Santa Anna; Porfirio Díaz; Porfirio Díaz; Porfirio Díaz; Victoriano Huerta
Nicaragua	Republic of Nicaragua	Nationalist Liberal Party	1936–1956; 1956–1967; 1967–1979	Anastasio Somoza García; Luis Somoza Debayle; Anastasio Somoza Debayle
Panama	Republic of Panama	Panameñista Party; Military with the National Patriotic Coalition	1949–1951; 1952–1955; 1983–1989	Arnulfo Arias; José Antonio Remón Cantera; Manuel Antonio Noriega
Paraguay	Republic of Paraguay; Republic of Paraguay	Military; Military with the Colorado Party	1940–1948; 1954–1989	Higinio Morínigo; Alfredo Stroessner
Peru	(Peru) Peruvian Republic; (Peru) Peruvian Republic; Republic of Peru; Republic of Peru	Revolutionary Union; Revolutionary Union; Military; Military; Cambio 90; Vamos Vecino	1930; 1931–1933; 1933–1939; 1948–1956; 1975–1980; 1992–2000	Luis Miguel Sánchez Cerro; Óscar R. Benavides; Manuel A. Odría; Francisco Morales Bermúdez; Vladimiro Montesinos with Alberto Fujimori
Uruguay	Oriental Republic of Uruguay; Oriental Republic of Uruguay	Colorado Party; Military with the Colorado Party; Military with the Colorado Party; Military with the National Party; Military	1934–1938; 1973–1976; 1976; 1976–1981; 1981–1985	Gabriel Terra; Juan María Bordaberry; Alberto Demicheli; Aparicio Méndez; Gregorio Conrado Álvarez
Venezuela	United States of Venezuela; United States of Venezuela; United States of Venezuela; Republic of Venezuela	Military	1899–1908; 1908–1913; 1922–1929; 1931–1935; 1948–1950; 1952–1958	Cipriano Castro; Juan Vicente Gómez; Juan Vicente Gómez; Juan Vicente Gómez; Carlos Delgado Chalbaud; Marcos Pérez Jiménez

=== Africa ===
Africa has experienced several military dictatorships which makes up the majority of right-wing dictatorships that have existed. Dictatorships like the hereditary dictatorship in Togo (especially under Gnassingbé Eyadéma) had strong anti-communist and pro-Western stances which are in contrast to left-wing governments that existed in other African nations around the time. Regimes like Zaire and Rwanda under Habyarimana have sometimes been called fascist. Zaire featured what their dictator called a "neither right nor left" position but was recognized by historians as a right-wing regime and its state ideology of Mobutism has sometimes been seen as a Third Position ideology. Rwanda under Habyarimana has been compared to fascist regimes such as Nazi Germany for their Hutu supremacist policies against the Tutsi's as well as the Rwandan genocide that occurred after the assassination of Habyarimana sometimes being compared to the Holocaust.

List of African right-wing dictatorships

Country	Historical name(s)	Movement(s)	Years of rule	Dictator(s)
Burkina Faso	Republic of Upper Volta	Military	1966–1980	Sangoulé Lamizana
Burundi	Republic of Burundi	National Council for the Defense of Democracy – Forces for the Defense of Democracy	2005–2020; 2020–present	Pierre Nkurunziza; Évariste Ndayishimiye
Cameroon	Republic of Cameroon	Cameroon People's Democratic Movement	1982–present	Paul Biya
Chad	Republic of Chad	National Union for Independence and Revolution; Military with the Patriotic Salvation Movement; Military with the Patriotic Salvation Movement	1982–1990; 1991–2021; 2022–present	Hissène Habré; Idriss Déby; Mahamat Déby
Democratic Republic of the Congo	Republic of Zaire	Military with the Popular Movement of the Revolution	1965–1997	Mobutu Sese Seko
Egypt	Arab Republic of Egypt	Nation's Future Party	2014–present	Abdel Fattah el-Sisi
Gabon	(Gabon) Gabonese Republic	Gabonese Democratic Party	1967–2009; 2009–2023	Omar Bongo; Ali Bongo
Gambia	(The Gambia) Republic of the Gambia	Alliance for Patriotic Reorientation and Construction	1996–2017	Yahya Jammeh
Guinea	Republic of Guinea	Military with the Unity and Progress Party	1984–2008	Lansana Conté
Equatorial Guinea	Republic of Equatorial Guinea	United National Workers' Party; Military; Military; Democratic Party of Equatorial Guinea	1968–1979; 1979–1982; 1982–1987; 1987–present	Francisco Macías Nguema; Teodoro Obiang Nguema Mbasogo
Ivory Coast	First Republic of Ivory Coast	Democratic Party of Ivory Coast – African Democratic Rally	1960–1993; 1993–1999	Félix Houphouët-Boigny; Henri Konan Bédié
Kenya	Republic of Kenya	Kenya African National Union	1964–1978; 1978–2002	Jomo Kenyatta; Daniel arap Moi
Lesotho	Kingdom of Lesotho	Basotho National Party	1970–1986	Leabua Jonathan
Liberia	Republic of Liberia	Military with the National Democratic Party of Liberia	1986–1990	Samuel Doe
Malawi	Republic of Malawi	Malawi Congress Party	1966–1994	Hastings Banda
Mauritania	Islamic Republic of Mauritania	Military with the Republican Party for Democracy and Renewal; Military with the Union for the Republic	1984–2005; 2009–2019	Maaouya Ould Sid'Ahmed Taya; Mohamed Ould Abdel Aziz
Niger	Republic of the Niger	Military with the National Movement for the Society of Development	1987–1993	Ali Saibou
Rwanda	(Rwanda) Rwandese Republic; Republic of Rwanda	Parmehutu; Military with the National Revolutionary Movement for Development; Rwandan Patriotic Front	1962–1973; 1973–1994; 1994; 2000–Present	Grégoire Kayibanda; Juvénal Habyarimana; Théoneste Bagosora; Paul Kagame
South Africa	Union of South Africa	National Party	1948–1994	D. F. Malan; J. G. Strijdom; Hendrik Verwoerd; John Vorster; P. W. Botha; F. W. de Klerk
Sudan	Republic of the Sudan	Military with the National Congress Party	1989–2019	Omar al-Bashir
Togo	(Togo) Togolese Republic	Military with the Rally of the Togolese People; Union for the Republic; Union for the Republic; Union for the Republic	1967–2005; 2005–2024; 2024–2025; 2025–present	Gnassingbé Eyadéma; Faure Gnassingbé; Victoire Tomegah Dogbé with Faure Gnassingbé; Faure Gnassingbé
Transkei	Republic of Transkei	Transkei National Independence Party	1979–1986	Kaiser Matanzima
Tunisia	Republic of Tunisia	25th of July Movement	2021–Present	Kais Saied
Uganda	Second Republic of Uganda; Republic of Uganda	Military; National Resistance Movement	1971–1979; 2006–present	Idi Amin; Yoweri Museveni
Zimbabwe	Republic of Rhodesia	Rhodesian Front	1964–1979	Ian Smith

== See also ==
- Left-wing dictatorship
- Authoritarian capitalism
- Authoritarian conservatism
- Films depicting Latin American military dictatorships
- Military government
- Neoauthoritarianism in China
- Police state
- Operation Condor

== Bibliography ==
- Schmitz, David F. (1999). Thank God They're on Our Side: The United States and Right-wing Dictatorships, 1921–1965. Chapel Hill: University of North Carolina Press. ISBN 0807847739. OCLC 901305850.
- Schmitz, David F. (2006). The United States and Right-wing Dictatorships, 1965-1989. Cambridge: Cambridge University Press. ISBN 0521678536. OCLC 61295816.
- Shirer, William L. (1960). The Rise and Fall of the Third Reich. New York: Simon & Schuster. LCCN 60-6729.
