= Comité Pro Acción Sindical =

Guatemalan trade union federation

Committee for Union Action
- Comité Pro Acción Sindical
- Abbreviation: CPAS
- Predecessor: Nueva Senda
- Merged into: Confederation of Workers of Guatemala
- Formation: 8 January 1928; 98 years ago
- Dissolved: January 1932; 94 years ago
- Type: Trade union federation
- Headquarters: Guatemala City, Guatemala
- Members: 1,000 (1929)
- Leader: Manuel Bautista Grajeda
- Main organ: Orientación Sindical
- Affiliations: International Workers' Association; American Continental Workers' Association

The Committee for Union Action (Spanish: Comité Pro Acción Sindical; (Note: Also translated as the Committee for Trade Union Activity or the Pro-Action Union Committee.) CPAS) was a Guatemalan trade union federation. Established in 1928 by an anarchist group led by Manuel Bautista Grajeda, the CPAS organized trade unions in several of the country's industries, most notably sugar workers. It also built solidarity between predominantly mestizo urban workers and Indigenous rural workers, and it established ties with the international syndicalist movement through the American Continental Workers' Association. The anarcho-syndicalist organization grew to include several trade union affiliates and around 1,000 members, although it remained a minority in the Guatemalan labor movement and frequently clashed with Communist-led unions. The CPAS was suppressed in 1932 by the dictatorship of Jorge Ubico. Members of the CPAS reemerged following the Guatemalan Revolution of 1944, but they were not able to organize any more anarchist-led unions. The CPAS would remain the largest anarchist organization in Guatemalan history.

== Background ==
Following the independence of Guatemala in the early 19th century, a capitalist economy based on the export of the country's agricultural products developed. Under this system, large landowners kept Indigenous workers in involuntary servitude, and any expression of rebellion was punished severely. The first Guatemalan workers' organizations were established in the 1890s, when construction workers and printing workers began to organize themselves into craft unions. The first Guatemalan anarchists came largely from the urbanized Mestizo and Ladino populations, who adopted anarchist theories to resist institutional racism in Guatemala. Through contact with French and Mexican anarchists, who frequently protested the oppression of Indigenous agricultural workers in Guatemala, anarchism began to spread in Guatemala during the early 20th century. Magonists campaigned to establish workers' organizations in the country, but the dictatorship of Manuel Estrada Cabrera precluded the success of any such initiatives. It was through the influence of Mexican Revolutionaries and the Nicaraguan rebel Augusto César Sandino that land reform, Indigenous rights and national liberation were taken up by Guatemalan anarchists.

Cabrera unsuccessfully attempted to court the nascent labor movement by establishing a government-backed trade union federation, but his government was ultimately toppled by an alliance between more radical sections of organized labor and the conservative Unionist Party. When the Cabrera regime collapsed in 1920, independent workers' organizations began to organize openly for the first time, although these were largely urban phenomena and remained opposed to Indigenous struggles for autonomy. Restrictions against freedom of assembly by the government of Carlos Herrera radicalized the nascent labor movement, which moved towards socialism and established the Socialist Workers Unification (UOS). Following the seizure of power by José María Orellana, who became the country's new military dictator, many UOS members were arrested, killed or driven underground. The majority of UOS members were further radicalized towards anarcho-syndicalism, while a minority formed the Communist Party of Guatemala (PCG). The anarchists and communists came together to establish the Regional Workers' Federation of Guatemala (FROG), which counted 2,000 members and 11 unions.

== Establishment ==
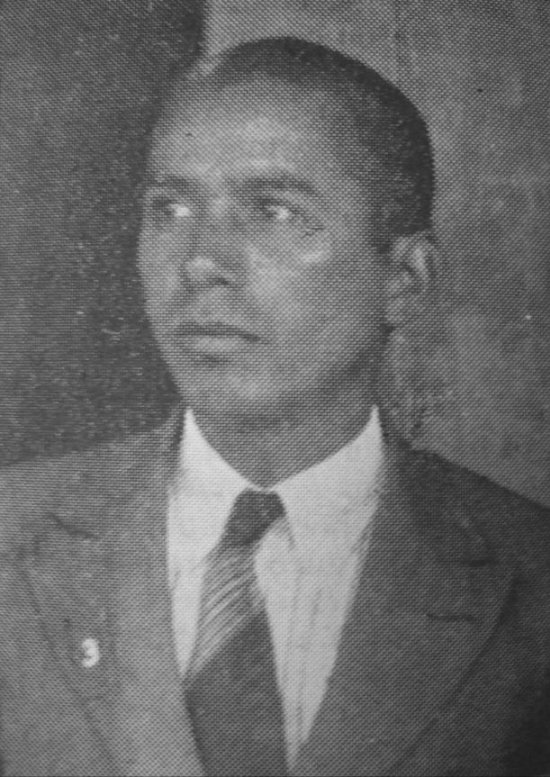
Manuel Bautista Grajeda, co-founder and leader of the CPAS

By 1925, the Guatemalan labor movement was becoming increasingly combative, with a series of strike actions being carried out by bakers, coffee farmers and seamstresses, as well as dockers and railway workers. Under the Unionist government of Lázaro Chacón González, elected in 1926, workers' organizations gained an amount of freedom of association, which gave way to the growth and consolidation of the Guatemalan trade unionist movement. In September 1925, Julio Díaz, a representative of the Argentine Regional Workers' Federation (FORA), visited Guatemala to encourage the establishment of anarchist organizations in the country.

Influenced by Díaz, in October 1926, Guatemalan anarchists led by Manuel Bautista Grajeda formed the Nueva Senda (English: New Path) collective. The group established the Tailors' Society, the country's first anarchist-led trade union, as well as trade unions of masons and wood workers. They also began corresponding with the international anarchist movement. The group established the newspaper Orientación Sindical, which called for unions to take direct action, independent from political parties. Following the model of their Argentine and Mexican counterparts, Nueva Senda began to view the Indigenous peasantry as a revolutionary class and started to organize workers in the sugar plantations on the country's south coast. They were also joined by anarcho-syndicalist migrant workers from Peru and Spain. Bautista Grajeda worked together with Nicolás Gutarra, a veteran of the Peruvian Regional Workers' Federation (FORPe), to establish a trade union federation in Guatemala.

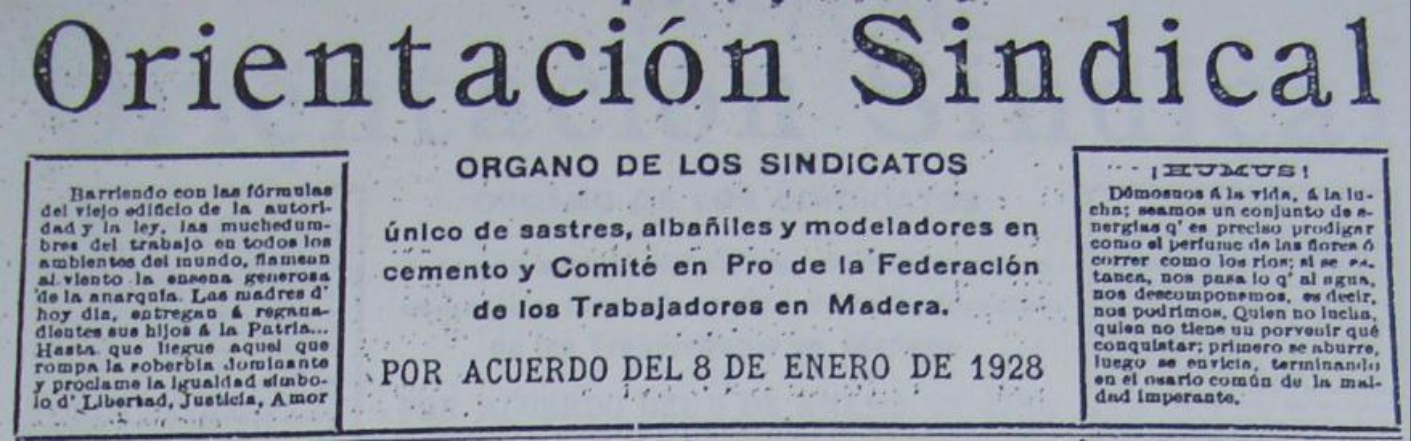
Orientación Sindical, the official newspaper of the CPAS

This organization process culminated on 8 January 1928, with the establishment of the Committee for Union Action (Spanish: Comité Pro Acción Sindical; CPAS). Its founding congress brought together unions of bricklayers, carpenters, cement workers, joiners, tailors and wood workers; Gutarra gave the closing speech, emphasizing the necessity of trade union organization to provide collective defense for the working class against capitalism. The CPAS adhered to anarcho-syndicalist ideals, aiming to unite the working class, while rejecting political party affiliation and relations with governing institutions. The CPAS upheld direct action, trade union organization and revolutionary spontaneity as means to bring about an egalitarian, classless society. The CPAS declared itself an organization "of the people to free the people", and quickly grew to become the country's largest anarchist organization. Although it was predominantly an organization of urban workers based in Guatemala City, it incorporated rural workers' demands and Indigenous rights into its platform. It affiliated itself with the International Workers' Federation (AIT). Orientación Sindical became its official organ, with José Victor Guzmán as its director. Bautista Grajeda would be the organization's main leader.

== Activities ==
The CPAS was active in Guatemala throughout the late 1920s. In May 1928, the CPAS sent a delegation to the rural El Progreso Department, where they agitated local workers to form reading groups and trade unions to respond to the region's problems. Anarchist commissions also organized sugar workers in the southern departments of Escuintla and Retalhuleu and dockworkers in Puerto San José. At a conference of "libertarian syndicalist" sugar workers in Escuintla, the CPAS established a local sugar workers' union, which called for a 25% increase in salaries and a six-hour day for all workers. In Retalhuleu, the CPAS delegates discovered that sugar workers were working 10-hour days, without overtime pay, and were often dismissed without the legally-mandated notice period. They subsequently established an Autonomous Union in Retalhuleu. According to Spanish anarchist Manuel Villar, the CPAS built relations with four labor organizations in the Guatemalan interior. In conversations in the interior about a possible war with Honduras, the anarchists took a pacifist and internationalist position. The contact between urban Mestizo workers and rural Indigenous workers concerned the country's authorities, who had previously used racism to divide the working class and now worried about urban workers joining an Indigenous-led rebellion.

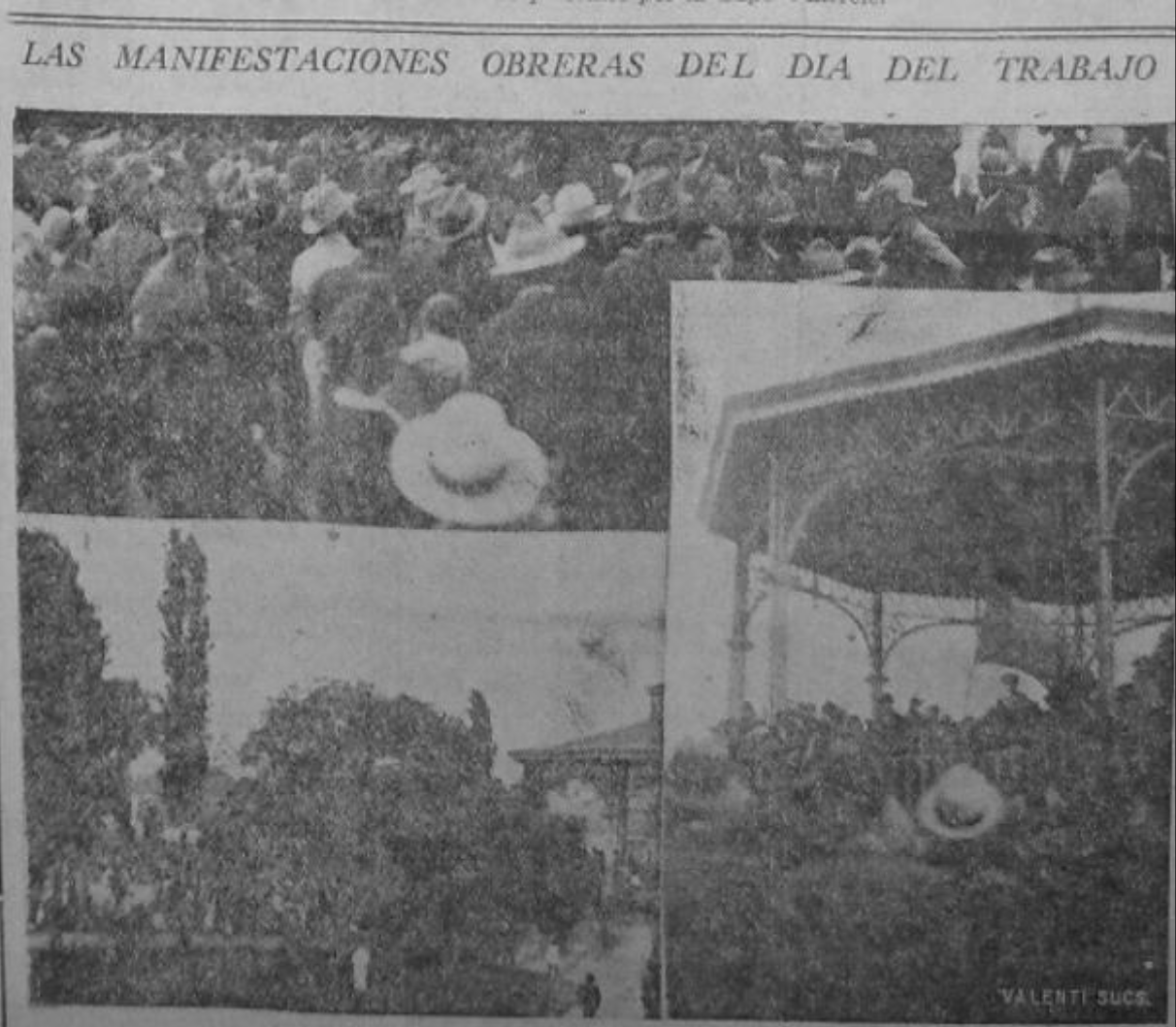
International Workers' Day demonstration in Guatemala City in 1929, during which anarchists and communists clashed in Parque Concordancia

By the summer of 1928, the CPAS included unions of construction workers, metalworkers, news vendors, shoemakers and textile workers, in addition to its founding sections. It also organized a union for unemployed workers. Eight of the fourteen unions previously affiliated with the FROG joined the CPAS. The CPAS often clashed with the communist-led FROG, as the former accused the latter of collaborating with the government, while the latter denounced the former as a representative of the "petite bourgeoisie". The organizations held separate demonstrations on the International Workers' Days of 1928 and 1929, during which members of both organizations attacked each other. The government often exploited the divisions between the two factions, resulting in the weakening of the labor movement. Police presence at workers day demonstrations increased, in part due to the violent clashes between the anarchists and communists. By 1929, only 6.67% of Guatemalan workers were organized into trade unions; the majority were in the reformist and communist-led unions, while the CPAS itself counted roughly 1,000 members (representing 1/12 of organized workers).

In May 1929, the CPAS co-founded the American Continental Workers' Association (ACAT), together with the FORA, the Mexican General Confederation of Workers (CGT) and other Latin American anarcho-syndicalist organizations. At the founding congress of the ACAT, CPAS delegate Manuel Bautista Grajeda called for the organization to recognize Indigenous struggles and unite with Indigenous peoples in rebellion. The ACAT subsequently defined itself as a heterogeneous confederation of workers' and peasants' organizations and proclaimed it would engage with Indigenous struggles.

== Suppression ==
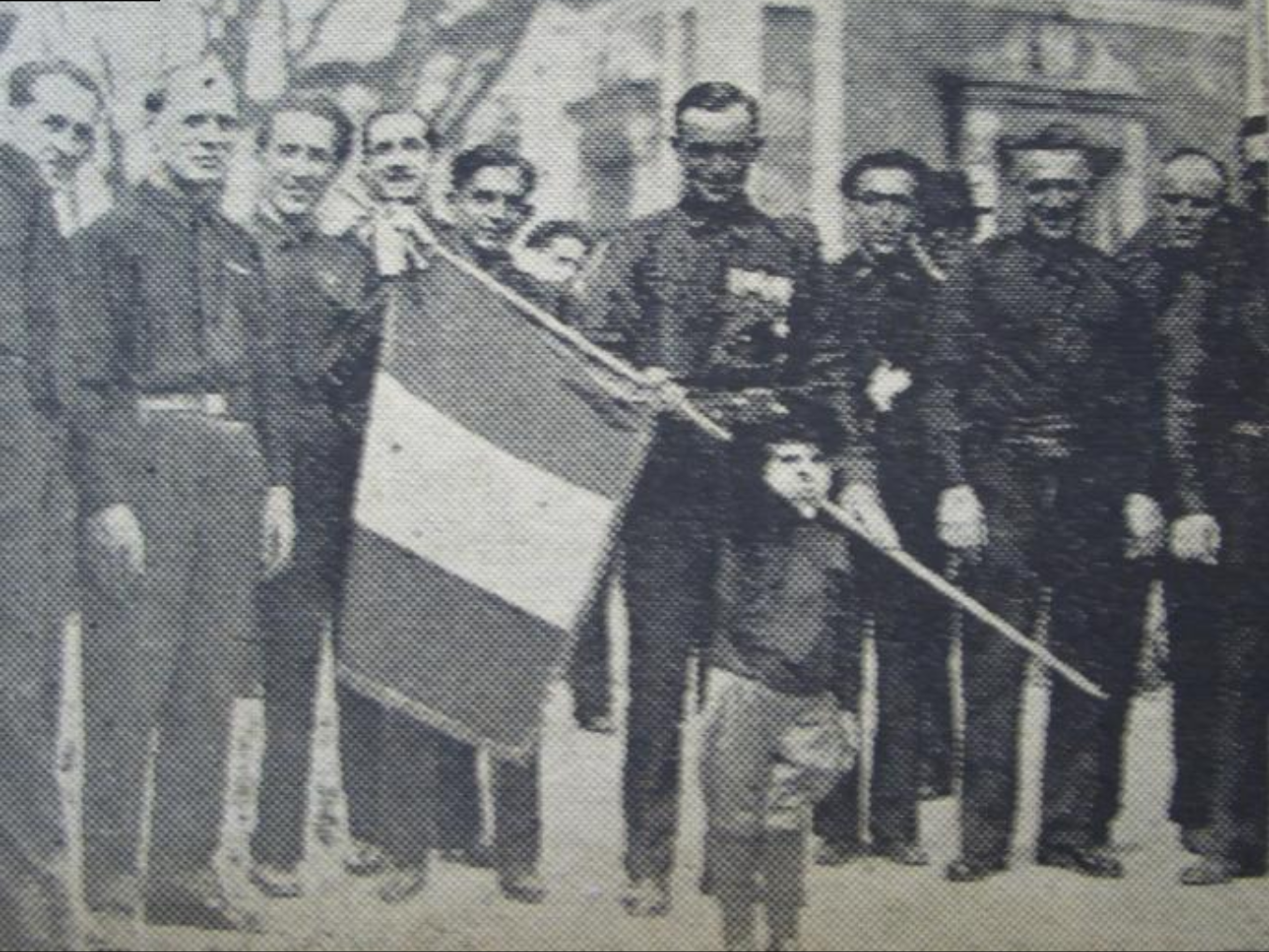
Fascist blackshirts demonstrating in support of Jorge Ubico's suppression of the Guatemalan anarchist movement, in February 1932

Following the outbreak of the Great Depression and a rising climate of political repression in Guatemala, the CPAS and the wider Guatemalan anarchist movement collapsed into disorganization; Guatemalan historian Arturo Taracena Arriola could not find any information about the activities of the CPAS during the early 1930s. In 1931, the rise to power of a new dictatorship, under President Jorge Ubico, put an end to the nascent anarchist labor movement and suppressed the CPAS. The labor movement, divided between its anarchist, communist and reformist factions, was too weak to stop the repression. From December 1931 to January 1932, cordon and search operations were conducted in cities, during which union activists (including Bautista Grajeda) were arrested and imprisoned. The state also suppressed a series of rural uprisings and restricted freedom of movement for rural workers.

By the end of the operation, 400 union leaders had been arrested. According to an article sent by an anonymous Guatemalan anarchist to the ACAT in September 1932, the dictatorship had arrested and tortured almost all members of the CPAS, who were charged with rebellion and lèse-majesté. The remaining anarchists were driven into hiding, and the organized movement collapsed. In February 1932, Bautista Grajeda was charged with treason, and state prosecutors called for him to be executed. However, the military tribunal found no evidence that he had carried out any treasonous actions and declared they could not prosecute him for his ideology alone. He was released, but due to the political climate of the dictatorship, he was not able to return to trade union activism. By 4 April 1932, all of the country's trade unions had ceased operations. In 1936, Bautista Grajeda was arrested while attempting to organize prisoner support and imprisoned for 8 years.

== Aftermath ==
The Guatemalan Revolution of 1944, which overthrew Ubico, allowed anarchist organizations to reemerge and resume their activities. Former members of the CPAS, including Bautista Grajeda and Guzmán, formed an anarchist group called the Libertarios (English: Libertarians), which worked within the Confederation of Workers of Guatemala (CTG), a new trade union federation. However, none of the new trade unions that were formed had an anarchist orientation; they were largely pro-government or communist-aligned. Although they were composed predominantly of urban mestizo workers, they again attempted to reach out to rural Indigenous groups and embraced calls for land reform. According to Guatemalan historian Simon Lucas Monteflores, the CPAS was the largest and most powerful anarchist organization in the country's history. Arturo Taracena Arriola says that most Guatemalans are not aware of the history of their country's anarchist movement.

== Bibliography ==
- Alexander, Robert J. (2008). A History of Organized Labor in Panama and Central America. Parker, Eldon M. Praeger Publishers. ISBN 978-0-275-97740-5.
- Alexander, Robert J.; Parker, Eldon M. (2009). International Labor Organizations and Organized Labor in Latin America and the Caribbean: A History. ABC-Clio. ISBN 978-0-275-97739-9.
- Cappelletti, Angel J. (2018). Anarchism in Latin America. Translated by Gabirel Palmer-Fernández. Edinburgh: AK Press. p. 219. ISBN 9781849352826. OCLC 1044939183.
- Damier, Vadim (2009) [2000]. Anarcho-syndicalism in the 20th Century. Translated by Archibald, Malcolm. Edmonton: Black Cat Press. ISBN 978-0-9737827-6-9.
- Monteflores, Omar Lucas (2011). El Anarquismo en Guatemala: El Anarco Sindicalismo en la ciudad de Guatemala (1920-1932) [Anarchism in Guatemala: Anarcho-Syndicalism in Guatemala City (1920-1932)] (PDF) (Thesis) (in Spanish). Universidad de San Carlos de Guatemala. Archived from the original (PDF) on 17 July 2012.
- Monteflores, Omar Lucas (2020). "Anarchism and the Indigenous Peoples of Guatemala: A Tenuous Relation". Anarchist Studies. 28 (2): 76–92. doi:10.3898/AS.28.2.04. ISSN 2633-8270.
- Rocker, Rudolf (1989) [1938]. Anarcho-Syndicalism. Pluto Press. ISBN 0-7453-1392-2.
- Shaffer, Kirwin R. (2020). Anarchists of the Caribbean: Countercultural Politics and Transnational Networks in the Age of US Expansion. Cambridge University Press. ISBN 978-1-108-48903-4.
- Taracena Arriola, Arturo (1988). "Presencia anarquista en Guatemala entre 1920 y 1932" [Anarchist presence in Guatemala between 1920 and 1932]. Mesoamérica. 9 (15): 1–23. ISSN 0252-9963.
