= April 1920 Guatemalan presidential election =

- 8 April 1920
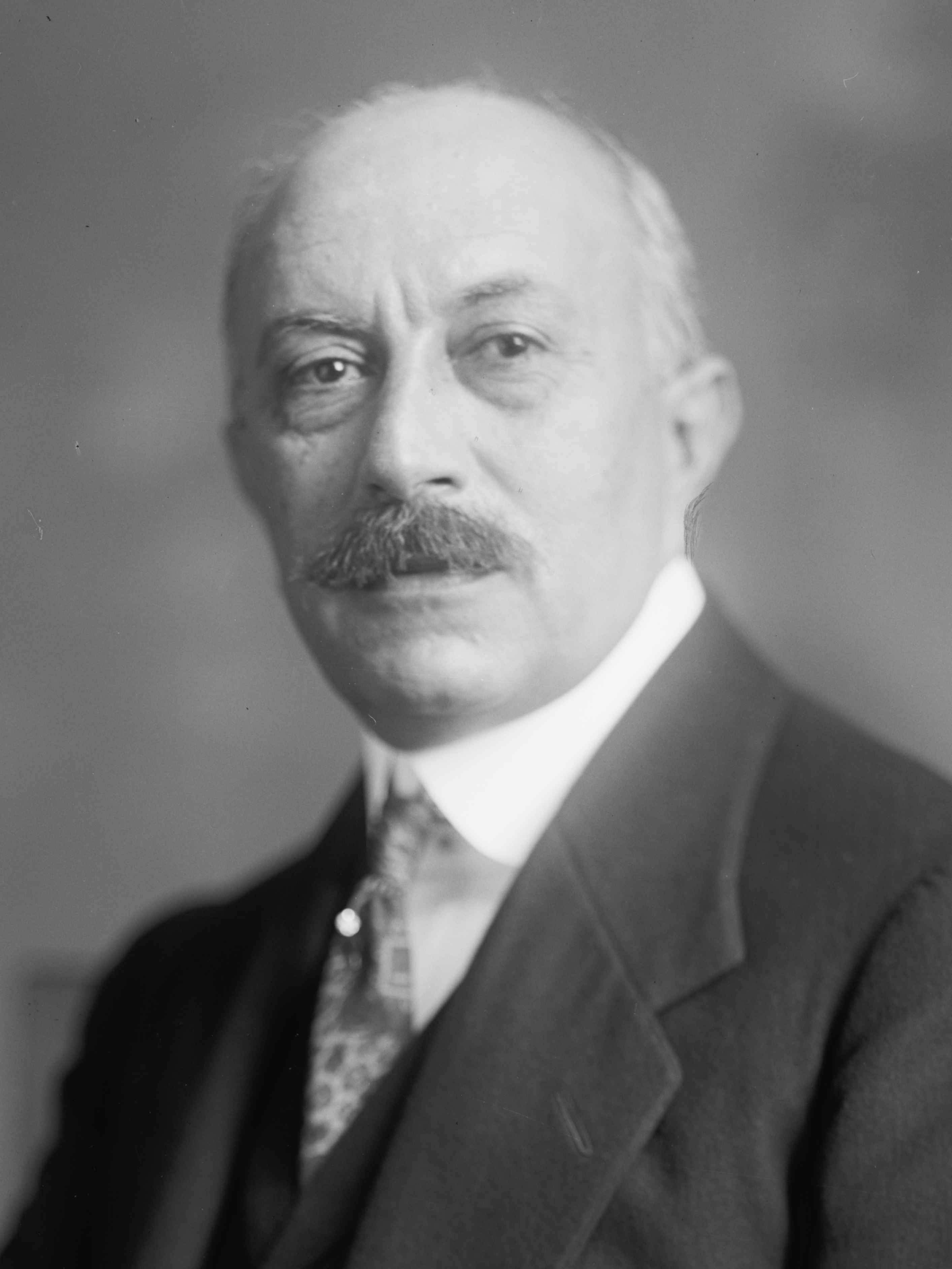

Nominee	Carlos Herrera	Adrián Vidaurre
Party	PU	Independent
Electoral vote	36	6
Percentage	85.71%	14.29%
President before election
Manuel Estrada Cabrera
Liberal Party
President-elect
Carlos Herrera y Luna
PU–PD

Indirect presidential elections were held in Guatemala on 8 April 1920. After two decades of repression and dictatorial rule, political opponents of Manuel Estrada Cabrera organized the Unionist Party (PU) in 1919. Led by Conservatives tied to the landed oligarchy, the Unionists also attracted support among the urban proletariat, artisans, students, and industrialists.

In January 1920 the Unionists allied with dissident Liberals in the legislature led by Adrian Vidaurre. Toward the end of March 1920 the Unionists began to pressure the National Legislative Assembly to impeach Estrada Cabrera. Even those who had benefitted from his rule accepted that Cabrera should step down. On 8 April he was declared insane and no longer capable of governing the country by members of the Legislative Assembly. They then voted to replace him with Carlos Herrera y Luna (36 out of 42 voted for him). On 9 April Cabrera ordered troops still loyal to him to bomb the Unionist-held Guatemala City, but on 15 April Congress accepted his resignation.

== Bibliography ==
- Calvert, Peter. Guatemala : a nation in turmoil. Boulder: Westview Press. 1985.
- Díaz Romeu, Guillermo. “ Del régimen de Carlos Herrera a la elección de Jorge Ubico.” Historia general de Guatemala. 1993–1999. Guatemala: Asociación de Amigos del País, Fundación para la Cultura y el Desarrollo. Volume 5. 1996.
- Holden, Robert H. Armies without nations: public violence and state formation in Central America, 1821–1960. New York: Oxford University Press. 2004.
- Jiménez, Ernesto Bienvenido. Ellos los presidentes. Guatemala: Editorial José de Pineda Ibarra. 1981.
- Krehm, William. Democracia y tiranias en el Caribe. Buenos Aires: Editorial Parnaso. 1957.
- Rendón, Catherine. “El gobierno de Manuel Estrada Cabrera.” Historia general de Guatemala. 1993–1999. Guatemala: Asociación de Amigos del País, Fundación para la Cultura y el Desarrollo. Volume 5. 1996.
- Schlewitz, Andrew James. The rise of a military state in Guatemala, 1931–1966. New York: New School University. Unpublished dissertation. 1999.
