= 1920 presidential election =

1920 presidential election may refer to:

- Chilean presidential election, 1920
- Guatemalan presidential election, April 1920
- Guatemalan presidential election, August 1920
- Panamanian presidential election, 1920
- 1920 United States presidential election
