= 1873 Guatemalan general election =

- November 1873
- Presidential election
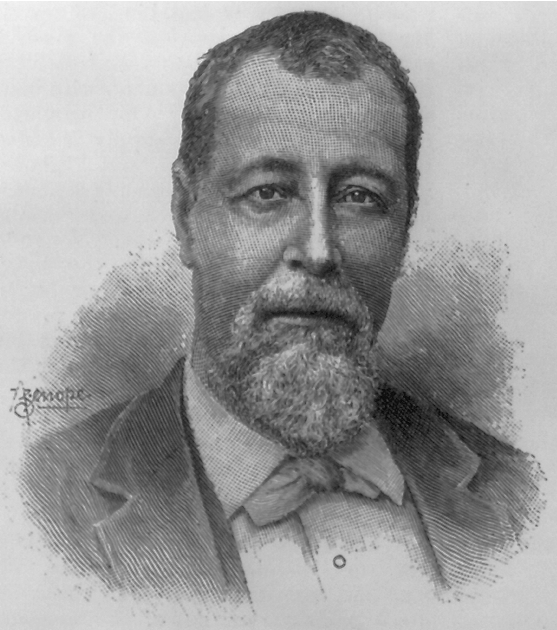

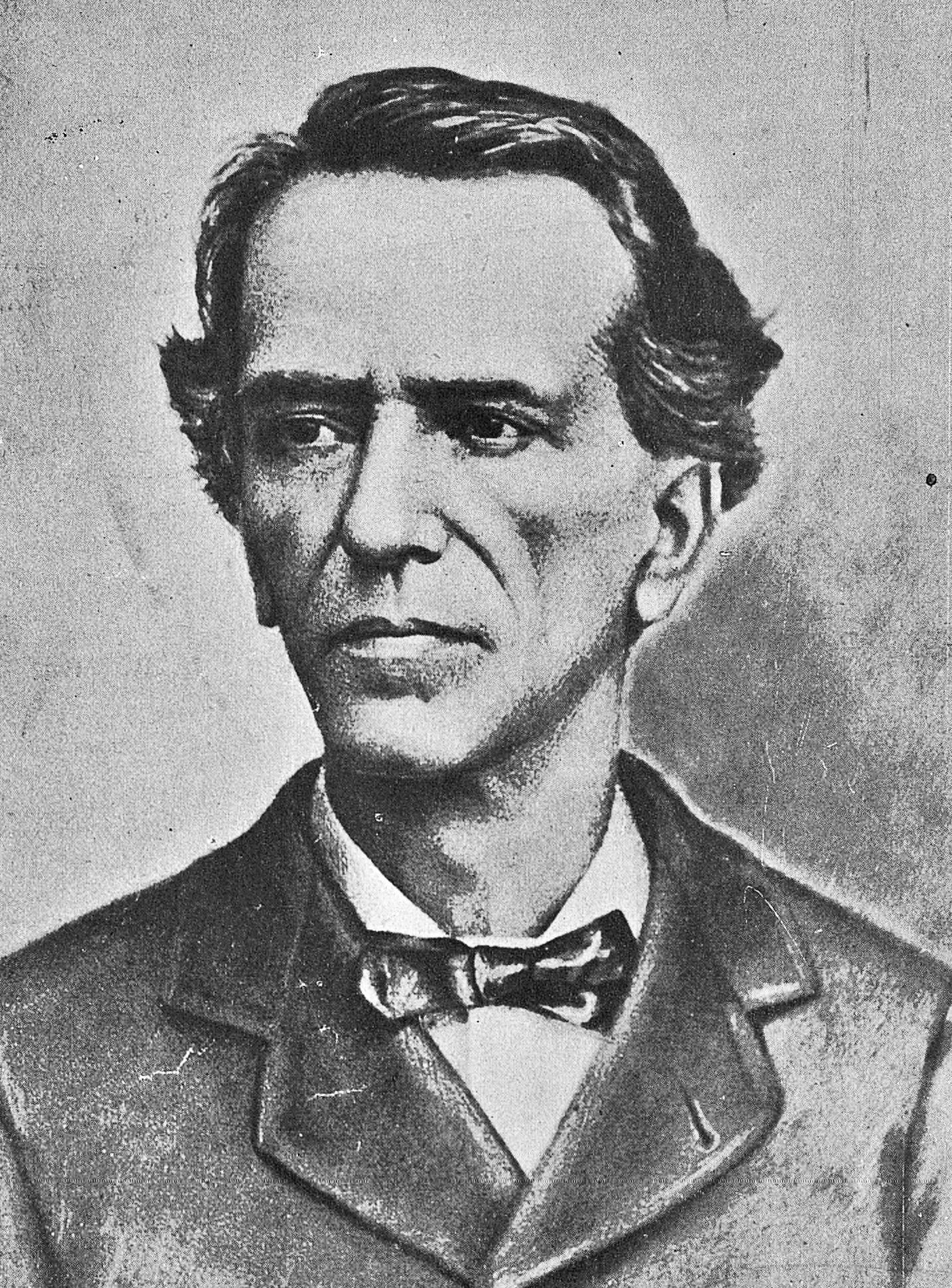
Nominee	Justo Rufino Barrios	Miguel García Granados
Party	Liberal	Liberal
Popular vote	6,572	1,419
Percentage	75.48%	16.30%
President before election
Miguel García Granados
Liberal
President-elect
Justo Rufino Barrios
Liberal

Presidential elections were held in Guatemala in November 1873. The result was a victory for Justo Rufino Barrios.

== Results ==
Candidate	Party	Votes	%
Justo Rufino Barrios	Liberal Party	6,572	75.48
Miguel García Granados	Liberal Party	1,419	16.30
Vicente Cerna	Conservative Party	1	0.01
25 other candidates		715	8.21
Total		8,707	100.00
Source: IIJ, SAT

== Bibliography ==
- Villagrán Kramer, Francisco. Biografía política de Guatemala: años de guerra y años de paz. FLACSO-Guatemala, 2004.
- González Davison, Fernando. El régimen Liberal en Guatemala (1871–1944). Guatemala: Universidad de San Carlos de Guatemala. 1987.
- Dosal, Paul J. Power in transition: the rise of Guatemala's industrial oligarchy, 1871-1994. Westport: Praeger. 1995.
- Holden, Robert H. Armies without nations: public violence and state formation in Central America, 1821-1960. New York: Oxford University Press. 2004.
- LaCharité, Norman A., Richard O. Kennedy, and Phillip M. Thienel. Case study in insurgency and revolutionary warfare: Guatemala, 1944-1954. Washington, D.C.: Special Operations Research Office, American University. 1964.
- Luján Muñoz, Jorge. Las revoluciones de 1897, la muerte de J.M. Reina Barrios y la elección de M. Estrada Cabrera. Guatemala: Artemis Edinter. 2003.
- Taracena Arriola, Arturo. "Liberalismo y poder político en Centroamérica (1870-1929)." Historia general de Centroamérica. 1994. San José: FLACSO. Volume 4.
