= 1923 Guatemalan parliamentary election =

Parliamentary elections were held in Guatemala in December 1923. The result was a victory for the Liberal Party, which won all 69 seats. Liberal candidates won overwhelming victories in every constituency, a result that the American diplomatic corps described as farcical.

== Results ==
Party	Seats
Liberal Party	69
Progressive Liberal Party	0
Conservative Party	0
Total	69

== Bibliography ==
- Political Handbook of the world, 1928. New York, 1929.
