= 1892 Guatemalan presidential election =

- January 1892
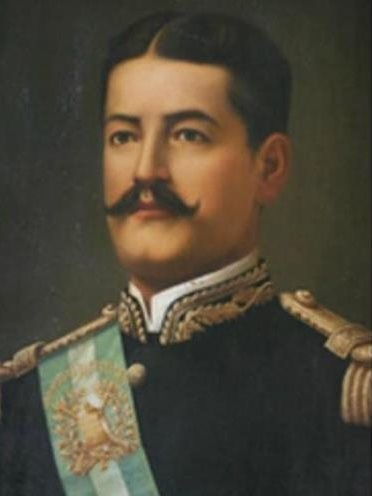

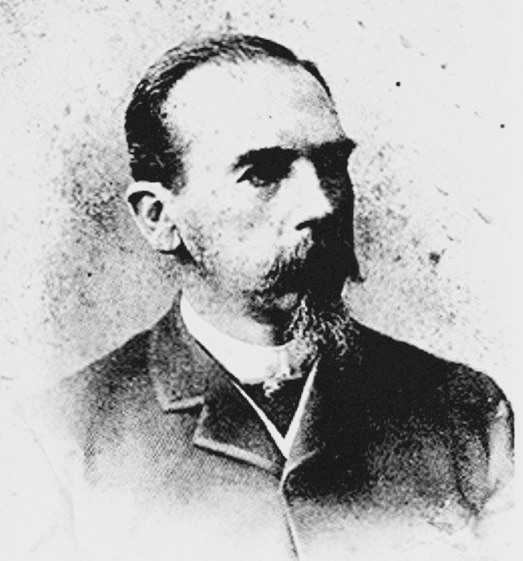

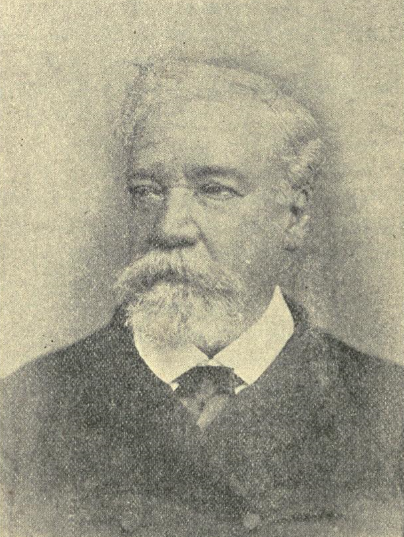
| Nominee | José Reina Barrios | Francisco Lainfiesta | Lorenzo Montúfar |
| Party | Liberal | Independent | Liberal |
| Home state | San Marcos | Guatemala City | Guatemala City |
| Percentage | 55% | 35% | 10% |
President before election
Manuel Barillas
Liberal
President-elect
José Reina Barrios
Liberal

Presidential elections were held in Guatemala in January 1892. The result was a victory for José María Reina Barrios.

== Background ==
Reyna Barrios finally made it back to Guatemala, in time to run for office in the 1892 presidential elections. It was the first election in Guatemala that allowed the candidates to make propaganda in the local newspapers. The candidates who ran for office were:

| Name | Party | Supported by: | Other information |
|---|---|---|---|
| Lorenzo Montúfar | Liberal | Liberal Club | He was the only one of all candidates who made an engraving of his portrait to publish it in the newspapers and was accused of wasting resources for doing this. |
| Francisco Lainfiesta | Liberal | None | Published his government proposal in the Diario de Centro America, taking advantage of the freedom of the Press that existed during Barillas' government. |
| José María Reyna Barrios | Liberal | Liberal Club | Eventual winner. |
| Miguel Enríquez | Conservative | Conservative Party | Enríquez had been a liberal, but became a conservative after the persecution that he suffered from the Barillas administration. |
| José Carranza Llerena | Conservative | None | Medical Staff of President Barillas. |

Barillas Bercian was unique among all liberal presidents of Guatemala between 1871 and 1944: he handed over power to his successor peacefully. When election time approached, he sent for the three Liberal candidates to ask them what their government plan would be. The following anecdote recounts better what happened then:

First arrived lawyer Francisco Lainfiesta, and General Barillas, with the friendliest of smiles, said: "Mr. Lainfiesta: you are one of the candidates in the upcoming elections and perhaps the more likely to win. Therefore, I would like to know what your attitude and your political system of government will be, if you get to win. Especially, I would like to know your attitude about my person; because I have made my mistakes, I do not deny it. I was a simple worker at my carpentry when General Justo Rufino Barrios sent for me to be appointed second presidential designate. I would therefore, Mr. Lainfiesta, know what conduct you will observe towards me." Mr. Lainfiesta said: "General Barillas: if luck would favor me with the election victory, my government will be based on strict adherence to the Constitution; the law would be the law and anyone who has acquired some responsibility, will have to answer for it before the relevant courts. A firm and righteous compliance with the constitutional provisions shall be the standard of my conduct as president". "Very well" said general Barillas, and both parted cordially.

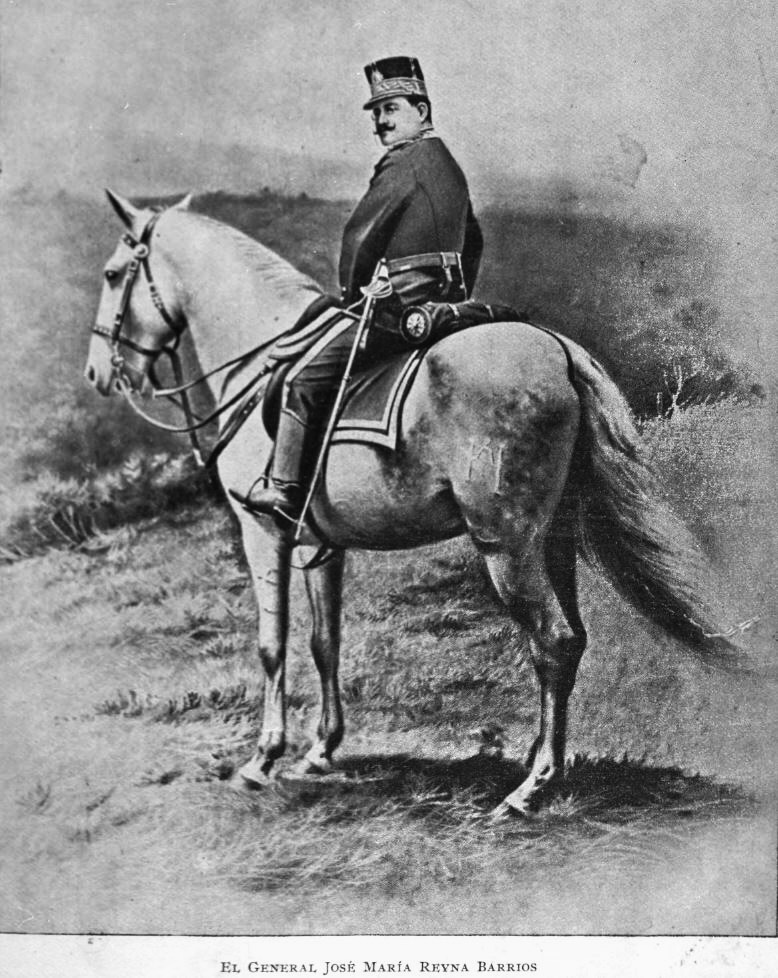
First instant photograph ever made in Guatemala. It shows general Reyna Barrios during military exercise in Guatemala City in 1896.

Barillas then brought in Dr. Montúfar and interrogated him in the same or similar way as he had done Mr. Lainfiesta. Dr. Montúfar responded in similar terms as Lainfiesta, stressing his claims to obedience of the Constitution and strict enforcement.

Finally general Reyna Barrios came in; when in the midst of pleasant conversation, General Barillas repeated his question, and Reyna replied, with a sincere smile: "We should not even talk about that, general; because you and I are the same. Rest assured that I will know how to respect and protect you." And then both shook hands with effusion. By the election period, the first two days of voting favored Lainfiesta. But by the third day, a huge column of Quetzaltenango and Totonicapán Indigenous people came down from the mountains to vote for general Reyna Barrios. The official agents did their job: Reyna was elected president and, not to offend the losing candidates, Barillas gave them checks to cover the costs of their presidential campaigns. Reyna Barrios, of course, received nothing, but he went on to become President on March 15, 1892.

== Results ==
| Candidate | Party | Votes | % |
|---|---|---|---|
| José María Reina Barrios | Liberal Party | | 55 |
| Francisco Lainfiesta | Nonpartisan | | 35 |
| Lorenzo Montúfar y Rivera | Liberal Party | | 10 |
| Miguel Enríquez | Conservative Party | | 0 |
| José Llerena Carranza | Conservative Party | | 0 |
| Invalid/blank votes | | | – |
| Total | | | 100 |

== Bibliography ==
- Villagrán Kramer, Francisco. Biografía política de Guatemala: años de guerra y años de paz. FLACSO-Guatemala, 2004.
- González Davison, Fernando. El régimen Liberal en Guatemala (1871–1944). Guatemala: Universidad de San Carlos de Guatemala. 1987.
- Dosal, Paul J. Power in transition: the rise of Guatemala's industrial oligarchy, 1871-1994. Westport: Praeger. 1995.
- Holden, Robert H. Armies without nations: public violence and state formation in Central America, 1821-1960. New York: Oxford University Press. 2004.
- LaCharité, Norman A., Richard O. Kennedy, and Phillip M. Thienel. Case study in insurgency and revolutionary warfare: Guatemala, 1944-1954. Washington, D.C.: Special Operations Research Office, American University. 1964.
- Luján Muñoz, Jorge. Las revoluciones de 1897, la muerte de J.M. Reina Barrios y la elección de M. Estrada Cabrera. Guatemala: Artemis Edinter. 2003.
- Taracena Arriola, Arturo. "Liberalismo y poder político en Centroamérica (1870-1929)." Historia general de Centroamérica. 1994. San José: FLACSO. Volume 4.
