= August 1920 Guatemalan presidential election =

- 27 August 1920
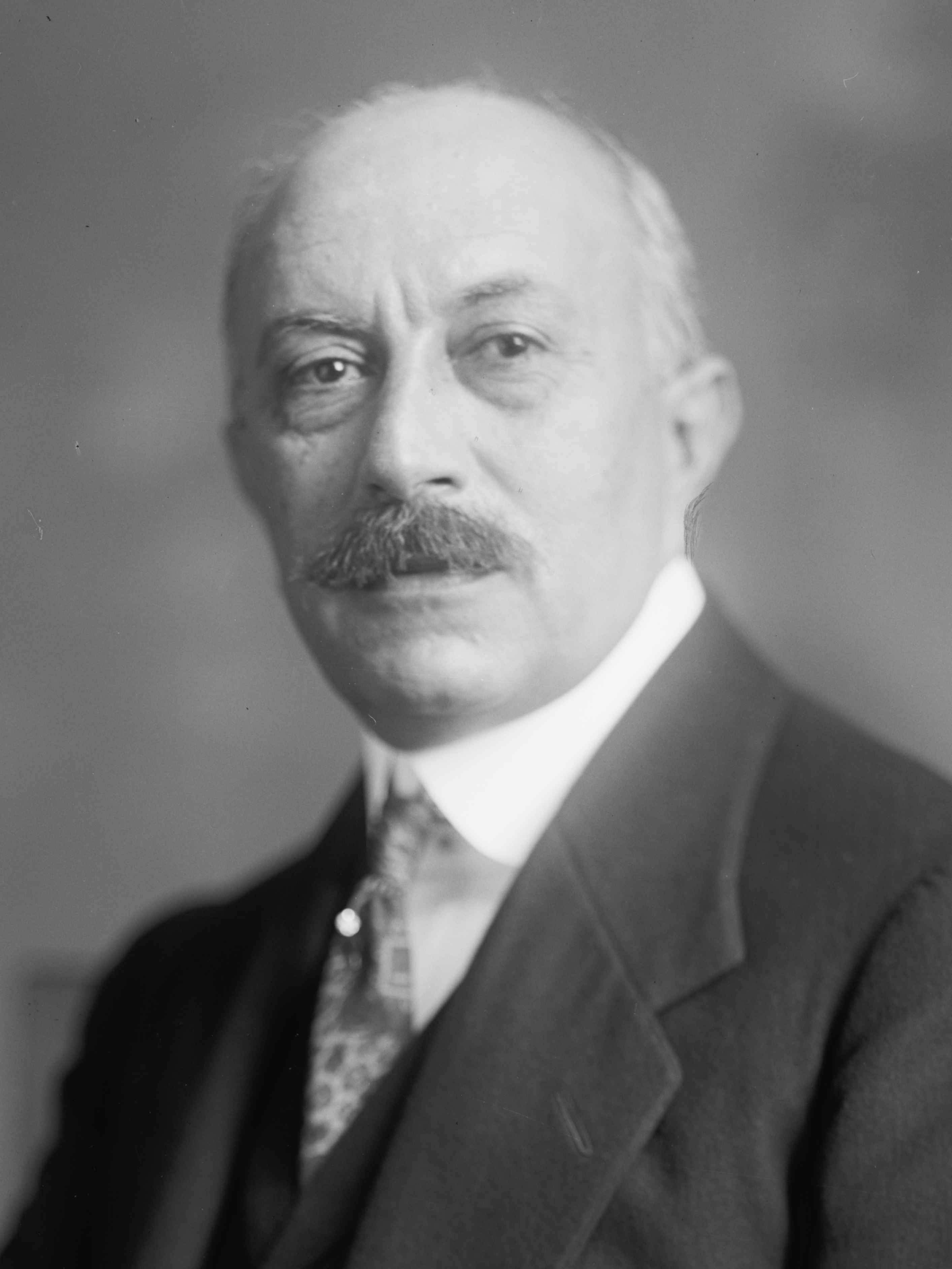

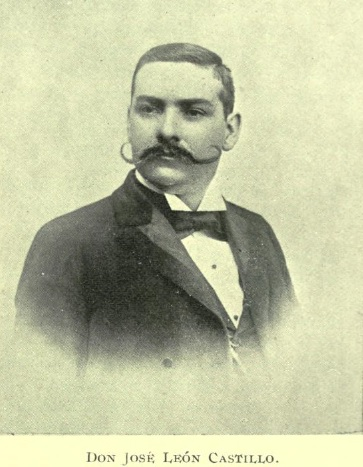
Nominee	Carlos Herrera	José León Castillo
Party	PU–PD	Republican
Popular vote	246,976	7,948
Percentage	94.59%	3.04%
President before election
Carlos Herrera
PU–PD
President-elect
Carlos Herrera
PU–PD

Presidential elections were held in Guatemala on 27 August 1920. The result was a victory for Carlos Herrera, who received 95% of the vote.

== Results ==
Candidate	Party	Votes	%
Carlos Herrera	Unionist Party–Democratic Party	246,976	94.59
José León Castillo	Republican Party	7,948	3.04
Francisco Fuentes	West Republican Party–Constitutionalist Liberal Party	5,983	2.29
53 other candidates		204	0.08
Total		261,111	100.00
Source: Moore, Lloyd Jones

== Bibliography ==
- Caida de una tiranía. Páginas de la historia de Centro América. Guatemala: Impreso en los Talleres Sánchez. Moore, Clement Henry. 1965.
- Campang Chang, José. El estado y los partidos políticos en Guatemala. 1944–1951. Guatemala: Universidad de San Carlos. 1992.
- Díaz Romeu, Guillermo. “ Del régimen de Carlos Herrera a la elección de Jorge Ubico.” Historia general de Guatemala. 1993–1999. Guatemala: Asociación de Amigos del País, Fundación para la Cultura y el Desarrollo. Volume 5. 1996.
- Grandin, Greg. The last colonial massacre: Latin America in the Cold War. Chicago: University of Chicago Press. 2004.
- Jones, Chester Lloyd. Guatemala, past and present. New York: Russell and Russell. (Reprint of 1940 edition). 1966.
