= 1925 Guatemalan parliamentary election =

Parliamentary elections were held in Guatemala in December 1925. The result was a victory for the Liberal Party, which won all 69 seats. The party faced serious opposition in only fifteen constituencies. In Guatemala City the Liberal received 3,289 votes, the Progressive Liberal Party 506 and the Conservative Party 178. The PLP claimed that they had won 90% of the vote, but that the Liberal government had discounted votes against them.

== Background ==
The elections were the first major test for the Progressive Liberal Party, who put forward candidates in every constituency. However, the Conservative Party did not put forward any candidates.

== Results ==
Party	Seats	+/–
Liberal Party	69	0
Progressive Liberal Party	0	0
Conservative Party	0	0
Total	69	0

== Bibliography ==
- Political Handbook of the world, 1928. New York, 1929.
