= 1927 Guatemalan Constitutional Convention election =

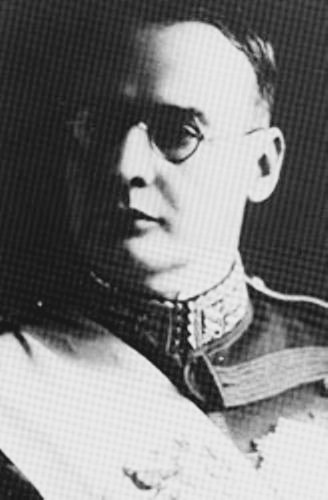
President Lázaro Chacón, 1926

Constitutional Convention elections were held in Guatemala in June 1927. Lázaro Chacón González put 33 senior officers on the official list of candidates, and whilst civilian leaders of the Liberal Party were also on it, the fact that most of them were members of the armed forces suggested that González was determined to dominate the convention.

== Bibliography ==
- García Laguardia, Jorge Mario. “Evolución político-constitucional de la República de Guatemala en el siglo XX: 1920-1986.” La constitución mexicana 70 años después. 1988. México: UNAM. 1988.
- Jiménez, Ernesto Bienvenido. Ellos los presidentes. Guatemala: Editorial José de Pineda Ibarra. 1981.
- Political handbook of the world 1928. New York, 1929.
