= 1898 Guatemalan presidential election =

- September 1898
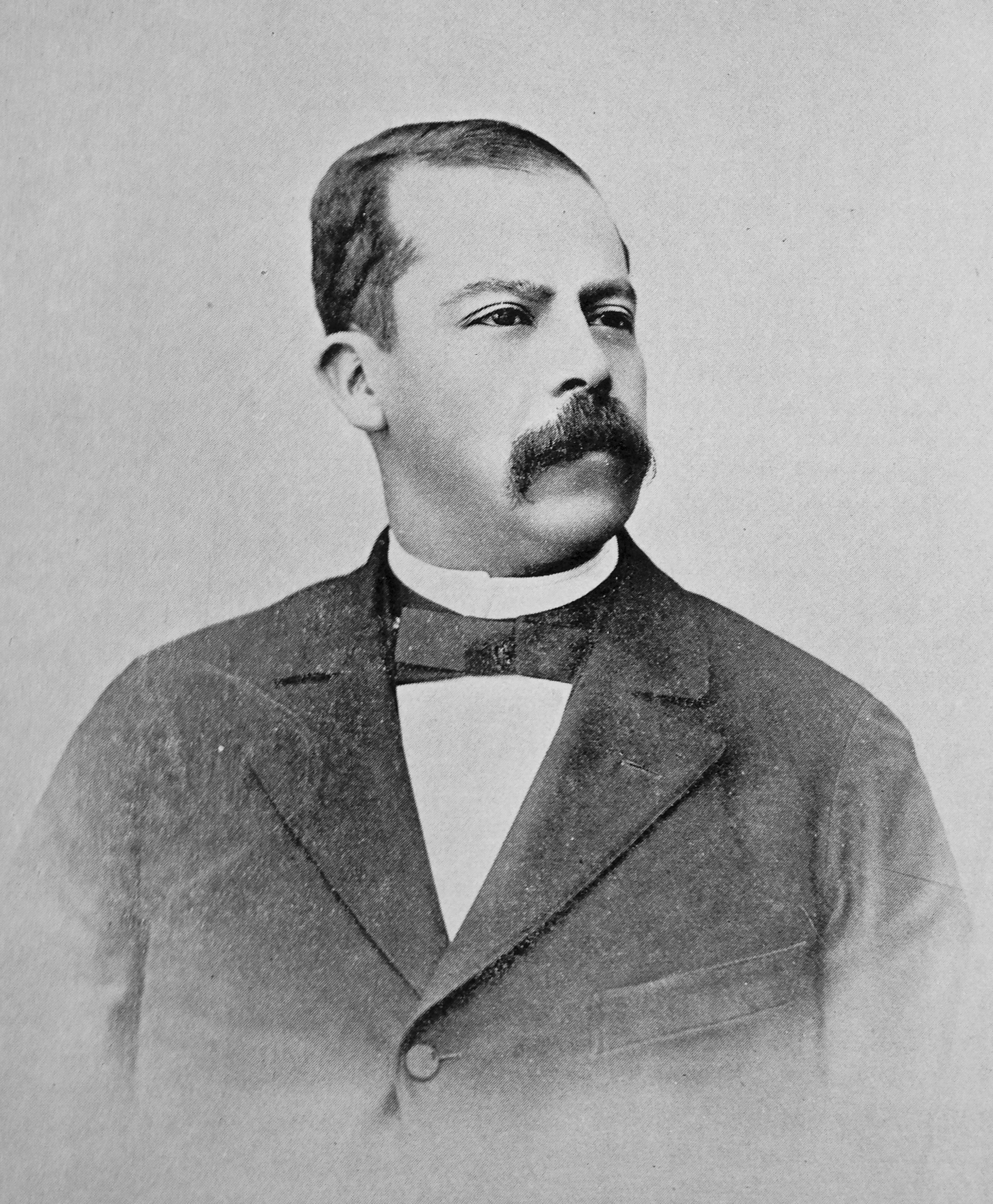

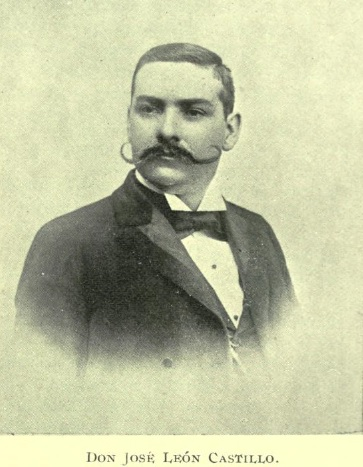
| Nominee | Manuel Estrada Cabrera | José León Castillo |
| Party | Liberal | Liberal |
| Home state | Quetzaltenango | Guatemala |
| Popular vote | 312,797 | 672 |
| Percentage | 99.79% | 0.21% |
President before election
Manuel Estrada Cabrera
Liberal
President-elect
Manuel Estrada Cabrera
Liberal

Presidential elections were held in Guatemala during seven days in September 1898. Prior to the elections Manuel Estrada Cabrera had established the first real political party in the country's history by admitting people from outside the influential liberals to the Liberal Party.

The elections were regarded as fraudulent; constitutional guarantees had been suspended for a month and opposition candidate José León Castillo had been unable to campaign. Estrada was declared the winner with 99.8% of the vote, although the number of votes cast is estimated to have been at least three times the number of people eligible to vote at the time. Legislative Assembly Decree 413 of 26 September declared that Estrada's term of office would begin on 15 March 1899, but he assumed the presidency on 2 October.

== Results ==
| Candidate | Party | Votes | % |
|---|---|---|---|
| Manuel Estrada Cabrera | Liberal Party | 312,797 | 99.79 |
| José León Castillo | Liberal Party | 672 | 0.21 |
| Total | | 313,469 | 100.00 |
Source: Luján Muñoz

== Bibliography ==
- Villagrán Kramer, Francisco. Biografía política de Guatemala: años de guerra y años de paz. FLACSO-Guatemala, 2004.
- González Davison, Fernando. El régimen Liberal en Guatemala (1871–1944). Guatemala: Universidad de San Carlos de Guatemala. 1987.
- Dosal, Paul J. Power in transition: the rise of Guatemala's industrial oligarchy, 1871-1994. Westport: Praeger. 1995.
- LaCharité, Norman A., Richard O. Kennedy, and Phillip M. Thienel. Case study in insurgency and revolutionary warfare: Guatemala, 1944-1954. Washington, D.C.: Special Operations Research Office, American University. 1964.
- Taracena Arriola, Arturo. "Liberalismo y poder político en Centroamérica (1870-1929)." Historia general de Centroamérica. 1994. San José: FLACSO. Volume 4.
