= 1921 Guatemalan presidential election =

- 15 December 1921
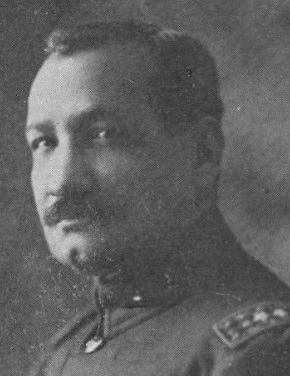
Nominee	José María Orellana
Party	Liberal
Percentage	100%
Head of State before election
Lima, Orellana, Larrave
Liberal
Elected Head of State
José María Orellana
Liberal

Presidential elections were held in Guatemala on 15 December 1921.

On the evening of 5 December 1921 a group of senior army officers entered the residence of the President Carlos Herrera y Luna and demanded his resignation. He left power in the hands of a military triumvirate. The new junta was made up of Generals José María Lima, José María Orellana and Miguel Larrave.

“Within hours after the cuartelazo, the triumvirate declared that the incumbent Congress had been seated illegally and that, therefore, all of the Assembly’s legislation, including the promulgation of the Constitution, had no legal basis. The pre-1921 Constitution and the Assembly that existed at the time of Cabrera’s fall were reinstated; and Herrera’s First Designate, José Ernesto Zelaya, was disqualified from succeeding to the presidency”.

The Congress elected the provisional president of the general José María Orellana (Liberal Party) on 15 December 1921.

"The coup was clearly a victory for the old Liberal guard that had been loyal to Estrada Cabrera. Orellana was a personal favorite and protégé of Estrada Cabrera. ... Although it is unlikely that American interests initiated the coup, the United States assisted Orellana’s efforts to consolidate power".
