= 1944 Guatemalan parliamentary by-election =

By-elections to fill vacancies in the Congress were held in Guatemala on 13 October 1944. Congressional elections were blatantly manipulated to insure the election of government candidates. Following the example of former president Ubico, president Ponce Vaides rigged the congressional elections in October 1944, in which the official slate won 48,530 votes out of a total of 44,571 ballots. The ruling Progressive Liberal Party's candidates easily captured the five congressional seats available.

On 20 October 1944, young military officers deposed President Ponce in a lightning-quick coup. The junta immediately dissolved the legislature and set dates for three elections: congressional, 3–5 November; presidential, 17–19 December; and, constituent assembly, 28–30 December.
