= 1922 Guatemalan presidential election =

- 22 February 1922
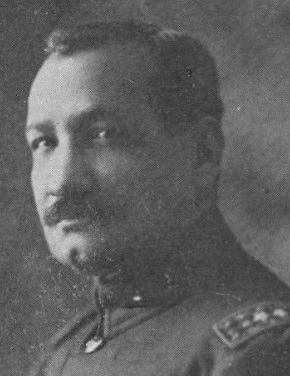

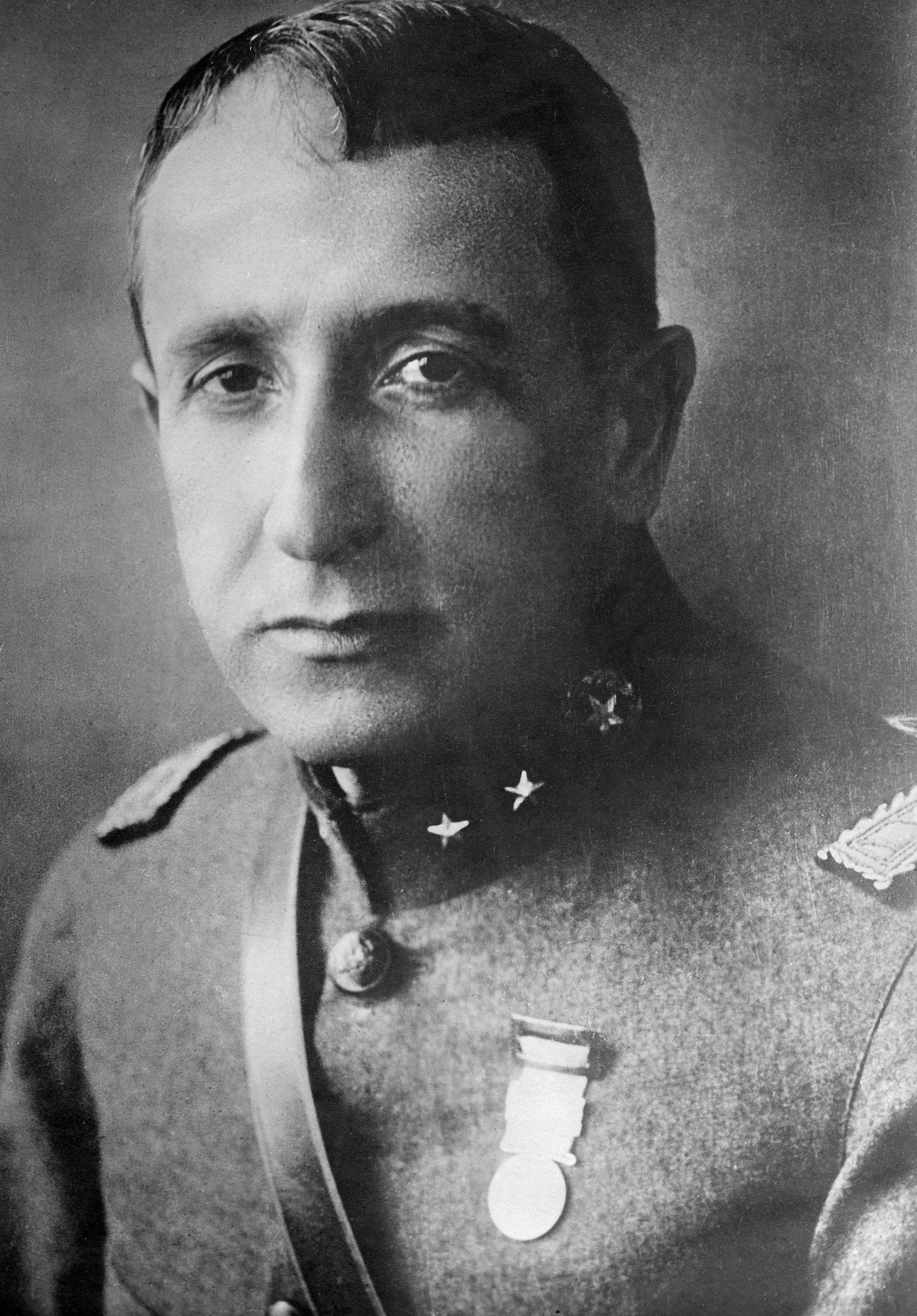
Nominee	José María Orellana	Jorge Ubico
Party	Liberal	Progressive Liberal
Home state	El Progreso	Guatemala City
Percentage	95%	5%
President before election
José María Orellana
Liberal
President-elect
José María Orellana
Liberal

Presidential elections were held in Guatemala on 22 February 1922. The result was a victory for José María Orellana, although the military had controlled the election and silenced the opposition, as well as putting down rebellions in at least twelve places including Antigua. Orellana assumed the presidency on 4 March.

== Results ==
Candidate	Party	Votes	%
José María Orellana	Liberal Party		95
Jorge Ubico	Progressive Liberal Party		5
Total			

== Bibliography ==
- Díaz Romeu, Guillermo. “ Del régimen de Carlos Herrera a la elección de Jorge Ubico.” Historia general de Guatemala. 1993-1999. Guatemala: Asociación de Amigos del País, Fundación para la Cultura y el Desarrollo. Volume 5. 1996.
