= Socialist Workers Unification =

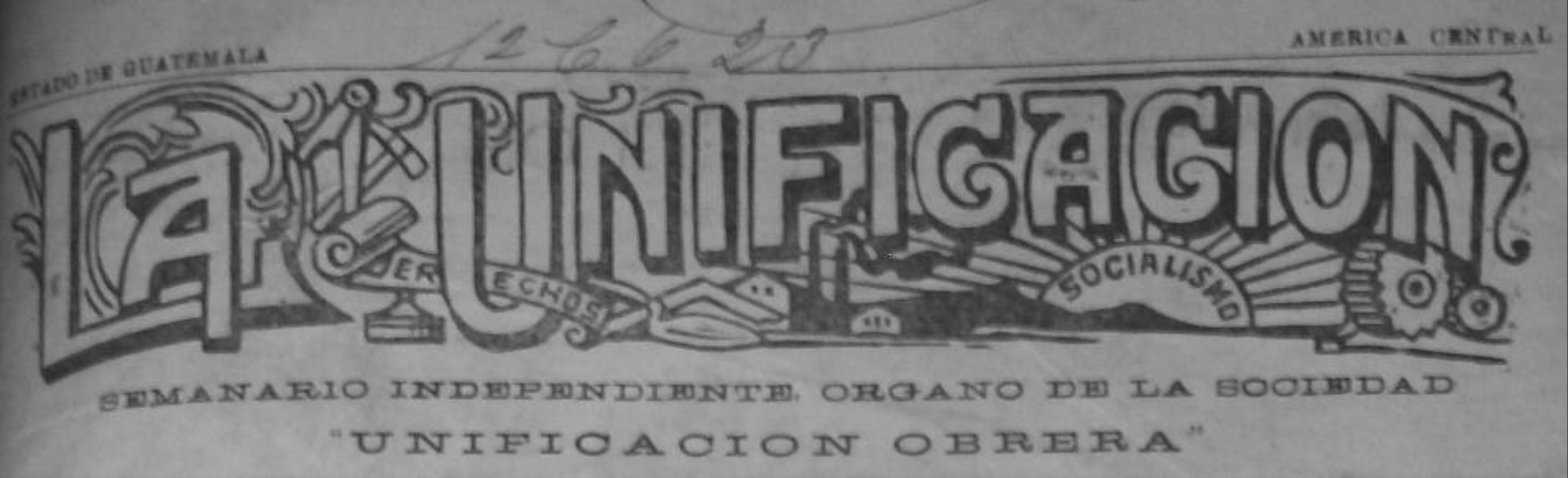
La Unifiación, the weekly newspaper of the UOS

Socialist Workers Unification (in Spanish: Unificación Obrera Socialista) was a socialist group in Guatemala. The group emerged in 1921. Initially, it used the name Workers Unification (Unificación Obrera). In that year, it organized the first May Day rally in the country.

Some sources claim that the founders of the group were Antonio Obando Sánchez, Alfredo Pellecer and Miguel Mármol. However, this is not confirmed.

After the 1922 coup d'etat of president Orellana, the group was banned. In the same year, the leftist section of the group established the Communist Party of Guatemala.
