= The United States and Right-wing Dictatorships, 1965–1989 =

- Author: David F. Schmitz
- Language: English
- Subject: US Foreign policy
- Publisher: Cambridge University Press
- Publication date: March 20, 2006
- Pages: 272
- ISBN: 0521678536
- Preceded by: Thank God they're on our side: the United States and Right-wing Dictatorships, 1921-1965

The United States and Right-wing Dictatorships, 1965–1989 is a 2006 book by David F. Schmitz. In the United Kingdom it was published by Cambridge University Press.
