= Progressive Liberal Party (Guatemala) =

Political party in Guatemala

Progressive Liberal Party Partido Liberal Progresista
- Leader: Jorge Ubico Castañeda (1922–1944); Federico Ponce Vaides (1944)
- Founded: 1922
- Legalised: 1925
- Dissolved: 1944
- Split from: Liberal Party
- Headquarters: Guatemala City
- Ideology: Ubicoism; Economic liberalism Liberalism; Nationalism; Anti-communism; Fascism; Federalism
- Political position: Far-right

The Progressive Liberal Party was a political party in Guatemala. It had a nationalistic and liberal ideology. It was founded in 1922, and dissolved in 1944.

The party, led by Jorge Ubico won the 1931 general election unopposed.

The party's members included those who were complicit during the dictatorship of Manuel Estrada Cabrera as well as prominent members Guatemala's intellectual youth and of Guatemalan society. When Ubico first assumed power in 1931, the PLP adopted a program that called for, among other things: reform of political institutions, a solution to economic problems resulting from industrialization, and complete reformation of the education system. At least up until 1932, the PLP did not formally exist as a proper political party, but rather of a series of clubs across the country. Indigenous peoples in Guatemala were heavily persecuted under Ubico's rule, despite the party's claim that many social systems were implemented to assist this population; although support among indigenous peoples of the era is complex, as some used Ubico's expanded bureaucracy to express personal grievances in the hopes of preventing local abuses. Because the PLP effectively served as a vehicle for the Ubico dictatorship, many political parties founded after the ouster of the dictatorship in the Guatemalan Revolution refused to adopt the word "party" in their names.

== Electoral history ==
=== Presidential elections ===
Election	Candidate	Votes	%	Result
1922	Jorge Ubico		5%	Lost ✗
1926	Jorge Ubico	36,940	11.39%	Lost ✗
1931	Jorge Ubico	305,841	100%	Elected ✓

=== Legislative Assembly elections ===
Election	Votes	%	Position	Seats	+/–	Status in legislature
1923		0%	2nd	0 / 69	0	Opposition
1925	506	12.73%	2nd	0 / 69	0	Opposition
1926	36,940	11.39%	2nd	5 / 69	▲5	Opposition
1927		0%	2nd	0 / 69	▼5	Opposition
1929		15.28%	2nd	6 / 69	▲6	Opposition
1931	305,841	100%	▲1st	69 / 69	▲63	Government
1935		100%	1st	69 / 69	0	Government
1944	44,571	91.84%	1st	5 / 5	▼64	Government

== Presidents of Guatemala ==
No.	President		Term start	Term end	Term length	Vice President
1 (21)	Jorge Ubico	Jorge Ubico (1878–1946)	14 February 1931	1 July 1944	13 years, 138 days	Vacant
2 (–)	Juan Federico Ponce Vaides	Juan Federico Ponce Vaides (1889–1956)	1 July 1944	20 October 1944	111 days	Vacant
