= David F. Schmitz =

American historian

David F. Schmitz (born September 4, 1956) holds the Robert Allen Skotheim Chair of History at Whitman College. He specializes in 20th Century United States history, especially United States Foreign Policy. In 2022, Schmitz received the Quantrell Award.

He received a PhD, from Rutgers University in 1985, with a thesis "United States foreign policy toward fascist Italy, 1922-1940".

== Bibliography ==
- The United States and Right-wing Dictatorships, 1965-1989, New York: Cambridge University Press, 2006. ISBN 9780521678537. According to WorldCat, the book is held in 530 libraries
- Brent Scowcroft: internationalism and post-Vietnam War American foreign policy, Lanham, Md.: Rowman & Littlefield, ©2011. ISBN 9780742570405
- The triumph of internationalism: Franklin D. Roosevelt and a world in crisis, 1933-1941, Washington, D.C. : Potomac Books, 2007. ISBN 9781574889307
- The Tet Offensive : Politics, war, and public opinion, Lanham: Rowman & Littlefield, 2005. ISBN 9780742544864 According to WorldCat, the book is held in 427 libraries
- Henry L. Stimson: the first wise man, Wilmington, Del.: SR Books, 2001. ISBN 9780842026321
- (co-edited with T. Christopher Jespersen) Architects of the American century: individuals and institutions in twentieth-century U.S. foreign policymaking, Chicago: Imprint, 2000. ISBN 9781879176355
- Thank God they're on our side: the United States and Right-wing Dictatorships, 1921-1965, Chapel Hill: University of North Carolina Press, 1999. ISBN 9780807847732. According to WorldCat, the book is held in 462 libraries
- (co-edited, with Richard D. Challener) Appeasement in Europe: a reassessment of U.S. policies, New York: Greenwood Press, 1990. ISBN 9780313259258
- The United States and fascist Italy, 1922-1940, Chapel Hill: University of North Carolina Press, 1988. ISBN 9780807817667
