= 1931 Guatemalan general election =

- 6–8 February 1931
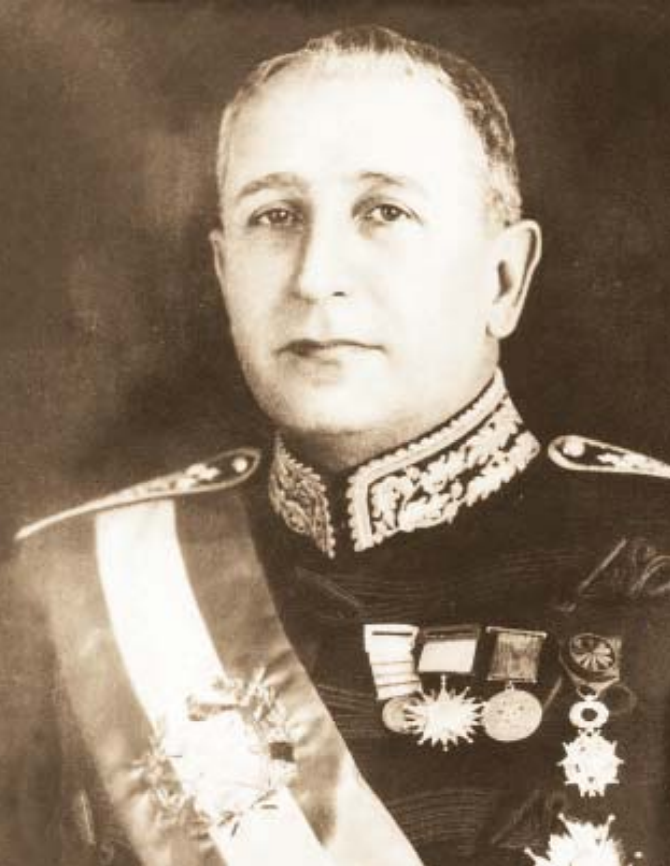
Nominee	Jorge Ubico
Party	PLP
Home state	Guatemala City
States carried	23
Popular vote	305,841
Percentage	100%
President before election
José Reina
President-elect
Jorge Ubico
PLP

General elections were held in Guatemala between 6 and 8 February 1931. In the presidential election Jorge Ubico was elected unopposed, after the remaining sector of the old Liberal Party did not object to his candidacy, whilst the Conservative Party was too disorganised and discredited from the Lázaro Chacón González era to put forward a candidate. Ubico's Progressive Liberal Party, formed by a union of the two wings of the divided Liberal Party also won the parliamentary election unopposed.

== Results ==
=== President ===
Candidate	Party	Votes	%
Jorge Ubico	Progressive Liberal Party	305,841	100.00
Total		305,841	100.00
Source: Nohlen

=== Congress ===
Party	Seats
Progressive Liberal Party	69
Total	69

== Bibliography ==
- Villagrán Kramer, Francisco. Biografía política de Guatemala: años de guerra y años de paz. FLACSO-Guatemala, 2004.
- Political handbook of the world 1933. New York, 1934.
- Dosal, Paul J. Power in transition: the rise of Guatemala's industrial oligarchy, 1871-1994. Westport: Praeger. 1995.
- Grieb, Kenneth J. “El gobierno de Jorge Ubico.” Historia general de Guatemala. 1993-1999. Guatemala: Asociación de Amigos del País, Fundación para la Cultura y el Desarrollo. Volume 5 pages 43–60. 1996.
- Jones, Chester Lloyd. Guatemala, past and present. New York: Russell and Russell. (Reprint of 1940 edition) 1966.
