= 1926 Guatemalan general election =

- 5 December 1926
- Presidential election

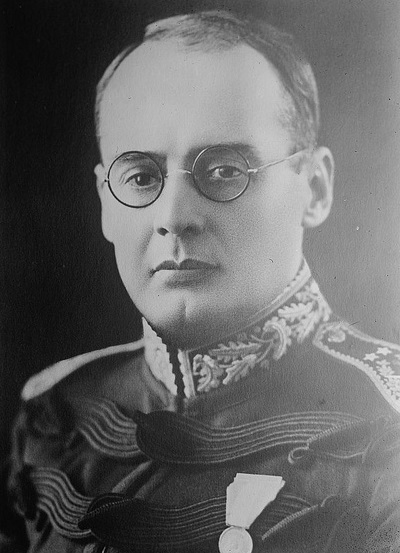

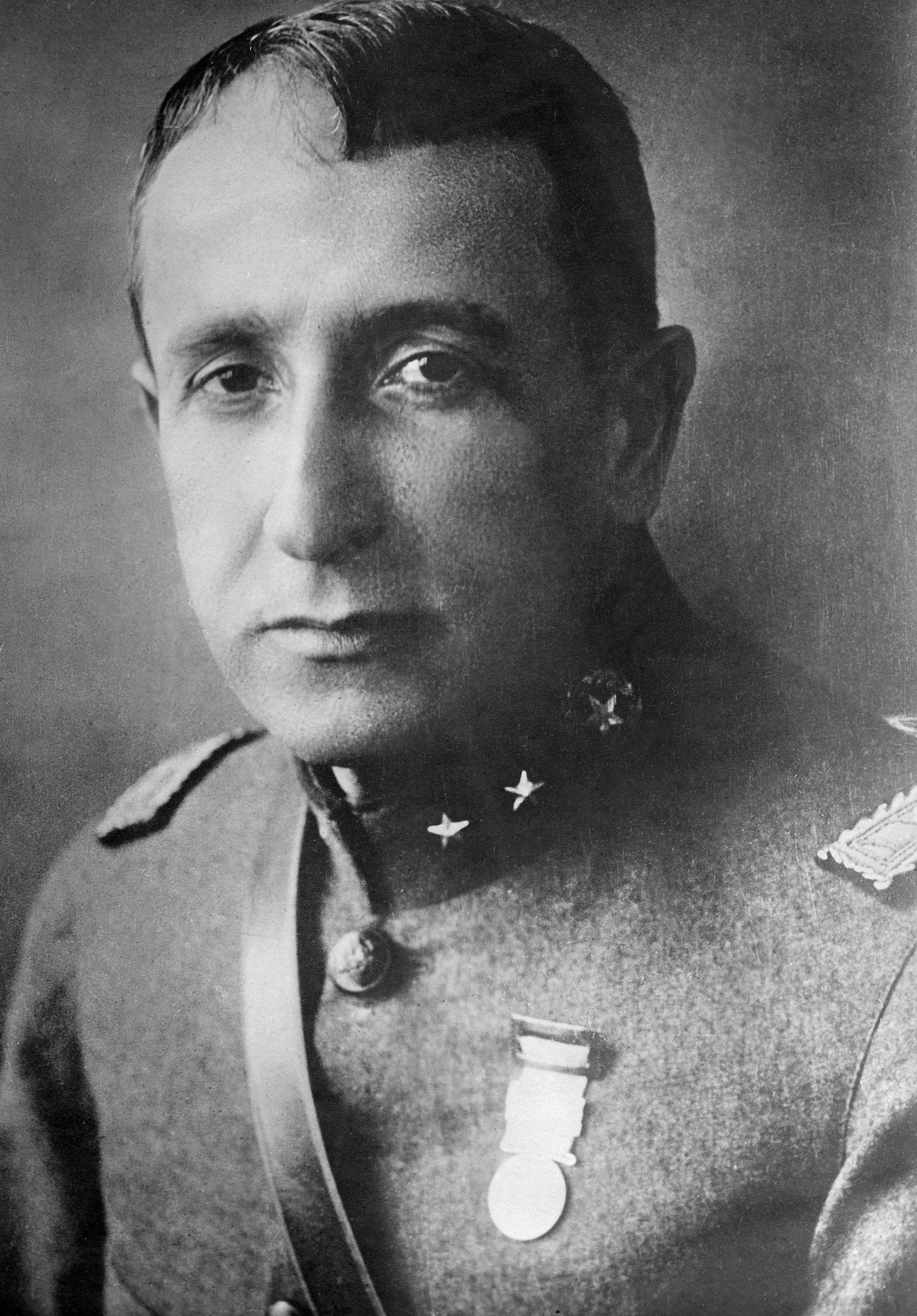
Nominee	Lázaro Chacón González	Jorge Ubico
Party	Unionist	Progressive Liberal
Popular vote	287,412	36,940
Percentage	88.61%	11.39%
President before election
Lázaro Chacón González
Unionist
President-elect
Lázaro Chacón González
Unionist

General elections were held in Guatemala on 5 December 1926. The presidential election resulted in a victory for Lázaro Chacón González, who received 89% of the vote. Whilst the elections were rigged, the Progressive Liberal Party did win some seats in the Congress.

== Results ==
=== President ===
Candidate	Party	Votes	%
Lázaro Chacón González	Unionist Party	287,412	88.61
Jorge Ubico	Progressive Liberal Party	36,940	11.39
Total		324,352	100.00
Source: Nohlen

== Bibliography ==
- Díaz Romeu, Guillermo. “ Del régimen de Carlos Herrera a la elección de Jorge Ubico.” Historia general de Guatemala. 1993-1999. Guatemala: Asociación de Amigos del País, Fundación para la Cultura y el Desarrollo. Volume 5. 1996.
- González Davison, Fernando. El régimen Liberal en Guatemala (1871-1944). Guatemala: Universidad de San Carlos de Guatemala. 1987.
- García Laguardia, Jorge Mario. “Evolución político-constitucional de la República de Guatemala en el siglo XX: 1920-1986.” La constitución mexicana 70 años después. 1988. México: UNAM. 1988.
- Jiménez, Ernesto Bienvenido. Ellos los presidentes. Guatemala: Editorial José de Pineda Ibarra. 1981.
- Pitti, Joseph A. Jorge Ubico and Guatemalan politics in the 1920s. Albuquerque: University of New Mexico. Unpublished dissertation. 1975.
- Political handbook of the world 1928. New York, 1929.
- Taplin, Glen W. Middle American governors. Metuchen: Scarecrow Press. 1972.
