= Conservative Party (Guatemala) =

Conservative Party Partido Conservador
- Founded: 1820
- Dissolved: 1930s
- Merged into: Unionist Party (faction)
- Ideology: Conservatism; Social conservatism; Protectionism faction: Authoritarianism Caudilloism
- Political position: Center-right to right-wing and far-right (factions)

The Conservative Party (Spanish: Partido Conservador, PC) was one of the two major political parties in Guatemala during the nineteenth and early twentieth century. The Conservative Party originated in the Serviles political group—consisting primarily of merchants and estate owners—representing a strong central government and a continuation of the colonial-era privileges. The Conservatives sought to preserve the power and privileges of the Catholic Church, as well as several of the existing monopolies—particularly the tobacco monopoly and the consulado. The Conservative Party consolidated much of their power between 1839 - 1871, mostly during the period under President Rafael Carrera.

== History ==
During the reign of Captain-General José de Bustamante (1810 - 1817), political struggles resulted in two discernible factions: Conservatives (Serviles) and Liberals (Liberales). Nicknamed bacos (drunkards) by their Liberal opponents, the Conservatives consisted of estate owners, the Catholic Church, and the monopolistic merchant clique. Opposed to social and economic change, the Conservatives sought to preserve the privileges of the church and the colonial-era commercial monopolies.

Although the Liberals had advocated for independence from its inception as a political group, Conservatives were initially opposed to breaking away from the Spanish Empire, seeing independence as a threat to their privilege. By 1821, though, the Conservatives had accepted the need for independence due to the tumultuous situation in Spain. In September 1821, Captain-General of Guatemala, Gabino Gaínza, declared the independence of Central America from the Spanish Empire.

Guatemala, under significant influence from the Conservative Aycienca family and José Cecilio del Valle, pledged allegiance to the Mexican Empire—drawing significant ire from Liberals. Soon afterwards, an armed rebellion occurred in El Salvador, led by Liberal Manuel José Arce. Seeing the Mexican Empire quickly unravelling, the Central American Congress declared full independence in 1823.

Two years later, in 1825, Acre won the first Central American federal election, narrowly defeating Conservative Cecilio del Valle. Cecilio del Valle would contest the following elections, both in 1830 and 1834, and won the 1834 federal election, defeating Liberal Francisco Morazán. However, before he could assume the Presidency, Cecilio del Valle died due to an unexpected illness; elections were called for the following year. Without any serious opposition, Francisco Morazán handily won the election. This election, though, would be the last Central American election—the federation collapsed only a few years later.

The Liberals continued to dominate Guatemala following the country’s departure from the federation. They pursued policies that were seen by the indigenous population as an attack on their way of life, causing significant unrest in the countryside; by 1838 the countryside was in full revolt. Eventually, the various villages consolidated their forces under caudillo Rafael Carrera. The Mariano Gálvez government, seeing increasing opposition from both radical Liberal and peasant factions, was overthrown on February 1, 1838 when Carrera’s peasant army marched on Guatemala City.

The makeshift alliance between Carrera and the radical Liberals soon collapsed. Carrera’s demands regarding the protection of village autonomy and church power were repeatedly ignored. Conservatives, seeing the radical Liberals as impossible to cooperate with, did not oppose Carrera’s army after he again marched on Guatemala City in 1839.

Following Carrera’s second revolt, the Conservative Rivera Paz assumed the Presidency, albeit under significant influence from Carrera. In 1844, Carrera dissolved the constituent assembly and assumed the presidency. He retained that position (except for a brief period in 1850) until his death in 1865. Under Carrera, the Conservatives reinstituted various trade monopolies, rigorously opposed British colonization, and brought back laws allowing forced labor.

After Carrera's death, the party struggled to maintain the dictatorial power held under Carrera. Six years after Carrera’s death, in 1871, a Liberal revolt led by Justo Rufino Barrios overthrew the Conservative government of Vicente Cerna. The Liberals remained in power until the 1920s; their economic policies during this time (1871 - 1926) gained the support of many Conservatives.

Excluding a brief failed counter-revolution in 1875, the Conservative Party failed to retain its former relevance in Guatemalan politics. The Conservatives fielded candidates in the 1892 and 1898 elections, but failed to gain a significant number of votes. In 1921, following the overthrow of Estrada Cabrera, many remaining Conservative politicians entered into a coalition with anti-Cabrera Liberals, forming the Unionist Party.

== Electoral history ==
=== Presidential elections ===
Election	Candidate(s)	Votes	%	Result
1825	José Cecilio del Valle	—	—	Lost
1830	José Cecilio del Valle	—	—	Lost
1834	José Cecilio del Valle	—	—	Won
1892	Miguel Enríquez José Carranza Llerena	—	0% 0%	Lost
1898	José Carranza Llerena	—	—	Lost
