= Carlos Herrera =

Guatemalan President (1856–1930)

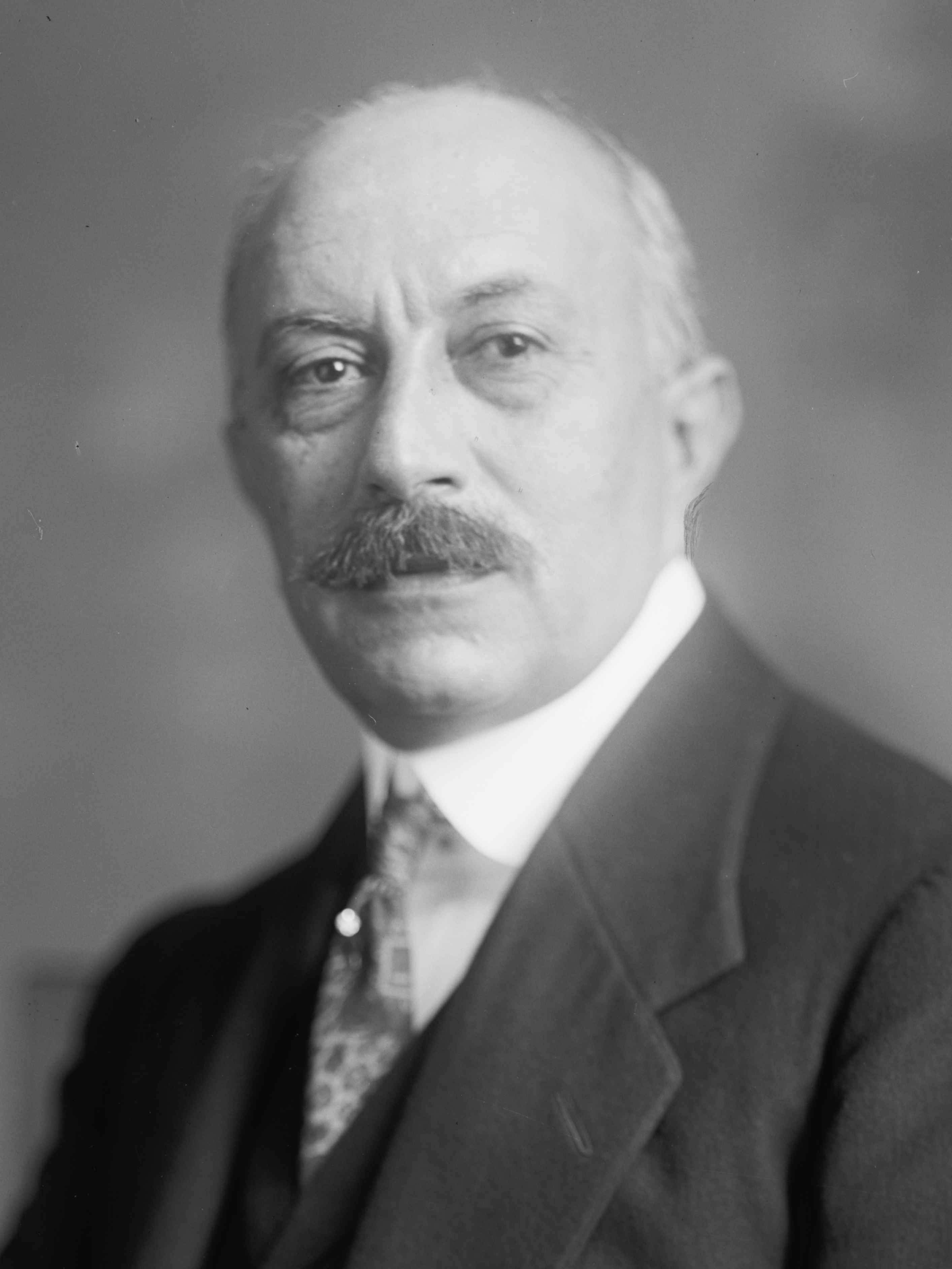
- Herrera in 1920

President of Guatemala
- In office 30 March 1920 – 10 December 1921
- Preceded by: Manuel Estrada Cabrera
- Succeeded by: José María Orellana

Guatemalan Parliament Representative
- In office 1899–1920

Personal details
- Born: Carlos Herrera y Luna; 26 October 1856 Guatemala
- Died: 3 July 1930 (aged 73) Paris, France
- Party: Unionist (1920-1921); Liberal (1898–1920)
- Profession: Businessman
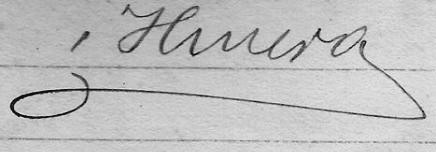
- Signature

Carlos Herrera y Luna (26 October 1856 – 3 July 1930) was a Guatemalan politician who served as acting President of Guatemala from 30 March 1920 to 15 September 1920, and President of Guatemala from 16 September 1920 until 10 December 1921.

== Business career ==
Herrera Luna was a successful sugar business man, developing Pantaleón Sugar Mill in Santa Lucía Cotzumalguapa, and Concepción and El Baúl sugar mills in Escuintla in the early 1900s. Pantaleón Sugar Holdings is today one of the top 10 sugar companies in America, with mills in Central and South America.

== Presidency ==
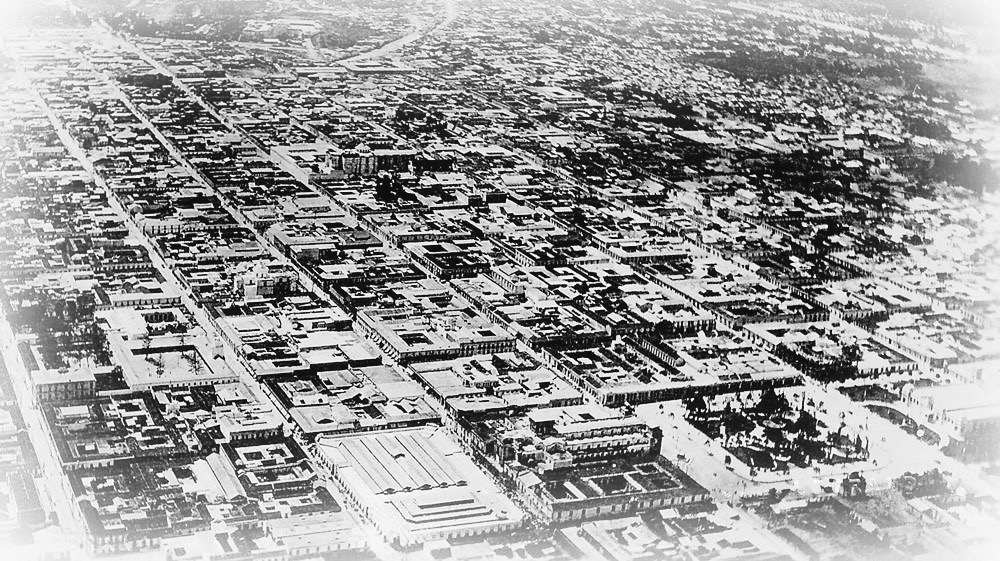

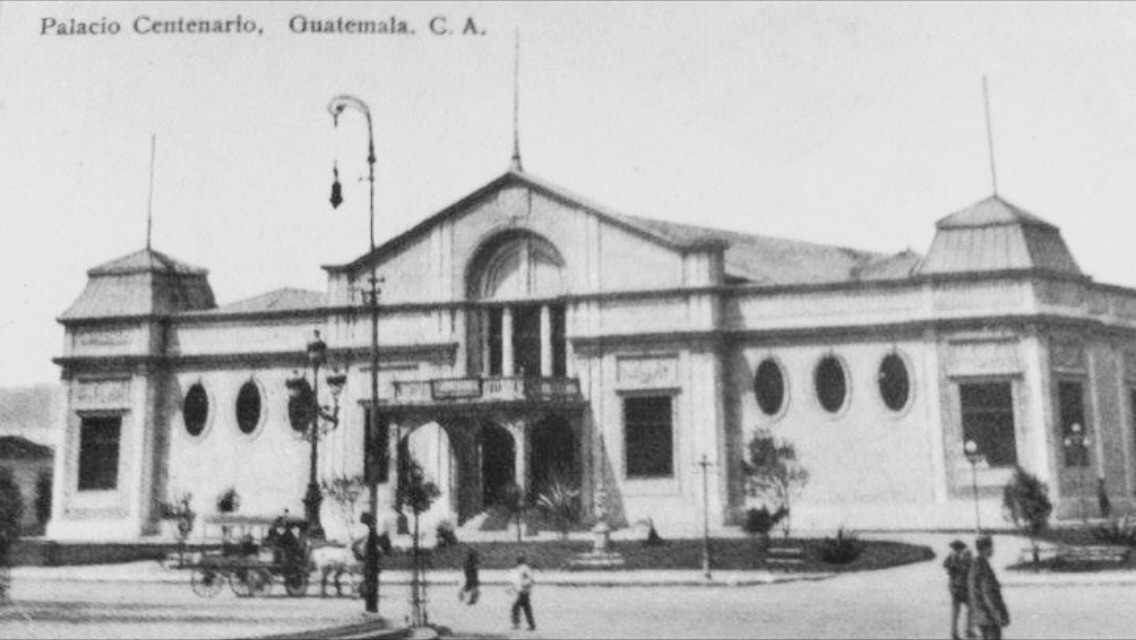
"Palacio del Centenario" (Centennial Palace). Built in 1921 by Herrera administration to celebrate the first centennial of the Independence. It was located where the Royal Palace used to be, before it was destroyed by the 1917 Guatemala earthquake. The Centennial Palace was made of wood and therefore the Guatemalans called it the "Cardboard palace". It got destroyed in a fire a few years later.

After Manuel Estrada Cabrera was overthrown on April 14, 1920, the Unionist Party leaders, who were mostly conservatives, dealt with the liberal leaders from the Estrada Cabrera's regime such that they could appoint the new cabinet. However, the liberal leaders outsmarted the conservatives and appoint Herrera Luna in office, in spite that he had served as a liberal representative for the whole 22 years that Estrada Cabrera's government lasted; furthermore, they also appointed several key members of the ousted government in the new administration. Under these circumstances, the deals that Estrada Cabrera had set with the United Fruit Company were sure to hold. However, as an experienced business man, Herrera Luna realized that all of those concessions granted too much power to UFCO without any real benefit for Guatemala in return and did not accept them.

=== Education ===
Herrera Luna granted several benefits to the National University after its valuable contributions to the revolution against Estrada Cabrera's regime:

- Autonomy to elect authorities
- A house for the students to assemble and create their Student Body.

=== Coup d'état ===
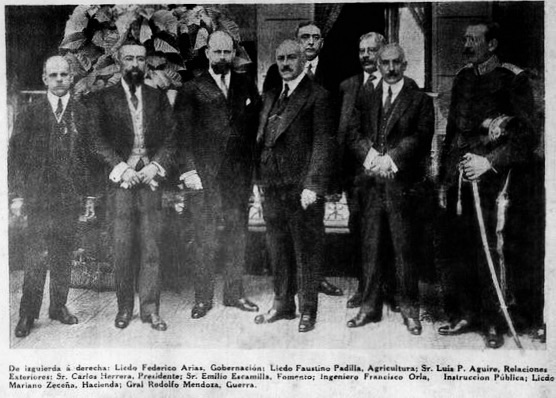
Herrera and his cabinet shortly before the coup d'état of 1921.

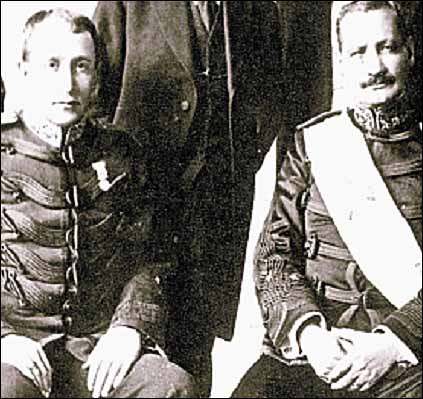
General José María Orellana (right) and general Jorge Ubico (left) after the coup d'état that deposed president Herrera in 1921.

Herrera was deposed in a coup, led by José María Orellana, in December 1921 after Herrera resisted to approve the concessions granted to the United Fruit Company and its subsidiaries by his predecessor, Manuel Estrada Cabrera. He subsequently went into exile in France.

== See also ==
- History of Guatemala

== Bibliography ==
- Arévalo Martínez, Rafael (1945). ¡Ecce Pericles!. Guatemala: Tipografia Nacional.
- Bauer Paiz, Alfonso (1965). Compilación de leyes laborales de Guatemala de 1872 a 1930 (in Spanish). Guatemala: Centro de Estudios Económicos y Sociales, University of San Carlos of Guatemala.
- Macmillan General Reference Staff (1 October 1998). Latin American lives: selected biographies from the five-volume Encyclopedia of Latin American history and culture. Macmillan Publishing. USA: Macmillan Library Reference. ISBN 9780028650609.

Preceded by Manuel Estrada Cabrera	President of Guatemala; 1920–1921	Succeeded by José María Orellana
