= Unionist Party (Guatemala, 1920) =

Unionist Party Partido Unionista
- Founded: December 25, 1919
- Dissolved: December 17, 1930
- Split from: Conservative Party (faction); Liberal Party (faction)
- Ideology: Liberalism; Unionism; Central American reunification
- Political position: Centre-right

The Unionist Party was a short-lived Guatemalan political party founded and dissolved in the 1920s.

== History ==
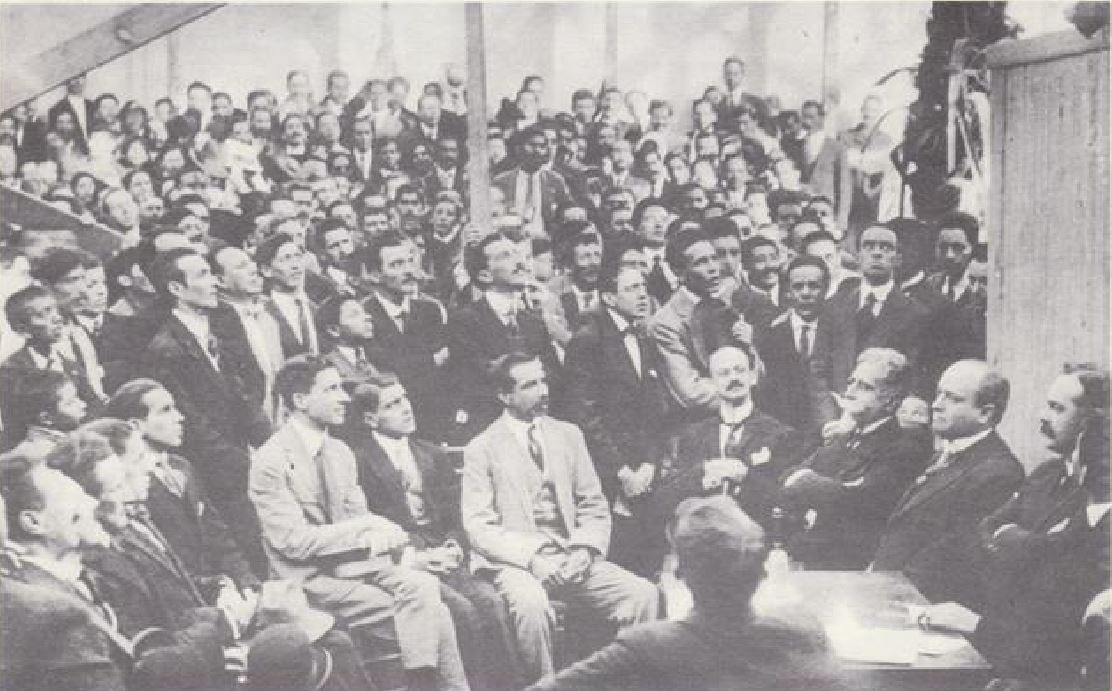
Photograph taken at the "Casa del Pueblo" in December 1919, at the time of signing the Act of the Three Folds. The conservative leaders of Guatemala are seen seated in front of the photograph: first from right to left, Dr. Julio Bianchi and third from right to left, citizen José Azmitia.

After his cousin's exile, the conservative leader Manuel Cobos Batres managed to convince prominent conservatives José Azmitia, Tácito Molina, Eduardo Camacho, Julio Bianchi and Emilio Escamilla on the formation of a party that rebelled against the fierce government of Estrada Cabrera. The party began its political activity with the support of many sectors, among which stood out the students of the Universidad Estrada Cabrera and the workers of the capital, who, led by Silverio Ortiz, founded the Patriotic Workers' Committee.

The new party was called Unionista, at the proposal of Tácito Molina, to differentiate it from both the Liberal and Conservative parties and to bring together in its ranks all those "men of good will, lovers of freedom and democracy, and with the ideal of a Central American Union." The first official headquarters of the party, inaugurated in 1920, was a house owned of the Escamilla family located on the southeast corner of 4th avenue and 12th street in zone 1, which was soon known as the «House of the People». Tácito Molina was also in charge of drafting the founding act of the party, which fifty-one citizens signed on December 25, 1919 and came to be known as the "Act of the Three Folds", since the signatures they were added on a sheet of paper folded three times; The document was circulated in the capital until January 1, 1920, with copies deposited under the door of each house.

From the beginning, it was agreed between the conservatives who formed the unionist party that no one would appear as head of the party, all their acts being carried out on behalf of the board of directors. The presidency of the sessions would be carried out by rotation, and not even the composition of the board was constant, since one of the alternates was frequently called to complete the number of seven directors, which was due to three reasons:

- Tácito Molina Izquierdo, legal director of the movement, always insisted on avoiding leadership in the new party.
- Without a visible head, it would be more difficult for the Government of Estrada Cabrera to attack the party.
- In anticipation of possible casualties among their members, the Conservatives had a large contingent of alternates, composed mainly of workers' representatives from the city.

The party had approximately fifty potential reserve directors.

== Bibliography ==
- Arévalo Martínez, Rafael (1945). ¡Ecce Pericles! (in Spanish). Guatemala: Tipografía Nacional.
- Bianchi, Julio (1941). "Prólogo de ¡Ecce Pericles!". Guatemala: Tipografía Nacional.
- Hernández de León, Federico (1930). El libro de las efemérides: capítulos de la historia de la América Central. Vol. 3. Guatemala: Sánchez & de Guise. OCLC 835567277.
- Ortiz Rivas, Silverio (1922). Reseña histórica de la parte que el elemento obrero tuvo en el Partido Unionista. Guatemala: Inédito.
