= Liberal Party (Guatemala) =

Liberal Party Partido Liberal
- Founded: 1820
- Dissolved: 1930s
- Merged into: Progressive Liberal Party (faction); Unionist Party (faction)
- Ideology: Liberalism; Laissez-faire; Anti-clericalism

The Liberal Party (Spanish: Partido Liberal, PL) was a political party in Guatemala.

== History ==
The party originated in the pre-independence Cacos group, who were in favour of a free market economic system. It became the ruling party of the Federal Republic of Central America in 1830 when Francisco Morazán became president. However, a civil war led to the dissolution of the federation and the Conservative Party taking power in Guatemala.

In 1871, the Liberal Party returned to power when Miguel García Granados became president. A series of Liberal presidents followed, including Manuel Estrada Cabrera, who ruled from 1889 until 1920 when Congress declared him insane, and elected the Unionist Party's Carlos Herrera as his replacement. The Unionist Party was formed by both former conservatives and liberals.

However, the party regained power in 1921 when José María Orellana removed President Carlos Herrera from office. Orellana was formally elected President the following year. The Liberals won all 69 seats in the 1923 Congressional elections, with the result repeated in 1925. In 1926, the Unionist Party led by Lázaro Chacón González regained power but was replaced in 1931 by the candidate of the Liberal–Progressive Liberal candidate Jorge Ubico.
