= 2019 Mixco mayoral election =

← 2015	16 June 2019	2023 →
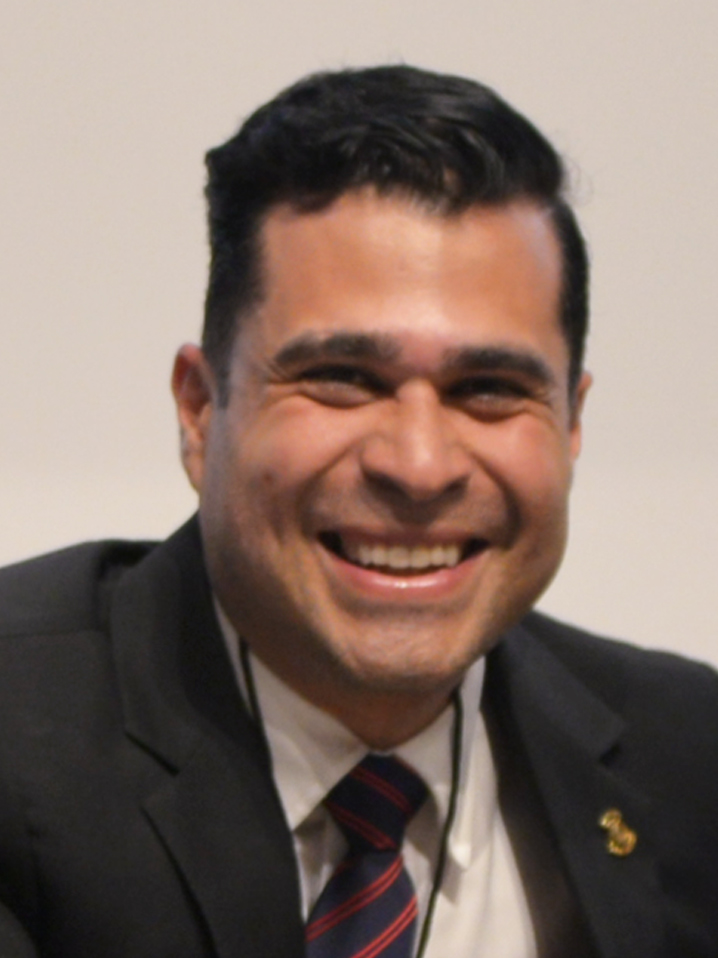

Candidate	Neto Bran	Luis Ruano	Iván Díaz
Party	Todos	Vamos	VIVA
Popular vote	83,529	15,503	8,375
Percentage	50.90%	9.45%	5.10%
Mayor before election
Neto Bran
Reform Movement
Elected Mayor
Neto Bran
Todos

The 2019 Mixco mayoral election was held on 16 June 2019.

The elections were held alongside the presidential, legislative, municipal and Central American Parliament elections.

Incumbent mayor Ernest "Neto" Steve Bran, elected by the Reform Movement (now called Podemos), ran for re-election with the Todos party.

== Results ==
Candidate	Party	Votes	%
Neto Bran	Todos	83,529	50.90
Luis Ruano	Vamos	15,503	9.45
Iván Díaz	Vision with Values	8,375	5.10
Esvin López	Victoria	5,644	3.44
Rafael Bocache	National Unity of Hope	5,540	3.38
Damaso Rosales	Commitment, Renewal and Order	4,620	2.82
Herberto Carrillo	Semilla	4,418	2.69
Wagner Roldán	Podemos	3,913	2.38
Yolanda Salguero	Winaq	3,877	2.36
Manuel Barrientos	Valor	3,334	2.03
Rodolfo González	Humanist Party of Guatemala	3,046	1.86
Fernando Alcayaga	Fuerza	2,732	1.66
Gonzalo Romero	National Convergence Front	2,360	1.44
Mario García	Unionist Party	2,262	1.38
Walter Brenner	Movement for the Liberation of Peoples	2,330	1.42
Érick Gómez	Bienestar Nacional	2,069	1.26
Daniel Chioc	National Advancement Party	2,064	1.26
Omar Rodas	Citizen Prosperity	1,610	0.98
Elder Figueroa	Avanza	1,450	0.88
Bryan Vásquez	Libre	1,268	0.77
Antonio Wohlers	Productivity and Work Party	1,102	0.67
Rigoberto Palacios	Encuentro por Guatemala	974	0.59
Adolfo Monterroso	Unidos	843	0.51
Edgar Sosa	National Change Union	814	0.50
Luciano Boror	Convergence	629	0.38
Invalid/blank votes		9,623	—
Total		173,740	—
Registered voters/turnout		264,762	65.62
Source: Supreme Electoral Tribunal
