= 2019 Villa Nueva mayoral election =

Local election in Guatemala

- 16 June 2019

| Candidate | Javier Gramajo | Domingo Sical | Elmer Hernández |
| Party | Fuerza | Todos | Vamos |
| Popular vote | 14,735 | 13,406 | 12,189 |
| Percentage | 12.32% | 11.12% | 10.19% |
Mayor before election
Edwin Escobar Hill
LIDER
Elected Mayor
Javier Gramajo
Fuerza

The 2019 Villa Nueva mayoral election will be held on 16 June 2019.

The elections will be held alongside the presidential, legislative, municipal and Central American Parliament elections.

The current mayor Edwin Escobar Hill, elected by the extinct Renewed Democratic Liberty, is not running for re-election, because he is running as a presidential candidate.

== Results ==
| Candidate | Party | Votes | % |
|---|---|---|---|
| Javier Gramajo | Fuerza | 14,735 | 12.32 |
| José Domingo Sical | Todos | 13,406 | 11.21 |
| Elmer Hernández | Vamos | 12,189 | 10.19 |
| Yang Roca | National Unity of Hope | 10,373 | 8.67 |
| María Teresa Gómez | Citizen Prosperity | 9,361 | 7.83 |
| Esaú Burgos | Unionist Party | 8,788 | 7.35 |
| Francisco René Pineda | Vision with Values | 6,736 | 5.63 |
| Leonel Carpio | Victoria | 4,400 | 3.68 |
| Natanael Ortega | Humanist Party of Guatemala | 4,321 | 3.61 |
| Mayra Martínez | Winaq | 4,131 | 3.45 |
| Yuri Bladimir Morales | Bienestar Nacional | 4,120 | 3.44 |
| Byron Leonel Ovando | Semilla | 3,628 | 3.03 |
| William Canesa | National Advancement Party | 3,604 | 3.01 |
| Héctor Giovanni Santos | Commitment, Renewal and Order | 3,324 | 2.78 |
| Franco Vinicio Reyes | Valor | 2,825 | 2.36 |
| Luis Eduardo Castillo | Movement for the Liberation of Peoples | 2,612 | 2.18 |
| Amílcar Mungía | National Change Union | 2,365 | 1.98 |
| Job Montt | Avanza | 1,730 | 1.45 |
| Edgar Torres | Libre | 1,722 | 1.44 |
| Fredy Rolando Martínez | Encuentro por Guatemala | 1,540 | 1.29 |
| Santos Natalio Chic | Guatemalan National Revolutionary Unity | 1,454 | 1.22 |
| Vacant | Unidos | 858 | 0.72 |
| Vacant | Podemos | 604 | 0.50 |
| Axel Noriega | Convergence | 527 | 0.44 |
| Armando Aragón | Productivity and Work Party | 379 | 0.32 |
| Invalid/blank votes | | 7,457 | — |
| Total | | 127,083 | — |
| Registered voters/turnout | | 212,095 | 59.92 |
Source: Supreme Electoral Tribunal
