= 2019 Escuintla mayoral election =

Local election in Guatemala

- 16 June 2019

| Candidate | Abraham Rivera | Alma Bercián | Julio Corado |
| Party | Victoria | UNE | CREO |
| Popular vote | 9,672 | 7,948 | 3,863 |
| Percentage | 22.37% | 18.38% | 8.93% |
Mayor before election
Abraham Rivera
LIDER
Elected Mayor
Abraham Rivera
Victoria

The 2019 Escuintla mayoral election will be held on 16 June 2019.

The elections will be held next to the presidential, legislative, municipal and Central American Parliament elections.

The current mayor Abraham Rivera Estévez, elected by the extinct Renewed Democratic Liberty, is running for re-election with Victoria party. Victoria has been criticized for being considered an "electoral vehicle" used by the Rivera family.

== Results ==
| Candidate | Party | Votes | % |
|---|---|---|---|
| Abraham Rivera | Victoria | 9,672 | 22.37 |
| Lorena Bercián | National Unity of Hope | 7,948 | 18.38 |
| Julio Héctor Corado | Commitment, Renewal and Order | 3,863 | 8.93 |
| Arturo González | Bienestar Nacional | 3,611 | 8.35 |
| Azucena Morales | Vamos | 2,529 | 5.85 |
| Úrsula McFarlane | National Convergence Front | 2,379 | 5.50 |
| Junior Granillo | Todos | 2,324 | 5.37 |
| Rafael Maldonado | Humanist Party of Guatemala | 1,601 | 3.70 |
| Wilfredo Calderón | National Change Union | 1,295 | 3.00 |
| Antonio Rivera | Vision with Values | 1,129 | 2.61 |
| Alberto Urías | Guatemalan National Revolutionary Unity | 1,101 | 2.55 |
| José María Acevedo | Semilla | 1,100 | 2.54 |
| Julio César Urizar | Libre | 1,046 | 2.42 |
| René Talento | Fuerza | 540 | 1.25 |
| Fermín Reyes | Movement for the Liberation of Peoples | 524 | 1.21 |
| Blanca Solares | Citizen Prosperity | 474 | 1.10 |
| Antonio Montepeque | Valor | 439 | 1.02 |
| Cristóbal Quevedo | Podemos | 390 | 0.90 |
| Enrique Sandoval | Unionist Party | 375 | 0.87 |
| José Manuel Lepe | Winaq | 355 | 0.82 |
| Julio Enrique Catalán | Unidos | 165 | 0.38 |
| Alfredo Bernal | Convergence | 156 | 0.36 |
| Vacant | Productivity and Work Party | 82 | 0.19 |
| Invalid/blank votes | | 3,372 | — |
| Total | | 46,610 | — |
| Registered voters/turnout | | 80,305 | 58.04 |
Source: Supreme Electoral Tribunal
