= 2019 Quetzaltenango mayoral election =

16 June Mayoral elections

| ← 2015 | 16 June 2019 | 2023 → |

| Candidate | Fernando López | Francisco Santos | Patrick Gramajo |
| Party | PHG | Fuerza | Valor |
| Popular vote | 13,551 | 5,794 | 5,785 |
| Percentage | 21.76% | 9.30% | 9.29% |
Mayor before election
Luis Grijalva
EG
Elected Mayor
Fernando López
PHG

A mayoral election was held in Quetzaltenango on 16 June 2019.

The elections were held next to the presidential, legislative, municipal and Central American Parliament elections. Twenty candidates were presented.

The previous mayor, Luis Grijalva Minera, did not run for re-election due to possible cases of corruption, as well as ideological discrepancies with the party that postulated him.

== Results ==
| Candidate | Party | Votes | % |
|---|---|---|---|
| Fernando López | Humanist Party of Guatemala | 13,551 | 21.76 |
| Francisco Santos | Fuerza | 5,794 | 9.30 |
| Patrick Gramajo | Valor | 5,785 | 9.29 |
| Hugo Soto | Commitment, Renewal and Order | 4,754 | 7.63 |
| María Teresa Castillo | Winaq | 3,579 | 5.75 |
| Julio Aceituno | Vision with Values | 3,301 | 5.30 |
| Jesús Cifuentes | Vamos | 3,251 | 5.22 |
| Marvin de León | National Change Union | 3,059 | 4.91 |
| Natán Rodas | Citizen Prosperity | 3,054 | 4.90 |
| Donald Urizar | Semilla | 2,836 | 4.55 |
| Miguel de León | National Advancement Party | 2,423 | 3.89 |
| Frank Ríos | Independent | 1,951 | 3.13 |
| Francisco Mérida | Podemos | 1,864 | 2.99 |
| Oswaldo Torres | Libre | 1,065 | 1.71 |
| Soraya Hernández | Bienestar Nacional | 984 | 1.58 |
| Jorge Ixquiac | Guatemalan National Revolutionary Unity | 950 | 1.53 |
| Labrenty Cabrera | Avanza | 778 | 1.25 |
| Pedro Luis Chávez | National Unity of Hope | 751 | 1.21 |
| Francisco Lara | Todos | 603 | 0.97 |
| Elvia Barrundia | Unionist Party | 576 | 0.93 |
| Juan de León | Productivity and Work Party | 489 | 0.79 |
| Edwin Castro | Unidos | 257 | 0.51 |
| Invalid/blank votes | | 3,995 | — |
| Total | | 66,265 | — |
| Registered voters/turnout | | 106,443 | 62.25 |
Source: Supreme Electoral Tribunal
