= 2019 Antigua Guatemala mayoral election =

Local election in Guatemala

- 16 June 2019

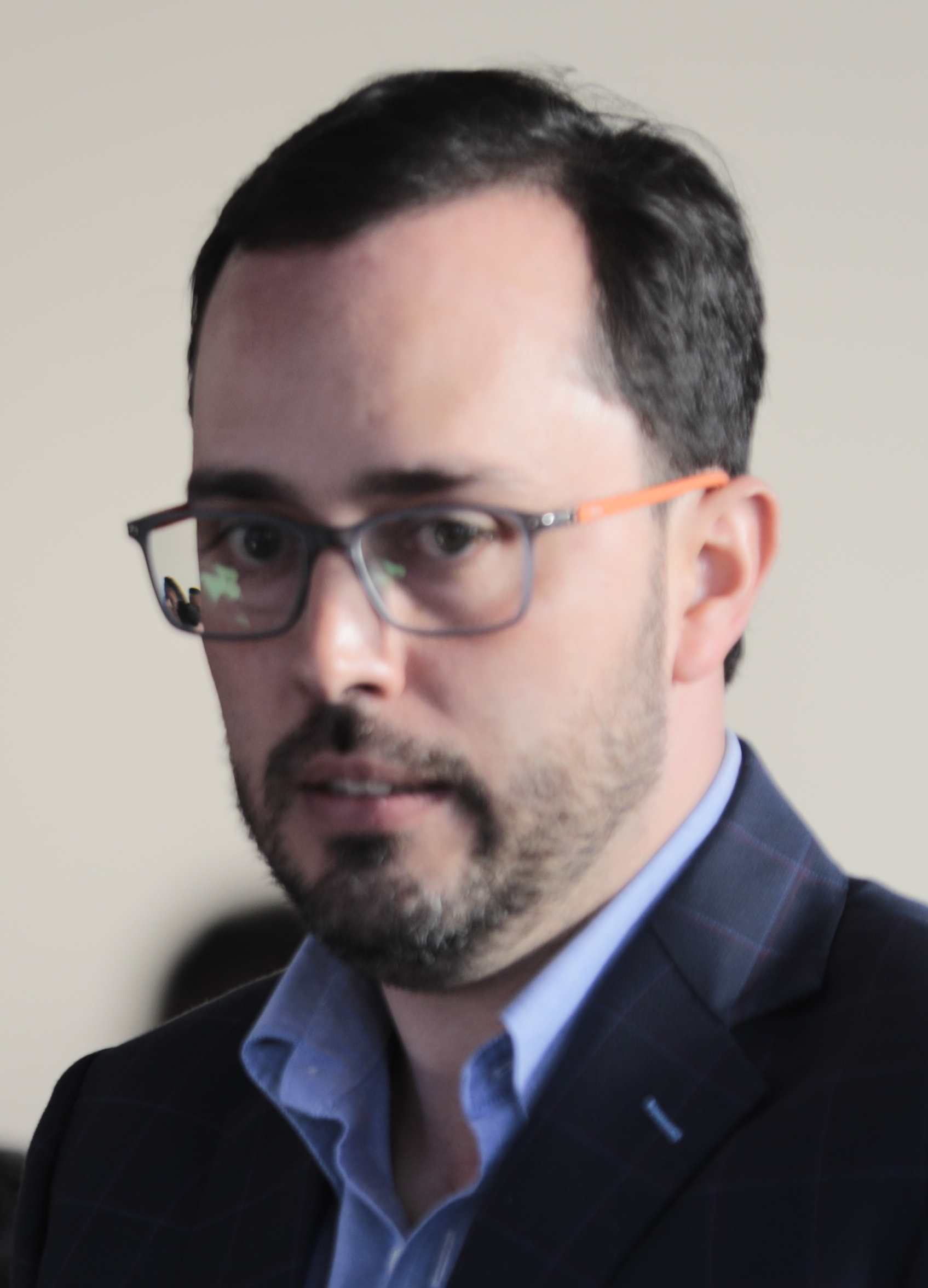

Candidate	Víctor Hugo del Pozo	Juan Manuel Asturias	René Aguilar
Party	Todos	Independent	UNE
Popular vote	4,271	3,438	2,965
Percentage	18.33%	14.75%	12.72%
Mayor before election
Susana Asensio
Independent
Elected Mayor
Víctor Hugo del Pozo
Todos

The 2019 Antigua Guatemala mayoral election was held on 16 June 2019.

The elections will be held next to the presidential, legislative, municipal and Central American Parliament elections.

The current mayor Susana Asensio is not running for re-election. She does not have the legal requirements to qualify for re-election. Asensio was elected mayor in 2015 with a civic committee called "Antigua en Buenas Manos" (English: Antigua in Good Hands).

== Results ==
Candidate	Party	Votes	%
Víctor Hugo del Pozo	Todos	4,271	18.33
Juan Manuel Asturias	Independent	3,438	14.75
René Aguilar	National Unity of Hope	2,965	12.72
Antonio Estrada	Unionist Party	2,494	10.70
Edgar Vivar	Independent	1,327	5.69
Victor Hugo González	Independent	1,096	4.70
Edwin Marroquín	Vision with Values	1,082	4.64
Juan Carlos Luna	Vamos	1,069	4.59
Felipe de León	Citizen Prosperity	863	3.70
Leonel Papa	Libre	844	3.62
Manuel Tó	Valor	650	2.79
Alberto Soto	Fuerza	544	2.33
Sergio Moreira	Encuentro por Guatemala	509	2.18
Manuel Godoy	Victoria	424	1.82
Marco Tulio Iquique	Humanist Party of Guatemala	368	1.58
Juan Luis Reyes	Movement for the Liberation of Peoples	350	1.50
Bryon Samayoa	Commitment, Renewal and Order	338	1.45
Álvaro Hernández	Productivity and Work Party	301	1.29
Vacant	Semilla	253	1.09
Vacant	National Change Union	118	0.51
Invalid/blank votes		1,070	—
Total		24,374	—
Registered voters/turnout		34,527	70.59
Source: Supreme Electoral Tribunal
