= 2019 Guatemala City mayoral election =

- 16 June 2019
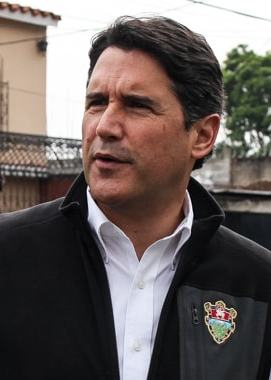

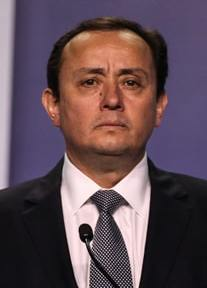

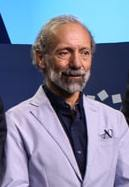
| Candidate | Ricardo Quiñónez | Roberto González | Álvaro Véliz |
| Party | Unionist | CREO | Semilla |
| Popular vote | 167,985 | 152,932 | 42,417 |
| Percentage | 38.31% | 34.87% | 9.67% |
Mayor before election
Ricardo Quiñónez
Unionist
Elected Mayor
Ricardo Quiñónez
Unionist

The 2019 Guatemala City mayoral election was held on 16 June 2019.

The elections will be held next to the presidential, legislative, municipal and Central American Parliament elections. Twenty-three candidates were presented.

The current mayor Ricardo Quiñónez took office after the death of Álvaro Arzú, and is presented for the first time as a candidate for mayor and maintain the hegemony of the Unionist Party in Guatemala City.

The polls show a close contest between the opposition candidate Roberto González Díaz-Durán from the Commitment, Renewal and Order (CREO), which competes for the third time to win the mayor's office and the current mayor Ricardo Quiñónez Lemus of Unionist Party.

They are followed by Álvaro Véliz of Semilla, Luis García of Fuerza and Fernando Sánchez of the National Unity of Hope.

In this election, they are also elected to titular and alternate councilors who will make up the Municipal Council of Guatemala City.

== Opinion polls ==
The table below lists voting intention estimates in reverse chronological order, showing the most recent first and using the dates when the survey fieldwork was done, as opposed to the date of publication. Where the fieldwork dates are unknown, the date of publication is given instead. The highest percentage figure in each polling survey is displayed with its background shaded in the leading party's colour. If a tie ensues, this is applied to the figures with the highest percentages.

The "Lead" column on the right shows the percentage-point difference between the parties with the highest percentages in a given poll. When available, seat projections are also displayed below the voting estimates in a smaller font.

| Polling firm/Commissioner | Fieldwork date | Sample size | Avendaño PHG | Brolo Vamos | García Fuerza | González CREO | Marroquín EG | Quiñónez Unionist | Sánchez UNE | Véliz Semilla | Others | None | Lead |
|---|---|---|---|---|---|---|---|---|---|---|---|---|---|
| CID-Gallup | 1–7 June | 1,388 | 1.0 | 1.0 | 1.0 | 28.9 | 1.0 | 32.7 | 3.7 | 3.4 | 8.7 | 17.9 | 3.8 |
| Prodatos | 24–29 May | 506 | 0.4 | 1.4 | 3.5 | 24.9 | 1.6 | 38.5 | 2.8 | 4.1 | 9.6 | 13.2 | 13.6 |
| Demoscopia | 31 May | 600 | — | — | 0.7 | 25.6 | — | 39.8 | — | 0.7 | 7.0 | 27.1 | 13.3 |
| OPol Consultores | 20–23 May | 2,200 | 1.4 | 1.3 | 1.2 | 20.0 | 10.0 | 38.0 | — | 1.0 | 0.2 | 26.9 | 18.0 |
| Borges y Asociados | 12–16 May | 600 | — | — | — | 40.1 | — | 37.2 | — | — | — | 22.6 | 2.9 |
| Borges y Asociados | 12–16 May | 600 | 1.6 | 1.8 | 0.6 | 32.7 | 0.9 | 28 | — | 2.8 | 4.5 | 27.1 | 4.7 |
| Demoscopia | 9–11 May | 600 | — | — | 2.5 | 22.2 | — | 36.2 | — | 4.6 | 8.9 | 25.6 | 14.0 |
| Borges y Asociados | 14–17 April | 600 | — | — | — | 37.6 | — | 31.4 | — | — | — | 30.9 | 6.2 |
| Borges y Asociados | 14–17 April | 600 | 1.3 | 1.2 | 1.2 | 36.9 | 2.0 | 31.4 | — | 1.0 | 0.4 | 24.6 | 5.5 |
| Borges y Asociados | 14–17 February | 600 | — | — | — | 31.7 | — | 29.3 | — | — | — | 39 | 2.4 |

== Results ==
| Candidate | Party | Votes | % |
|---|---|---|---|
| Ricardo Quiñónez | Unionist Party | 167,985 | 38.31 |
| Roberto González | Commitment, Renewal and Order | 152,932 | 34.87 |
| Álvaro Véliz | Semilla | 42,417 | 9.67 |
| Moisés Abraham Fialko | Vision with Values | 10,667 | 2.43 |
| Pedro Brolo | Vamos | 9,527 | 2.17 |
| Alfonso García | Fuerza | 8,680 | 1.98 |
| Carlos Avendaño | Humanist Party of Guatemala | 7,794 | 1.78 |
| Gonzalo Marroquín | Encuentro por Guatemala | 7,459 | 1.70 |
| Fernando Sánchez | National Unity of Hope | 7,012 | 1.60 |
| Ofelia Rodríguez | Libre | 5,013 | 1.14 |
| Alberto "Beto" Valladares | National Change Union | 3,788 | 0.86 |
| Noé Solares | Productivity and Work Party | 3,416 | 0.78 |
| Eduardo Prado | Todos | 3,049 | 0.70 |
| Hugo Bollat | National Convergence Front | 2,058 | 0.47 |
| Flor de María Alvarado | Victory | 1,981 | 0.45 |
| Rokael Cardona | Convergence | 1,671 | 0.38 |
| Arturo Herrera | Citizen Prosperity | 1,583 | 0.36 |
| Rubén García | National Welfare | 1,509 | 0.34 |
| Total | | 438,541 | 100.00 |
Source: TSE
