= Opinion polling for the 2023 Guatemalan general election =

In the run up to the Guatemalan general election scheduled to take place on 25 June 2023, various organisations carry out opinion polling to gauge voting intention in Guatemala. Results of such polls are displayed in this article.

Poll results are listed in the tables below in reverse chronological order, showing the most recent first, and using the date the survey's fieldwork was done, as opposed to the date of publication. If such date is unknown, the date of publication is given instead. The highest percentage figure in each polling survey is displayed in bold, and the background shaded in the leading party's color. In the instance that there is a tie, then no figure is shaded.

== First round ==
=== Graphical summary ===
Local regression of all polls conducted.

=== Official campaign polling ===
The table below contains polls conducted after the official start of the campaign period in March 2023.

| Polling firm | Fieldwork date | Sample size | Arévalo Semilla | Castillo VIVA | Conde Vamos | Mulet Cabal | Pineda PC | Ríos Valor–PU | Rivera Victory | Torres UNE | Villacorta VOS | Others | No one |
|---|---|---|---|---|---|---|---|---|---|---|---|---|---|
| **2023 general election** | 25 June 2023 | —N/a | **15.5%** | 9.4% | 10.4% | 8.8% | —N/a | 8.7% | 3.3% | **21.1%** | 5.6% | 17.2% | —N/a |
| Carlos Pineda | 21 Jun 2023 | —N/a | 6.7% | 4.4% | 4.5% | **17.9%** | —N/a | 16.1% | 2.4% | **16.6%** | 13.8% | 14.3% (Note: ▌ Reyes (BIEN): 3.2% ▌ Espada (PR): 1.6% ▌ Farchi (Blue): 1.5% ▌ Sagastume (Todos): 1.3% ▌ Pop (Winaq–URNG): 1.0% ▌ Arredondo (CREO): 1.0% ▌ Guzmán (PPN): 1.0% ▌ Trujillo (Change): 0.8% ▌ Talamonti (UR): 0.8% ▌ Peña (Elephant): 0.8% ▌ Mérida (PHG): 0.4% ▌ Lam (PIN): 0.4% ▌ Clavería (MF): 0.3% ▌ Morales (FCN): 0.2%) | 3.4% |
| Espacio Muestral | 16–19 Jun 2023 | 1,200 | —N/a | —N/a | —N/a | 15.5% | —N/a | **19.1%** | —N/a | **17.8%** | 11.4% | 36.2% | |
| C&E Research | 13 Jun 2023 | 400 | —N/a | 1.0% | —N/a | 21.0% | —N/a | **22.0%** | 1.0% | **23.0%** | 9.0% | 23.0% | —N/a |
| Grupo Impacto 360 | 9–12 Jun 2023 | 900 | —N/a | —N/a | —N/a | 16.8% | —N/a | **25.5%** | —N/a | **21.5%** | —N/a | 17.3% | 18.9% |
| Prodatos / Prensa Libre | 5–14 Jun 2023 | 1,202 | 2.9% | 5.2% | 5.8% | **13.4%** | —N/a | 9.1% | 5.3% | **21.3%** | 5.2% | 18.3% (Note: ▌ Espada (PR): 2.3% ▌ Reyes (BIEN): 2.3% ▌ Guzmán (PPN): 2.1% ▌ Clavería (MF): 1.8% ▌ Farchi (Blue): 1.8% ▌ Pop (Winaq–URNG): 1.4% ▌ Morales (FCN): 1.3% ▌ Talamonti (UR): 1.3% ▌ Peña (Elephant): 1.3% ▌ Sagastume (Todos): 1.1% ▌ Mérida (PHG): 0.9% ▌ Arredondo (CREO): 0.3% ▌ Lam (PIN): 0.3% ▌ Trujillo (Change): 0.1%) | 13.5% |
| ConDatos | Jun 2023 | 840 | 6.8% | 4.3% | 5.5% | **13.6%** | —N/a | 11.1% | 5.0% | **13.9%** | 11.3% | 19.1% (Note: ▌ Espada (PR): 5.2% ▌ Reyes (BIEN): 3.9% ▌ Farchi (Blue): 3.5% ▌ Peña (Elephant): 1.8% ▌ Talamonti (UR): 1.5% ▌ Morales (FCN): 1.3% Others: 1.9%) | 9.4% |
| TResearch International | 31 May–6 Jun 2023 | 1,004 | —N/a | —N/a | 8.3% | 16.0% | —N/a | **19.8%** | —N/a | **19.2%** | 1.4% | 19.2% | —N/a |
| TResearch International | 31 May–6 Jun 2023 | 1,004 | 4.6% | 2.1% | 2.5% | 11.9% | 14.7% | **17.3%** | 1.6% | **15.9%** | —N/a | 22.1% (Note: ▌ Reyes (BIEN): 1.8% ▌ Farchi (Blue): 1.2% ▌ Peña (Elephant): 0.6% ▌ Pop (Winaq–URNG): 0.4% ▌ Sagastume (Todos): 0.3% ▌ Mérida (PHG): 0.3% Others: 17.5%) | 7.6% |
| 19 May 2023 | | | Carlos Pineda's candidacy was suspended by the courts | | | | | | | | | | |
| Grupo Impacto 360 | 17–20 May 2023 | 900 | —N/a | —N/a | —N/a | 14.6% | **20.1%** | **22.9%** | —N/a | 17.9% | —N/a | 13.2% | 11.3% |
| Innovem / La Voz de Xela | 16–21 May 2023 | 8,176 | 0.7% | 0.4% | 2.9% | 8.0% | **16.5%** | 10.0% | 1.2% | **20.0%** | 1.5% | 7.5% (Note: ▌ Farchi (Blue): 1.2% ▌ Espada (PR): 1.0% ▌ Pop (Winaq–URNG): 0.9% ▌ Talamonti (UR): 0.7% ▌ Sagastume (Todos): 0.6% ▌ Reyes (BIEN): 0.5% ▌ Clavería (MF): 0.5% ▌ Guzmán (PPN): 0.5% ▌ Trujillo (Change): 0.4% ▌ Morales (FCN): 0.3% ▌ Mérida (PHG): 0.3% ▌ Lam (PIN): 0.3% ▌ Peña (Elephant): 0.2% ▌ Arredondo (CREO): 0.1% Others: 0.1%) | 31.3% |
| CID Gallup / Con Criterio | 10–20 May 2023 | 1,204 | —N/a | 2.0% | 4.0% | 14.0% | **22.0%** | 16.0% | 2.0% | **20.0%** | 2.0% | 11.0% | 7.0% |
| CID Gallup / Con Criterio | 10–20 May 2023 | 1,204 | —N/a | 2.0% | 4.0% | **21.0%** | —N/a | 19.0% | 2.0% | **23.0%** | 2.0% | 12.0% | 16.0% |
| TResearch International | 3–9 May 2023 | 1,000 | —N/a | —N/a | 2.3% | 16.3% | **20.9%** | **19.6%** | —N/a | 17.4% | 4.1% | 12.3% | 7.1% |
| Massive Caller | May 2023 | 1,000 | —N/a | —N/a | 3.8% | **13.5%** | **19.8%** | 8.6% | —N/a | 5.2% | —N/a | 17.2% | 31.9% |
| TResearch International | 26 Apr–2 May 2023 | 1,000 | —N/a | —N/a | 3.4% | 17.5% | 18.0% | **19.2%** | —N/a | **18.4%** | 4.0% | 13.7% | 5.7% |
| Nuestro Diario | 19–26 Apr 2023 | 1,723 | 2.0% | —N/a | 2.4% | **10.4%** | **28.3%** | 10.0% | 3.3% | 10.3% | 4.7% | 19.0% | 11.6% |
| C&E Research | 16–22 Apr 2023 | 2,400 | —N/a | 1.6% | 3.4% | 11.1% | 9.5% | **14.3%** | 1.0% | **16.5%** | —N/a | 8.8% (Note: ▌ Espada (PR): 1.0% ▌ Farchi (Blue): 1.0% ▌ Pop (Winaq–URNG): 0.5% Others: 6.9%) | 33.2% |
| C&E Research | 16–22 Apr 2023 | 2,400 | 1.0% | 0.9% | 4.6% | 11.5% | 9.5% | **13.5%** | 1.7% | **17.5%** | —N/a | 15.0% (Note: ▌ Morales (FCN): 1.5% ▌ Mérida (PHG): 1.5% ▌ Espada (PR): 1.4% ▌ Pop (Winaq–URNG): 1.2% ▌ Arredondo (CREO): 1.1% ▌ Reyes (BIEN): 0.9% ▌ Talamonti (UR): 0.8% ▌ Farchi (Blue): 0.8% ▌ Sagastume (Todos): 0.7% ▌ Peña (Elephant): 0.6% ▌ Trujillo (Change): 0.5% ▌ Lam (PIN): 0.2% ▌ Guzmán (PPN): 0.0% ▌ Clavería (MF): 0.0% Others: 3.7%) | 24.8% |
| Prodatos / Prensa Libre | 14–23 Apr 2023 | 1,202 | 0.7% | 1.8% | 5.0% | 10.1% | **23.1%** | 9.2% | 3.4% | **19.5%** | 3.1% | 17.8% (Note: ▌ Morales (FCN): 2.2% ▌ Reyes (BIEN): 1.9% ▌ Arredondo (CREO): 1.9% ▌ Farchi (Blue): 1.7% ▌ Pop (Winaq–URNG): 1.6% ▌ Guzmán (PPN): 1.4% ▌ Sagastume (Todos): 1.3% ▌ Talamonti (UR): 1.2% ▌ Mérida (PHG): 1.0% ▌ Peña (Elephant): 1.0% ▌ Espada (PR): 1.0% ▌ Clavería (MF): 1.0% ▌ Trujillo (Change): 0.7% ▌ Lam (PIN): 0.0%) | 6.3% |
| TResearch International | 17 Apr 2023 | —N/a | —N/a | —N/a | 4.5% | **19.1%** | 10.2% | **22.1%** | —N/a | 17.8% | 3.9% | 15.2% | 7.2% |
| Massive Caller | Apr 2023 | 1,000 | —N/a | —N/a | 3.2% | **14.1%** | 11.3% | **13.5%** | —N/a | 6.9% | —N/a | 15.8% | 35.2% |
| TResearch International | 8–12 Mar 2023 | 1,000 | —N/a | —N/a | 4.7% | 16.5% | 8.2% | **23.2%** | —N/a | **17.7%** | 4.9% | 13.4% | 11.4% |

=== Sub-national polling ===
==== Quetzaltenango ====
| Polling firm | Fieldwork date | Sample size | Clavería My Family | Conde Vamos | Mulet Cabal | Ríos Valor–PU | Torres UNE | Villacorta VOS | Others | No one |
|---|---|---|---|---|---|---|---|---|---|---|
| Innovem / La Voz de Xela | 16–21 May 2023 | —N/a | 9.6% | 7.2% | 12.1% | **15.7%** | **20.5%** | 7.2% | 27.7% (Note: ▌ Peña (Elephant): 6.0% ▌ Farchi (Blue): 3.6% ▌ Mérida (PHG): 3.6% ▌ Rivera (Victory): 3.6% ▌ Pineda (PC): 3.6% ▌ Arévalo (Semilla): 2.4% ▌ Sagastume (Todos): 1.2% ▌ Espada (PR): 1.2% ▌ Guzmán (PPN): 1.2% ▌ Castillo (VIVA): 1.2%) | —N/a |

=== Pre-campaign polling ===
| Polling firm | Fieldwork date | Sample size | Arzú Podemos | Cabrera MLP | Mulet Cabal | Torres UNE | Ríos Valor–PU | Others | No one |
|---|---|---|---|---|---|---|---|---|---|
| Massive Caller | 10 March 2023 | 1,000 | —N/a | —N/a | **13.5%** | 8.9% | 14.3% | 28.8% (Note: Manuel Conde Orellana: 6.1%, Álvaro Trujillo: 3.0%, others: 19.7%) | 34.5% |
| CID Gallup | 24 Jan–4 Feb 2023 | 1,200 | 13% | 7% | 10% | **20%** | 21% | 15% (Note: Carlos Pineda: 3%, Rafael Espada 2%, others: 10%) | 14% |
| Massive Caller | Feb 2023 | 1,000 | 4.8% | 10.5% | **13.6%** | 7.5% | 14.6% | 13.4% | 35.6% |
| Massive Caller | 7 Jan 2023 | 1,000 | 6.2% | 11.3% | **13.4%** | 7.0% | 14.4% | 13.4% (Note: Carlos Pineda: 4.3%, others: 9.1%) | 34.3% |
| Massive Caller | Dec 2022 | 1,000 | 3.6% | 8.8% | **14.5%** | 6.0% | 13.1% | 16.2% (Note: Carlos Pineda: 3.2%, others: 13.0%) | 37.8% |
| CID Gallup | Dec 2022 | – | 9% | 5% | 4% | **14%** | 16% | 12% | 40% |
| Massive Caller | Nov 2022 | 1,000 | 4.6% | 7.1% | **15.7%** | 5.4% | 14.1% | 17.3% (Note: Carlos Pineda: 5.4%, others: 11.9%) | 34.3% |
| CID Gallup / Con Criterio | 9 Oct 2022 | 1,202 | 8.0% | 6.0% | 11.0% | **14.0%** | 22.0% | 21.0% (Note: Neto Bran: 7.0%, Manuel Conde: 4.0%, Manuel Villacorta: 2.0%, Rafael Espada: 2.0%, Ricardo Méndez: 2.0%, Carlos Pineda: 1.0%, Amílcar Rivera: 1.0%, Julio Rivera: 1.0%, Isaac Farchi: 1.0%, others: 1.0%) | 18.0% |
| Massive Caller | 9 Oct 2022 | 1,000 | 5.1% | 9.2% | **14.1%** | 5.8% | 15.5% | 12.0% (Note: Carlos Pineda: 2.6%, others: 9.4%) | 38.3% |
| C&E Research | 28 Sep 2022 | 600 | 15.0% | 14.0% | 11.0% | **21.0%** | 32.0% | 7.0% (Note: Neto Bran: 7.0%) | N/A |
| Massive Caller | Sep 2022 | 1,000 | 4.8% | 11.4% | **13.3%** | 5.6% | 14.9% | 12.8% (Note: Carlos Pineda: 4.4%, others: 8.4%) | 37.2% |
| J. Napolitan y Asociados | 5–9 Sep 2022 | 1,800 | 11.2% | 5.2% | 6.5% | **14.9%** | 16.4% | 13.5% (Note: Neto Bran: 4.2%, Manuel Villacorta: 2.1%, others: 7.2%) | 32.3% |
| Datum | 29–31 Aug 2022 | 1,200 | 6.0% | 8.0% | 9.0% | **12.0%** | 14% | 20% (Note: Manuel Villacorta: 7.0%, Oscar R. Castañeda: 5.0%, Manuel Conde: 3.0%, Rafael Espada: 3.0%, Ricardo Sagastume: 2.0%) | 31% |
| C&E Research | 3 Jul 2022 | 585 | 7.0% | 5.0% | 16.0% | **29.0%** | 31.0% | 12.0% (Note: Neto Bran: 3.0%, others: 9.0%) | N/A |
| TResearch International | 3–5 May 2022 | 1,000 | 5.2% | 5.6% | 10.3% | **13.5%** | 25.2% | 40.2% | |

== Second round ==
=== Official campaign polling ===
| Polling firm | Fieldwork date | Sample size | Arévalo Semilla | Torres UNE | Blank/ Null |
|---|---|---|---|---|---|
| **Second round** | 20 August 2023 | — | **60.9%** | 39.1% | — |
| Prodatos / Prensa Libre | 10–14 August 2023 | 1,200 | **64.9%** | 35.1% | — |
| Prodatos / Prensa Libre | 10–14 August 2023 | 1,200 | **53.6%** | 29.0% | 17.4% |
| CID Gallup | 4–13 August 2023 | 1,819 | **64.0%** | 36.0% | — |
| CID Gallup | 18–27 July 2023 | 1,242 | **63.0%** | 37.0% | — |
| Innovem | 20–26 July 2023 | 3,773 | 37.8% | **45.0%** | 17.2% |

== Favorable or unfavorable opinions ==
=== Favorable opinions ===
| Polling firm | Fieldwork date | Sample size | Cifuentes Valor–PU | Conde Vamos | Mulet Cabal | Pineda PC | Ríos Valor–PU | Torres UNE | Villacorta VOS |
|---|---|---|---|---|---|---|---|---|---|
| TResearch International | 8–12 Mar 2023 | 1,000 | 2.4% | 5.6% | 21.6% | 12.4% | **25.1%** | 19.2% | 19.2% |

=== Most favorite for president ===
| Polling firm | Fieldwork date | Sample size | Cifuentes Valor–PU | Conde Vamos | Mulet Cabal | Pineda PC | Ríos Valor–PU | Torres UNE | Villacorta VOS |
|---|---|---|---|---|---|---|---|---|---|
| TResearch International | 8–12 Mar 2023 | 1,000 | 1.2% | 4.1% | 14.7% | 9.8% | **19.1%** | 13.8% | 12.3% |

=== Perception of triumph ===
| Polling firm | Fieldwork date | Sample size | Conde Vamos | Mulet Cabal | Pineda PC | Ríos Valor–PU | Torres UNE | Villacorta VOS | Others | No one |
|---|---|---|---|---|---|---|---|---|---|---|
| TResearch International | 8–12 Mar 2023 | 1,000 | 3.5% | 14.9% | 5.9% | **23.4%** | 19.8% | 4.2% | 10.0% | 18.1% |
