= Guillermo Castillo Reyes =

Vice president of Guatemala from 2020 to 2024

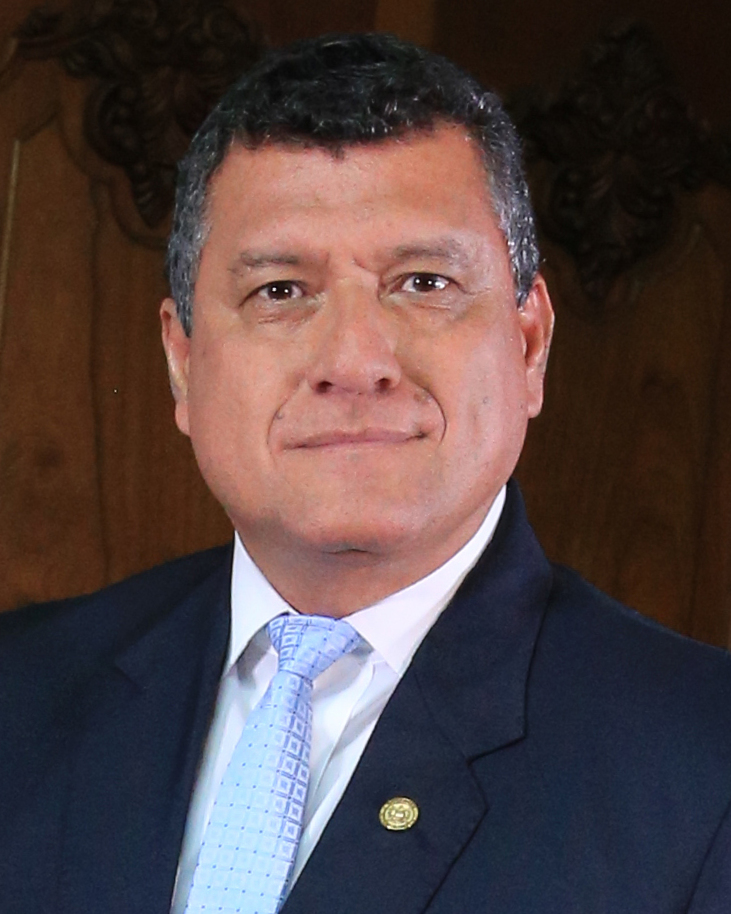
- Official portrait, 2020

17th Vice President of Guatemala
- In office 14 January 2020 – 14 January 2024
- President: Alejandro Giammattei
- Preceded by: Jafeth Cabrera
- Succeeded by: Karin Herrera

Personal details
- Born: 17 March 1966 (age 60) Huehuetenango, Guatemala
- Party: Independent (since 2020)
- Other political affiliations: Vamos (until 2020)
- Spouse: Lisette Arriaga
- Children: 1
- Education: Universidad de San Carlos de Guatemala

César Guillermo Castillo Reyes (Spanish pronunciation: [ɡiˈʝeɾmo kasˈtiʝo ˈreʝes]: born 17 March 1966) is a Guatemalan attorney and politician who served as the 17th vice president of Guatemala from 2020 to 2024.

Castillo was Deputy Minister of Labor from January 2004 to May 2005. He also served as a member of the board of directors of the Bar Association and Notaries of Guatemala. In 2013, he was appointed executive director of the Chamber of Commerce of Guatemala, leaving office in 2018.

== Biography ==
He was born in Huehuetenango, in western Guatemala, on March 17, 1966. He is the son of Enrique Castillo, originally from the municipality of Cuilco, and Reyna Reyes, from Santa Cruz Barillas, both municipalities within the Huehuetenango Department. He studied his primary education at the Salvador Osorio School, the secondary at La Salle College, and graduated as a Teacher at the Alejandro Córdova Mixed Normal Institute.

Later, he moved to Guatemala City to continue his studies as a Lawyer and Notary, graduating from San Carlos's Guatemala University in 1998 and later obtaining a master's degree in Human Rights at the Rafael Landívar University.

== Political career ==
He began in 1986 in the Ministry of Agriculture, in the General Directorate of Agricultural Services (DIGESA). Before 1993, he became involved in the Coordinating Committee of Agricultural, Commercial, Industrial and Financial Associations (CACIF) and acted as a member of the Labor Commission and the Tax Commission of this body in the different representations it had. Subsequently, he was an investigator for the Public Prosecutor's Office, which was still part of the Office of the Attorney General of the Nation from March 1993 to May 1994. Within the Procurator-General of the Nation Office, he was an assistant to the Specific Secretariat from June 1994 to March 1998, when he worked as Acisclo Valladares Molina as Procurator General of the Nation.

In March 1998, he joined the INTECAP – Training Institute as General Secretary and Head of the Department. of International Technical Cooperation until January 2004, when he resigned to join Óscar Berger's cabinet after being appointed First Vice Minister of Labor and Social Welfare, a position he held until May 2005 when he was called to assume the position of General Manager of the INTECAP – Training Institute until April 2009, during these years he met and worked with Alejandro Giammattei who at that time was director of the Penitentiary System, as heads of their respective institutions they had to work together, who would later become the presidential formula.

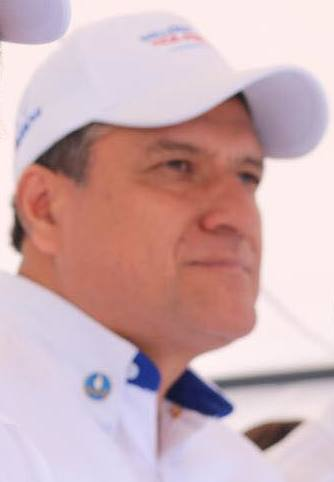
Castillo during the campaign in 2019.

In 2009, he was elected by the Guatemalan Congress as magistrate of the Court of Appeals of the Contentious in the Judicial Branch and served as such until March 2014. He participated in the union elections of the board of directors of the Bar Association and Notaries of Guatemala of the year 2009 as treasurer within the payroll and exercised in the period from 2009 to 2011.

In March 2014, he was appointed Executive Director of the Guatemalan Chamber of Commerce, which is why he resigned from his position in the Judiciary. He left office in 2018 to become involved in the formation of the political party Vamos.

In the National Assembly of Vamos, he was elected candidate for Vice President and running mate of Alejandro Giammattei in 2019.

== Vice presidency ==
On August 11, 2019, he was elected vice president of Guatemala in the second round of presidential elections, along with Alejandro Giammattei as president. "I will be the vice president; I am not a person who is going to be behind the door watching how the president makes decisions, I have my character too," he said after the elections.

Castillo swore to the constitution before the president of the congress and took office on January 14, 2020. Before being vice president, he had not been as well-known within the political sphere. Even so, he was known to engage in dialogue with other candidates during the 2019 elections, including Edmond Mulet, presidential candidate for the Humanist Party, and Carlos Raúl Morales, vice-presidential candidate for UNE, and this was understood as a possible guarantee of dialogue on the part of the new government.

In the first days of Alejandro Giammattei's government, he announced the creation of a Center of Government to "better organize the government and comply with presidential priorities." This caused many politicians, deputies, and journalists to comment that it was an institution with the same functions as the vice presidency since the functions were to organize the government cabinet, which Castillo was in charge of, and they assured that it was a form of exclusion within the government.

Party political offices
| New political party | Vamos nominee for Vice President of Guatemala; 2019 | Succeeded by Luis Suárez Roldán |
Political offices
| Preceded by Jafeth Cabrera | Vice President of Guatemala; 2020–2024 | Succeeded by Karin Herrera |
