= José Luis Chea Urruela =

Guatemalan politician

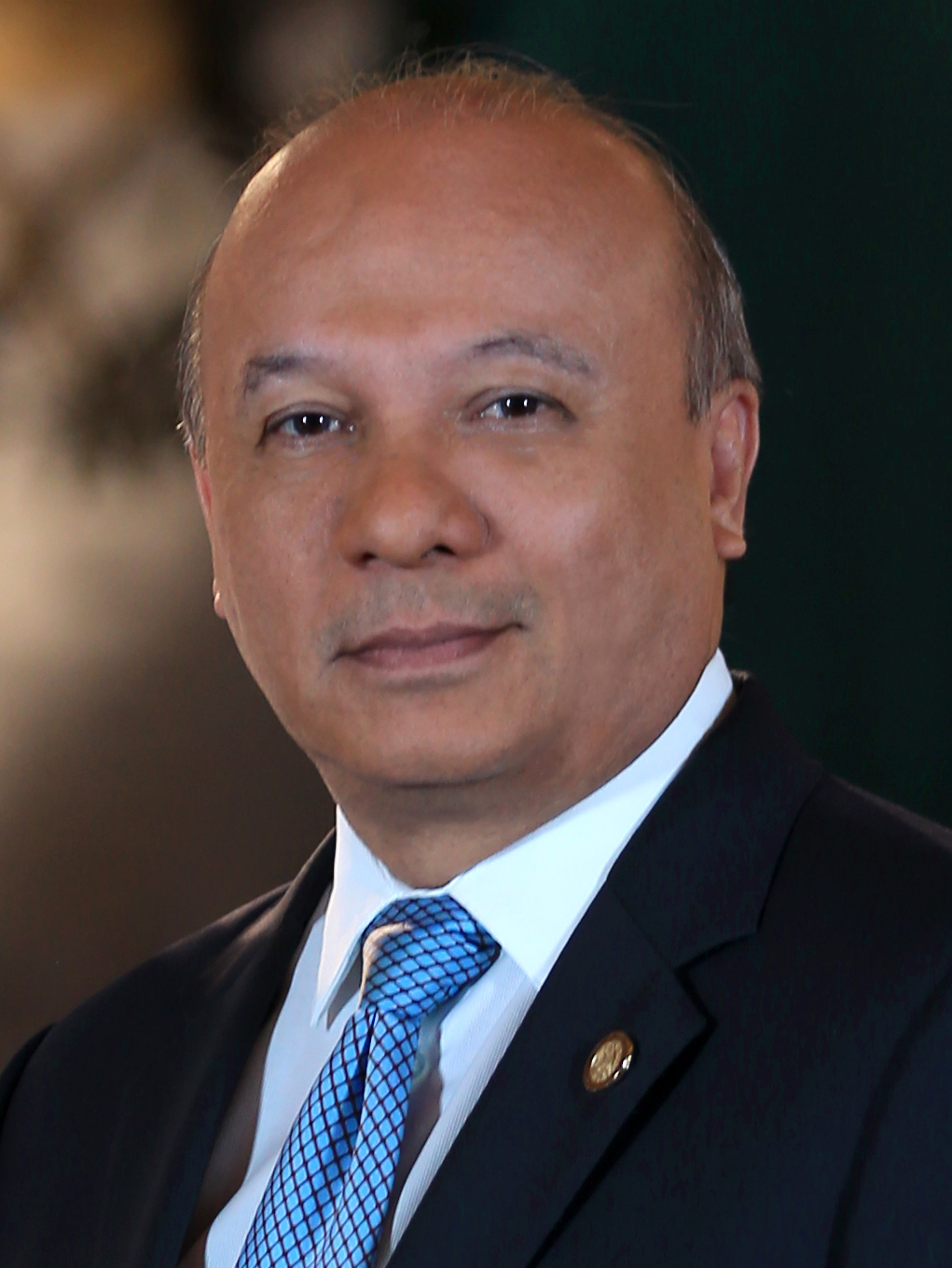

José Luis Chea Urruela is a Guatemalan politician who served as Minister of Culture and Sports from January 2016 to November 2018 under the government of Jimmy Morales.

Chea Urruela graduated from the Xavier Lyceum in Guatemala City in 1971. He subsequently earned a law degree from the Rafael Landívar University in 1978 and a master of international relations from Georgetown University in 1981. He was the Productivity and Work Party candidate in the 2019 Guatemalan general election.
