= 2011 Guatemalan general election =

- Presidential election
11 September 2011 (first round); 6 November 2011 (second round)
- Turnout: 68.86% (first round) ▲8.50pp 60.64% (second round) ▲12.44pp
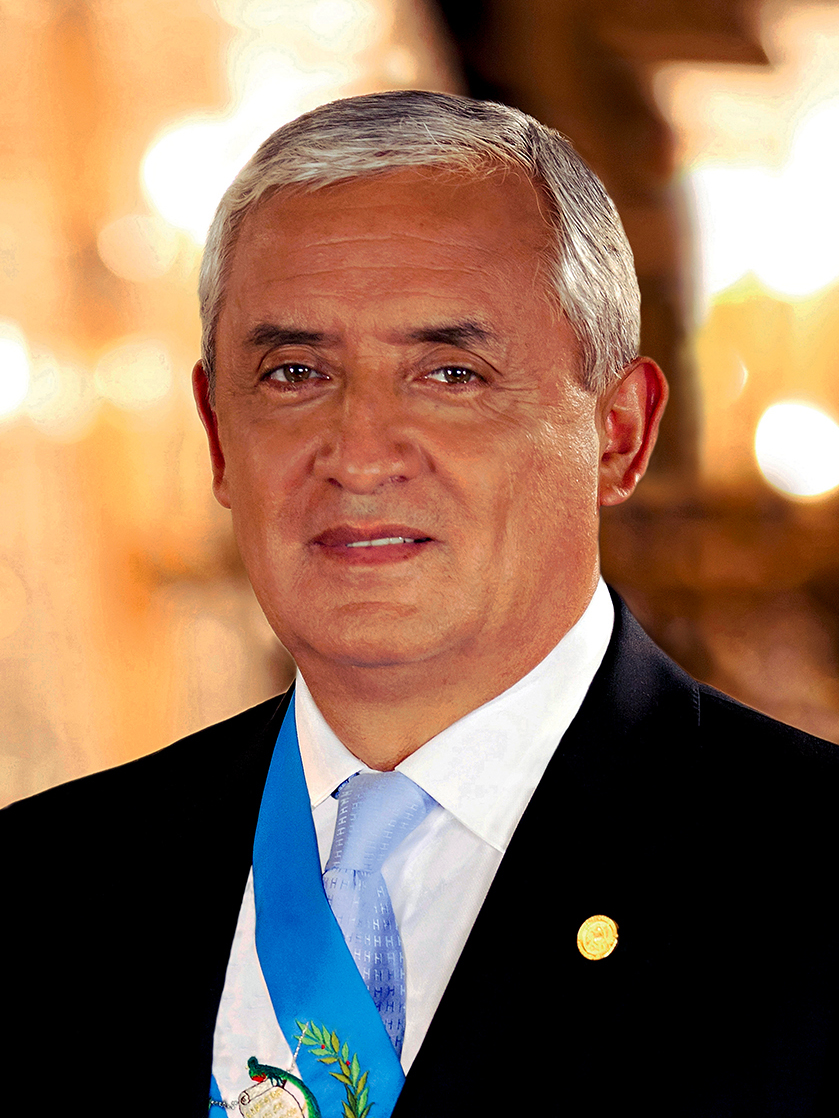

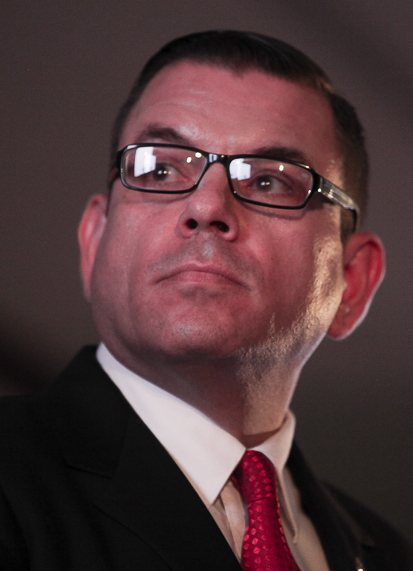
Nominee	Otto Pérez Molina	Manuel Baldizón
Party	PP	LIDER
Running mate	Roxana Baldetti	Raquel Blandón
Popular vote	2,300,979	1,981,003
Percentage	53.74%	46.26%
President before election
Álvaro Colom
UNE
President-elect
Otto Pérez Molina
PP

General elections were held in Guatemala on 11 September 2011 in order to elect the president, vice president, members of Congress, members of the Central American Parliament and mayors and councillors for all municipalities. The Patriotic Party emerged as the largest party in Congress, winning 56 of the 158 seats.

As no candidate received more than 50% of the vote, a second round of the presidential election was held on 6 November with Otto Pérez Molina of the PP facing Manuel Baldizón of Renewed Democratic Liberty. Pérez was elected with 53.7% of the vote.

== Campaign ==
Guatemalan National Revolutionary Unity and other leftist groups ran under the Broad Front of the Left banner, nominating Rigoberta Menchú as their presidential candidate.

Guatemala's high crime rate was a major issue in the campaign as it sits near the Mexican border that is a conduit for drug trafficking.

Baldizon campaigned on the premise of having Guatemala's football team to the World Cup. He also promised to tackle poverty and crime, as well as assure workers an extra month's salary every year. He also said he would reinstate the death penalty and televise executions.

== Opinion polls ==
Polls showed Pérez Molina with a lead over other possible candidates.

A poll for the second round showed Pérez Molina with 49.4% to Baldizón's 39.2%; 11% were undecided. A second poll gave Pérez Molina 39.7% to Baldizón's 32.2%, with 28% undecided. A third poll gave Pérez Molina the lead with 45.7% to Baldizón's 37.2% and 17.1% undecided. A final poll had Pérez Molina ahead with 54.6%, Baldizón at 38.7% and undecided at 5.7%.

Former Foreign Minister Edgar Gutierrez said that "the polling methods are inadequate. They've failed to capture how between 25 and 30 per cent of the people intend to vote."

== Conduct ==
Amongst the observers for the election were Oscar Almengor, who led a team University of San Carlos.

According to Article 186(c) of the Constitution, the relatives of the president cannot participate in the presidential election when the relative holds the presidency. Sandra Torres, former wife of the current president, got divorced to run for the presidency. There were several requests to have a warrant to forbid Sandra Torres from participating in the election. On 9 August 2011, the Constitutional Court upheld a sentence of the Supreme Court preventing Torres from running.

== Results ==
=== President ===
On 6 November, Molina declared victory in the election saying that: "For all the Guatemalans who have put their trust in me, I thank you very much. To those Guatemalans who did not vote for Otto Perez, I make a call to unite and to work together in the next four years, leaving aside party colours." Turnout for the runoff was half that of the first round in some regions.

Candidate	Running mate	Party	First round		Second round	
Candidate	Running mate	Party	Votes	%	Votes	%
Otto Pérez Molina	Roxana Baldetti	Patriotic Party	1,604,472	36.02	2,300,998	53.74
Manuel Baldizón	Raquel Blandón	Renewed Democratic Liberty	1,016,340	22.82	1,981,048	46.26
Eduardo Suger	Laura Reyes	Commitment, Renewal and Order	737,452	16.56		
Mario Estrada	Mauricio Urruela	National Change Union	387,001	8.69		
Harold Caballeros	Efraín Medina	Vision with Values–Encuentro por Guatemala	277,365	6.23		
Rigoberta Menchú	Aníbal García	Broad Front of the Left (Winaq–URNG–MAIZ–ANN)	145,080	3.26		
Juan Gutiérrez	Carlos Zúñiga	National Advancement Party	122,800	2.76		
Patricia Escobar	Álvaro Rodas	Unionist Party	97,498	2.19		
Alejandro Giammattei	Oscar Zamora	Social Action Centre	46,875	1.05		
Adela de Torrebiarte	José de León	National Development Action	19,049	0.43		
Total			4,453,932	100.00	4,282,046	100.00
Valid votes			4,453,932	88.11	4,282,046	96.19
Invalid/blank votes			601,251	11.89	169,440	3.81
Total votes			5,055,183	100.00	4,451,486	100.00
Registered voters/turnout			7,340,841	68.86	7,340,841	60.64
Source: TSE

=== Congress ===
Of 158 congressmen to be elected, 126 congressmen sought re-election but only 56 were re-elected and 102 new congressmen were elected for the first time since democratic election took root in Guatemala. About 65% of MPs were first time representatives, which was the first time this occurred since the 1995 election.

Party	National			District			Total seats	+/–
Party	Votes	%	Seats	Votes	%	Seats	Total seats	+/–
Patriotic Party	1,165,221	26.57	9	1,176,899	26.62	48	57	+27
UNE–GANA	985,610	22.47	8	801,839	18.14	31	39	–
National Change Union	418,175	9.54	3	399,440	9.03	11	14	+10
Renewed Democratic Liberty	387,378	8.83	3	416,880	9.43	11	14	New
Commitment, Renewal and Order	382,730	8.73	3	409,050	9.25	9	12	New
Vision with Values–Encuentro por Guatemala	345,709	7.88	2	244,654	5.53	4	6	+2
Broad Front of the Left (Winaq–URNG-MAIZ–ANN)	143,238	3.27	1	50,307	1.14	0	1	–
National Advancement Party	136,247	3.11	1	148,240	3.35	1	2	–2
Guatemalan Republican Front	120,105	2.74	1	112,604	2.55	0	1	–14
Unionist Party	118,309	2.70	0	138,879	3.14	1	1	–7
Victory	71,588	1.63	0	76,026	1.72	1	1	New
Social Action Centre	48,517	1.11	0	56,623	1.28	0	0	–5
National Development Action	39,160	0.89	0	43,339	0.98	0	0	New
National Convergence Front	23,470	0.54	0	11,576	0.26	0	0	New
National Unity of Hope				201,556	4.56	9	9	–
Guatemalan National Revolutionary Unity				38,458	0.87	1	1	–
Grand National Alliance				37,750	0.85	0	0	–
URNG-MAIZ				23,631	0.53	0	0	–
Vision with Values				13,210	0.30	0	0	–
Winaq–ANN				7,524	0.17	0	0	–
URNG-MAIZ–ANN				6,493	0.15	0	0	–
Winaq				4,324	0.10	0	0	–
Mi Pais				2,043	0.05	0	0	New
Total	4,385,457	100.00	31	4,421,345	100.00	127	158	0
Valid votes	4,385,457	86.59		4,421,345	87.42			
Invalid votes	334,635	6.61		326,896	6.46			
Blank votes	344,277	6.80		309,549	6.12			
Total votes	5,064,369	100.00		5,057,790	100.00			
Registered voters/turnout	7,340,841	68.99		7,340,841	68.90			
Source: TSE, Election Passport
