= Organized Revolution Party =

Organized Revolution Party Partido Revolución Organizada
- Secretary-General: Dulce Alejandra Ávila Barrascout
- Founded: 2017
- Dissolved: 2019
- Ideology: Reformism
- Colors: Gold and black
- Seats in Congress: 0 / 158

Partido Revolución Organizada (lit. Organized Revolution Party) was a political party in formation in Guatemala.

== History ==
The party was established in 2017 by Dulce Alejandra Ávila Barrascout. It has 18,000 affiliates. The first public act was in May 2018. Its formation process ends in 2019, due to this the political party is not qualified to participate in the general elections of 2019.
