= Galdames (surname) =

Galdames (Spanish pronunciation: [ɡalˈdames]) is a Basque habitational surname for one who is from Galdames, a valley and settlement in the Biscay province of the Basque Country in Spain. The Castilianized form of the surname is Galdámez.

== People with the surname Galdames ==
Notable people with the surname include:

- Benjamín Galdames (born 2001), Chilean footballer
- Carlos Galdames (born 1980), Chilean footballer
- José Manuel Galdames (born 1970), retired Spanish footballer
- Luis Galdames Galdames (1881-1941), Chilean lawyer, professor, historian, and politician
- Osvaldo Silva Galdames (1940-2019), Chilean historian and academic
- Pablo Galdames (born 1974), retired Chilean footballer, father of Pablo Galdames Millán
- Pablo Galdames Millán (born 1996), Chilean footballer, son of Pablo Galdames
- René Rojas Galdames (1919–1988), Chilean lawyer and diplomat
- Thomas Galdames (born 1998), Chilean footballer

== People with the surname Galdámez ==
Notable people with the surname include:

- Estuardo Galdámez (born 1966), former Guatemalan politician and presidential candidate
- Josué Galdámez (born 1982), retired Salvadoran footballer
- Mario Albornoz Galdámez (1936-2006), Chilean engineer and academic
