= Luis Velásquez =

Luis Velásquez may refer to:

- Luis Velásquez (runner) (1919–1997), Guatemalan long-distance runner
- Luis Velásquez Quiroa (born 1962), Guatemalan businessman and politician
- Luis Velásquez (footballer) (born 1984), Mexican footballer
- Luis Velásquez Alvaray (1954–2025), Venezuelan politician and lawyer
