= Estuardo Galdámez =

Guatemalan politician

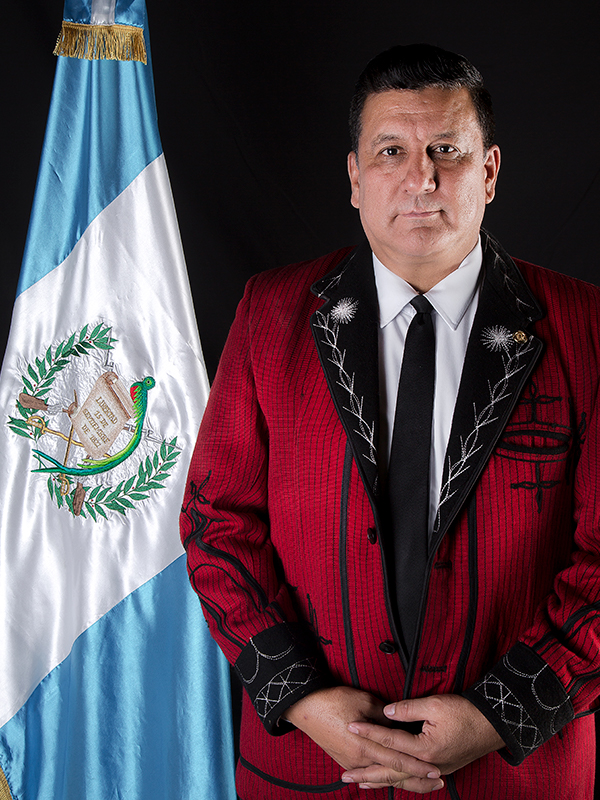

Deputy of the Congress of Guatemala
- In office 14 January 2012 – 14 January 2020

Personal details
- Born: Estuardo Ernesto Galdámez Juárez; February 9, 1966 (age 60) Guatemala
- Party: National Convergence Front (FCN-Nación)
- Occupation: Politician
- Known for: 2019 presidential candidate

Estuardo Ernesto Galdámez Juárez (born 9 February 1966) is a former Guatemalan politician and military officer, and presidential candidate. Galdámez assumed the position of a deputy in the Congress of the Republic of Guatemala on January 14, 2012, and was reelected twice, leaving office on January 14, 2020. He was the then-ruling National Convergence Front (FCN) party's nominee in the 2019 Presidential election. After Galdámez left office, a warrant was issued for his arrest on charges of corruption. He was also stripped of immunity from prosecution, which forced him to miss the special transition session in Congress.
