= Sonia Gutiérrez Raguay =

Guatemalan politician

Sonia Gutiérrez
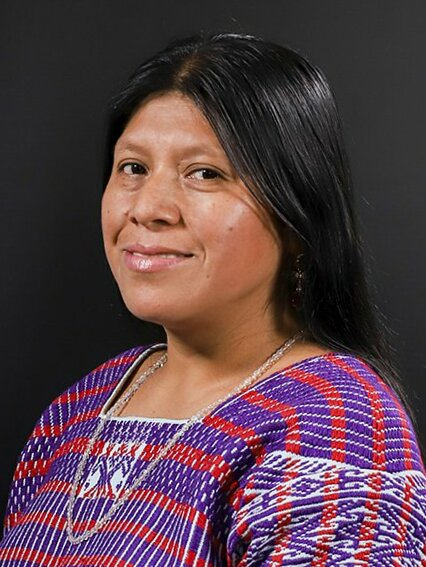
- Official portrait, 2020

Member of the Congress of Guatemala
- Incumbent
- Assumed office 14 January 2020
- Constituency: National List

Personal details
- Born: 5 February 1981 (age 45) Palín, Escuintla
- Party: Winaq

Sonia Gutiérrez Raguay (born 5 February 1981) is a Guatemalan attorney, indigenous human rights activist and politician, who is serving as a member of Congress since January 2020. She has been the Secretary General of the political party Winaq since 2017.
