= Mi Pais (political party) =

- Leader: Luis Rabbé Tejada
- Secretary-General: Alfredo Augusto Rabbé Tejada
- Founded: 2011
- Dissolved: February 27, 2020
- Political position: Right-wing
- Colors: Skyblue

Mi País (lit: My Country) was a political party in Guatemala.

== History ==
Mi País was founded and registered in 2011 and participated in the legislative elections of Guatemala in 2015, it won no seats. The General Secretary of the party is General Alfredo Augusto Rabbé Tejada, brother of former Congress President Luis Rabbé Tejada. The Supreme Electoral Tribunal suspended the party in 2016 for not complying with the imposed economic sanctions.
