= Social Action Centre =

Political party in Guatemala

The Social Action Centre (Centro de Acción Social) was a political party in Guatemala. In the legislative elections held on 9 September 2007, the party secured 4.89% of the votes in the race for national-list deputies and had five seats in the 2008-12 Congress. In the presidential election of the same day, its candidate Eduardo Suger won 7.45% of the popular vote.

In the legislative elections held on September 11, 2011, CASA secured 47,390 votes (1.08% of the total) in the race for national-list deputies and, save for defections, had no representation in the 2012-16 Congress. In the presidential election held on the same day, its candidate Alejandro Giammattei received 46,395 votes (1.04%).

Having failed to secure the minimum of 5% of the popular vote or one seat in Congress, CASA forfeited its registration as a party.
