= Luis Velásquez Quiroa =

Guatemalan politician and economist (born 1962)

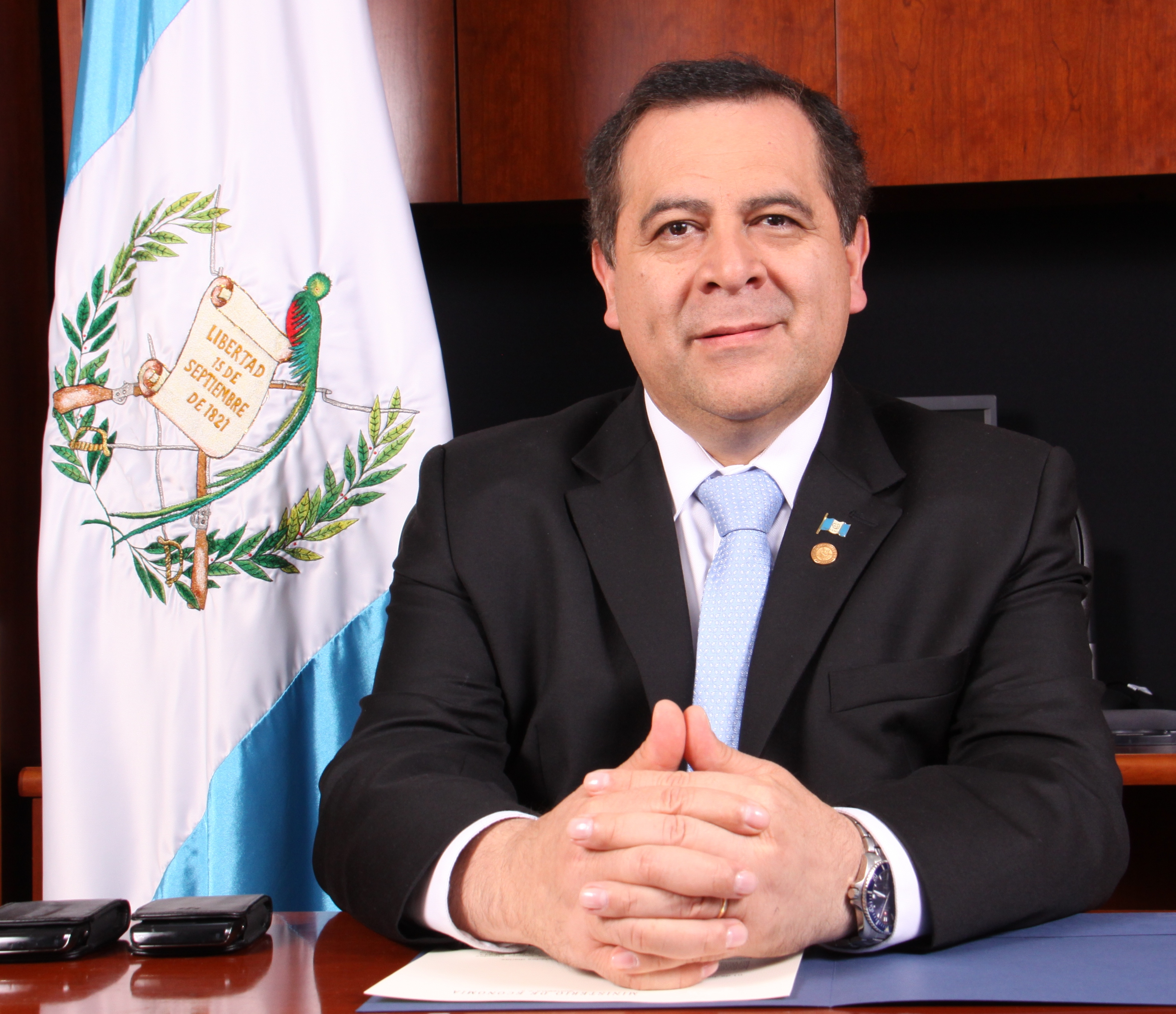

Personal details
- Political party: Unidos
- Spouse: Lourdes Jacqueline Magaña Vega
- Children: 3

Luis Antonio Velásquez Quiroa (born 24 July 1962) is a Guatemalan businessman and former presidential candidate who served as Minister of Economy until January 2012.
