= Xavier Lyceum, Guatemala =

Xavier Lyceum, Guatemala Spanish: Liceo Javier

Location
- Calzada Aguilar Batres 38-51 Zona 12; Villa Nueva; Guatemala
- Coordinates: 14°35′9″N 90°33′44″W

Information
- Type: Private primary and secondary school
- Religious affiliation(s): Catholicism
- Denomination: Jesuits
- Patron saint(s): Francis Xavier
- Established: 1952; 73 years ago
- Founder: Jorge Toruño Lizarralde
- Sister school: San Ignacio Institute
- Director: Claudio Solis
- Grades: Pre-K-12
- Gender: Boys (1952-1999); Co-educational (since 2000)
- Enrollment: 2,000
- Color(s): White and red
- Mascot: Cardinal
- Website: www.liceojavier.edu.gt

Xavier Lyceum (Spanish: Liceo Javier) is a private Catholic preschool, primary and secondary school located in the City of Guatemala. The school was founded by the Society of Jesus in 1952 as a boys only school, and became co-educational in 2000. The school includes preschool through baccalaureate in science and in literature.

== History ==
Xavier Lyceum opened in 1952 with students from kindergarten to third grade, in two small classrooms loaned by the Peyré family to supplement the prestigious private "French school" for young ladies with a school for boys. The founder, Jorge Toruño Lizarralde, entered Guatemala surreptitiously due to the liberal governments of Justo Rufino Barrios and José María Reina Barrios under which Jesuits had been expelled from the country. Toruño initially opened a male section for the French Lyceum. After the overthrow of Colonel Jacobo Arbenz Guzman in 1954 by the National Liberation Movement, private religious education boomed after 1955, and Toruño renamed the school "Xavier Lyceum".

Shortly after 1952, the school moved from 4th Avenue Zone 1 of Guatemala City, "Simeon Canas" Avenue near the North Race Track, and with the help of grants and loans, Toruño bought 17 blocks on the edge of the Calzada Aguilar Bátres, which had been the location of the school since 1957.

In 1956, construction began on the primary building, which was finished in 1957, the year that the school moved permanently to new premises. During the tenure of Orlando Sacasa as rector, a granddaughter of General Justo Rufino Barrios donated $350,000 for the 3-storey secondary building to compensate for expropriations made during the government of Barrios (1873-1885).

=== New century ===
Xavier Lyceum became coeducational in the year 2000. In 2015 it ranked eleventh among 1,592 secondary schools in Guatemala, and second among those with more than 100 students tested.

In 2016 the baccalaureate was awarded to 57 day and 15 night school students. All but two of the 72 graduates scored in the two highest levels on all parts of the standardized exam.

== Notable alumni ==
- Óscar Berger – President of Guatemala, and Mayor of Guatemala City
- Harold Caballeros – Government minister
- Ramiro de León Carpio – President of Guatemala, and human rights procurator
- Alejandro Sinibaldi – National congressional deputy and government minister
- Eduardo Stein – Vice president of Guatemala

== See also ==
- Education in Guatemala
- List of Jesuit schools
