= Vicenta Jerónimo =

Guatemalan politician

Vicenta Jerónimo Jiménez
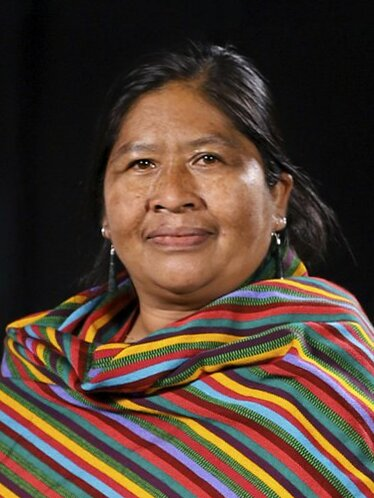
- Official portrait

Member of the Congress of Guatemala
- In office 14 January 2020 – 14 January 2024
- Constituency: National List

Personal details
- Born: 27 October 1972 (age 53) Todos Santos Cuchumatán, Guatemala
- Party: Movement for the Liberation of Peoples
- Children: 2

Vicenta Jerónimo Jiménez (born 27 October 1972) is a Guatemalan Indigenous human rights defender and politician, who served as deputy of the Congress from January 2020 to January 2024. She is a member of the political party, Movement for the Liberation of Peoples.
