= Zury Ríos =

Guatemalan politician

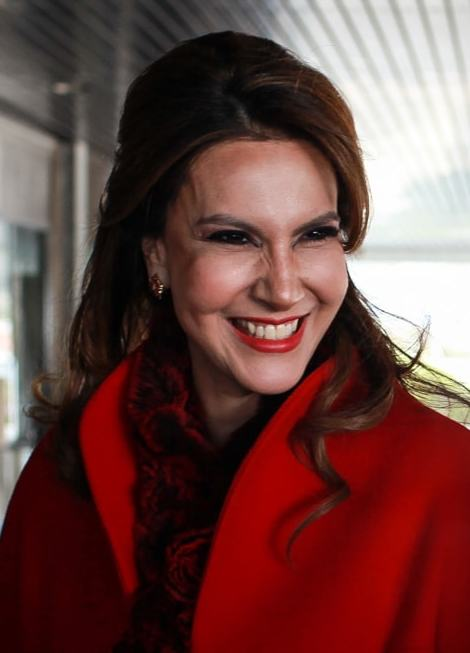
- Ríos in 2019

Second Vice President of the Congress of Guatemala
- In office 14 January 2000 – 14 January 2004
- President: Efraín Ríos Montt
- Preceded by: Rubén Darío Morales Véliz
- Succeeded by: Jorge Méndez Herbruger

Member of the Congress of Guatemala
- In office 14 January 1996 – 14 January 2012
- Constituency: National List

Personal details
- Born: Zury Mayté Ríos Sosa; 24 January 1968 (age 58) Guatemala City, Guatemala
- Party: Valor
- Other political affiliations: Guatemalan Republican; Front (1990–2013)
- Spouses: Jeovanny Chávez (m. 1987, divorced) José García Bravatti (m. 1995, divorced) Roberto López Villatoro (m. 1999, divorced) Jerry Weller (m. 2004, divorced) Gregory Charles Smith (m. 2020)
- Children: 1
- Parents: Efraín Ríos Montt (father); María Teresa Sosa (mother)
- Education: Francisco Marroquín University
- Profession: Lawyer

Zury Mayté Ríos Sosa (born 24 January 1968) is a Guatemalan former politician. She is the daughter of the late general, and President of Guatemala Efraín Ríos Montt.

She began her political career with her father, whom she defended against accusations of genocide against him. She served four terms in Congress, from 1995 to 2012, where she was chair of the Foreign Relations Committee. She also served on the Steering Committee of the Inter-Parliamentary Union (IPU) and was the chair of the IPU's Latin American Group where she was elected unanimously by parliamentarians from the Latin American nations. Zury was the presidential candidate for the party VIVA at the 2015 elections.

== Family and education ==
Zury Ríos Sosa was born in January 1968, the third child of José Efraín Ríos Montt and María Teresa Sosa Ávila. Ríos Sosa's father, a former Guatemalan army general and illegitimate President of Guatemala, was found guilty of genocide against the Ixil Maya and crimes against humanity.

Her brothers, Enrique and Homero, both followed their father's military footsteps and enlisted in the armed forces: Homero, a military doctor, was killed by guerrillas in 1984, while rescuing wounded army soldiers and attempting to put them aboard an army helicopter that was brought down by rebel weapons fire in El Petén; Enrique was chief of the Army General Staff before resigning his commission in September 2003 when charged with having embezzled Q30 million (€3.25m/US$3.75m). When she was 10 years old, her father renounced Catholicism and became an ordained minister in a Guatemalan offshoot of the Gospel Outreach Church.

Zury Ríos studied at schools in Guatemala and Spain, where her father was assigned as military attaché following the 1974 presidential election, a process tainted by accusations of electoral fraud in which he had been a candidate. She graduated magna cum laude in political and social science from Francisco Marroquín University. Her first job (1988–1989) was as a lecturer in social and economic studies at the Escuela Cristiana Verbo in Guatemala City and she has also worked as a primary school teacher.

She has been married four times. Prior to her current union, she was married to Jeovanny Chávez, deputy José García Bravatti, and businessman Roberto López Villatoro. During her marriage to López Villatoro, she was also known as Ríos de López.

On 20 November 2004, at a ceremony held in General Ríos Montt's compound near Antigua Guatemala, and with the general presiding at the ceremony, she married U.S. Congressman Jerry Weller (R-Illinois). Following the wedding, she stated that although she planned to live in the United States with her husband, she would continue serving in the Guatemalan legislature; a lawyer for Weller told the U.S. House Ethics Committee that she did not plan on becoming a U.S. citizen.

In March 2006 the Wellers announced that she was pregnant, and a daughter, Marizú Catherine, was born on 17 August 2006 in a Guatemala City hospital. The child holds dual U.S. and Guatemalan nationality.

== Political career ==
In 1989, Zury Ríos joined the public relations department of the newly created Guatemalan Republican Front (FRG) in preparation for the 1990 presidential election. In that election, the FRG won 10 seats in Congress. However, her father was barred from running for president due to a provision in the constitution barring coup leaders from running. Following the election, Zury Ríos worked as an administrative assistant to the FRG congressional bloc and as private secretary to the Speaker of Congress.

In 1996 she was elected to Congress as a national list deputy. In 1998 she was elected to the FRG's executive committee and political council.

In 1999 she was re-elected to Congress, again from her party's national list. During the 2000–04 legislative session, she served as one of the two deputy speakers and on the congressional foreign relations committee. She was elected to a third term in the 2003 general election, receiving the second highest number of votes on the national electoral lists. During the 2004–08 legislature, she served as vice chair of the foreign relations committee and on the health, sport, social welfare, and ethics committees. Much of her congressional work has focused on reproductive health issues, the HIV-AIDS situation, and combating tobacco use; some of her supporters see her as a potential future foreign minister or even president of the Republic.

In 2003, prior to the election, Zury Ríos was accused of being one of the organizers of jueves negro ("Black Thursday"). In mid-2003, the FRG was again trying to get General Ríos Montt on to the presidential ticket by arguing that applying the constitutional ban preventing former coup leaders from seeking the presidency should not apply to him in accordance with the principle of non-retroactive application of the law. His 1982 coup d'état had preceded the enactment of the 1985 Constitution. After a series of court decisions ruling alternately that he could or could not run, culminating with a 21 July 2003 ruling by the Supreme Court suspending his candidacy, on Thursday, 24 July, FRG officials and supporters led a mass demonstration in Guatemala City to protest his disqualification. The demonstration degenerated into a bloody riot that left one man dead (journalist Héctor Fernando Ramírez) but was perceived as having been successful in forcing the decision to be made to put Ríos Montt's name on the presidential ballot since a week later, the Constitutional Court of Guatemala overturned the Supreme Court's ban.

Although General Ríos Montt ultimately lost the November 2003 election, he enjoyed his daughter's full support. Zury Ríos accompanied her father on his campaign trail, generally introducing him, in highly favorable terms, before he addressed his rallies. She was quoted in the press as saying, "my father is my inspiration."

She ran for president in 2015, finishing fifth with 5.9% of the vote. Her candidacy for the 2019 presidential election was rejected due to a ban, since repealed, on former dictators and their close relatives running for the presidency. She competed at the presidential elections again in 2023, as one of the favourites for the election due to her status as an opposition figure to the highly unpopular President Alejandro Giammattei, elected in 2019. However, despite initially polling well, leading most opinion polls with 20-25% of responses until April 2023, she ended up in sixth place with an underwhelming 8.69% of the votes.

== Political positions ==
Ríos claims her father's political legacy. She is popular with the conservative evangelical electorate and has the support of the army and big business.

She promises a particularly aggressive security policy against gangs and social organisations involved in conflicts with landowners.

She also advocates the implementation of policies expected by conservative evangelicals on issues such as abortion.

She defended the dissolution of the International Commission against Impunity in Guatemala (CICIG), which was investigating corruption in the political class.
