= 2019 Guatemalan general election =

- Opinion polls
- Presidential election
- 16 June 2019 (first round); 11 August 2019 (second round)
- Turnout: 61.84% (first round) ▼7.90pp 42.66% (second round) ▼13.49pp
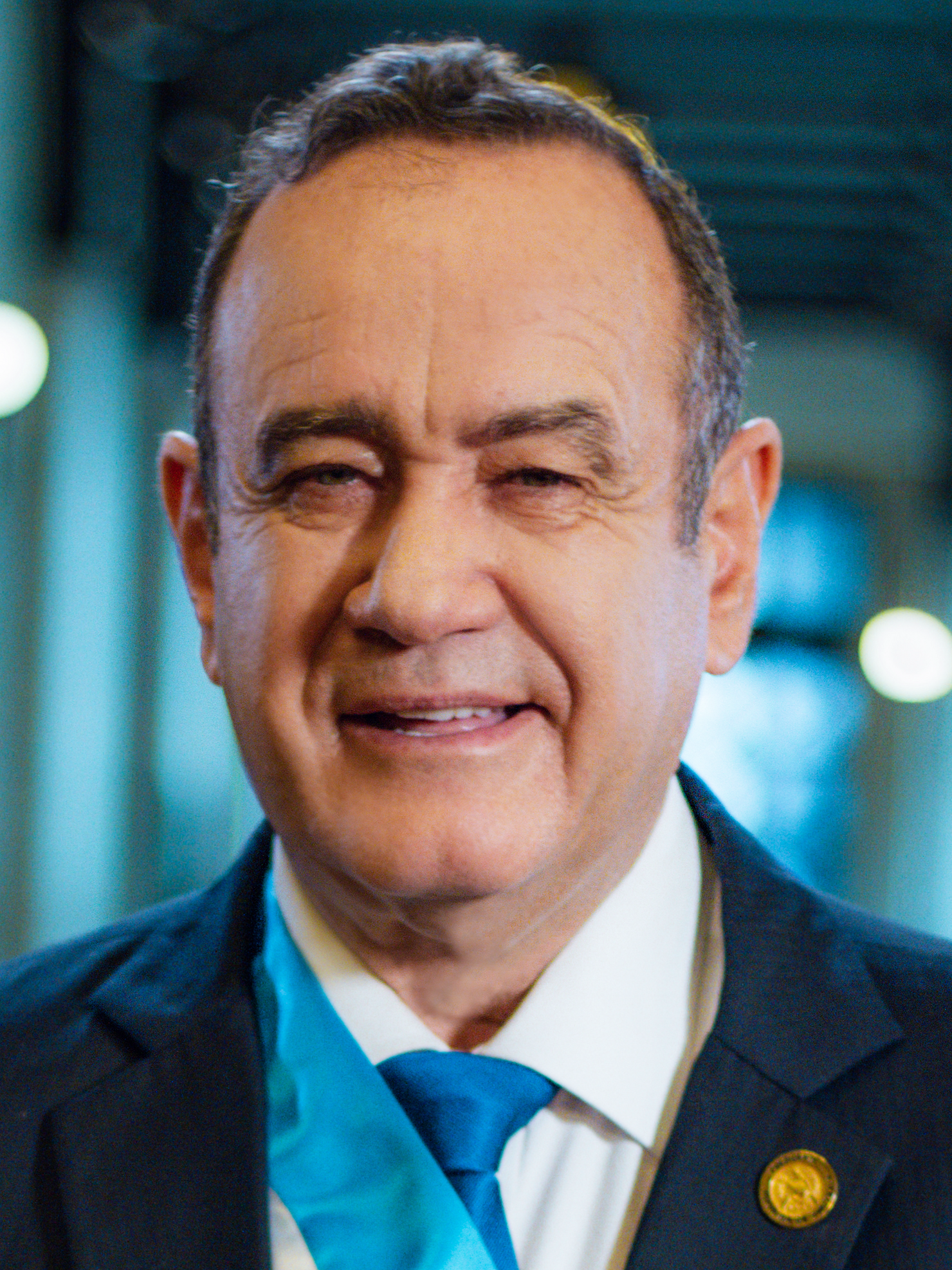

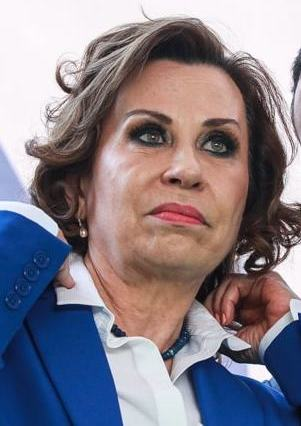
Nominee	Alejandro Giammattei	Sandra Torres
Party	Vamos	UNE
Running mate	Guillermo Castillo	Carlos Raúl Morales
Popular vote	1,907,767	1,384,044
Percentage	57.95%	42.05%
President before election
Jimmy Morales
FCN
Elected President
Alejandro Giammattei
Vamos
- Legislative election
- All 160 seats in Congress; 81 seats needed for a majority
Party	Leader	Vote %	Seats	+/–
UNE	Orlando Blanco	17.81	52	+24
Vamos	Carlos Roberto Calderón	7.97	17	New
UCN	Julio Lainfiesta	5.44	12	+6
Valor	Luis Alfonso Rosales	4.56	9	New
BIEN	Evelyn Morataya	4.82	8	+8
FCN	Javier Hernández	5.22	8	−27
Semilla	Lucrecia Hernández Mack	5.26	7	New
Todos	Felipe Alejos	4.40	7	−9
VIVA	Armando Castillo	4.70	7	+3
CREO	Adela de Torrebiarte	4.41	6	+1
PHG	Lecsan Mérida	4.67	6	New
Winaq	Sonia Gutiérrez	3.51	4	+3
Victoria	Juan Carlos Rivera	2.52	4	+4
PC	Jorge García Silva	3.27	3	New
Unionist	Álvaro Arzú Escobar	2.94	3	+2
URNG	Osmundo Ponce Serrano	2.78	3	+2
PAN	Manuel Conde Orellana	2.73	2	−1
MLP	Vicenta Jerónimo	3.02	1	New
Podemos	Ronald Sierra	1.68	1	−11
This lists parties that won seats. See the complete results below.
Results by department
President of the Congress before	President of the Congress after
Álvaro Arzú Escobar; Unionist	Allan Rodríguez; Vamos

General elections were held in Guatemala on 16 June 2019, to elect the president, Congress and local councils. A second round of the presidential elections was held on 11 August 2019, since no candidate won a majority in the first round. Alejandro Giammattei won the election in the second round of voting.

Incumbent President Jimmy Morales was constitutionally barred from running for a second four-year term.

== Electoral system ==
The president of Guatemala is elected using the two-round system.

The 160 members of Congress are elected by two methods; 130 are elected from 22 multi-member constituencies based on the departments, with the remaining 31 elected from a single nationwide constituency. Seats are elected using closed list proportional representation, with seats allocated using the D'Hondt method.

== Candidates ==
Thelma Aldana's candidature was rejected by authorities in April 2019 on the grounds of alleged corruption cases concerning her, although no evidence was presented. She denied the accusations and attributes them to what she calls the "pact of the corrupt", composed of politicians and business leaders of the country. As former attorney general, she had uncovered several major corruption cases. Aldana appealed the ruling, but the appeal was rejected in May 2019.

The candidature of Zury Ríos, daughter of Guatemalan dictator from 1982 to 1983 Efraín Ríos Montt, was rejected by authorities in May 2019 on the grounds that the country's constitution bars close relatives of coup leaders from serving as president.

In April 2019, centre-right candidate Mario Estrada was arrested. He is accused by the American authorities of having made a deal with the Sinaloa cartel, from which he allegedly obtained between 10 and 12 million dollars for his election campaign, and of having ordered the murder of rival candidates.

Party	Presidential candidate	Vice presidential candidate
PAN–P	Roberto Arzú	José Antonio Farias
Todos	Fredy Cabrera	Ricardo Sagastume
MLP	Thelma Cabrera	Neftalí López
URNG	Pablo Ceto	Blanca Estela Colop
PPT	José Luis Chea	Guillermo González
PU	Pablo Duarte	Roberto Villeda
CREO	Julio Héctor Estrada	Yara Argueta
VIVA	Isaac Farchi Sultán	Ricardo Flores Asturias
FCN	Estuardo Galdámez	Betty Marroquín Silva
Libre	Aníbal García	Carlos Pérez
Vamos	Alejandro Giammattei	Guillermo Castillo
EG	Manfredo Marroquín	Oscar Adolfo Morales
C	Benito Morales	Claudia Mariana Valiente
PHG	Edmond Mulet	Jorge Pérez
Victoria	Amílcar Rivera	Erico Can Saquic
Avanza	Danilo Roca Barillas	Manuel Martínez
UNE	Sandra Torres	Carlos Raúl Morales
Unidos	Luis Velásquez Quiroga	Arturo Soto
Winaq	Manuel Villacorta	Izabel Hernández

=== Declined candidates ===
- Manuel Baldizón: deputy of the Congress 2004-2008, secretary-general of Renewed Democratic Liberty 2010-2014, presidential candidate in 2011 and 2015.
- Ernest Steve "Neto" Bran: Mayor of Mixco since 2016.
- Jorge Pérez: Secretary of Executive Coordination of the Presidency 2000-2002.
- Erik Súñiga: Mayor of Ayutla, San Marcos, 2008-2020.
- Nineth Montenegro: Deputy of the Congress by National List since 1996, Second Vice President of the Congress 2012-2013, General Secretary of the Encuentro de Guatemala since 2007.

== Opinion polls ==
=== First round ===
View source data.

=== Second round ===
View source data.

== Debates ==
2019 Guatemalan general election debates
Date	Organisers	Moderator(s)	P Present P Present but his candidacy was revoked NI Non-invitee A Absent invitee					
Date	Organisers	Moderator(s)	Arzú PAN–P	Escobar PC	Estrada CREO	Giammattei Vamos	Mulet PHG	Torres UNE
2 June	AGG	Luis Felipe Valenzuela; Marielos Fuentes	P	P	P	P	P	A
28 July	AGG	Luis Felipe Valenzuela; Marielos Fuentes				P		A

== Results ==
=== President ===
Candidate	Running mate	Party	First round		Second round	
Candidate	Running mate	Party	Votes	%	Votes	%
Sandra Torres	Carlos Raúl Morales	National Unity of Hope	1,112,939	25.42	1,384,044	42.05
Alejandro Giammattei	Guillermo Castillo Reyes	Vamos	608,083	13.89	1,907,767	57.95
Edmond Mulet	Jorge Pérez	Humanist Party of Guatemala	493,710	11.28		
Thelma Cabrera	Neftalí López	Movement for the Liberation of Peoples	452,260	10.33		
Roberto Arzú	José Antonio Farias	National Advancement Party–Podemos	267,049	6.10		
Isaac Farchi	Ricardo Flores Asturias	Vision with Values	259,616	5.93		
Manuel Villacorta	Izabel Hernández	Winaq	229,362	5.24		
Estuardo Galdámez	Betty Marroquín Silva	National Convergence Front	180,414	4.12		
Julio Héctor Estrada	Yara Argueta	Commitment, Renewal and Order	165,031	3.77		
Fredy Cabrera	Ricardo Sagastume	Todos	138,333	3.16		
Amílcar Rivera	Erico Can Saquic	Victory	111,998	2.56		
Pablo Ceto	Blanca Estela Colop	Guatemalan National Revolutionary Unity	94,531	2.16		
Pablo Duarte	Roberto Villeda	Unionist Party	62,679	1.43		
Manfredo Marroquín	Oscar Adolfo Morales	Encuentro por Guatemala	50,594	1.16		
Aníbal García	Carlos Pérez	Libre	41,800	0.95		
Benito Morales	Claudia Mariana Valiente	Convergence	37,579	0.86		
Luis Velásquez Quiroa	Arturo Soto	Unidos	26,921	0.61		
José Luis Chea Urruela	Mario Guillermo González	Productivity and Work Party	23,962	0.55		
Danilo Roca	Manuel Martínez	Avanza	21,410	0.49		
Total			4,378,271	100.00	3,291,811	100.00
Valid votes			4,378,271	86.86	3,291,811	94.68
Invalid votes			209,444	4.16	151,047	4.34
Blank votes			452,708	8.98	33,900	0.98
Total votes			5,040,423	100.00	3,476,758	100.00
Registered voters/turnout			8,150,221	61.84	8,150,221	42.66
Source: TSE

=== Congress ===
Party	National			District			Total seats	+/–
Party	Votes	%	Seats	Votes	%	Seats	Total seats	+/–
National Unity of Hope	717,204	17.81	7	731,015	17.43	47	54	+26
Vamos	320,939	7.97	3	331,810	7.91	13	16	New
National Change Union	218,914	5.44	2	243,757	5.81	10	12	+6
Semilla	211,691	5.26	2	215,669	5.14	5	7	New
National Convergence Front	210,307	5.22	2	227,144	5.42	6	8	–27
Bienestar Nacional	194,067	4.82	2	209,206	4.99	6	8	+8
Vision with Values	189,467	4.70	2	181,588	4.33	5	7	+3
Humanist Party of Guatemala	188,234	4.67	2	186,776	4.45	4	6	New
Valor	183,814	4.56	1	215,338	5.14	8	9	New
Commitment, Renewal and Order	177,681	4.41	1	189,654	4.52	5	6	+1
Todos	177,182	4.40	1	205,144	4.89	6	7	–9
Winaq	141,252	3.51	1	144,314	3.44	3	4	+3
Citizen Prosperity	131,694	3.27	1	152,540	3.64	2	3	New
Movement for the Liberation of Peoples	121,743	3.02	1	123,084	2.94	0	1	New
Unionist Party	118,337	2.94	1	109,736	2.62	2	3	+2
Guatemalan National Revolutionary Unity	112,037	2.78	1	116,943	2.79	2	3	+2
National Advancement Party	110,016	2.73	1	104,900	2.50	1	2	–1
Victory	101,418	2.52	1	71,630	1.71	2	3	+3
Fuerza	77,862	1.93	0	99,090	2.36	0	0	–1
Encuentro por Guatemala	71,668	1.78	0	66,250	1.58	0	0	–6
Podemos	67,610	1.68	0	77,756	1.85	1	1	–11
Convergence	49,284	1.22	0	51,024	1.22	0	0	–3
Libre	48,267	1.20	0	51,518	1.23	0	0	New
Avanza	31,750	0.79	0	24,735	0.59	0	0	New
Productivity and Work Party	29,729	0.74	0	30,656	0.73	0	0	New
Unidos	25,258	0.63	0	32,111	0.77	0	0	New
Total	4,027,425	100.00	32	4,193,388	100.00	128	160	+2
Valid votes	4,027,425	79.72						
Invalid/blank votes	1,024,405	20.28						
Total votes	5,051,830	100.00						
Registered voters/turnout	8,150,221	61.98						
Source: TSE, TSE, IPU

=== Central American Parliament ===
Party	Votes	%	Seats	+/–
National Unity of Hope	626,821	18.84	5	+1
Vamos	297,042	8.93	2	New
National Change Union	226,732	6.81	2	+1
National Convergence Front	213,392	6.41	2	–
Valor	178,587	5.37	1	New
Bienestar Nacional	174,465	5.24	1	+1
Todos	172,170	5.17	1	–1
Commitment, Renewal and Order	165,832	4.98	1	+1
Vision with Values	161,474	4.85	1	–
Citizen Prosperity	136,204	4.09	1	New
Winaq	115,425	3.47	1	+1
Semilla	108,731	3.27	1	New
Guatemalan National Revolutionary Unity	106,373	3.20	1	–
Victory	100,789	3.03	0	New
National Advancement Party	99,730	3.00	0	–
Unionist Party	92,968	2.79	0	–1
Fuerza	81,762	2.46	0	–
Podemos	64,905	1.95	0	–
Encuentro por Guatemala	56,943	1.71	0	–1
Convergence	49,595	1.49	0	–
Avanza	34,211	1.03	0	New
Libre	41,671	1.25	0	New
Unidos	21,822	0.66	0	New
Total	3,327,644	100.00	20	+2
Valid votes	3,327,644	65.97		
Invalid/blank votes	1,716,408	34.03		
Total votes	5,044,052	100.00		
Registered voters/turnout	8,086,526	62.38		
Source: Supreme Electoral Tribunal

=== Municipal ===
Party	C.	M.	%	±
National Advancement Party	41			
Valor	156			New
Todos	161			
Podemos	76	2		
Guatemalan National Revolutionary Unity	75	5		
National Unity of Hope	314	109		
Unionist Party	111			
Bienestar Nacional	130			
National Change Union	206			
Encuentro por Guatemala	58			
Vision with Values	115			
National Convergence Front	205			
Convergence	57			
Commitment, Renewal and Order	132			
Victoria	59			
Winaq	54			
Fuerza	152			
Unidos	44			New
Productivity and Work Party	36			New
Vamos	255			New
Avanza	47			New
Humanist Party of Guatemala	123			New
Movement for the Liberation of Peoples	109			New
Citizen Prosperity	120			New
Semilla	143	3		New
Libre	69			New
Civic committees	121			–
Total	3,169	340	100	0
Source: Supreme Electoral Tribunal
