= Edmond Mulet =

Guatemalan politician

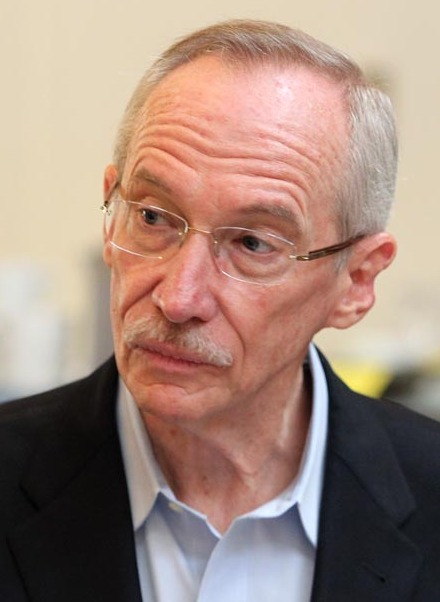
- Mulet in 2015

President of the Congress of Guatemala
- In office 13 January 1992 – 13 January 1993
- Preceded by: Catalina Soberanis
- Succeeded by: José Lobo Dubón

Personal details
- Born: 13 March 1951 (age 75)
- Party: Cabal (since 2020)
- Other political affiliations: Humanist Party of Guatemala (2017–2020); National Centre Union (1985–2000)
- Profession: Diplomat
- Website: MINUSTAH Leadership

Edmond Auguste Mulet Lesieur (born 13 March 1951) is a Guatemalan diplomat, lawyer and notary public. He was appointed Head of the independent three-member panel to lead the Organisation for the Prohibition of Chemical Weapons (OPCW)-United Nations Joint Investigative Mechanism on 27 April 2017. Mulet served as the last Chief of Staff to United Nations Secretary-General Ban Ki-moon. Previously, he was Assistant Secretary-General for Peacekeeping Operations at the United Nations. He was appointed to this position on 2 June 2011. He was the Special Representative of the Secretary-General and head of mission of MINUSTAH, having assumed the functions of acting head of mission in the immediate aftermath of the 2010 Haiti earthquake, in which the previous head of mission, Hédi Annabi of Tunisia, perished, along with his deputy Luiz Carlos da Costa of Brazil, and the acting police commissioner, RCMP Supt. Doug Coates of Canada, when the mission's headquarters in Port-au-Prince collapsed.

Mulet served a previous term in this position between June 2006 and August 2007.

Immediately prior to taking up his post, he was United Nations Assistant Secretary-General for Peacekeeping Operations. Prior to this, he was Guatemala's ambassador to the European Union, the Kingdom of Belgium and the Grand Duchy of Luxembourg, where he represented his country in the preparatory negotiations for free trade agreements between Latin America and the Caribbean and the European Union.

He was a presidential candidate in both the 2019 and the 2023 Guatemalan general elections.

== Personal life ==
Mulet received his primary education in Guatemala City, Montreal, New York City and Bern. He studied law and social studies at Guatemala City's Universidad Mariano Gálvez. He is married and has two sons. He is fluent in Spanish, English and French.

== Career ==
During the 1980s, Mulet was accused of belonging to an illegal adoption ring that facilitated the departure of babies from the country, posing as tourists. In 1981, he was arrested for falsifying adoption paperwork but the charges were later dropped. In 1984, Mulet was again investigated for falsifying adoption paperwork, but no charges were filed against him.

Mulet was first elected to Congress in 1982. He was a candidate to the 1984 National Constituent Assembly, and was re-elected to Congress for the period 1986–1991. In 1990, he was re-elected for the period 1991–1996. During his years in Congress, he was involved in the Central American peace process, the Esquipulas Accords, and the Guatemalan Peace negotiations. He was also a member of the Guatemalan-Belize Commission, first as a representative of Congress and later as a delegate from the executive branch. In 1992 he became President of Congress.

In 1993, he was appointed Ambassador to the United States, a post from which he resigned following the self-coup of President Jorge Serrano Elías in 1993. Following the restoration of democratic rule, Mulet resumed his functions until 1996. During those years, he was a regular lecturer at think-tanks, universities and colleges across the Americas, and at the Foreign Service Institute in Washington, D.C. Upon his return to Guatemala in 1996, he was elected general secretary of the Unión del Centro Nacional party.

Mulet served as the United Nations Special Representative for Haiti from 2005 to 2007.

In 2007, Mulet was appointed as Assistant Secretary-General for Peacekeeping Operations, a post he held from 2007 to 2010 and again from 2011 to 2015.

On 31 March 2010, Mulet was appointed by the United Nations Secretary-General Ban Ki-moon as his Special Representative and Head of the United Nations Stabilization Mission in Haiti (MINUSTAH). He succeeded late Hédi Annabi of Tunisia, who perished in the 2010 Haiti earthquake.

He was a presidential candidate in the 2019 general election, obtaining 11% of the vote in the first round. Defining himself as centrist, he opposed the legalization of marriage for same-sex couples and the right to abortion.

He was also a presidential candidate in the 2023 general election. He promised to build a high-security prison and to raise police salaries. He also said that Guatemala was moving towards a more authoritarian style of governance.
