= Avanza (Guatemala) =

Advance Avanza
- Secretary-General: Mario Antonio Guerra Leon
- Founded: May 17, 2018
- Legalised: July 2018
- Dissolved: August 2019
- Political position: Right-wing
- Colors: Magenta
- Seats in Congress: 0 / 158

Avanza (lit. Advance) was a political party in Guatemala.

== History ==
Avanza is a political party that started on May 18, 2016 the political party was registered by the Supreme Electoral Tribunal, and its registration process ended on May 17, 2018. It currently has 29,000 members, its general secretary is Mario Antonio Guerra Leon, candidate for deputy for Heart New Nation in 2015. Avanza was made official in July 2018 as a political party and is qualified to participate in the 2019 general elections.

== Electoral history ==
=== Presidential elections ===
Election date	Party candidate	Number of votes	Percentage of votes	Number of votes	Percentage of votes	Result
Election date	Party candidate	First round		Second round		Result
2019	Danilo Roca Barillas	21,012	0.42%	—	—	Lost

=== Legislative elections ===
Election	Votes	%	Seats	+/–	Status
2019	31,750	0.79 (#24)	0 / 160	New	Extra-parliamentary
