= Victory (political party) =

Guatemalan political party

Victory Victoria
- Leader: Amílcar Rivera
- Founded: 2008
- Ideology: Christian politics
- Political position: Right-wing
- Colors: Red and blue
- Congress: 3 / 160

Website
- partidovictoria.com

Victory (Spanish: Victoria) is a political party in Guatemala.

== History ==
The party was established in 2008. It contested the 2011 general elections, although it did not nominate a presidential candidate. In the Congressional elections the party received 1.6% of the vote, winning one of the 158 seats. Prior to the 2015 elections it joined an alliance with Todos and the Unionist Party.

== Election results ==
=== President ===
Election	Candidates		First round		Second round		Status
Election	President	Vice President	Votes	%	Votes	%	Status
2011	Did not participate						
2015	Did not participate						
2019	Amílcar Rivera	Erico Can	111,998	2.56 (#11)	—N/a	—N/a	Lost
2023	Amílcar Rivera	Fernando Mazariegos	135,591	3.23 (#9)	—N/a	—N/a	Lost

=== Congress ===
Election	Votes	%	Seats	+/–	Status
2011	71,588	1.63 (#11)	1 / 158	New	Opposition
2015	Did not participate; Victory candidates ran as part of LIDER				
2019	101,418	2.52 (#18)	3 / 160	▲3	Opposition
2023	124,946	3.00 (#11)	3 / 160	Steady	External support
