= Renewed Democratic Liberty =

Renewed Democratic Liberty Libertad Democrática Renovada
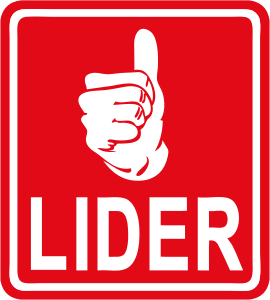
- Secretary-General: Roberto Villarte
- Spokesperson: Mario Yanes
- Founded: November 25, 2010; 15 years ago
- Dissolved: February 16, 2016; 10 years ago
- Split from: National Unity of Hope
- Headquarters: 13 calle 2-52 zona 1, Guatemala City
- Youth wing: Joven LIDER
- Ideology: Conservatism; Populism
- Political position: Centre-right
- Regional affiliation: Center-Democratic Integration Group

Website
- www.baldizon.com

Renewed Democratic Liberty (Spanish: Libertad Democrática Renovada, LIDER, sometimes also translated as Democratic Freedom Revival or Renewed Democratic Liberation) was a centre-right political party in Guatemala.

It was founded as a parliamentary group by defectors from the then governing National Unity of Hope party of President Álvaro Colom in 2008. It was officially registered as a political party in 2010. At the end of the 2007-2011 legislature, the Independent Renewed Democratic Liberty parliamentary bloc included 25 out of the 158 deputies in the Congress of the Republic, where it formed a parliamentary alliance with the conservative Grand National Alliance (GANA).

On July 25, 2016 the party was cancelled by the Supreme Electoral Court due to constant breaking of the Electoral and Political Parties Law.

== History ==
For the 2011 presidential election and the 2015 Guatemalan election, the party's secretary-general and candidate was Manuel Baldizón.

In the 2011 election, Baldizón polled in second place in both the first round and second round of the election, with 23 percent and 46 percent of the votes cast, respectively.

In the 2015 election, he polled in third place, with 19.6 percent of the votes cast, and thus did not go onto the runoff election to select the president.

According to Insight Crime, the Renewed Democratic Liberty has strong ties with groups of drug traffickers.

=== 2011 legislative election ===
In the September 11, 2011 Legislative Election, LIDER won 8.9% of the vote and 14 seats in Congress. Presidential Candidate Manuel Baldizón placed second in the Presidential Race with 23.2% of the votes (1,038,287 votes), eventually losing in the November 6 run-off to conservative Otto Pérez Molina of the Patriotic Party (PP). Baldizón got 1,981,003 votes or 46.26% of the votes.
