= Libre (Guatemala) =

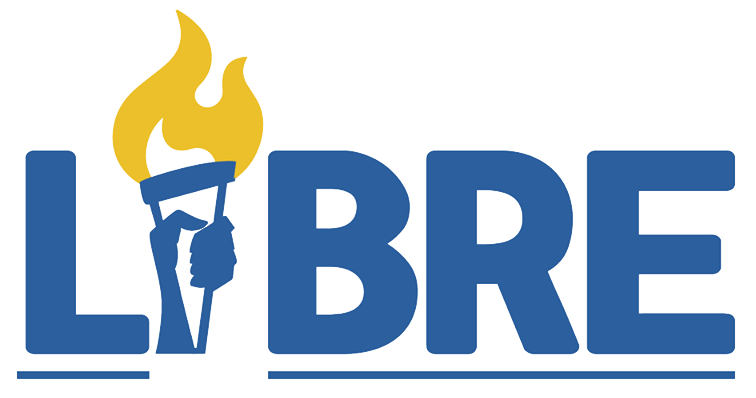
- Leader: Aníbal García
- Secretary-General: Carlos René Maldonado Alonzo
- Founded: May 17, 2018
- Legalised: December 13, 2018
- Dissolved: February 27, 2020
- Split from: Movimiento Nueva República
- Ideology: Progressivism
- Political position: Left-wing
- Colors: Blue
- Seats in Congress: 0 / 158

Libre (lit. Free) was a political party in Guatemala.

== History ==
Libre is a political party in formation, on September 18, 2016, the political party was registered by the Supreme Electoral Tribunal, and its registration process ended on December 13, 2018. It currently has 17,700 members, its general secretary is Carlos René Maldonado Alonzo. Its leader is Aníbal García, former general secretary of the New Republic Movement party and former presidential candidate in 2015, and vice president in 2011. The movement has had rapprochement with former attorney general Thelma Aldana to explore a possible coalition with Encuentro por Guatemala and Semilla for apply for Aldana to the presidency in 2019. In September 2018, the political organization concluded the requirements and was made official as a political party in the same month.

== Electoral history ==
=== Presidential elections ===
| Election date | Party candidate | Number of votes | Percentage of votes | Number of votes | Percentage of votes | Result |
| Election date | Party candidate | First round | | Second round | | Result |
|---|---|---|---|---|---|---|
| 2019 | Aníbal García | 41,115 | 0.95 | — | — | Lost |

=== Legislative elections ===
| Election | Votes | % | Seats | +/– | Status |
|---|---|---|---|---|---|
| 2019 | 48,267 | 1.20 (#23) | 0 / 160 | New | Extra-parliamentary |
