= National Convergence Front =

National Convergence Front Frente de Convergencia Nacional
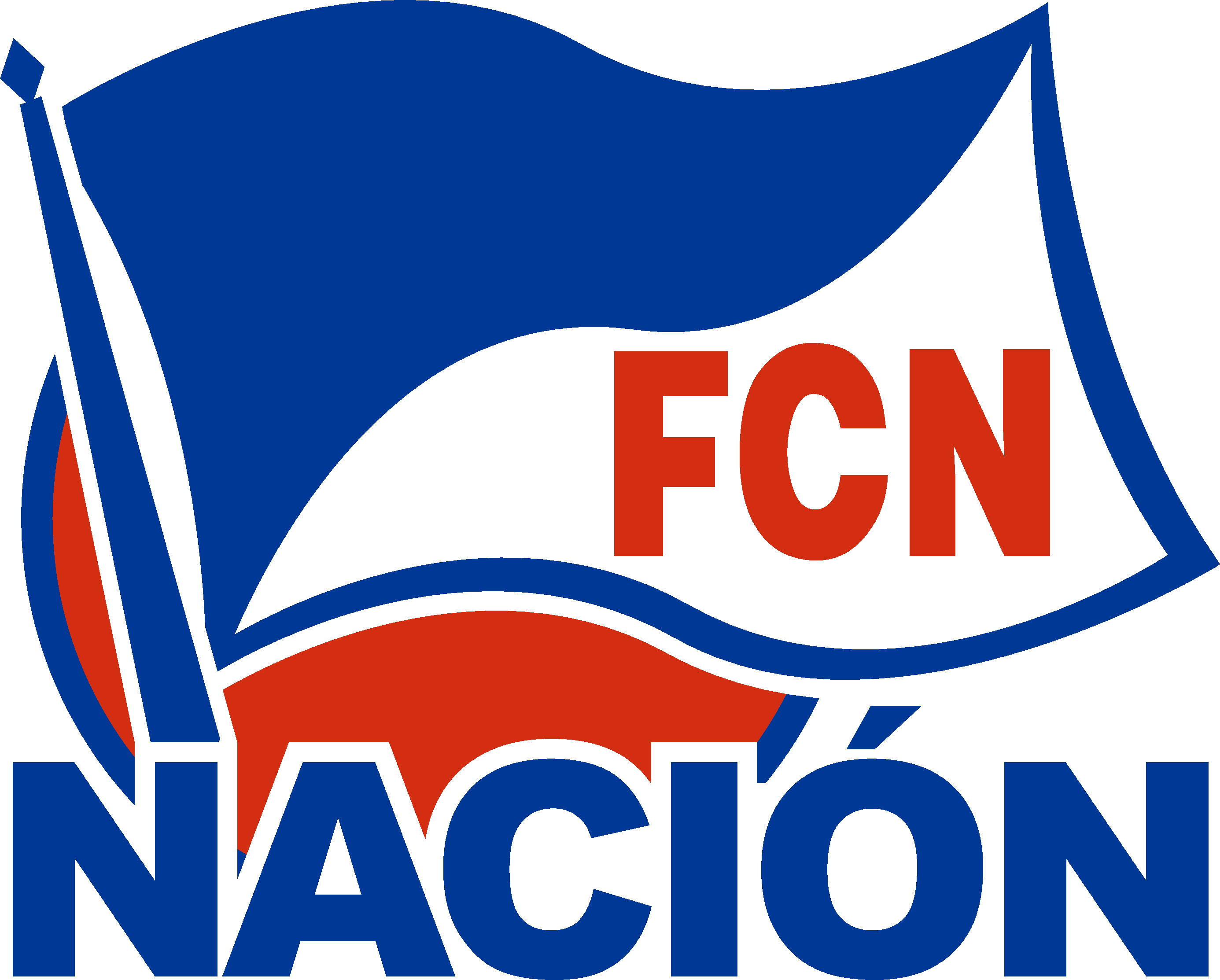
- President: Jimmy Morales
- General Secretary: Javier Alfonso Hernández Franco
- Founded: 7 January 2008
- Dissolved: 8 January 2024
- Ideology: Conservatism; Nationalism; Christian right
- Political position: Right-wing to far-right
- Colors: Blue

Website
- www.fcnnacion.com

The National Convergence Front (Spanish: Frente de Convergencia Nacional, FCN–Nación) was a right-wing political party in Guatemala.

== History ==
The party was established on 7 January 2008. It was initiated by a group of retired army officers, including veterans of Guatemalan Civil War, affiliated with the Military Veterans Association of Guatemala AVEMILGUA. FCN did not nominate a presidential candidate in the 2011 general elections, but contested the Congressional elections, receiving 0.5% of the vote and failing to win a seat. In March 2013, the party chose the popular comic TV actor Jimmy Morales as its General Secretary.

Morales was the party's presidential candidate in the 2015 elections, which he won after receiving the largest vote share in the first round (24%) and then beating former first lady Sandra Torres in the run-off with 67% of the vote. In the Congressional elections the FCN received the fifth-highest vote share (9%), winning 11 of the 158 seats.

FCN's head of the national list was Édgar Justino Ovalle Maldonado who is considered to be Jimmy Morales' "right-hand man". He commanded counter-insurgency operations in the Ixil Community in the early 1980s during which several massacres against the Ixil Mayas took place. The violence against the Ixil was acknowledged as a genocide by the Supreme Court of Guatemala, but is denied by Jimmy Morales.

== Election results ==
=== President ===
Election	Candidate		First round		Second round		Status
Election	President	Vice President	Votes	%	Votes	%	Status
2011	Did not participate						
2015	Jimmy Morales	Jafeth Cabrera	1,152,394	23.99%	2,751,058	67.44%	Won
2019	Estuardo Galdámez	Betty Marroquín Silva	180,983	4.12%	—N/a	—N/a	Lost
2023	Sammy Morales	Miguel Moir	21,971	0.53%	—N/a	—N/a	Lost

=== Congress ===
Election	Votes	%	Seats	+/–	Status
2011	23,272	0.53 (#14)	0 / 158	New	Extra-parliamentary
2015	403,086	8.84 (#5)	11 / 158	▲11	Government
2019	211,453	5.23 (#5)	8 / 160	▼3	External support
2023	28,827	0.69 (#23)	0 / 160	▼8	Extra-parliamentary
