= Winaq =

- General Secretary: Sonia Gutiérrez Raguay
- Founded: February 2007
- Legalised: 2008
- Split from: New Nation Alternative
- Headquarters: 10 calle 6-81 Zona 1, Ciudad de Guatemala
- Ideology: Progressivism; Indigenismo; Left-wing nationalism
- Political position: Left-wing
- Regional affiliation: São Paulo Forum
- Colors: Red
- Congress: 1 / 160

Winaq (K'iche' for 'people' or 'humanity') is a left-wing political party in Guatemala whose most notable member is Rigoberta Menchú, an ethnic K'iche'. Its roots are in the indigenous communities of Guatemala.

== Ideology ==
In a working paper of a seminar organised by FLACSO Guatemala and the Friedrich Ebert Foundation written in 2007, it was concluded that Winaq had an ambiguous ideology, trying to combine adversarial interests. Later, after committing to an alliance with other left-wing parties, the party developed a more pronounced left-wing perspective with eco-socialist leanings. The party is known for its political activism to prohibit infrastructure projects that threaten natural goods, especially rivers and water quality.

== History ==
=== Formation and early results ===
In the 2007 general elections, Winaq's pro-formation committee participated with the Encuentro por Guatemala party, nominating Rigoberta Menchú as presidential candidate. The alliance came in seventh place in the presidential elections. The alliance fared slightly better at the legislative elections gathering 6.18% of the national vote and 4 seats. In 2008 the party finally secured enough affiliates to register as a legal party, which was heralded by the Guatemala Times, as "one of the most important steps ever achieved by a Mayan political leader in Guatemala."

=== Entering the Broad Front of the Left coalition ===
In the 2011 general elections, the Guatemalan left created an alliance called Frente Amplio, made up of the political parties Unidad Revolucionaria Nacional Guatemalteca (URNG-MAIZ), Alternativa Nueva Nación (ANN), Winaq and the pro-formation committee of the Movimiento Nueva República (MNR). Rigoberta Menchú was unanimously proclaimed as presidential candidate and Anibal García as vice presidential candidate. They obtained around 3% of the vote. The party sat in opposition to the Molina government and played a leading role in his eventual resignation, when Congressman Amilcar Pop brought up a lawsuit against Molina on 24 April 2015. In return the Congressman received multiple death threats for his anti-corruption work in the legislature.

The coalition was maintained for the elections in 2015, wherein the party ran with Miguel Ángel Sandoval and Mario Ellintong as president and vice-president respectively, receiving about 2% of the vote. In the congressional elections the alliance actually gained votes and gathered 4.36% of the national vote, yet lost 3 mandates in the Congress.

=== Coalition split ===
Ahead of the 2019 elections the alliance split up, forcing the party to run on its own. Even so the party was able to muster 3.51% of the vote, granting it 4 seats in the chamber. Its presidential ticket with Manuel Villacorta as head and Izabel Hernández as vice-president reached their best result in party history, coming sixth with 5.27% of the vote. During his presidential campaign Villacorta focused on corruption, the fight against poverty through wealth redistribution and infrastructure development. After the elections the party largely opposed the government of Giammattei and supported the mining protests occurring in El Estor since October 2021.

=== Restored left-wing alliance ===
On 7 June 2022 party leadership released a statement, concurring with Sandoval's appeal for a new coalition of left-wing forces that can challenge the current governing forces. Since the current electoral law favours smaller parties, it has not yet been decided what form this new alliance will take. At the end of January, URNG and Winaq made their renewed alliance public and proclaimed Amílcar Pop and Mónica Enríquez as their presidential ticket for the upcoming elections. The parties also planned to involve Semilla in their effort to win the mayorship of Guatemala City. In 2023, presidential candidate Amilcar Pop stated that Winaq does not propose an "ethnocentric or indigenist" government similar to Bolivia.

== Electoral history ==
=== Presidential elections ===
Election	Candidates		First round		Second round		Status
Election	President	Vice President	Votes	%	Votes	%	Status
2007 (Note: Joint ticket with Encuentro por Guatemala.)	Rigoberta Menchú	Luis Fernando Montenegro	100,365	3.06 (#7)	—	—	Lost ✗
2011 (Note: Joint ticket as part of the Broad Front of the Left coalition.)	Rigoberta Menchú	Aníbal García	145,080	3.26 (#6)	—	—	Lost ✗
2015 (Note: Joint ticket with the Guatemalan National Revolutionary Unity.)	Miguel Ángel Sandoval	Mario Ellintong	101,347	2.11 (#11)	—	—	Lost ✗
2019	Manuel Villacorta	Izabel Hernández	229,362	5.24 (#7)	—	—	Lost ✗
2023	Amílcar Pop	Mónica Enríquez	87,676	2.09 (#10)	—	—	Lost ✗

=== Legislative elections ===
Election	Votes	%	Seats	+/–	Status
2007 (Note: Run in coalition with Encuentro por Guatemala.)	194,809	6.18 (#5)	4 / 158	New	Opposition
2011 (Note: Run as part of the Broad Front of the Left.)	143,238	3.27 (#7)	4 / 158	0	Opposition
2015 (Note: Run in coalition with Guatemalan National Revolutionary Unity.)	198,715	4.36 (#9)	1 / 158	▼3	Opposition
2019	141,252	3.51 (#12)	4 / 160	▲3	Opposition
2023	133,694	3.21	1 / 160	▼3	External support
