= Unidos (political party) =

United Unidos
- Secretary-General: Francisco Lemus Miranda
- Founded: 2015
- Dissolved: February 27, 2020
- Ideology: Right-wing
- Colors: Blue and red
- Seats in Congress: 0 / 158

Unidos (lit. United) was a political party in Guatemala.

== History ==
The political party was registered by the Supreme Electoral Tribunal in 2015 with the necessary affiliates. On September 25, 2015, the Supreme Electoral Tribunal authorized its registration to qualify it as a political party. On February 21, 2016, it held its first Assembly.

== Electoral history ==
=== Presidential elections ===
Election date	Party candidate	Number of votes	Percentage of votes	Number of votes	Percentage of votes	Result
Election date	Party candidate	First round		Second round		Result
2019	Luis Velásquez	26,724	0.62	—	—	Lost

=== Legislative elections ===
Election	Votes	%	Seats	+/–	Status
2019	25,258	0.63 (#26)	0 / 160	New	Extra-parliamentary
