= Valor (political party) =

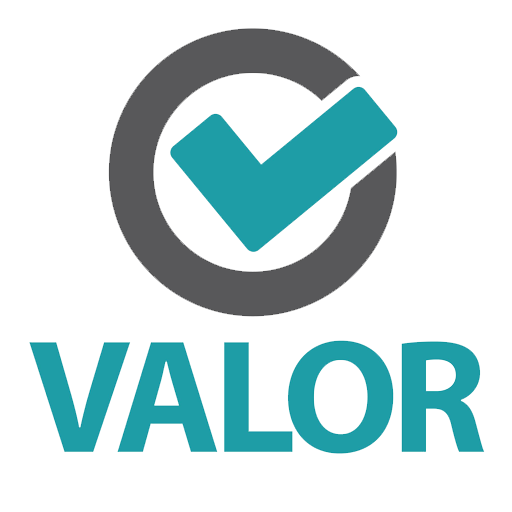
- Secretary-General: Elmer Palencia
- Founded: 2017
- Preceded by: Guatemalan Republican Front
- Ideology: National conservatism Right-wing populism Anti-socialism; Christian right
- Political position: Right-wing to far-right
- Regional affiliation: Union of Latin American Parties
- Colors: Turquoise and gray
- Seats in Congress: 10 / 160

Website
- valor.gt

Valor is a conservative and right-wing populist political party in Guatemala.

== History ==
The party was established in 2017 by Ana Ingrid Bernat Cofiño. The party was initially re-founded with the tab of the late Progressive Liberation Party. It has 27 thousand affiliates. The first public act was in May 2017. Its leader is Zury Ríos, a former presidential candidate and daughter of Efraín Ríos Montt.

During the beginning of the 10th Legislature, the Valor parliamentary group in Congress was in opposition to the government of Bernardo Arévalo, but after the middle of the year, Valor began to negotiate with the governing legislative coalition, with the exception of deputy Sandra Jovel, who has remained in the opposition.

== Electoral history ==
=== Presidential elections ===
Election	Candidates		First round		Second round		Status
Election	President	Vice President	Votes	%	Votes	%	Status
2019 (Note: Zury Ríos' candidature was rejected by the Constitutional Court of Guatemala, as close relatives of coup leaders are prohibited from seeking the office.)	Zury Ríos	Roberto Molina	Disqualified				
2023 (Note: Valor - Unionista joint ticket, with Valor expressing the presidential candidate and Unionista expressing the vice-presidential candidate.)	Zury Ríos	Héctor Cifuentes	365,028	8.69	—N/a	—N/a	Lost ✗

=== Legislative elections ===
Election	Votes	%	Seats	+/–	Status
2019	183,814	4.56 (#9)	9 / 160	New	External support
2023 (Note: Run in coalition with Unionist Party.)	229,861	5.51 (#6)	10 / 160	▲1	Opposition (2024)
2023	229,861	5.51 (#6)	10 / 160	▲1	External support (2024–present)
