= National Change Union =

National Change Union Unión del Cambio Nacional
- Leader: Mario Estrada
- Secretary-General: Mario Estrada
- Founded: 20 November 2006
- Dissolved: 16 December 2021
- Ideology: National liberalism
- Political position: Right-wing to far-right
- Regional affiliation: Center-Democratic Integration Group

The National Change Union (Spanish: Unión del Cambio Nacional), sometimes translated as the Union of National Change, was a national liberal political party in Guatemala.

== History ==
In the legislative elections held on 9 September 2007, the party secured 4.06% of the votes in the race for national-list deputies and held four seats in the 2008-12 Congressional Term. In the presidential election of the same day, its candidate Mario Estrada won 3.16% of the popular vote.

For the 2011 elections the party again nominated Mario Estrada as their presidential candidate, who this time received about 8.7% of the vote. The party was also able to increase its level of support at the simultaneous parliamentary elections, receiving about 9.5% of the national vote. After the elections the party largely supported the government of President Molina, thereby electing Sofía Jeaneth Hernández Herrer, whose parliamentary immunity was later lifted in 2017 due to accusations of influence peddling, as first Vice-President of Congress.

Before the elections in 2015 the party once again nominated Mario Estrada as their presidential candidate, this time together with the vice-presidential candidate Roberto Díaz-Durán. The ticket ultimately lost some ground and got about 3.4% of the vote. The party fared better at the parliamentary elections, receiving about 8.8% of the national vote and returned 11 members to Congress.

Prior to the elections in 2019, the party tried to renominate their perennial presidential candidate Mario Estrada, but he was disqualified from seeking office by the Constitutional Court of Guatemala owing to an indictment for drug-trafficking charges. Nonetheless, the party participated at the legislative elections and received approximately 5.4% of the vote and elected 12 members to Congress.

After multiple protests in May 2022, members of the party introduced a new police law, also known as Initiative 6076, to Congress. According to the party the law seeks to modernize the police force in Guatemala. The law passed its first reading with 150 members of Congress voting in favor, before being shelved on 23 August 2022 due to the protest of 48 cantons.

== Ideology ==
In US embassy cables describing the ideology of political parties in Guatemala, the UCN was described as "a small party based in eastern Guatemala reportedly tied to narcotraffickers" or simply as "narco".

In April 2019, Mario Estrada was arrested. He is accused by the American authorities of having made a deal with the Sinaloa cartel - from which he allegedly obtained between 10 and 12 million dollars for his election campaign - and of having ordered the murder of rival candidates.

On 19 January 2021 the mayor of Ocós and brother of Congresswomen Vivian Preciado Navarijo, Carlos Danilo Preciado Navarijo, was arrested on an Interpol notice for drug-trafficking in Panama. In April 2021, both him and Estrada also appeared on a United States Department of State list of corrupt officials in Central America.

== Election results ==
=== Congress of the Republic ===
Election	Votes	%	Seats	+/–	Status
2007	128,109	4.06 (#9)	5 / 158	▲5	External support
2011	418,175	9.54 (#3)	14 / 158	▲9	External support
2015	403,086	8.84 (#9)	7 / 158	▼14	External support
2019	218,914	5.44 (#3)	12 / 160	▲5	External support

=== President of the Republic of Guatemala ===
Election	Candidates		First round		Second round		Status
Election	President	Vice President	Votes	%	Votes	%	Status
2007	Mario Estrada	Mario Torres Marroquín	103,695	3.16 (#6)	-	-	Lost
2011	Mario Estrada	Mauricio Urruela	387,001	8.69 (#4)	-	-	Lost
2015	Mario Estrada	Roberto Díaz-Durán	163,974	3.41 (#9)	-	-	Lost
2019	Mario Estrada (Note: Candidature revoked by the Constitutional Court of Guatemala, as he was accused of drug-trafficking and conspriring with the Sinaloa cartel.)	Javier Castillo	-	-	-	-	Disqualified
