= Encuentro por Guatemala =

Encounter for Guatemala Encuentro por Guatemala
- Leader: Nineth Montenegro
- Secretary-General: Nineth Montenegro
- Founded: 2007
- Dissolved: February 27, 2020
- Split from: New Nation Alternative
- Ideology: Ethnic interests of the Indigenous; Social democracy Progressivism
- Political position: Centre-left; Before 2011: Centre-left to left-wing
- Colors: Red and Green
- Congress: 0 / 160

Website
- http://encuentro.gt/

Encuentro por Guatemala ("EG")– a Spanish name variously translated as "Encounter for Guatemala" (for example, by the BBC and CNN), or as "Together for Guatemala" (Reuters) – was a Guatemalan political party; encuentro may also translate as "gathering", "meeting", or "union".

Its logo is a red circle with four green dots on its circumference, representing the coming together of the four peoples that make up the Guatemalan nationality: Mayas, Garifunas, Xincas and Ladinos.

== History ==
=== Foundation and early splits ===
The party was founded in 2007, in the run-up to that year's 9 September general election. Its presidential candidate was Rigoberta Menchú, the Nobel Peace Prize-winning indigenous activist, running on a ticket with businessman Luis Fernando Montenegro as her vice-presidential hopeful. They secured 3.09% of the popular vote.

In the Congressional election held on the same day, the party fared somewhat better, receiving 6.17% of the popular vote, which was enough to secure them four national-list deputies in Congress for the 2008–12 legislative period: Armando Sánchez Gómez, Rodolfo Aníbal García, Nineth Montenegro and Otilia Lux. Subsequently, only Nineth Montenegro has remained with the party; the other three deputies have left Encounter for Guatemala to operate as independents. Rodolfo Aníbal García has since formed a new political party, the New Republic Movement (Movimiento Nueva República (MNR)). Rigoberta Menchú has gone on to form the Winaq political party. Both MNR and Winaq participated in the 2011 elections as part of the Broad Leftist Front (Frente Amplio de Izquierda).

=== Shift to the right ===
For the 2011 elections, Encuentro formed a political alliance with center-right ViVa, another political party; its presidential and vice-presidential candidates were Harold Caballeros and Efraín Medina, with party leader Nineth Montenegro leading the list of legislative candidates. The alliance between the two parties eventually broke up and the party ran on its own again in 2015, receiving 6.35% of the national vote for the legislature, while its presidential ticket with José Ángel López and Peter Lamport fared significantly worse garnering only 0.91% of the vote.

=== Electoral decline and closure ===
In the 2019 election, the party chose Manfredo Marroquín as its presidential candidate. He came in fourteenth place with 1.15% of the vote. In the Legislative Election, the party won 1.79% of the vote and no seats in Congress. Having failed to secure the minimum of 5% of the popular vote or one seat in Congress, Encuentro por Guatemala forfeited its registration as a party.

== Election results ==
=== Presidential elections ===
Election	Candidates		First round		Second round		Status
Election	President	Vice President	Votes	%	Votes	%	Status
2007 (Note: Run in coalition with Winaq.)	Rigoberta Menchú	Luis Fernando Montenegro	100,365	3.06 (#7)	-	-	Lost
2011 (Note: Run in coalition with ViVa.)	Harold Caballeros	Efraín Medina	277,365	6.23 (#5)	-	-	Lost
2015	José Ángel López	Peter Lamport	43,916	0.91 (#12)	-	-	Lost
2019	Manfredo Marroquín	Oscar Adolfo Morales	50,594	1.16 (#14)	-	-	Lost

=== Legislative elections ===
Election	Votes	%	Seats	+/–	Status
2007 (Note: Run in coalition with Winaq.)	194,809	6.18 (#5)	4 / 158	New	Opposition
2011 (Note: Run in coalition with ViVa.)	345,709	7.88 (#6)	6 / 158	▲2	Opposition
2015	289,646	6.35 (#6)	7 / 158	▲1	Opposition
2019	71,668	1.78 (#20)	0 / 160	▼7	Extra-parliamentary
