= Commitment, Renewal and Order =

Commitment, Renewal and Order Compromiso, Renovación y Orden
- Leader: Roberto González Díaz-Durán
- Founded: 27 October 2010
- Ideology: Economic liberalism Social conservatism Familialism
- Political position: Centre-right
- Central American Parliament: Center-Democratic Integration Group
- Seats in Congress: 3 / 160

Website
- creo.org.gt

Commitment, Renewal and Order (Spanish: Compromiso, Renovación y Orden, CREO; lit. 'I believe') is a political party in Guatemala.

== History ==
The party was established on 27 October 2010. In the 2011 general elections it nominated Eduardo Suger as its presidential candidate; Suger finished third with 16% of the vote. In the Congressional elections the party finished fifth with 9% of the vote, winning 12 of the 158 seats.

In the 2015 general elections the party entered into an electoral pact with the Unionist Party. In the Congressional elections the alliance received 5.73% of the vote, winning five seats in Congress. Its presidential candidate was leader Roberto González Díaz-Durán, who received 3.48% of the vote

In the 2019 general elections, the party received 4.41% of the Congressional vote and won six seats. Its presidential ticket, with Julio Héctor Estrada and Yara Argueta running for President and Vice President respectively, focused their campaign on strengthening state institutions and reformation of the penal system, including the construction of a high-security prison in the north of Guatemala and received 3.77% of the vote.

In the 2023 general elections, the party the nominated former Health Minister Francisco Arredondo as a presidential candidate and former Defense Minister Francisco Bermúdez as a vice-presidential candidate. On 21 March, the Electoral Tribunal announced that it had rejected the candidacy due to "legal problems" of Arredondo. The political party filed a legal appeal to reverse the decision of the electoral court, finally, the magistrates accepted the appeal and registered Arredondo as a presidential candidate.

== Election results ==
=== President ===
| Election | Candidate | | First round | | Second round | | Status |
| Election | President | Vice President | Votes | % | Votes | % | Status |
|---|---|---|---|---|---|---|---|
| 2011 | Eduardo Suger | Laura Reyes | 737,452 | 16.56 (#3) | —N/a | —N/a | Lost |
| 2015 (Note: Ran in coalition with the UP.) | Roberto González Díaz-Durán | Rodolfo Neutze Aguirre | 166,960 | 3.48 (#8) | —N/a | —N/a | Lost |
| 2019 | Julio Héctor Estrada | Yara Argueta | 165,031 | 3.77 (#9) | —N/a | —N/a | Lost |
| 2023 | Francisco Arredondo | Francisco Bermúdez | 41,601 | 1.00 (#15) | —N/a | —N/a | Lost |

=== Congress ===
| Election | Votes | % | Seats | +/– | Status |
|---|---|---|---|---|---|
| 2011 | 382,730 | 8.73 (#5) | 12 / 158 | New | Opposition |
| 2015 (Note: Ran in coalition with the UP.) | 261,040 | 5.73 (#7) | 5 / 158 | ▼8 | Opposition |
| 2019 | 177,681 | 4.41 (#9) | 6 / 160 | ▲1 | Opposition |
| 2023 | 84,667 | 2.03 (#16) | 3 / 160 | ▼3 | External support |
