= Vamos (Guatemala) =

Let's Go for a Different Guatemala Vamos por una Guatemala Diferente
- Leader: Allan Rodríguez
- Secretary-General: Víctor Valenzuela
- Founder: Alejandro Giammattei
- Founded: 27 July 2017
- Ideology: Conservatism; Social conservatism Neoliberalism; Economic liberalism
- Political position: Centre-right to right-wing
- Colors: Blue
- Seats in Congress: 39 / 160

Website
- vamosguatemala.com (archived)

Vamos (lit. 'Come on' or 'Let's go'; officially Vamos por una Guatemala Diferente, lit. 'Let's Go for a Different Guatemala') is a conservative political party in Guatemala.

== History ==
The political party was founded and registered by the Supreme Electoral Tribunal in 2017. Its leader and general secretary is Alejandro Giammattei, a three-time presidential candidate. Giammattei declared that the political party would be his platform to run in the 2019 general election.

Vamos defines itself as a center-right political party. It held its first national assembly in October 2018, proclaiming Giammattei as its presidential candidate. In the 2019 Guatemalan general elections, Alejandro Giammattei was elected president of the Republic.

The party has been criticized by some as a result of some former military officers who were accused of war crimes joining the party.

== Electoral history ==
=== Presidential elections ===
Election	Candidates		First round		Second round		Status
Election	President	Vice President	Votes	%	Votes	%	Status
2019	Alejandro Giammattei	Guillermo Castillo	613,302	13.95	1,907,696	57.95	Won ✓
2023	Manuel Conde	Luis Suárez	435,631	10.37	—N/a	—N/a	Lost ✗

=== Legislative elections ===
Election	Votes	%	Seats	+/–	Position	Status
2019	321,830	7.96 (#2)	16 / 160	New	▲2nd	Government
2023	628,126	15.06 (#1)	39 / 160	▲23	▲1st	Opposition
