= Productivity and Work Party =

Productivity and Work Party Partido Productividad y Trabajo
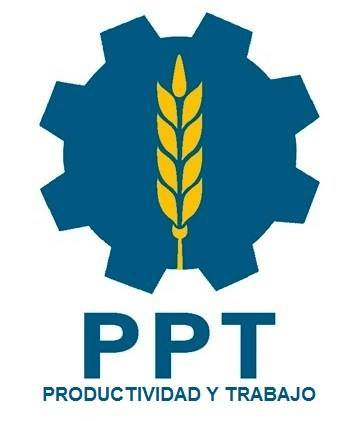
- Secretary-General: Edgar Alfredo Rodríguez
- Founded: 2015
- Dissolved: February 27, 2020
- Ideology: Social democracy Constitutionalism
- Political position: Centre-left
- Colors: Blue and yellow
- Seats in Congress: 0 / 158

The Productivity and Work Party (Spanish: Partido Productividad y Trabajo) was a political party in Guatemala.

== History ==
The political party was registered by the Supreme Electoral Tribunal in 2015 with the necessary affiliates. Its general secretary is Edgar Alfredo Rodríguez, Minister of Labor during the government of Álvaro Colom. It was the political platform of former Finance Minister Juan Alberto Fuentes.

== Electoral history ==
=== Presidential elections ===
Election date	Party candidate	Number of votes	Percentage of votes	Number of votes	Percentage of votes	Result
Election date	Party candidate	First round		Second round		Result
2019	José Luis Chea Urruela	23,783	0.55	—	—	Lost

=== Legislative elections ===
Election	Votes	%	Seats	+/–	Status
2019	29,729	0.74 (#25)	0 / 160	New	Extra-parliamentary
