= Vision with Values =

Vision with Values Visión con Valores
- Leader: Armando Castillo
- Founder: Harold Caballeros
- Founded: 20 January 2007
- Ideology: Christian right Rhine capitalism
- Political position: Right-wing
- Seats in Congress: 11 / 160

Website
- www.partidoviva.com.gt

Vision with Values (Spanish: Visión con Valores, ViVa) is a political party in Guatemala.

== History ==
The party was established on 20 January 2007 by Harold Caballeros. It contested the 2011 general elections in alliance with Encuentro por Guatemala, nominating nominated Caballeros as its presidential candidate; Suger finished fifth in a field of ten candidates with 6% of the vote. In the Congressional elections the parties won six of the 158 seats.

After the alliance with Encuentro por Guatemala ended, the party contested the elections in 2015 alone with Zury Ríos, the daughter of general and military dictator Efraín Ríos Montt, as its presidential candidate. Together with vice-presidential candidate Juan Luis Mirón, she received 6% of the vote. In the congressional elections the party received 4% of the vote and won five seats. In April 2019 congressional candidate Julio Rosales, who stood for a seat in Retalhuleu, was dismissed from the party after an arrest warrant from the Texas District Court concerning the production and distribution of heroin, was executed in Guatemala City.

In 2019 the party nominated Isaac Farchi as its presidential candidate. His campaign focused on corruption and security issues in Guatemala, naming Israel as a positive role model for the latter. He received about 6% of the vote. In the legislative elections the party increased its vote share slightly to 4.7%, winning seven seats. After the elections the party supported the agenda of President Alejandro Giammattei and supported the election of Shirley Rivera for President of the Congress in October 2021.

== Election results ==
=== President ===
Election	Candidate		First round		Second round		Status
Election	President	Vice President	Votes	%	Votes	%	Status
2011	Harold Caballeros	Efraín Medina	277,365	6.23 (#5) (Note: In alliance with the EG.)	—N/a	—N/a	Lost
2015	Zury Ríos	Juan Luis Mirón	286,730	5.97 (#5)	—N/a	—N/a	Lost
2019	Isaac Farchi	Ricardo Flores Asturias	259,616	5.93 (#6)	—N/a	—N/a	Lost
2023	Armando Castillo	Édgar Grisolia	400,353	9.63 (#4)	—N/a	—N/a	Lost

=== Congress ===
Election	Votes	%	Seats	+/–	Status
2011	345,709	7.88 (#6)	6 / 158	New	External support
2015	168,707	3.70 (#11)	5 / 158	▼1	External support
2019	189,467	4.70 (#7)	7 / 160	▲2	External support
2023	288,546	6.92 (#5)	11 / 160	▲4	External support
