= Todos (Guatemala) =

Political party in Guatemala

- Leader: Felipe Alejos
- Founded: 26 August 2012
- Split from: National Unity of Hope
- Ideology: Social conservatism Christian humanism
- Political position: Centre-right
- Seats in Congress: 6 / 160

Website
- todos.gt

Todos (lit. 'All') is a political party in Guatemala.

== History ==
In November 2011 a group of seven MPs from National Unity of Hope (UNE) led by Roberto Alejos left the party. After more MPs left the UNE, taking the group's membership beyond 11, they were allowed to form a parliamentary faction, which became known as "Purple Ties" after the neckties worn by its members. Alejos began the process of registering a new party, and held talks with Rodolfo Rosales García-Salas about forming a coalition with the Greens. A meeting was held on 26 August 2012 in which the Greens agreed to change the party name and symbols, becoming "Todos".

Prior to the 2015 elections the party nominated Lizardo Arturo Sosa López as its presidential candidate within an election campaign that witnessed a wave of violence, as two candidates running for the party to be elected mayor or deputy mayor were killed in July 2015. Sosa ultimately finished fifth in a field of fourteen candidates with 5% of the vote. However, the party performed better in the Congressional elections, receiving 11% of the vote, winning 18 of the 158 seats. After the election the party assisted the government of Jimmy Morales with party president Felipe Alejos becoming first Vice President of the Congress. After disagreements within the party, Roberto Alejos, co-founder of the party and uncle of Felipe Alejos, left the party in March 2017. On 5 December 2018, Felipe Alejos was indicted for giving false testimony and perjury, but the case was not taken up because he enjoyed parliamentary immunity. After a long investigation the party was also indicted for receiving illegal campaign funds on 18 December 2018 by Oscar Sagastume, the inspector general of the TSE.

For the 2019 elections, the party congress chose Fredy Cabrera and Ricardo Sagastume as their presidential ticket. Their platform included the establishment of a Ministry of Tourism and a doubling of the police force during their term; they eventually received 3% of the vote. The party also lost significant support in the congressional elections, in which it received 4% of the vote and was reduced to seven seats. After the elections the party generally acted as an ally of President Giammattei and supported the election of Rivera as President of the Congress. In 2021, two of its Congressmen, namely Felipe Alejos and Boris Caceres, appeared on a list of corrupt officials in Central America compiled by the United States Department of State and published by representative Norma Torres.

== Election results ==
=== President ===
Election	Candidates		First round		Second round		Status
Election	President	Vice President	Votes	%	Votes	%	Status
2015	Lizardo Sosa	Mario García	259,673	5.41 (#6)	—	—	Lost
2019	Fredy Cabrera	Ricardo Sagastume	138,333	3.16 (#10)	—	—	Lost
2023	Ricardo Sagastume	Guillermo González	76,582	1.82 (#11)	—	—	Lost

=== Congress ===
Election	Votes	%	Seats	+/–	Status
2015	445,996	9.78 (#3)	18 / 158	New	External support
2019	177,182	4.40 (#11)	7 / 160	▼11	External support
2023	169,101	4.05 (#8)	6 / 160	▼1	Opposition
