= Humanist Party of Guatemala =

Humanist Party of Guatemala Partido Humanista de Guatemala
- Abbreviation: PHG
- Leader: Rudio Lecsan Mérida
- Secretary-General: Rudio Lecsan Mérida
- Founded: 17 January 2017
- Legalised: 10 October 2018
- Dissolved: 8 January 2024
- Ideology: Humanism
- Political position: Right-wing
- Colors: Blue
- Seats in Congress: 0 / 160

Website
- https://partidohumanistaguate.org/

The Humanist Party of Guatemala was a political party in Guatemala. It focused on Humanism and was led by Rudio Lecsan Mérida and was dissolved on January 8th, 2024.

== History ==
The Humanist Party was registered before the Supreme Electoral Tribunal on January 17, 2017. Its general secretary is Rudio Lecsan Mérida, former director of the National Civil Police during the government of Alfonso Portillo, and a former leader of the Humanist Party was the Guatemalan diplomat and politician Edmond Mulet. The process of constituting the party ended on January 16, 2019. It has more than 23,840 members. In September 2018, the political organization completed the requirements and was made an official political party in the same month.

The party supports the withdrawal of Guatemala from the Central American Parliament.

In January 2020, the Humanist Party declared itself "in opposition" to the government of Alejandro Giammattei, but within a few months the party became part of the ruling coalition. Mulet denounced the act and resigned his membership of the party.

== Electoral history ==
=== Presidential elections ===
Election	Candidates		First round		Second round		Status
Election	President	Vice President	Votes	%	Votes	%	Status
2019	Edmond Mulet	Jorge Pérez	493,710	11.28 (#3)	—N/a	—N/a	Lost ✗
2023	Rudio Lecsan Mérida	Rubén Darío Rosales	34,285	0.76 (#18)	—N/a	—N/a	Lost ✗

=== Legislative elections ===
Election	Votes	%	Seats	+/–	Status
2019	188,234	4.67 (#8)	6 / 160	New	External support
2023	61,564	1.48 (#18)	0 / 160	▼6	Extra-parliamentary
