= Inauguration of Bernardo Arévalo =

2024 Guatemala presidential inauguration ceremony

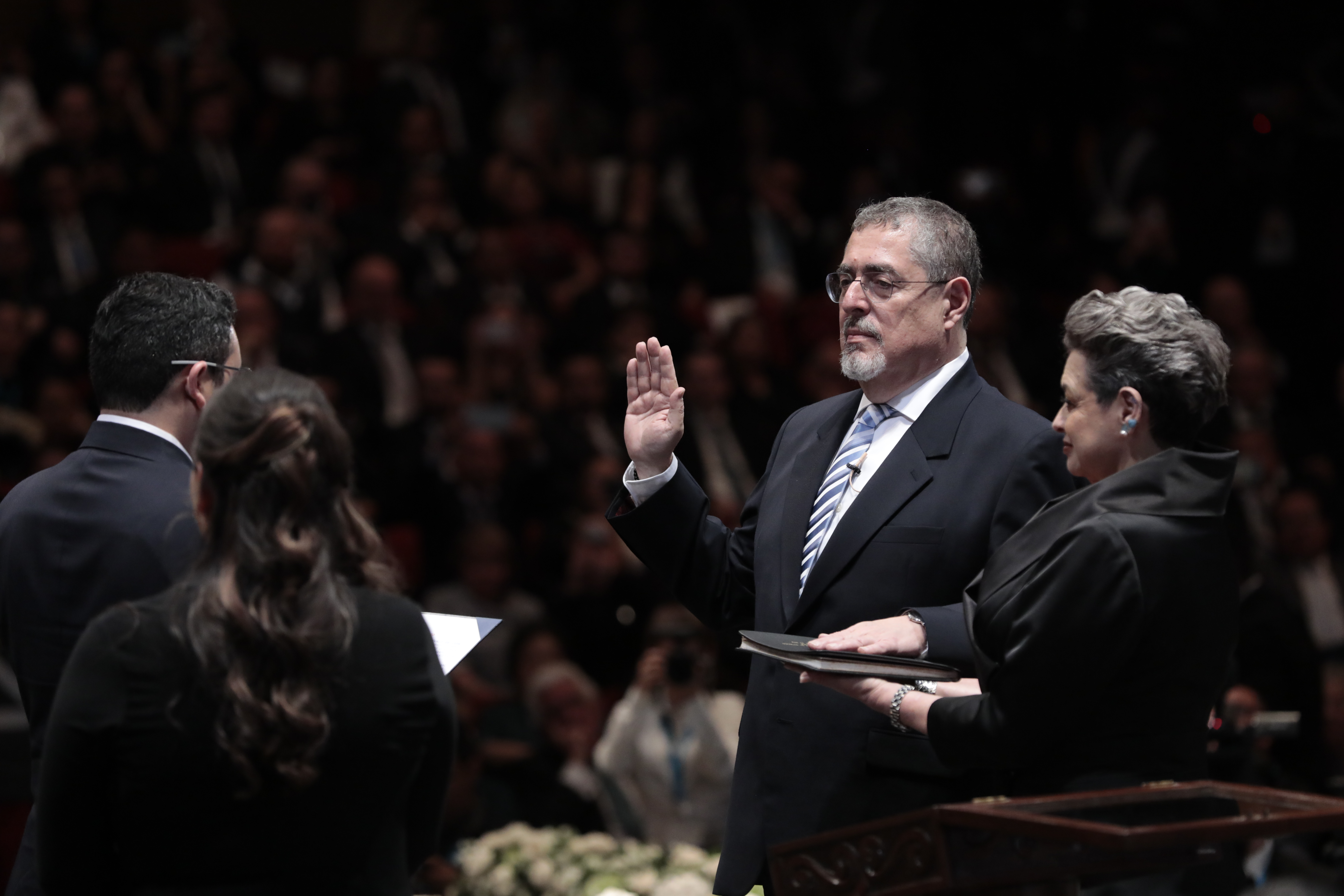
- Bernardo Arévalo taking the oath of office as the 52nd president of Guatemala.
- Date: 14 January 2024 (official); 15 January 2024 (public)
- Location: Centro Cultural Miguel Ángel Asturias, Guatemala City
- Organized by: Ministry of Foreign Affairs, Secretariat of Social Communications of the Presidency
- Participants: Bernardo Arévalo; 52nd president of Guatemala —Assuming office Karin Herrera; 18th vice president of Guatemala —Assuming office Samuel Pérez; President of the Congress of Guatemala —Administering oath
- Website: www.tmp2024.gob.gt

Bernardo Arévalo was inaugurated as the president of Guatemala on 15 January 2024, marking the commencement of the four-year term of Arévalo as president and Karin Herrera as vice president.

The inaugural ceremony took place at Centro Cultural Miguel Ángel Asturias in Guatemala City and became the eighth presidential inauguration held in the Great Room "Efraín Recinos". Lack of approval for a congressional delegation resulted in the ceremony being delayed from the scheduled time on 14 January to the very early morning of 15 January.

== Context ==
The inauguration marked the end of the presidential transition from outgoing president Alejandro Giammattei to Bernardo Arévalo (Movimiento Semilla), who became president-elect after defeating Sandra Torres (National Unity of Hope) in the second round of the 2023 Guatemalan general election on 20 August 2023. According to official results, he obtained 61% of the votes, a landslide victory. Shortly after the election, judge Fredy Orellana issued a ruling to reinstate a suspension of Semilla's party registration. The Registry of Citizens of the Supreme Electoral Tribunal (TSE) provisionally cancelled the party's registration on 28 August. Semilla filed an appeal, saying the ruling was an attempt to prevent the party's parliamentarians and president-elect from taking office. It was previously targeted during the 2019 elections, with its presidential candidate, Thelma Aldana, considered the frontrunner, having her candidacy rejected for dubious reasons. She appealed but was denied. On 30 August 2023, President of Congress Shirley Rivera dissolved the parliamentary group of Semilla and declared them "independent". President-elect and member of Congress Bernardo Arévalo was also affected by the decision. On 3 September, the TSE nullified the suspension of the party's registration through October. The offices of the TSE were also raided several times under the pretense of investigating alleged fraud, despite no evidence being presented.

On 2 November, Movimiento Semilla was officially suspended by the Public Ministry. Indigenous movements vowed to continue to protest, and the United States government stripped the visas of 14 people in the Public Ministry on the same day. The U.S. State Department's Deputy Assistant Secretary for Western Hemisphere Affairs, Eric Jacobstein, stated that the suspension was worrisome as an apparent way to interfere with Arévalo's transition to office. The suspension also means that members of the party elected to the Congress of the Republic of Guatemala under the banner of the party cannot hold leadership positions or chair committees. It also means that the party cannot hold assemblies or carry out administrative procedures.

In mid-November, the Public Ministry requested that the immunity of President-elect Arévalo and Vice President-elect Karin Herrera be withdrawn for allegedly participating in the takeover of the facilities of the state university, the Universidad de San Carlos de Guatemala, which occurred between April 2022 to June 2023. This takeover occurred as a result of alleged irregularities that occurred in the elections for rector of the university, where Walter Mazariegos was elected. In 2023, Mazariegos was included on the United States government's Engel list. According to the State Department, Mazariegos "undermined democratic processes or institutions by accepting the position of rector of the public education institution in July 2022 following a fraudulent selection process". Orders were issued for the capture of former ombudsman and opposition candidate for rector Jordán Rodas, former candidate for member of Congress for Semilla Marcela Blanco and Gabriela Dávila, sister of member of Congress Aldo Dávila. The arrest of around twenty university students and professors who opposed Mazariegos was also ordered.

This case raised controversy because the Public Ministry continued with the investigation against the President-elect and Vice President-elect despite the fact that the National Institute of Forensic Sciences of Guatemala determined through an expert report that there were no indications of the alleged participation of Arévalo and Herrera. However, the Public Ministry criticized the results. In early December, prosecutors from attorney general María Consuelo Porras' office called for the results to be officially annulled due to electoral fraud, despite international observers declaring the election to have been free from fraud. This was met with further protests against the Attorney General's office, and further condemnation by international organizations, such as the United Nations and the Organization of American States.

In 2023, Porras's final attempt to block the inauguration by alleging fraud was taken to the Constitutional Court of Guatemala, who denied Porras's attempt to block the inauguration and later issued an order to guarantee Arévalo's inauguration. In January, it issued another order giving immunity to the Vice President-elect, Karin Herrera, who had been repeatedly under risk of being arrested by Porras. Despite this, however, Porras has continued to target former members of the TSE, and arrested former Interior Minister David Napoleón Barrientos Girón for his refusal to violently disperse protests against Porras.

Arévalo is the son of Juan José Arévalo, the 24th president of Guatemala from 1945 to 1951, making him the first son of a former Guatemalan president to be elected president.

== Planning ==
=== Preparations and invitations ===
The swearing-in ceremony of President-elect Arévalo and Vice President-elect as well as the logistics of the activities was planned by the Ministry of Foreign Affairs, the Secretariat of Social Communication of the Presidency, and Congress's Commission of Protocol. Diplomat and former ambassador Iván Espinoza Farfán was selected as the general coordinator of the commission.

A press conference was given on 18 December by Espinoza Farfán and Kevin López Oliva, secretary of social communication of the Presidency in which the full schedule of inaugural events was revealed as well as a web platform so that media could accredit the journalists designated to cover the ceremony. That same month, invitations began to be sent to heads of state and government. A total of 28 heads of state were invited.

=== Security ===
The National Civil Police (PNC) collaborated with other institutions such as the Municipal Transit Police (PMT) of Guatemala City and the Guatemalan Armed Forces to ensure tranquility and a secure environment. According to Minister of the Interior, Byron René Bor Illescas, a total of 9,000 PNC agents were deployed and covered strategic points such as the National Palace of Culture, the Miguel Ángel Asturias Cultural Center, Congress, and the Metropolitan Cathedral. Colonel Rubén Téllez, the spokesperson for the Guatemalan military, indicated that more than 28 thousand soldiers helped assist with the security measures.

==== Transit restrictions and site closures ====
The PMT began a 'special operation' on 12 January that included events and protocol acts in different parts of Guatemala City. Some initiatives included:

- The dispatch of 800 traffic agents.
- The deployment of 5,000 temporary street signages.
- Modifications to traffic regulations at key points where preparations and protocol acts will be developed, these being: the hotel area in Zone 10, Historic Center and Civic Center, and the Plaza de la Constitución ('Constitution Plaza').

== Inaugural events ==
=== Pre-inaugural events ===
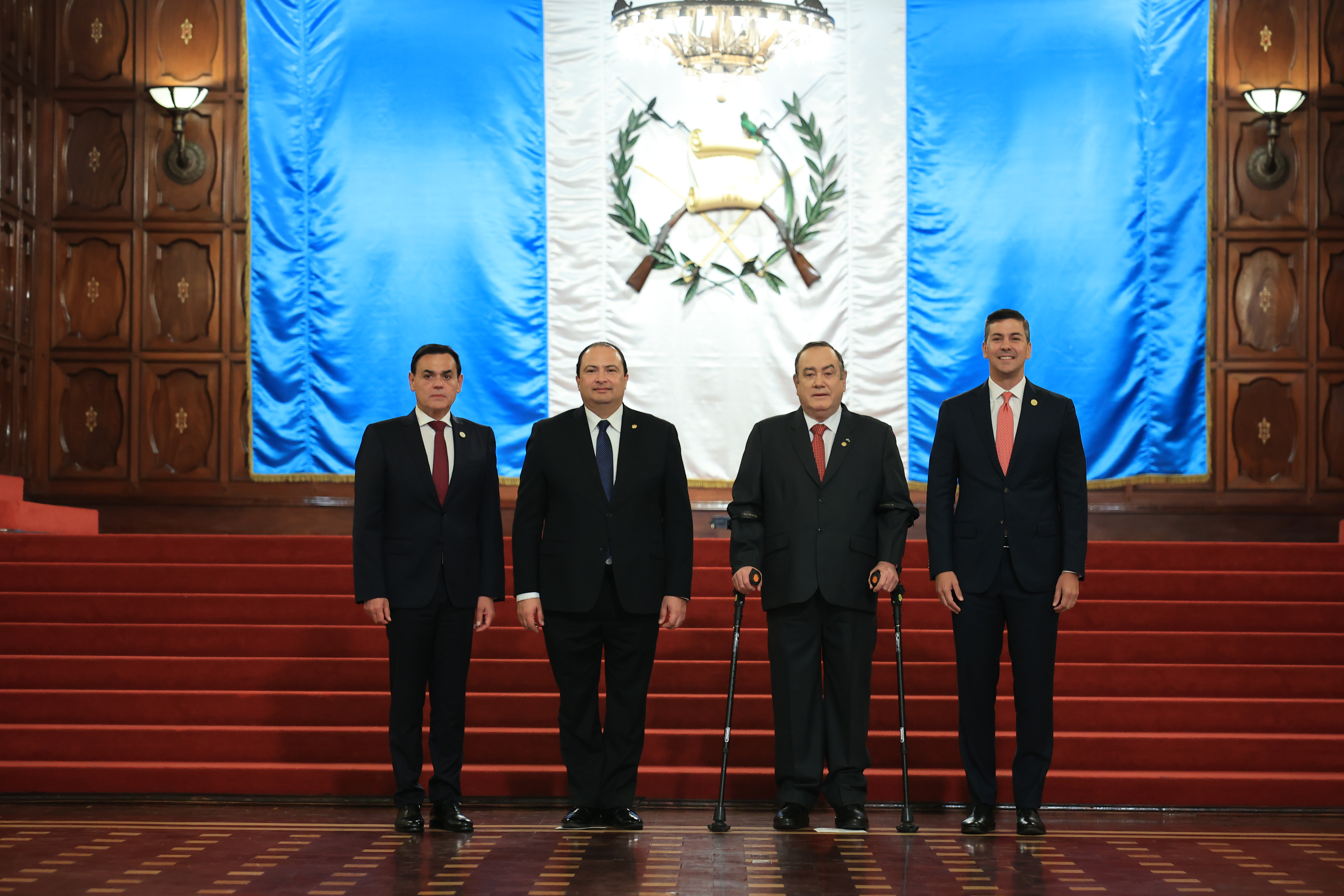
Alejandro Giammattei and Mario Búcaro greet Santiago Peña, president of Paraguay, January 13, 2024

On 13 January, invited heads of states were scheduled to arrive in the country. Due to the number of guests, some will arrive through La Aurora International Airport and others through the headquarters of the Guatemalan Air Force. At 6:00 pm CT, outgoing president Alejandro Giammattei and Minister of Foreign Affairs Mario Búcaro received the international delegates in the Banderas Room of the National Palace and offered a banquet.

On the morning of 14 January, the 10th Legislature of the Congress of the Republic was sworn in and elected Samuel Pérez as President of the Congress. Additionally, the new board of directors of the Congress and appointments to the Label Commissions were also made, although the election of the Board was delayed for nine hours by the Constitutional Court voting to suspend Semilla as a registered party, which caused negotiations on the status of Semilla as a bloc in Congress. The final government report of the Giammattei administration was also read.

=== Attendance ===
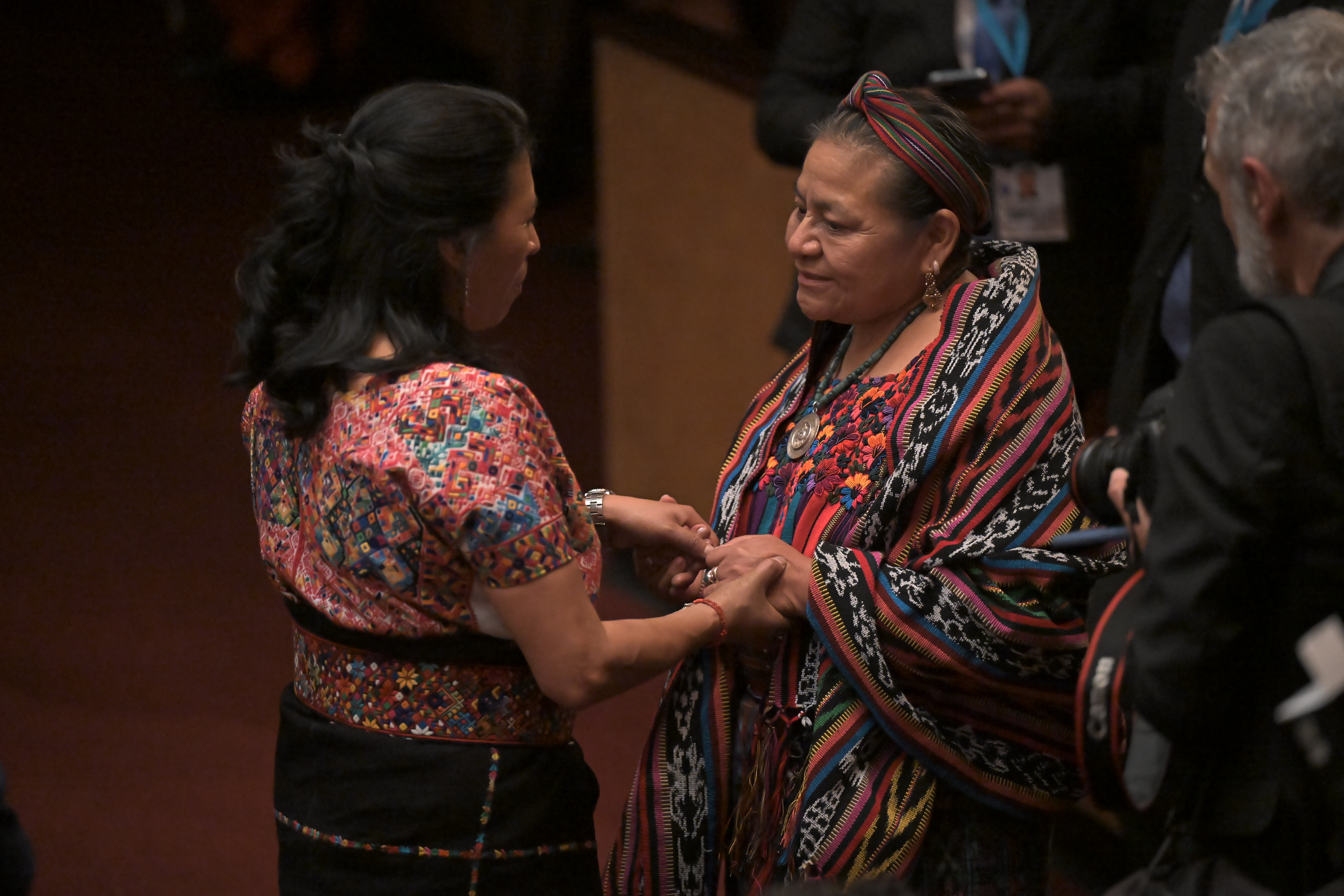
Human rights activist Rigoberta Menchú (left) greets Miriam Roquel Chávez, incoming minister of Labor and Social Welfare, 15 January 2024

Outgoing Vice President Guillermo Castillo, former president Vinicio Cerezo, and former vice president Eduardo Stein attended the inauguration. Former deputy of Congress Sandra Morán, Nobel Peace Prize laureate, Rigoberta Menchú, and Jacobo Árbenz Vilanova, son of former president Jacobo Árbenz, also attended the ceremony.

Outgoing President Alejandro Giammattei did not attend the ceremony—becoming the first outgoing president in Guatemala's democratic era to do so. In a post made on X, Giammattei announced that he handed over the symbols of the presidency including the presidential sash and pin and key to the Constitution to Congress. They were reportedly delivered in a plastic bag. María Consuelo Ramírez Scaglia, General Secretariat of the Presidency, delivered the report to Congress on his behalf.

=== Ceremony ===
The inaugural ceremony took place at the Centro Cultural Miguel Ángel Asturias on 15 January 2024. As Arévalo and his wife Lucrecia Peinado entered the room, the Guatemalan Army Martial Symphonic Band began a live rendition of Antonio Vivaldi's "La primavera" as a tribute to Lucrecia Hernández Mack, a former deputy of the Congress who was a fan of Vivaldi, and a nod to Guatemala's Ten Years of Spring.

The new President of Congress along with the board of directors and the rest of the deputies of Congress relocated to the Great Hall of "Efrain Recinos" for the ceremony, along with invited heads of state and foreign dignitaries. President-elect Arévalo then made his entrance. Presidential attributes were given to the President of Congress and the oath was administered to President-elect Arévalo and Vice President-elect Herrera.

=== Delay of ceremony ===
On 14 January, the day of the inauguration, the ceremony was delayed as the Congressional leadership commission overseeing the inauguration refused to approve a congressional delegation. The commission had a large number of conservative Arévalo opponents, and they were opposed to the recognition of 23 congresspeople from Arévalo's political party, Semilla, which had been previously and controversially suspended.

Prior to the delay, the ceremony had been scheduled to start at 3:00 pm local time. Arévalo and Herrera were instead sworn in minutes after midnight on 15 January, following external pressure from other countries and internal pressure from protestors outside the congressional building.

==== Oaths of Office ====
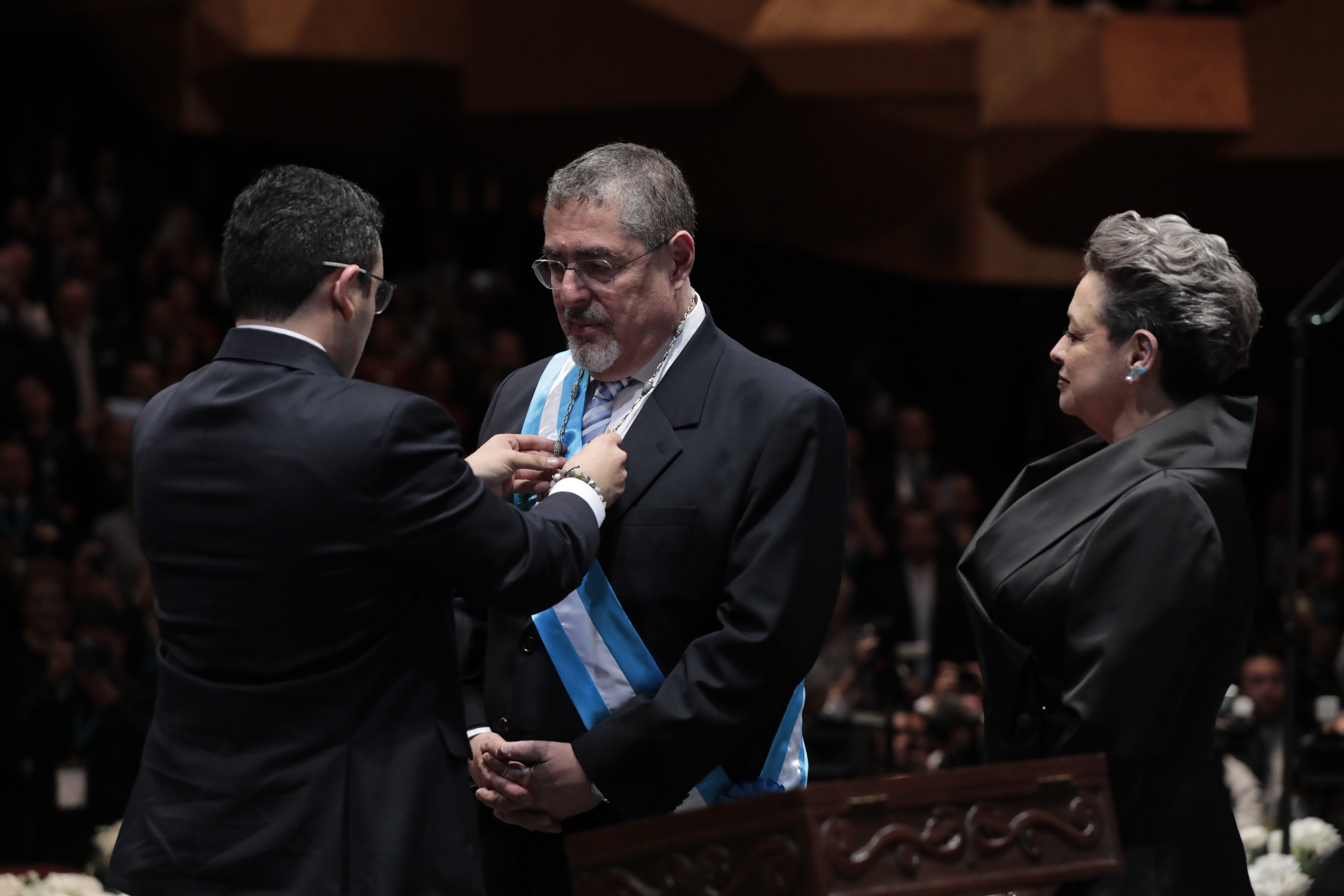
Arévalo is vested with the Key to the Constitution, 15 January 2024

President of the Congress Samuel Pérez administered the oath of office to Arévalo. Lucrecia Peinado held the original copy of the 1985 Constitution, as Bernardo Arévalo placed his left hand on the Constitution and recited the presidential oath. The oath addresses three questions that the President-elect must swear in favor of. Arévalo agreed to the following:

"[Citizen César Bernardo Arévalo de León], do you swear before God and by your honor as a Guatemalan citizen, to be faithful, loyal and obedient to the Constitution of the Republic, comply with it and ensure that it is complied with?

Do you swear to strengthen the rule of law, and for this purpose to comply with, respect, and ensure compliance with the laws of the nation?

Do you swear to fulfill with patriotic love the position of president of the Republic for which you have been elected?"

Pérez ended the presidential oath by appending the following:

"On behalf of the Congress of the Republic and the people of Guatemala represented here, you are legally, legitimately, and solemnly in possession of the position of President of the Republic of Guatemala for the constitutional period 2024 to 2028."

Upon completing the oath, Pérez vested Arévalo with the presidential sash, the necklace containing the keys to the Constitution, and the presidential pin. Interestingly, Arevalo's investiture mirrored that of his father Juan Jose Arévalo as both were administered the presidential oath by the youngest presidents of Congress. Manuel Galich and Samuel Pérez were both 31 when they administered the oath to each president.

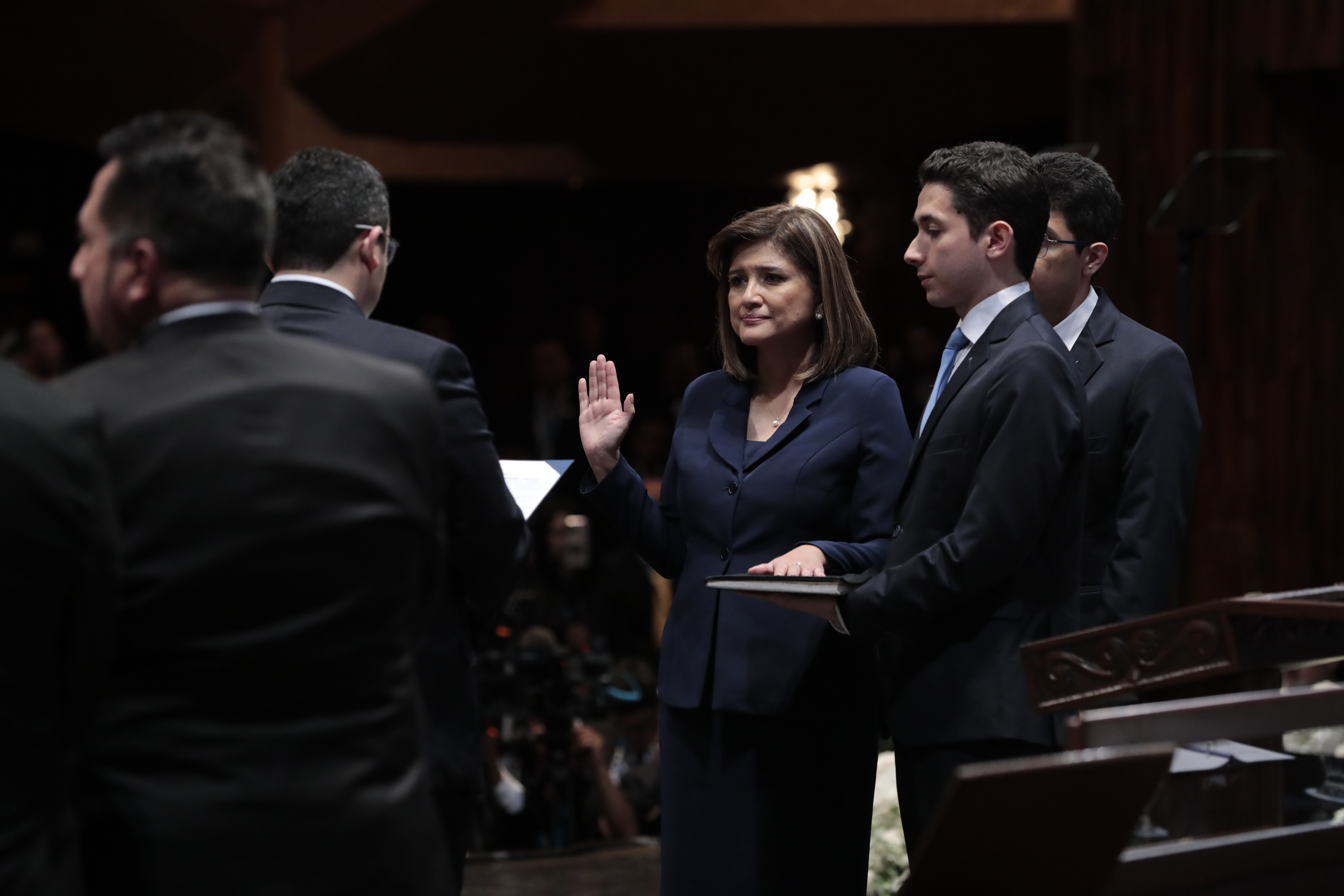
Herrera sworn into office by President of the Congress Samuel Pérez

After Arévalo received the presidential emblems in his honor as the new president, Pérez administered the oath to Vice President-elect Herrera. Herrera was accompanied by her two sons with the eldest holding the 1985 Constitution. Herrera's oath was similar to Arévalo's in which she agreed to the following:

"[Citizen Karin Larissa Herrera Aguilar], do you swear before God and by your honor as a Guatemalan citizen, to be faithful, loyal and obedient to the Constitution of the Republic, comply with it and ensure that it is complied with?

Do you swear to strengthen the rule of law, and for this purpose to comply with, respect, and ensure compliance with the laws of the nation?

Do you swear to fulfill with patriotic love the position of vice president of the Republic for which you have been elected?"

After the swearing-in, Pérez vested Herrera with the vice presidential pin. Shortly after, the signing of the Golden Book of the Congress commenced, with outgoing vice president Guillermo Reyes, President Arévalo, Vice president Herrera, President of the Congress Pérez, along with the newly elected Vice Presidents and Secretaries of the Congress, participating in the process.

==== Inaugural address ====
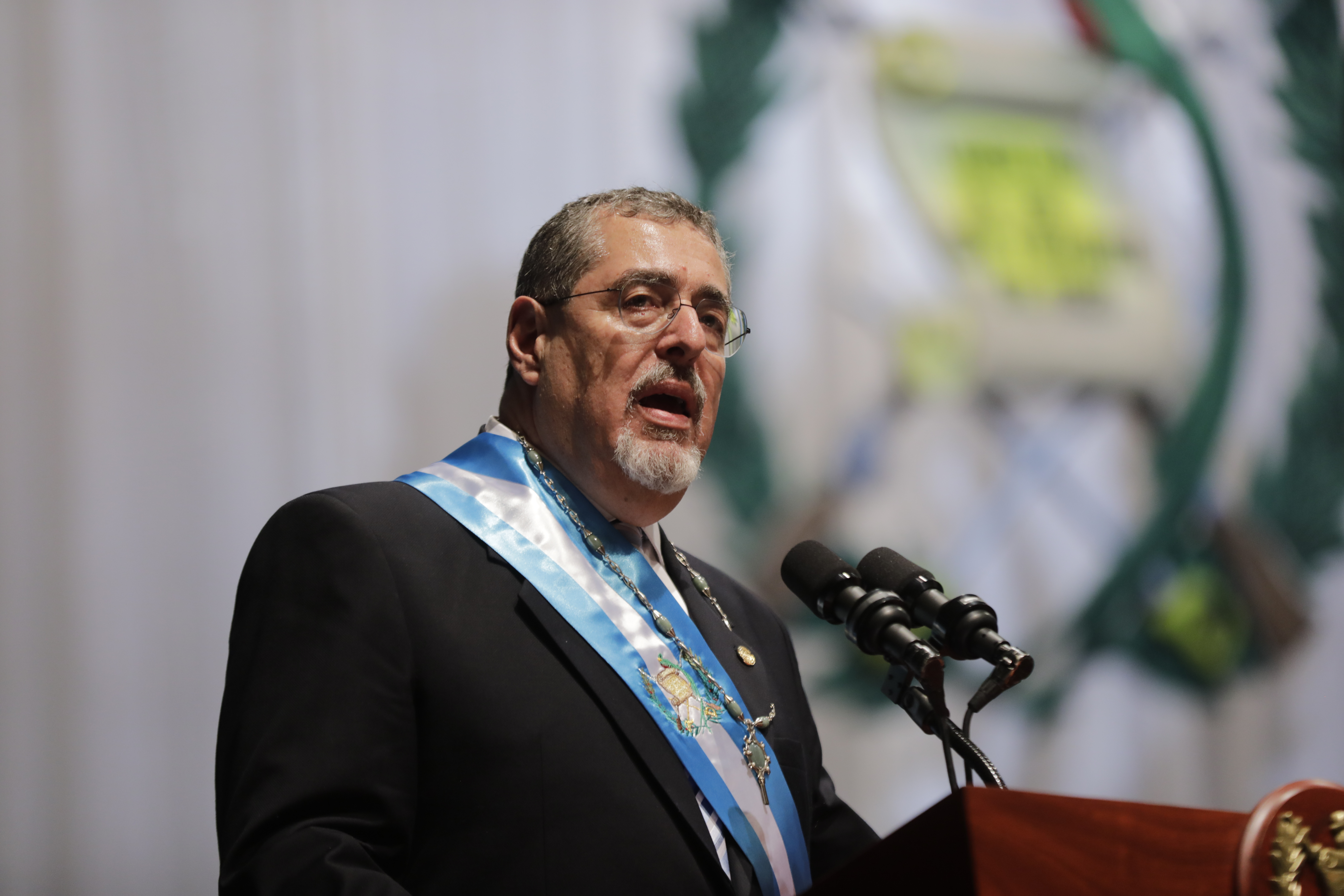
President Arévalo delivering his inauguration speech

President Arévalo delivered his inaugural address at 12:36 am CT. The inaugural address had a length of 2,335 words and President Arévalo took 26 minutes to deliver it. In his speech, Arévalo touched on various topics including the rise of authoritarianism, respect for human rights, compassion for migrants crossing Guatemala, and mitigating the effects of climate change, among other things.

At the conclusion of his speech, participating heads of state took to the stage to greet the new presidential binomial. To conclude the event, Arévalo and his wife, along with Vice President Herrera, left the Great Hall while "La Granadera" (the official anthem of the president) began to play.

President Arévalo delivered his second inaugural address to the nation on the presidential balcony of the National Palace of Culture. Vice President Herrera also gave a speech.

At night, President Arévalo swore in his cabinet inside the National Palace in the Banderas room and posed for their official portraits. Then, Arévalo together with Vice President Herrera received guests and offered a banquet.

=== Subsequent activities ===
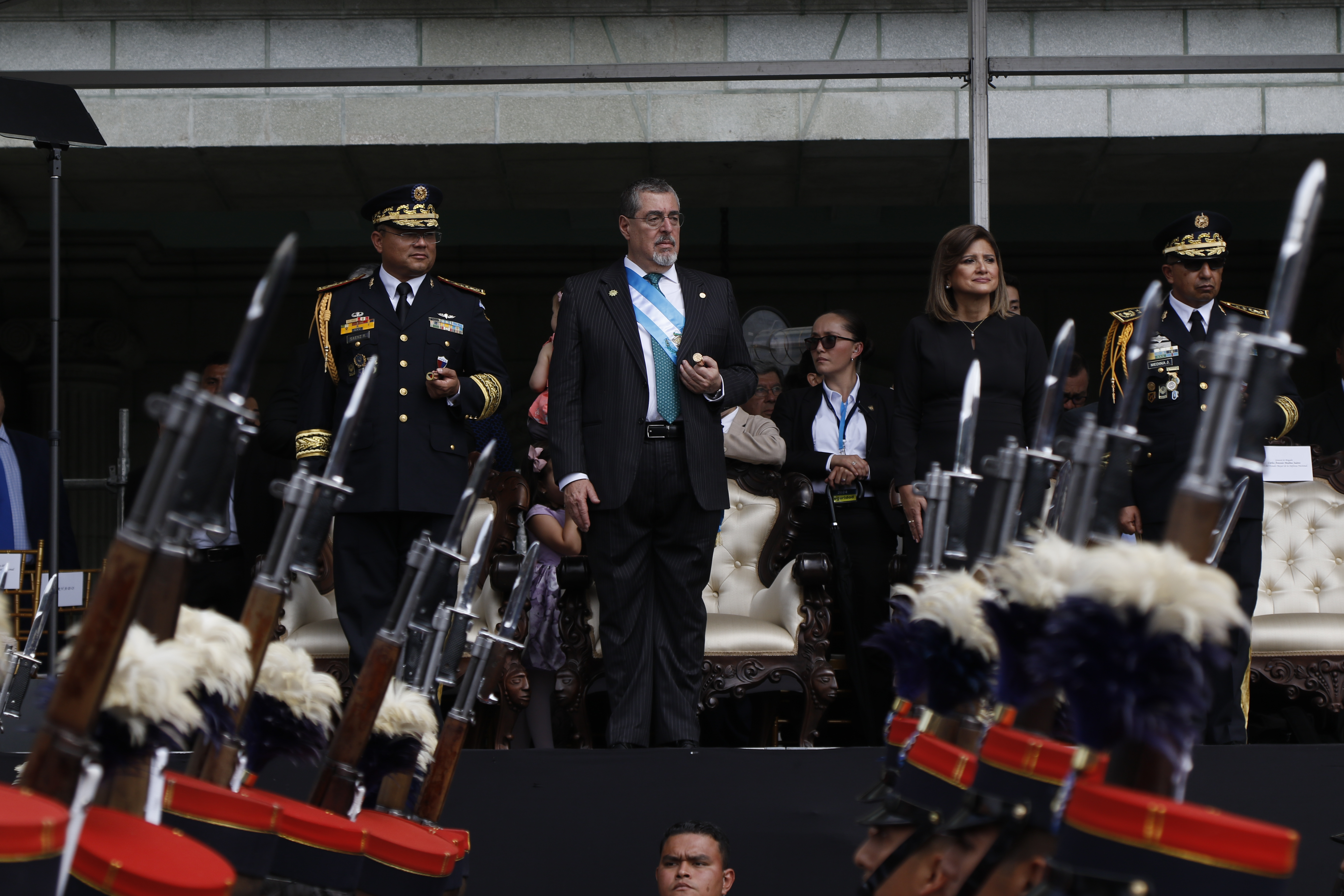
President Arévalo conducts troop review during a ceremony that recognizes him as the commander-in-chief of the armed forces, 15 January 2024

On 15 January, President Arévalo attended a Te Deum in the Metropolitan Cathedral where Archbishop Gonzalo de Villa y Vásquez delivered the sermon.

A few hours later, President Arévalo was presented to the Armed Forces and the National Civil Police at the Constitution Square as their new Commander General and Superior Officer. The Minister of Defense also presented Arévalo with the baton of the Armed Forces and a 21-gun salute was made in his honor.

In the afternoon, President Arévalo and Vice President Herrera attended a religious thanksgiving service in the Central Presbyterian Evangelical Church.

== International guests ==
=== Heads of state and government ===
==== Confirmed ====
- Evelyn Wever-Croes, Prime Minister of Aruba
- Johnny Briceño, Prime Minister of Belize
- Gabriel Boric, President of Chile
- Gustavo Petro, President of Colombia
- Rodrigo Chaves Robles, President of Costa Rica
- Luis Abinader, President of Dominican Republic
- Xiomara Castro, President of Honduras
- Laurentino Cortizo, President of Panama
- Santiago Peña, President of Paraguay
- Felipe VI, King of Spain

==== Invited ====
The President of El Salvador Nayib Bukele was invited, however, he has been absent from his presidential duties since December 2023 to focus on his presidential re-election campaign, and he did also not participate in the inauguration of Javier Milei of Argentina. Vice President of the United States Kamala Harris was also invited but did not attend.

=== Other guests ===
==== Confirmed ====
- Geraldo Alckmin, Vice President of Brazil
- Alicia Bárcena Ibarra, Secretary of Foreign Affairs of Mexico
- Rachid Talbi Alami, Speaker of the House of Representatives of Morocco
- Samantha Power, Administrator of the United States Agency for International Development
