= 2023 Guatemalan general election =

- 25 June 2023 (first round); 20 August 2023 (second round)
- Opinion polls
- Presidential election
- Turnout: 60.78% (first round) ▼1.06pp 44.98% (second round) ▲2.32pp
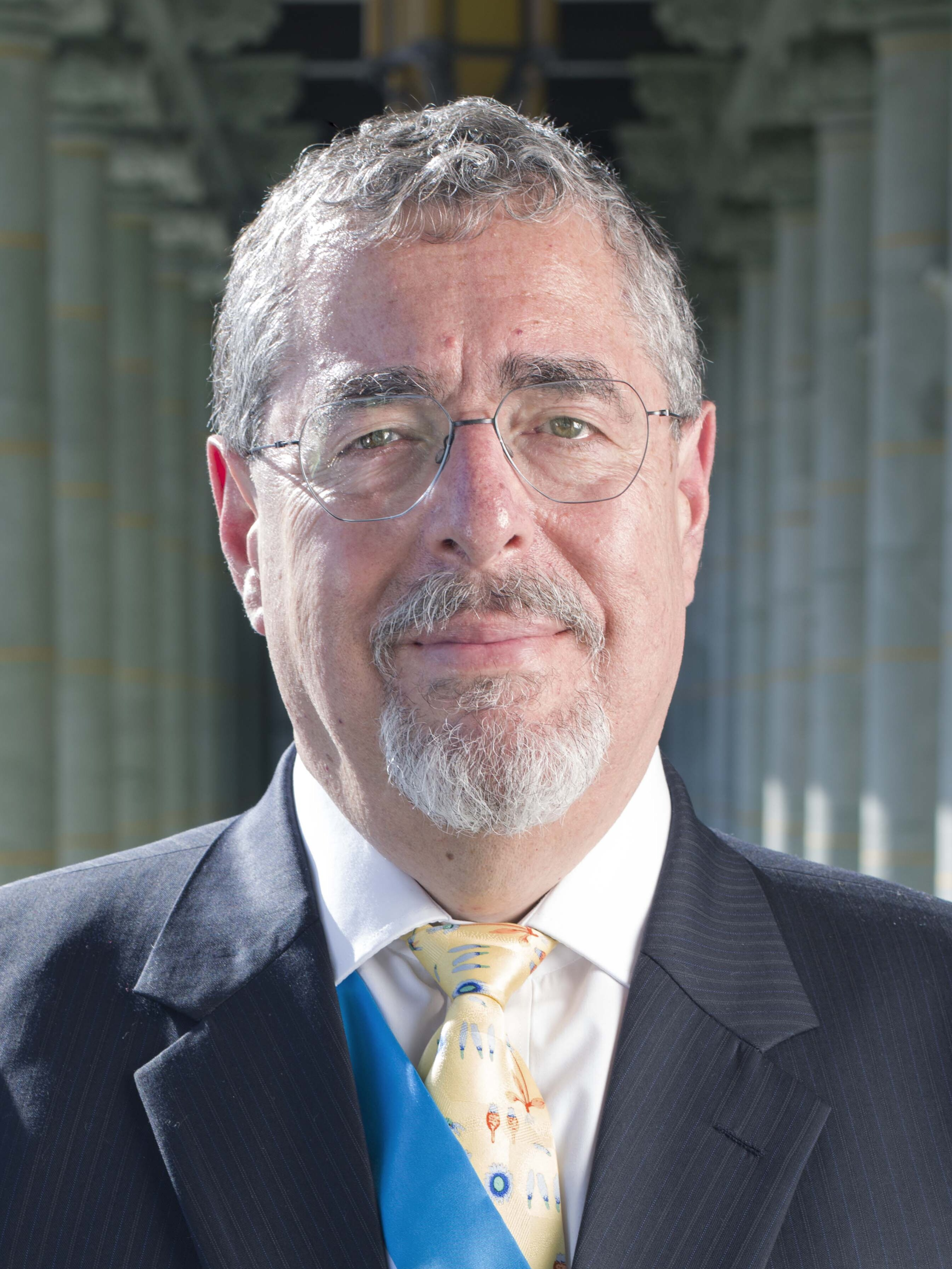

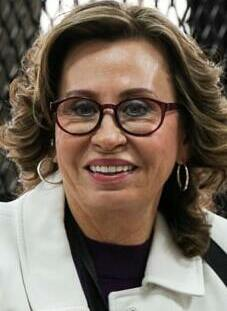
Candidate	Bernardo Arévalo	Sandra Torres
Party	Semilla	UNE
Running mate	Karin Herrera	Romeo Guerra
Popular vote	2,442,718	1,567,664
Percentage	60.91%	39.09%
President before election
Alejandro Giammattei
Vamos
Elected President
Bernardo Arévalo
Semilla
- Legislative election
- All 160 seats in Congress; 81 seats needed for a majority
Party	Leader	Vote %	Seats	+/–
Vamos	Víctor Valenzuela	18.69	39	+22
UNE	Adim Maldonado	15.85	28	−24
Semilla	Jonathan Menkos	14.61	23	+16
Cabal	Julio Héctor Estrada	7.96	18	+18
VIVA	Evelyn Morataya	5.89	11	+4
Valor–Unionist	Álvaro Arzú Escobar	4.84	12	0
VOS	Orlando Blanco	3.78	4	+4
Todos	Felipe Alejos	3.60	6	−1
Winaq–URNG	Sonia Gutiérrez	2.67	1	−6
PPN	Nadia de León Torres	2.50	3	+3
BIEN	Fidel Reyes Lee	2.38	4	−4
Victoria	Juan Carlos Rivera	2.17	3	−1
Blue	Jorge Villagrán	1.95	2	+2
Elephant	Rodrigo Pellecer	1.87	2	+2
CREO	Óscar Chinchilla	1.66	3	−3
Change	Jorge Baldizón	1.02	1	+1
This lists parties that won seats. See the complete results below.
President of the Congress before	President of the Congress after
Shirley Rivera; Vamos	Samuel Pérez; Semilla

General elections were held in Guatemala on 25 June 2023 to elect the president and vice president, all 160 seats in Congress, all 20 members of the Central American Parliament, and mayors and councils for all the country's 340 municipalities. Incumbent president Alejandro Giammattei was constitutionally prohibited from running for a second four-year term. However, as no presidential candidate obtained over 50 percent of the vote in the first round on 25 June 2023, a second round was held between the top two finishers on 20 August 2023: Congressman Bernardo Arévalo (the son of former president Juan José Arévalo) of the Movimiento Semilla and Sandra Torres, a former first lady representing the National Unity of Hope (UNE) party. Arévalo defeated Torres in the second round with nearly 61 percent of the vote in what was seen as a landslide. The ruling Vamos party won the largest number of seats in Congress.

The certification of the first round results by the Supreme Electoral Tribunal was delayed after the Constitutional Court granted an injunction to parties who challenged the results. On 12 July, the Public Prosecution Service (MP) announced that Semilla was suspended for alleged cases of false signatures to establish the party. This action would have prohibited Arévalo's participation in the second round. The following day, the Constitutional Court reversed the suspension, paving the way for the second round of the presidential election to proceed.

President Alejandro Giammattei congratulated Arévalo for his win in the runoff, promising an orderly transition once the results are certified. A key representative of the Organization of American States (OAS), which has a team of 86 election observers in Guatemala, said the runoff voting had gone smoothly. Torres and the National Unity of Hope did not accept the electoral result and alleged electoral fraud in favor of Arévalo.

On 12 September 2023, the Public Prosecution Service opened the boxes containing the electoral ballots. The Supreme Electoral Tribunal condemned the decision and described it as "illegal". The attorney general's office stated that there are "several investigations" against the electoral process. Legally, it is not possible to open electoral boxes and it is only valid with those contested within the time established by law.

On 8 December 2023, the Attorney General's office found "irregularities" in the presidential election and requested that the results be annulled. Prosecutors José Rafael Curruchiche and Leonor Eugenia Morales Lazo announced that they found "altered vote counts" inside ballot boxes and claimed the boxes were not properly secured. Lazo said the irregularities should annul the election for president, Vice President, and Congress. On 14 December, the Constitutional Court, in a 4–1 decision, upheld the results of the election, ordered the Congress to "guarantee" the inauguration of Arévalo, and rejected the moves of the Public Prosecutor to have the elections nullified. However, challenges in the Congress led to delays in the inauguration, which finally took place in the early morning of 15 January.

== Background ==
In July 2021, Attorney General María Consuelo Porras dismissed the head of the special prosecutor's office against impunity, Juan Francisco Sandoval. Sandoval left the country shortly afterwards to 'protect [his] life and integrity'. The Attorney General subsequently increased investigations on judges, lawyers and prosecutors linked to the fight against corruption; several former investigators of the Special Prosecutor's Office against Impunity (FECI) and the International Commission against Impunity in Guatemala (CICIG) were arrested in 2022 and others forced into exile or else continually harassed. Among the exiled judges are Miguel Ángel Gálvez (known for handling the La Línea corruption case) and Erika Aifán (awarded with the International Women of Courage Award in 2021). In September 2021, the United States Department of State announced that it had added Porras to a list of "undemocratic and corrupt" officials. According to the US State Department, Porras "actively undermined" the corruption investigations conducted by Sandoval and his team. Among those sanctioned by the United States are also the Secretary General of the Public Prosecution Service Ángel Pineda and the head of the Special Prosecutor's Office Against Impunity and Porras' right-hand man, Rafael Curruchiche.

At the end of July 2022, the police arrested journalist José Rubén Zamora, founder of the daily El Periódico, and searched the newspaper's headquarters, which had accused President Alejandro Giammattei and Attorney General Consuelo Porras of corruption. Some journalists also went into exile after the Public Prosecution Service began investigations against them. During the trial of José Rubén Zamora in 2023, a judge asked to initiate an investigation against nine journalists. In November 2022, Amnesty International declared Virginia Laparra a "prisoner of conscience". Laparra was one of the jailed anti-corruption prosecutors who was part of Juan Francisco Sandoval's team.

The United Nations and the European Union condemned the investigations of anti-corruption prosecutors in Guatemala and expressed that these procedures "weaken" the rule of law. The International Federation for Human Rights, the World Organisation Against Torture and other NGOs warned in 2022 about the "strengthening of authoritarian rule" in Guatemala and declared that the country was "experiencing an alarming phenomenon of capture and control of public institutions by economic and political elites".

A sharp increase in violent crime and a punishingly high cost of living have made Giammattei deeply unpopular. In January 2022, halfway through his term, Giammattei had a 27% approval rating according to a CID Gallup poll, one of the lowest among the continent's presidents. In 2023, only 2.9% of respondents rate the Giammattei administration as good. Emigration to the United States increased sharply under his presidency.

=== Registration of candidates ===
The registration of candidates for the elections was also clouded by criticism for the "unclear" arguments used by the Registry of Citizens and the magistrates of the Supreme Electoral Tribunal. The ticket of Movement for the Liberation of Peoples was not registered due to "legal problems" of the vice-presidential candidate Jordán Rodas; while Roberto Arzú's candidacy was revoked for allegedly carrying out "anticipated campaigning". Presidential candidate Edmond Mulet was denounced by the Public Prosecution Service for three consecutive days. The first complaint he received was for having spoken out against the investigation of the nine journalists during the Zamora trial, while the other two were for allegedly engaging in "anticipated campaigning" for which reason Mulet's participation is uncertain. The Supreme Court of Justice rejected the challenge, however, on 11 May, the Public Prosecution Service challenged Mulet's candidacy before the Constitutional Court.

On 21 March 2023, the Electoral Tribunal announced that it had rejected the candidacy of the party Commitment, Renewal and Order due to "legal problems" of presidential candidate Francisco Arredondo. The political party filed a legal appeal to reverse the decision of the electoral court, finally, the magistrates accepted the appeal and registered Arredondo as a presidential candidate. The candidacies presented by the Opportunities and Development Party were annulled for not correctly carrying out their nomination assemblies.

Cabal and the URNG–Winaq coalition challenged the candidacy of Zury Ríos before the Registry of Citizens, stating that the Constitution prevented her from running for the presidency because she is the daughter of former president Efraín Ríos Montt who came to power through a coup. Although the appeals were dismissed, Cabal also challenged before the Supreme Court of Justice and the Constitutional Court but they were rejected and Ríos's candidacy remained firm.

Todos challenged the candidacy of Sandra Torres before the Registry of Citizens, the Supreme Court of Justice and the Constitutional Court, affirming that Romeo Guerra, Torres's nominee for vice president, had a constitutional impediment, since the Constitution prevents ministers of worship to running for president and vice president and Guerra was an evangelical pastor before becoming Torres's running mate. The process was rejected by the Electoral Registry and the Supreme Court of Justice. Finally, the Constitutional Court rejected the legal challenge and Torres's candidacy was maintained.

In May 2023, Change challenged the candidacy of Carlos Pineda before the Supreme Court of Justice. The legal filing claimed that there were "irregularities" in the nomination assemblies of Citizen Prosperity. On 19 May, a judge accepted the legal appeal presented, so Carlos Pineda's candidacy was annulled, along with 218 other candidates for deputies and mayors from Citizen Prosperity. On 9 June, a court accepted a legal appeal filed by the Secretary-General of Citizen Prosperity Lilian Piedad García and ordered the registration of lists for candidates for deputies in eleven departments, however, the presidential ticket, the candidates for deputies by National List, the Central District, the Central American Parliament and the other eleven departments, and mayoral candidates remained out of contention. On 11 June, the Constitutional Court revoked the legal recourse granted to the party and ordered the Public Prosecution Service to investigate the court that issued the recourse.

The opposition party Semilla has alleged "irregularities" in a case against it for allegedly forging the signature of a party affiliate. The file was transferred from the Electoral Crimes Prosecutor's Office to the Special Prosecutor's Office Against Impunity led by Curruchiche. Presidential candidate Bernardo Arévalo said that these actions put the party's electoral participation at risk. Deputy Samuel Pérez Álvarez alleged "partiality" on the part of the judicial authorities. He also indicated that in 2015, the Registry of Citizens detected alleged anomalies in almost 12,000 signatures of members of the Progressive Liberator Party (now Valor) and the process has not advanced.

The opposition party Will, Opportunity and Solidarity led by presidential candidate Manuel Villacorta was denounced for allegedly falsifying affiliate signatures in May 2023. Villacorta has previously denounced "systematic attacks" to curb his party's participation.

== Campaign ==
Results from the 2020 Latinobarómetro survey indicated that Guatemala had one of the lowest levels of trust and support for democracy in the region among the electorate: only 37% of citizens considered democracy to be preferable to any other form of government, and 65% were not satisfied with how it operated in Guatemala. In terms of political rights, only 9% of Guatemalans considered that their right to participate in political life is fully guaranteed. The atmosphere of optimism for change that had been present for the elections in 2015 had faded by 2020.

Of the 4.5 million registered citizens aged between 18 and 30, only 2.6 million were on the electoral roll and eligible to vote in 2023.

A substantial number of candidates ran a right-wing campaign, highlighting their attachment to religious values and the defence of private property, as well as their opposition to the legalisation of abortion. In particular, the security policies of Salvadoran President Nayib Bukele were held up as an example to follow. The Evangelical churches continue to have a major influence on political life, having participated in the selection of Supreme Court and Constitutional Court judges, among other things. During the final debate of the campaign, the discussions focused in particular on gay marriage, while the issue of poverty, which affects at least 54% of the population, was ignored. On the contrary, "the discourse and ideas of the left have disappeared from the debate", due to the elimination of the most popular left-wing candidates by the electoral authorities.

The three favourites in the election (Ríos, Torres, and Mulet) made extensive use of clientelist practices. People who came to their meetings were offered various gifts, even a sum of money in the case of Ríos. Political party activists circulate among the ranks, taking down the names and addresses of those present as "primary beneficiaries" in the event of their candidate's victory. Vote buying is a common practice in Guatemalan elections and often goes unpunished.

After proceeding to the run-off, Torres focused on winning over conservative voters, particularly supporters of Ríos. Torres expressed her opposition to same-sex marriage and instead promoted family values. She accused Semilla of being a "socialist" and "communist" party. She accused her second round opponent, Arévalo, of being a puppet of both former attorney general Thelma Aldana and Colombian defense minister Iván Velásquez. Aldana and Velásquez together had investigated corruption cases in Guatemala for the International Commission against Impunity in Guatemala. Political analyst Luis Mack noted that Torres's attacks against Arévalo were an appeal to religious conservatives and the far-right, both of which opposed anti-corruption efforts and foreign interference in Guatemala. Torres also accused Arévalo of wanting to expropriate private property and end religious freedom in favor of an "LGBT ideology".

=== Fraud allegations ===
Some political parties and their presidential candidates such as Amílcar Rivera (Victory), Arévalo (Semilla) and Manuel Villacorta (Will, Opportunity and Solidarity) openly expressed the possibility of electoral fraud. Adding to these denunciations were the excluded presidential candidates Thelma Cabrera (Movement for the Liberation of Peoples), Roberto Arzú (Podemos) and Pineda (Citizen Prosperity), the last of whom saw a steep rise in opinion polls in April 2023, placing him within the top three finishers.

Journalist Andrés Oppenheimer compared the electoral fraud accusations in Guatemala to Donald Trump's attempts to overturn the results of the 2020 United States presidential election.

== Electoral system ==
=== President ===
The President of Guatemala is elected using the two-round system.

=== Congress ===
The 160 members of Congress are elected by two methods; 128 are elected from 22 multi-member constituencies based on the departments, with the remaining 32 elected from a single nationwide constituency. Seats are elected using closed list proportional representation, with seats allocated using the D'Hondt method.

District	Seats
Alta Verapaz	9
Baja Verapaz	2
Chimaltenango	5
Chiquimula	3
El Progreso	2
Escuintla	6
Guatemala	19
Guatemala City	11
Huehuetenango	10
Izabal	3
Jalapa	3
Jutiapa	4
National List	32
Petén	4
Quetzaltenango	7
Quiché	8
Retalhuleu	3
Sacatepéquez	3
San Marcos	9
Santa Rosa	3
Sololá	3
Suchitepéquez	5
Totonicapán	4
Zacapa	2
Total	160

== Presidential candidates ==
Party	Presidential candidate	Vice presidential candidate (Note: Same party as the presidential candidate, unless mentioned in parentheses)	Date declared
UNE	Sandra Torres; First Lady of Guatemala (2008–2011)	Romeo Guerra	8 January 2023
Blue; Party	Isaac Farchi; Member of the Congress (1996–2000)	Mauricio Zaldaña	4 December 2022
Valor Unionist	Zury Ríos (Valor); 2nd Vice President of the Congress (2000–2004); Member of the Congress (1996–2012)	Héctor Cifuentes (Unionist); Member of the Congress (2000–2004); Minister of Labor (1997–1998)	11 December 2022
Cabal	Edmond Mulet; Head of MINUSTAH (2006–2007; 2010–2011); President of the Congress (1992–1993); Member of the Congress (1982–1993)	Máximo Santa Cruz	11 December 2022
Todos	Ricardo Sagastume; Minister of Economy (2015)	Guillermo González	23 October 2022
Vamos	Manuel Conde; Member of the Congress (2016–2024); Member of the Central American; Parliament (1991–1996)	Luis Antonio Suárez	7 January 2023
PHG	Rudio Lecsan Mérida; Member of the Congress (1996–2000; 2020–present); Head of PNC (2000–2001)	Rubén Darío Rosales; Mayor of Santa María Cahabón (2008–2012)	10 December 2022
Republican; Party	Rafael Espada; Member of the Central American; Parliament (2012–2016); Vice President of Guatemala (2008–2012)	Arturo Herrador	14 January 2023
National; Integration; Party	Luis Lam Padilla; Ambassador to the United Nations (2019–2022)	Otto Marroquín	8 January 2023
Elephant; Community	Hugo Peña	Hugo Jhonson	11 February 2023
Victory	Amílcar Rivera; Mayor of Mixco (2004–2012)	Fernando Mazariegos	15 January 2023
Semilla	Bernardo Arévalo; Member of the Congress (2020–2024); Ambassador to Spain (1995–1996); Deputy Minister of Foreign Affairs (1994–1995)	Karin Larissa Herrera	22 January 2023
FCN	Sammy Morales	Miguel Ángel Moir	12 February 2023
PPN	Rudy Guzmán	Diego González; Member of the Congress (2020–present)	22 January 2023
Republican; Union	Giulio Talamonti; Director of the Penitentiary System (2009)	Oscar Barrientos	29 January 2023
URNG Winaq	Amílcar Pop (Winaq); Member of the Central American; Parliament (2020–present); Member of the Congress (2012–2020)	Mónica Enríquez (URNG)	29 January 2023
CREO	Francisco Arredondo; Minister of Public Health (2012)	Francisco Bermúdez Amado; Minister of Defense (2005–2006)	26 February 2023
BIEN	Giovanni Reyes	Oscar Figueroa	12 February 2023
VIVA	Armando Castillo; 3rd Vice President of the Congress (2020–2022); Member of the Congress (2020–2024)	Édgar Grisolia	11 February 2023
My Family	Julio Rivera Clavería; Deputy Minister of the Interior (1988–1989; 2012)	José Urrutia Estrada	18 March 2023
Change	Álvaro Trujillo Baldizón; Member of the Congress (2012–2016)	Miguel Ángel Ibarra; Deputy Minister of Foreign Affairs (2008–2010)	5 February 2023
VOS	Manuel Villacorta; Ambassador to Israel (1999–2000)	Jorge Mario García España	26 February 2023

=== Rejected ===
Party	Presidential candidate	Vice presidential candidate	Date declared
MLP	Thelma Cabrera	Jordán Rodas; Ombudsman (2017–2022)	28 December 2022
Podemos	Roberto Arzú	David Pineda	11 December 2022
PODER	Óscar Rodolfo Castañeda; Minister of Agriculture (2000); Member of the Congress (1996–2000)	Luis Adrián Ruiz; Deputy Minister of Communications (2012)	19 March 2023
PC	Carlos Pineda	Efraín Orozco	5 February 2023

=== Declined ===
==== Parties ====
The following political parties did not run for a presidential ticket, but did run candidates for deputies and mayors.

- Guatemalan People's Party (PPG)
- National Advancement Party (PAN)

==== Individuals ====
- Alfonso Alonso, Minister of Environment and Natural Resources (2018–2020) (National Convergence Front)
- Marcos Antil, immigrant rights activist (Will, Opportunity and Solidarity)
- Manuel Baldizón, member of Congress (2004–2008) (Change) (running for re-election)
- Neto Bran, Mayor of Mixco (2016–present) (Guatemalan People's Party) (running for re-election)
- Juan Carlos Eggenberger, businessman (Together) (running for Mayor of Guatemala City for National Advancement Party)
- Javier Hernández, member of Congress (2016–present) (National Convergence Front) (running for re-election)
- Antonio Malouf, Minister of Economy (2020–2022) (Humanist Party of Guatemala/Citizen Prosperity)
- Jordán Rodas, Ombudsman (2017–2022) (Semilla–Winaq–URNG) (running for Vice President for Movement for the Liberation of Peoples)

== Congress ==
Party	Leader		2019 result	
Party	Leader		Votes (%)	Seats
National Unity of Hope		Adim Maldonado	17.92%	54 / 160
Vamos		Víctor Valenzuela	7.96%	17 / 160
Valor		Álvaro Arzú Escobar	4.55%	9 / 160
Unionist Party		Álvaro Arzú Escobar	2.93%	3 / 160
National Convergence Front		Jimmy Morales	5.23%	8 / 160
Bienestar Nacional		Fidel Reyes Lee	4.79%	8 / 160
Movimiento Semilla		Jonathan Menkos	5.24%	7 / 160
Vision with Values		Evelyn Morataya	4.70%	7 / 160
Todos		Felipe Alejos	4.39%	7 / 160
Winaq		Sonia Gutiérrez	3.50%	4 / 160
Guatemalan National Revolutionary Unity		Sonia Gutiérrez	2.78%	3 / 160
Humanist Party of Guatemala		Laura Mérida	4.66%	6 / 160
Commitment, Renewal and Order		Óscar Chinchilla	4.40%	6 / 160
Victory		Juan Carlos Rivera	2.51%	4 / 160
National Advancement Party		Aníbal Rojas	2.72%	2 / 160
Movement for the Liberation of Peoples		Blanca Julia Ajtún	2.98%	1 / 160
Podemos		Ronald Sierra	1.68%	1 / 160
National Change Union (Note: Party registration cancelled by the Electoral Tribunal in 2019)	—N/a	—N/a	5.46%	12 / 160
Republican Union		Herber Melgar Padilla	New party	
Blue Party		Jorge Mario Villagrán	New party	
Nosotros		Nadia de León Torres	New party	
Cabal		Julio Héctor Estrada	New party	
Change		Jorge Baldizón	New party	
Guatemalan People's Party		Elder Zoel Arévalo	New party	
Republican Party		Carlos Velásquez	New party	
Elephant Community		Rodrigo Pellecer	New party	
National Integration Party		Henry Castillo	New party	
Will, Opportunity and Solidarity		Orlando Blanco	New party	
My Family		Byron López	New party	

== Opinion polls ==
=== Second round ===
Polling firm	Fieldwork date	Sample size	Arévalo Semilla	Torres UNE	Blank/ Null
Second round	20 August 2023	—	60.9%	39.1%	—
Prodatos / Prensa Libre	10–14 August 2023	1,200	64.9%	35.1%	—
Prodatos / Prensa Libre	10–14 August 2023	1,200	53.6%	29.0%	17.4%
CID Gallup	4–13 August 2023	1,819	61.0%	39.0%	—
CID Gallup	18–27 July 2023	1,242	63.0%	37.0%	—
Innovem	20–26 July 2023	3,773	37.8%	45.0%	17.2%

== Results ==
=== President ===
Candidate	Running mate	Party	First round		Second round	
Candidate	Running mate	Party	Votes	%	Votes	%
Sandra Torres	Romeo Guerra	National Unity of Hope	888,924	21.10	1,567,664	39.09
Bernardo Arévalo	Karin Herrera	Semilla	653,486	15.51	2,442,718	60.91
Manuel Conde	Luis Antonio Suárez	Vamos	436,918	10.37		
Armando Castillo	Édgar Grisolia	Vision with Values	397,469	9.44		
Edmond Mulet	Máximo Santa Cruz	Cabal	369,903	8.78		
Zury Ríos	Héctor Cifuentes	Valor–Unionist	366,574	8.70		
Manuel Villacorta	Jorge Mario García	Will, Opportunity and Solidarity	236,886	5.62		
Giovanni Reyes	Óscar Figueroa	Bienestar Nacional	142,129	3.37		
Amílcar Rivera	Fernando Mazariegos	Victory	137,793	3.27		
Amílcar Pop	Mónica Enríquez	Winaq–URNG–MAIZ	88,211	2.09		
Ricardo Sagastume	Guillermo González	Todos	78,503	1.86		
Rudy Guzmán	Diego González	Nosotros	66,962	1.59		
Isaac Farchi	Mauricio Zaldaña	Blue Party	61,544	1.46		
Julio Rivera	José Urrutia	My Family	46,365	1.10		
Francisco Arredondo	Francisco Bermúdez	Commitment, Renewal and Order	43,786	1.04		
Giulio Talamonti	Óscar Barrientos	Republican Union	40,363	0.96		
Hugo Peña	Hugo Johnson	Elephant Community	39,658	0.94		
Rudio Lecsan Mérida	Rubén Darío Rosales	Humanist Party	35,423	0.84		
Rafael Espada	Arturo Herrador	Republican Party	32,497	0.77		
Sammy Morales	Miguel Ángel Moir	National Convergence Front	22,816	0.54		
Álvaro Trujillo	Miguel Ángel Ibarra	Change	18,306	0.43		
Luis Lam Padilla	Otto Marroquín	National Integration Party	7,944	0.19		
Total			4,212,460	100.00	4,010,382	100.00
Valid votes			4,212,460	74.92	4,010,382	95.25
Invalid votes			1,021,607	18.17	147,165	3.50
Blank votes			388,363	6.91	52,687	1.25
Total votes			5,622,430	100.00	4,210,234	100.00
Registered voters/turnout			9,249,794	60.78	9,361,068	44.98
Source: TSE (first round) TSE (second round)

=== Congress ===
Congreso de Guatemala (2023)
Party or alliance		National			District			Total seats	+/–
Party or alliance		Votes	%	Seats	Votes	%	Seats	Total seats	+/–
Vamos		628,126	15.06	6	696,325	15.54	33	39	+23
National Unity of Hope		538,010	12.90	5	571,867	12.76	23	28	–26
Semilla		488,692	11.72	5	430,297	9.60	18	23	+16
Cabal		371,215	8.90	3	401,035	8.95	15	18	New
Vision with Values		288,546	6.92	3	258,605	5.77	8	11	+4
Valor–Unionist	Valor–Unionist	229,861	5.51	2	124,133	2.77	3	5	New
Valor–Unionist	Valor	229,861	5.51	–	197,538	4.41	7	7	–2
Valor–Unionist	Unionist Party	229,861	5.51	–	22,363	0.50	0	0	–3
Will, Opportunity and Solidarity		186,438	4.47	1	178,750	3.99	3	4	New
Todos		169,101	4.05	1	198,893	4.44	5	6	–1
URNG–MAIZ–Winaq	URNG–MAIZ–Winaq	133,694	3.21	1	25,013	0.56	0	1	New
URNG–MAIZ–Winaq	Winaq	133,694	3.21	–	76,137	1.70	0	0	–3
URNG–MAIZ–Winaq	Guatemalan National Revolutionary Unity	133,694	3.21	–	87,687	1.96	0	0	–3
Nosotros		131,217	3.15	1	138,742	3.10	2	3	New
Victory		124,946	3.00	1	126,830	2.83	2	3	–
Bienestar Nacional		112,742	2.70	1	121,488	2.71	3	4	–4
Blue Party		98,487	2.36	1	109,802	2.45	1	2	New
Elephant Community		95,435	2.29	1	90,040	2.01	1	2	New
Podemos		86,475	2.07	0	87,011	1.94	0	0	–1
Commitment, Renewal and Order		84,667	2.03	0	102,421	2.29	3	3	–3
Movement for the Liberation of Peoples		74,802	1.79	0	81,142	1.81	0	0	–1
Humanist Party of Guatemala		61,564	1.48	0	72,059	1.61	0	0	–6
Change		52,754	1.26	0	87,821	1.96	1	1	New
National Advancement Party		45,940	1.10	0	41,594	0.93	0	0	–2
My Family		45,402	1.09	0	44,576	0.99	0	0	New
Republican Union		34,982	0.84	0	34,159	0.76	0	0	New
National Convergence Front		28,827	0.69	0	29,386	0.66	0	0	–8
Guatemalan People's Party		23,837	0.57	0	12,672	0.28	0	0	New
Republican Party		21,658	0.52	0	20,115	0.45	0	0	New
National Integration Party		13,927	0.33	0	12,416	0.28	0	0	New
Total		4,171,345	100.00	32	4,480,917	100.00	128	160	0
Source: TSE (99.13% counted, national votes) TSE

=== Central American Parliament ===
Graph of the party split among 20 seats.
Party	Votes	%	Seats	+/–
Vamos	655,906	17.75	5	+2
National Unity of Hope	594,918	16.10	4	–1
Semilla	425,629	11.52	3	+2
Vision with Values	274,193	7.42	2	+1
Valor–Unionist	256,291	6.94	2	+1
Todos	166,509	4.51	1	–
Will, Opportunity and Solidarity	155,181	4.20	1	+1
Nosotros	131,284	3.55	1	+1
Victory	120,106	3.25	1	+1
URNG–MAIZ–Winaq	118,998	3.22	0	–2
Bienestar Nacional	108,030	2.92	0	–
Elephant Community	100,932	2.73	0	–
Blue Party	95,540	2.59	0	–
Podemos	86,116	2.33	0	–
Commitment, Renewal and Order	81,892	2.22	0	–1
Humanist Party of Guatemala	70,219	1.90	0	–
Change	55,276	1.50	0	–
My Family	48,948	1.32	0	–
National Advancement Party	41,712	1.13	0	–
Republican Union	34,415	0.93	0	–
National Convergence Front	28,930	0.78	0	–2
Guatemalan People's Party	23,435	0.63	0	–
Republican Party	20,666	0.56	0	–
Total	3,695,126	100.00	20	–
Valid votes	3,695,126	65.83		
Invalid votes	1,272,521	22.67		
Blank votes	645,511	11.50		
Total votes	5,613,158	100.00		
Source: TSE (99.10% percent counted)

=== Mayors ===
Party	Number of mayors	Total votes	%
Vamos	132/340		38.82%
Cabal	49/340		14.41%
National Unity of Hope	39/340		11.47%
Civic committees	20/340		5.88%
Todos	15/340		4.41%
Valor	14/340		4.12%
Nosotros	10/340		2.94%
Vision with Values	9/340		2.65%
Valor–Unionist Party	9/340		2.65%
Bienestar Nacional	6/340		1.76%
Podemos	5/340		1.47%
Cambio	5/340		1.47%
Victory	5/340		1.47%
Humanist Party of Guatemala	4/340		1.18%
Commitment, Renewal and Order	3/340		0.88%
Blue Party	2/340		0.59%
Movement for the Liberation of Peoples	2/340		0.59%
Unionist Party	2/340		0.59%
Elephant Community	2/340		0.59%
Guatemalan National Revolutionary Unity	2/340		0.59%
Will, Opportunity and Solidarity	1/340		0.29%
Semilla	1/340		0.29%
Winaq	1/340		0.29%
Guatemalan People's Party	1/340		0.29%
URNG–Winaq	0/340		0.00%
Semilla–URNG	0/340		0.00%
Republican Union	0/340		0.00%
Semilla–URNG–Winaq	0/340		0.00%
My Family	0/340		0.00%
Republican Party	0/340		0.00%
National Convergence Front	0/340		0.00%
National Advancement Party	0/340		0.00%
Opportunities and Development Party	0/340		0.00%
National Integration Party	0/340		0.00%
Source: TSE (99.12% votes counted)

== Aftermath ==
=== First round ===
Map of the number of invalid and blank votes as a share of total votes by municipality in the first round

No presidential candidate obtained more than 50% of the vote in the first round, meaning a second round was required. In an upset, Bernardo Arévalo finished in second place, qualifying for the runoff along with one of the favorites to win, former first lady and 2015 and 2019 presidential runner-up Sandra Torres. Zury Ríos and Edmond Mulet, two other candidates that ranked near the top of opinion polls, finished in 6th and 5th place, respectively.

The first round also saw a record number of invalid ballots, where more than 24% of voters either spoilt their ballots or left their ballots blank entirely. This was attributed to distrust among the electorate towards the electoral system, including the disqualification of some presidential candidates.

==== Ensuing controversies ====
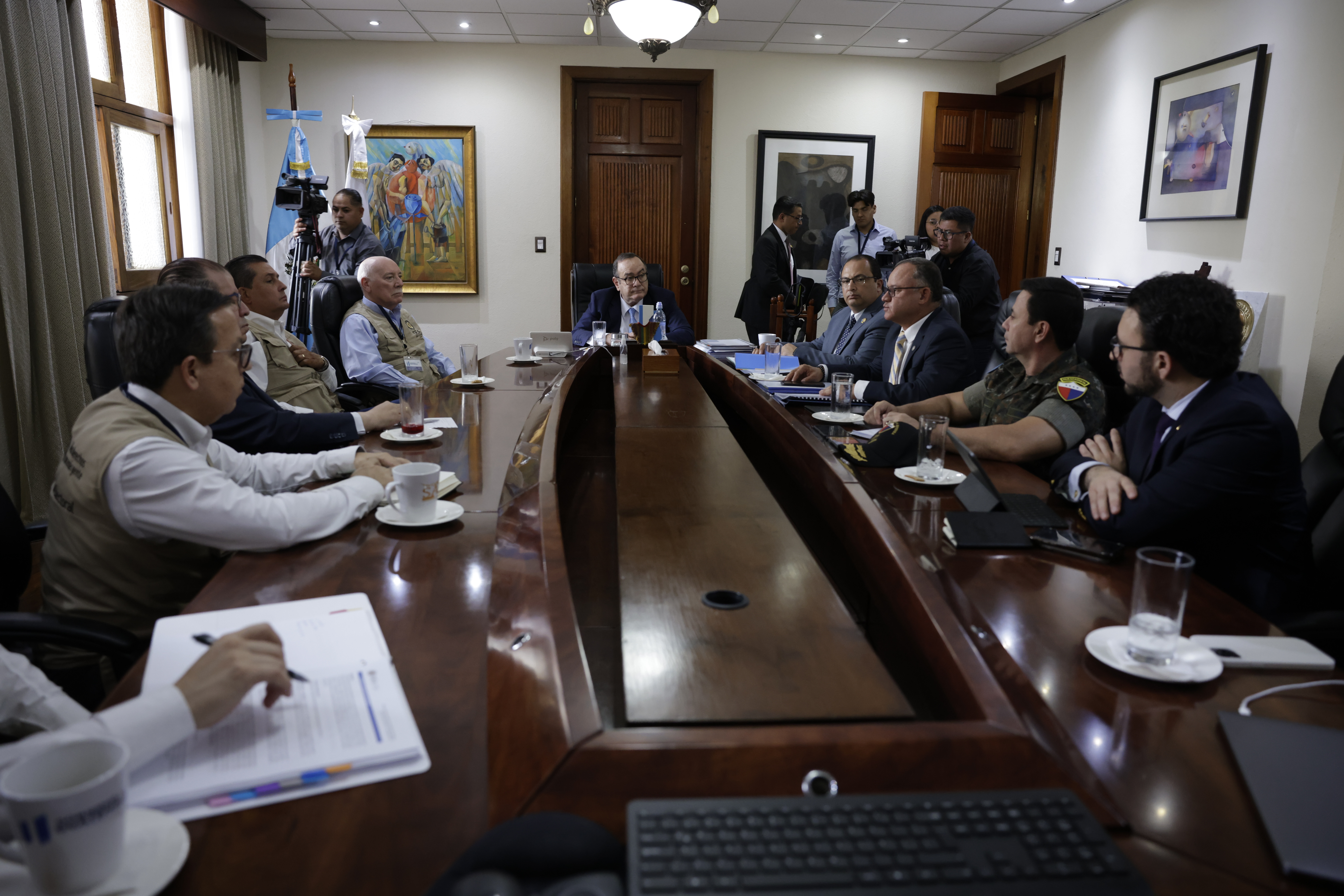
President Alejandro Giammattei and members of his cabinet meet with Eladio Loizaga and an OAS delegation

The official count of the general election by the Supreme Electoral Tribunal indicated that Sandra Torres from National Unity of Hope and Bernardo Arévalo from Semilla would contest the second round. However, the certification of the result by the Supreme Electoral Tribunal was delayed after the Constitutional Court of Guatemala granted an injunction to 10 parties that challenged the result. The court wanted to compare the tallies in the electoral system with the tallies from the polling places. Due to the injunction, the results of the races for president, vice president, all of the seats in Congress and hundreds of local elections remained unofficial. The Electoral Observation Mission in Guatemala, the United Nations, the Organization of American States, the United States, the United Kingdom and the European Union asked the court to respect the electoral results, said that the results matched their observations and denied any accusations of electoral fraud.

The Supreme Court of Justice ruled that the Supreme Electoral Tribunal correctly carried out what was requested by the Constitutional Court and rejected the legal recourse requested by the nine parties, therefore releasing the injunction and permitted the results be made official.

On 12 July, the Public Prosecution Service announced that at their request judge Fredy Orellana had suspended Semilla's legal personality for alleged cases of false signatures to establish the party. However, Article 92 of the Electoral and Political Parties Law establishes that "A party may not be suspended after an election has been called and until it has been held". Previously, member of Congress Samuel Pérez Álvarez of Semilla had announced the possibility of attempting a legal "maneuver" to dissolve the party and thus avoid Arévalo's participation in a second round. The Public Prosecution Service's actions were widely condemned by the private sector, non-governmental organizations, and various foreign governments.

On 13 July, the Constitutional Court reversed the suspension, paving the way for the second round of the presidential election to proceed. Although the Constitutional Court legally favored Semilla, the judge and the Public Prosecution Service continued to pressure the Supreme Electoral Tribunal to cancel the party's participation in the election. Judge Orellana requested the capture of electoral officials with immunity and then ordered a search of the headquarters of the Semilla party. During the raid at the party headquarters, Semilla's legal team, led by Juan Gerardo Guerrero and Ligia Hernández, submitted a petition for personal exhibition in order to clarify the situation of the workers who were inside the facilities. The Supreme Electoral Tribunal requested a legal appeal to the Constitutional Court, affirming that these authorities could attempt to violate the "democratic rule of law" in the future, or the constitutional order.

On 19 August, two days before the runoff, the Supreme Court of Justice granted a permanent injunction to Semilla, blocking a lower court's order suspending the party's legal status.

=== Second round ===
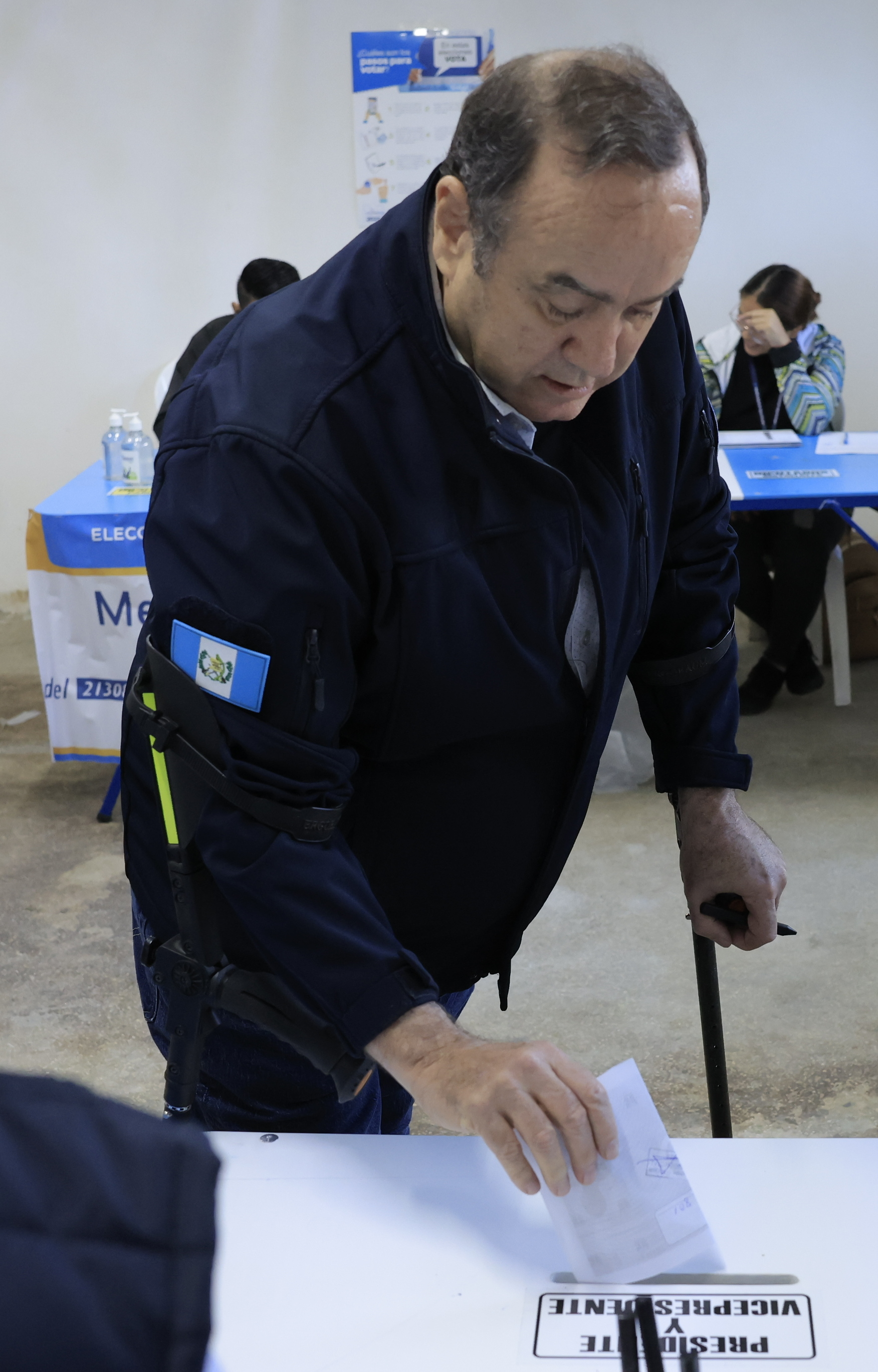
President Giammattei casts his ballot during the second round

Arévalo defeated Torres in the second round with nearly 61 percent of the vote in what was seen as a landslide. It is the first election since the return to democracy in 1985 in which the winning party does not have clientelist networks.

On the day of the second round of the election, there were several bomb explosions at voting centers across the country.

After the results were announced on the night of 20 August, hundreds of citizens congregated in the Obelisco in Guatemala City, as well as the central park of Quetzaltenango to celebrate Arévalo's victory.

On 28 August, the TSE, in a conference, officialized the results of the second round.

=== Reactions ===
==== National and regional ====
President Alejandro Giammattei congratulated Arévalo for his win in a post on X, saying he would "extend the invitation to start the ordered transition the day after the results are official."

Several regional presidents sent their congratulations to president-elect Arévalo, including President Nayib Bukele of El Salvador and President Andrés Manuel López Obrador of Mexico. On 21 August, President Joe Biden of the United States congratulated Arévalo on a post made on X, remarking the "fair and peaceful" election that took place in the second round. That same day, President Xiomara Castro of Honduras and President Daniel Ortega of Nicaragua gave their congratulations to Arévalo and the Guatemalan populace.

Eladio Loizaga, head of the electoral observation mission deployed by the Organization of American States (OAS), said the voting went smoothly and that the election had "fulfilled all the demanding obligations".

Eduardo Núñez, the Guatemala resident senior director for the National Democratic Institute, expected two trends to continue and intensify in the coming days: the country's polarization and the judicialization of the electoral process. He said there will be three key moments: the immediate positions staked out by Semilla and National Unity of Hope party about the results; then on 31 October, when Guatemala's electoral process officially ends and Semilla will no longer enjoy the legal protection that would keep it from being cancelled, and finally on 14 January, when Giammattei is constitutionally mandated to leave office.

Edmond Mulet, who finished fifth in the first round, told Associated Press after Arévalo's victory that he sees at least two possible scenarios in the coming weeks and months, both of which see the cancellation of Semilla's registration. In one, Semilla has its registration cancelled but Arévalo is allowed to assume the presidency without a party. It would have dire effects on his party's representatives in Congress, however, who would be barred from holding leadership positions or leading committees and would already be in minority from the beginning. In the other scenario, the Attorney General's Office succeeds in cancelling the legal status of Semilla, and it makes the argument that because the party was improperly registered, everything that occurred afterward, including Arévalo's nomination, is nullified and he cannot assume the presidency.

==== International ====
- Argentina's Ministry of Foreign Affairs congratulated Arévalo and assurred to "strengthen the historic bonds" of both nations.
- Bolivian President Luis Arce congratulated and wished success to Arévalo through a post made on X.
- Colombian President Gustavo Petro on a post made on X, congratulated Arévalo on his electoral win.
- Cuban President Miguel Díaz-Canel sent his congratulations in a post published on X.
- The EU's High Representative of the Union for Foreign Affairs published a statement congratulating Arévalo and Karin Herrera on their win.
- King Mohammed VI of Morocco expressed his congratulations to Arévalo.
- Paraguay's Ministry of Foreign Affairs congratulated and reaffirmed its willingness to strengthen its bonds of "friendship and cooperation" with Guatemala.
- Peru's Ministry of Foreign Affairs congratulated Arévalo's electoral triumph.
- Taiwan's Ministry of Foreign Affairs sent its congratulations through its embassy in Guatemala.
- Venezuela's Ministry of Foreign Affairs expressed its congratulation's towards Arévalo and the election results.

=== Political crisis ===
In August 2023, judge Fredy Orellana issued a ruling to reinstate a suspension of Semilla's party registration. The Registry of Citizens of the Supreme Electoral Tribunal provisionally cancelled the party's registration on 28 August. Semilla filed an appeal, saying the ruling was an attempt to prevent the party's parliamentarians and president-elect from taking office. Semilla had previously been targeted during the 2019 elections, with its presidential candidate, Thelma Aldana, considered the frontrunner, having her candidacy rejected for dubious reasons. She appealed but was denied. On 30 August 2023, President of Congress Shirley Rivera dissolved the parliamentary group of Semilla and declared them "independent". President-elect and member of Congress Bernardo Arévalo was also affected by the decision. On 3 September, the Supreme Electoral Tribunal nullified the suspension of the party's registration through October. The offices of the TSE were also raided several times under the pretense of investigating alleged fraud, despite no evidence being presented.

Shortly after announcing Arévalo as winner, documents were published from the citizens registry suspending Semilla's registration once more, meaning that the members of Congress elected as part of the party would be forced to sit as independents. Arévalo said he would not "give up", and the move was condemned by the Organization of American States. Following several raids on Semilla offices around the country committed by the Public Prosecutor's Office, Arévalo formally suspended his participation in the presidential transition, saying that the raids were "flagrant crimes of abuse of authority for electoral purposes". President Alejandro Giammattei disagreed with the move, stating that the executive branch had nothing to do with it.

Following urging from the international community, Arévalo formally resumed the process on 4 October, despite Attorney General of Guatemala María Consuelo Porras' continued effort to deregister Semilla as a political party, including raids on the Supreme Electoral Tribune's offices. An OAS mediator was named to help manage the transition two days later, with the organisation's observation mission stating that it appeared the actions by prosecutors were intended to keep Arévalo from taking office. Protests in favor of Arévalo also intensified following the Supreme Court of Justice of Guatemala upholding the party's suspension. Schools were subsequently closed across the country, and President Giammattei condemned any violence that might occur.

On 2 November, Movimiento Semilla was officially suspended by the Public Ministry. Indigenous movements vowed to continue to protest, and the United States government stripped the visas of 14 people in the Public Ministry on the same day. The U.S. State Department's Deputy Assistant Secretary for Western Hemisphere Affairs, Eric Jacobstein, stated that the suspension was worrisome as an apparent way to interfere with Arévalo's transition to office. The suspension also means that members of the party elected to the Congress of the Republic of Guatemala under the banner of the party cannot hold leadership positions or chair committees. It also means that the party cannot hold assemblies or carry out administrative procedures.

In mid-November, the Public Ministry requested that the immunity of the President-elect Arévalo and the Vice President-elect Herrera be withdrawn for allegedly participating in the takeover of the facilities of the state university, the Universidad de San Carlos de Guatemala, which occurred between April 2022 to June 2023. This takeover occurred as a result of alleged irregularities that occurred in the elections for rector of the university, where Walter Mazariegos was elected. In 2023, Mazariegos was included on the United States government's Engel List. According to the State Department, Mazariegos "undermined democratic processes or institutions by accepting the position of rector of the public education institution in July 2022 following a fraudulent selection process". The capture of former ombudsman and opposition candidate for rector Jordán Rodas, former candidate for member of Congress for Semilla Marcela Blanco and Gabriela Dávila, sister of member of Congress Aldo Dávila, were ordered. The arrest of around twenty university students and professors who opposed Mazariegos was also ordered.

This case raised controversy because the Public Ministry continued with the investigation against the President-elect and Vice President-elect despite the fact that the National Institute of Forensic Sciences of Guatemala determined through an expert report that there were no indications of the alleged participation of Arévalo and Herrera. However, the Public Ministry criticized the results. In early December, prosecutor's from Porras' office called for the results to be officially annulled due to electoral fraud, despite international observers declaring the election to have been free from fraud. This was met with further protests against the Attorney General's office, and further condemnation by international organizations, such as the United Nations and OAS again.

In 2023, Porras' final attempt to block the inauguration by alleging fraud was taken to the Constitutional Court of Guatemala, who denied Porras her attempt and later issued an order to guarantee Arévalo his inauguration. In January, it issued another order giving immunity to the Vice President elect, Karin Herrera, who had been repeatedly under risk of being arrested by Porras. Despite this, however, Porras has continued to target former members of the Supreme Electoral Tribunal, and arrested former Interior Minister David Napoleón Barrientos Girón for his refusal to violently disperse protests against Porras.

The planned Inauguration of Arévalo would be delayed on 14 January as well as a result of infighting over who the overseeing commission would select for the congressional delegation. On the same day, clashes between erupted between Arévalo's supporters and riot police, while Semilla representatives were reportedly detained inside Congress. A nine-hour delay of the inauguration of Arévalo and Herrera caused by a delay of the inauguration of incoming deputies, due to a judicial order earlier in the day by the Constitutional Court stripping Semilla of party status. Led by Semilla leader Samuel Pérez, the Semilla deputies negotiated a deal to be recognized as a bloc in Congress and elect Semilla deputies to congressional leadership, including the Board of Directors and the Debate Board. The deal secured a majority of 92 votes against a rival bid by Shirley Rivera, and Pérez was elected president of the Board. The Board members were elected and sworn in minutes before midnight, which then allowed for Congress to proceed with the inauguration of Arévalo and Herrera. The swearing-in of the new President and Vice President would eventually be held in minutes after midnight 15 January 2024, with Pérez officiating.

== See also ==
- List of elections in 2023
