= Manuel Conde Orellana =

Guatemalan politician

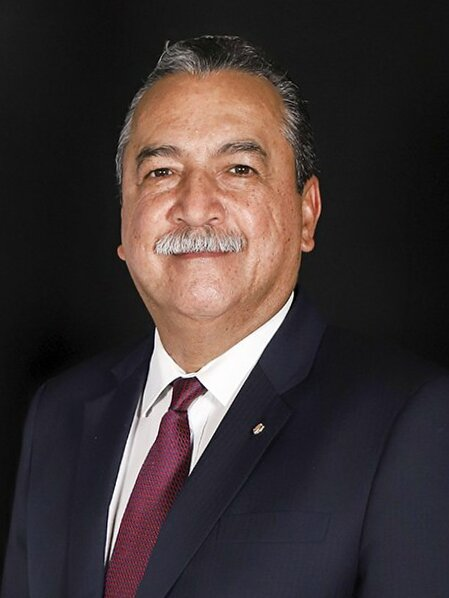
- Official portrait

Member of the Congress of Guatemala
- In office 14 January 2016 – 14 January 2024
- Constituency: National List

Personal details
- Born: December 20, 1956 (age 69)
- Party: Vamos
- Other political affiliations: National Advancement Party
- Education: Rafael Landívar University

Manuel Eduardo Conde Orellana (born 20 December 1956) is a Guatemalan attorney and politician who served as a member of the Congress of Guatemala from 2016 to 2024. Previously, he ran as presidential candidate in the 2003 election and 2007 election.

Conde participated as a presidential candidate in 2023 election for the political party Vamos. He placed third next to Semilla candidate Bernardo Arévalo and former first lady Sandra Torres.
