= Ligia Hernández Gómez =

Guatemalan politician

Ligia Hernández
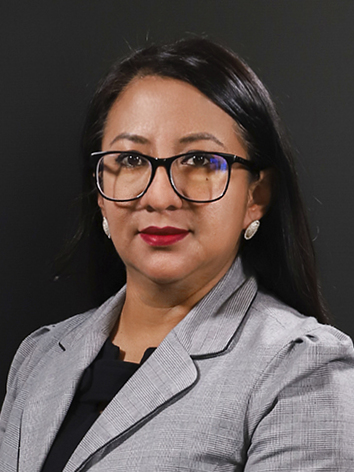
- Official portrait, 2020

General Director of the Victim's Institute
- In office 2 February 2024 – 16 December 2024; Suspended: 13 August 2024 – 9 December 2024
- President: Bernardo Arévalo
- Deputy: Olga Alfaro Pineda
- Preceded by: Alejandra Carrillo
- Succeeded by: Olga Alfaro Pineda (acting)

Member of the Congress of Guatemala
- In office 14 January 2020 – 14 January 2024
- Constituency: Guatemala

Personal details
- Born: 26 September 1981 (age 45) Guatemala City, Guatemala
- Party: Semilla
- Education: Universidad de San Carlos de Guatemala

Ligia Iveth Hernández Gómez (born 26 September 1981) is a Guatemalan attorney and politician. A founding member of Semilla party, she was member of the Congress of Guatemala for Guatemala Department district from 2020 to 2024, having been elected in 2019 general election. After differences within her party, she did not run for re-election in the 2023 general election, although she has participated in the electoral campaign and is part of the party's legal team.

Ligia Iveth Hernández Gómez was arrested on August 15, 2024, becoming the first official of Bernardo Arévalo's government to be detained on corruption charges. Despite the allegations, Hernández maintains her innocence and denies any involvement in illicit activities. Her arrest has sparked a significant support campaign that has emerged organically, mobilizing citizens and organizations that stand by her integrity and her record as a public servant. This wave of solidarity has been channeled through the website #LibertadParaLigia (https://libertadparaligia.com/), which advocates for her release and highlights the irregularities in her legal process.
