= Roots (political party) =

Roots Raíces
- Leader: Samuel Pérez Álvarez
- Founded: 25 May 2025
- Legalised: 7 September 2026
- Preceded by: Movimiento Semilla
- Ideology: Social democracy Social liberalism Progressivism; Anti-corruption; Reformism
- Political position: Centre-left
- Colors: Cyan; Green; Yellow
- Seats in Congress: 14 / 160

Roots (Spanish: Raíces) is a political party in Guatemala, led by the member of Congress Samuel Pérez Álvarez. Roots calls itself the "refoundation" of the cancelled political party Movimiento Semilla.

Following the de facto disqualification of Movimiento Semilla after the 2023 general election, which resulted in the presidential victory of their candidate, Bernardo Arévalo, its parliamentary group lost the legislative leverage needed to govern effectively. In 2025, a group of Semilla founders spearheaded the creation of a new political party for the 2027 general election, called Roots. Conversely, the faction loyal to President Bernardo Arévalo favored exhausting all legal avenues to restore the original party's legal status. This strategic divide triggered a schism that deepened in 2026 amid public criticism between the president and his allies, on one side, and the leaders of Roots on the other. The division culminated on 7 September 2026, when the Supreme Electoral Tribunal officially registered the new political platform.

In November 2026, Roots moved into opposition to Bernardo Arévalo's government.

== History ==
Movimiento Semilla was founded in 2017 and was legalized as a political party in 2018. In the 2019 general election, Semilla nominated Thelma Aldana, former Attorney General of Guatemala, as presidential candidate. However, her candidacy was annulled before it could be officially registered. Despite this setback, the party gained notoriety and won seven seats in Congress.

In the 2023 general election, Semilla nominated Bernardo Arévalo as presidential candidate. His rise was surprising, especially in an electoral context marked by the exclusion of several candidates who were leading in the polls. Against all odds, Arévalo advanced to the runoff. Just days after his qualification, the Attorney General of Guatemala announced investigations into Semilla, alleging irregularities in the party's registration process and calling for its cancellation. These actions sparked widespread national and international concern, as many viewed them as attempts to undermine the electoral process. Although the Constitutional Court guaranteed the participation of both runoff candidates, it did not resolve the legal dispute regarding Semilla's status. Arévalo ultimately won the presidency, but the Attorney General's Office continued to pursue investigations, including allegations of electoral fraud.

Despite the legal uncertainty, Arévalo took office in January 2024. However, Semilla remained effectively dissolved and never regained its official status. The party's cancellation severely weakened the ruling party in Congress. The party's members of Congress were declared independents, stripping them of formal influence in legislative affairs.

After several unsuccessful efforts to restore Semilla's legal standing, in May 2025, a faction led by deputy Samuel Pérez Álvarez announced the formation of a new political party. This move triggered a dramatic split within the Semilla bloc: only 14 of its 23 deputies supported the new initiative, while the remaining nine —closer to President Arévalo and Minister of Social Development Abelardo Pinto— opted not to join and publicly criticized the project.

On 25 May 2025, a new party, named Roots, held its founding assembly, a key step toward legal recognition and participation in the 2027 general election. The party calls itself the "refoundation" of Semilla and upholds its principles, ideology, and leadership. Several founding members of Semilla, including economist Alberto Fuentes Knight, along with the party's largest territorial bases, joined Roots.

The rift between Semilla and Raíces widened in 2026, marked by a public exchange of criticism between President Bernardo Arévalo and Raíces leader Samuel Pérez regarding Arévalo's perceived "passivity".

Rather than seeking reconciliation with its former allies, Semilla faction explored alliances with the Guatemalan National Revolutionary Unity (URNG) and the emerging party Somos Dignidad. The split also resonated among founding members: former Environment Minister Patricia Orantes joined the Raíces faction after resigning from her cabinet post to resume her seat in Congress. Conversely, Minister of Education Anabella Giracca has expressed sympathy for Raíces without formally joining, an attitude largely attributed to her personal loyalty to Arévalo.
