= Marcela Blanco =

Guatemalan politician

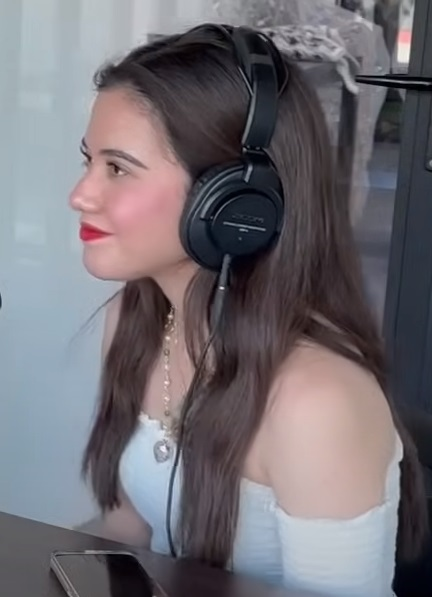
- Blanco in 2023
- Born: February 5, 2000 (age 26); Guatemala City, Guatemala
- Education: Rafael Landívar University
- Political party: Roots
- Other political affiliations: Semilla

Andrea Marcela Blanco Fuentes (born 5 February 2000) is a Guatemalan activist and politician.

== Early life and education ==
Blanco graduated from the Rafael Landívar University in Communication Sciences and is in the process of obtaining a master's degree in public administration at the same university.

== Political career ==
Blanco was nominated as a candidate for member of Congress for Guatemala City by the Semilla party in 2023 general election. She occupied ninth position on the list, but she was not elected. According to The Washington Post, Blanco brought "star power" to Bernardo Arévalo's successful presidential campaign, as she helped the Semilla party understand Generation Z's communication codes through TikTok.

While she was still a candidate for member of Congress, she joined the demonstrations calling for the resignation of Walter Mazariegos, rector of the Universidad de San Carlos, the state university. According to the opposition and the United States Department of State, the election of the rector was a "fraudulent process" designed to favor the candidate related to the ruling party.

After her failed candidacy, she became a critic of President Alejandro Giammattei's administration, as well as the Public Ministry's controversial investigations into the 2023 general election.

=== 2023 arrest ===
In November 2023, the Public Ministry requested the arrest of Blanco, along with twenty students and university professors critical of Mazariegos for their support for the demonstrations and the seizure of the facilities of the Universidad de San Carlos. On November 16, Blanco was arrested at her home by agents on charges of corruption. Members of Semilla condemned her arrest, and the Secretary General of the Organization of American States Luis Almagro condemned the arrests of Blanco and other students and university professors. Blanco's arrest helped raise her national profile.

Blanco's case was assigned to Judge Víctor Cruz –Cruz ordered the capture of former 2019 Semilla presidential candidate Thelma Aldana–, who sent Blanco to preventive detention. The Public Ministry presented tweets and videos on TikTok as evidence against Blanco and requested four charges against her: crimes of aggravated usurpation, depredation of cultural property, sedition and illicit association. Cruz dismissed the last two charges and granted Blanco house arrest. The trial is scheduled for June 2024.
