= Juan Gerardo Guerrero =

Guatemalan lawyer and politician

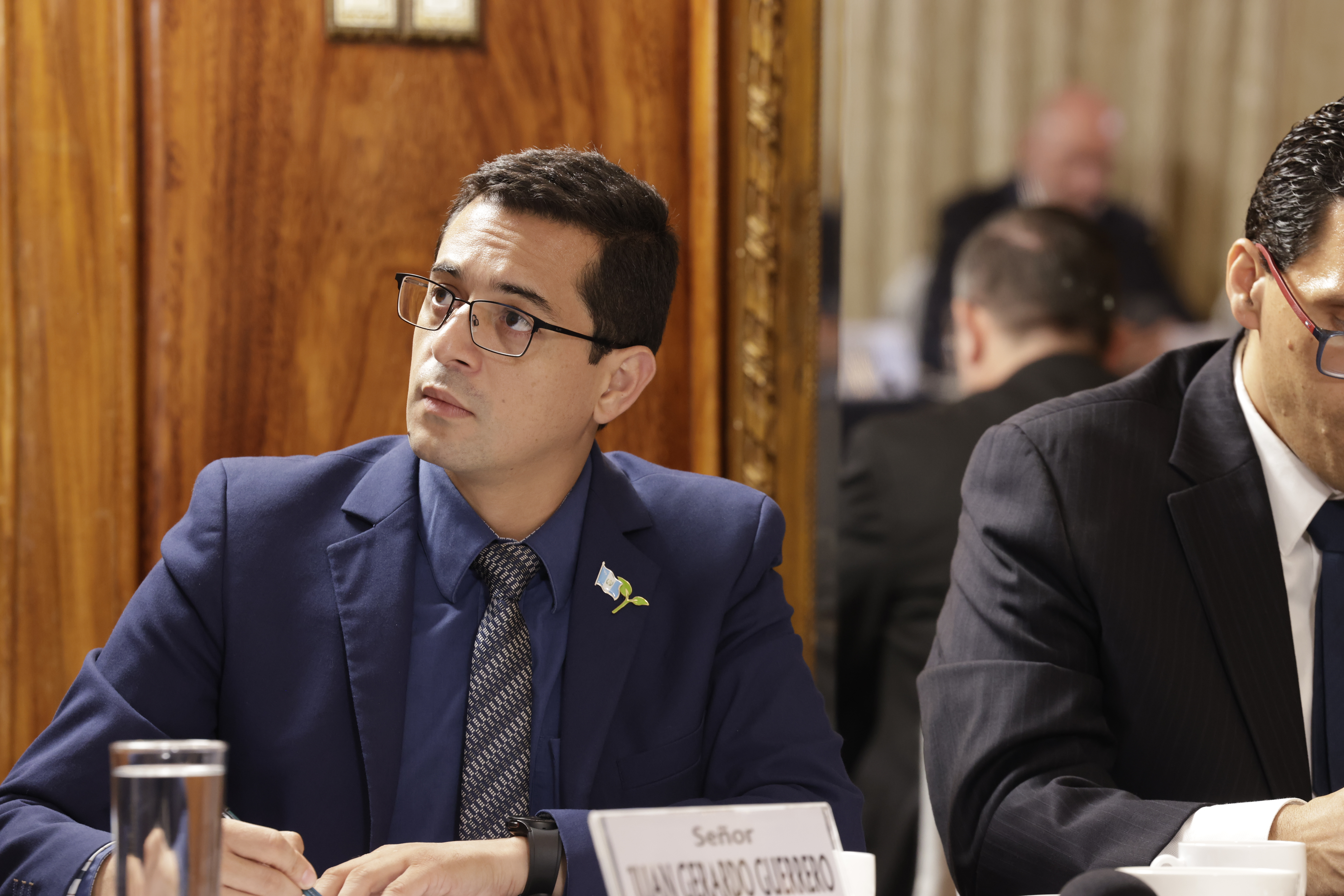

Secretary General of the Presidency of Guatemala
- Incumbent
- Assumed office 15 January 2024
- President: Bernardo Arévalo
- Preceded by: María Consuelo Ramírez

Member of Central American Parliament for Guatemala
- In office 14 January 2020 – 14 January 2024

Personal details
- Party: Semilla
- Education: University of San Carlos of Guatemala, Colegio Cobán

Juan Gerardo Guerrero Garnica is a Guatemalan attorney and politician. A founding member of Semilla party, he served as member of Central American Parliament since January 2020. He led the Semilla party list for the Central American Parliament in 2019 and 2023 general election.

Guerrero gained national notoriety when he assumed the leadership of the legal team of the Semilla party in the 2023 general election, after several actions by the Public Ministry and Judge Fredy Orellana to cancel the legal personality of the party.
