= National Unity of Hope =

National Unity of Hope Unidad Nacional de la Esperanza
- Abbreviation: UNE
- Leader: Sandra Torres
- Spokesperson: Édgar Rosales
- Founded: 6 September 2002
- Split from: New Nation Alternative
- Membership (2023): 89,696
- Ideology: Social conservatism Historical: Social democracy Christian left
- Political position: Centre-right to right-wing; Historical: Centre to left-wing
- Regional affiliation: Center-Democratic Integration
- Continental affiliation: COPPPAL (observer)
- International affiliation: Socialist International (2008–24)
- Colors: Green
- Seats in Congress: 28 / 160

Website
- www.une.org.gt

The National Unity of Hope (Spanish: Unidad Nacional de la Esperanza, UNE) is a populist political party in Guatemala. It was founded in 2002 and defined itself as a social democratic and social-Christian/Christian socialist party, but since transformed and is now described as a right-wing party. It is the largest political party in Guatemala by the number of members.

== Ideology ==
At the time of its founding in 2002, it defined itself as a social-democratic and social-Christian party, but has gradually shifted to the right wing. It opposes lifting abortion and same-sex marriage bans in the country. However, it supports social programs aimed at uplifting the "forgotten" poor of the country.

== Electoral history ==
=== Presidential elections ===
Election	Candidates		First round		Second round		Status
Election	President	Vice President	Votes	%	Votes	%	Status
2003	Álvaro Colom	Fernando Andrade	707,578	26.36	1,046,868	45.87	Lost ✗
2007	Álvaro Colom	Rafael Espada	926,236	28.25	1,449,533	52.81	Won ✓
2011 (Note: Candidate supported also by Grand National Alliance.)	Sandra Torres	Roberto Díaz-Durán	Disqualified				
2015	Sandra Torres	Mario Leal	948,809	19.76	1,328,342	32.56	Lost ✗
2019	Sandra Torres	Carlos Raúl Morales	1,112,939	25.42	1,384,044	42.05	Lost ✗
2023	Sandra Torres	Romeo Guerra	881,592	20.98	1,567,664	39.09	Lost ✗

=== Legislative elections ===
Election	Votes	%	Seats	+/–	Status
2003	457,308	17.92	32 / 158	New	Opposition
2007	720,285	22.84	51 / 158	▲20	Government
2011 (Note: Run in coalition with Grand National Alliance.)	985,610	22.47	48 / 158	▼4	Opposition
2015	676,080	14.83	32 / 158	▼16	Opposition
2019	717,204	17.81	54 / 160	▲22	External support
2023	538,010	12.90	28 / 160	▼26	Opposition (Torres's faction)
2023	538,010	12.90	28 / 160	▼26	External support (Maldonado's faction)

=== 2003 election ===
At the legislative elections held on November 9, 2003, the party won 17.9% of the popular vote and 32 out of 158 seats in Congress. Its presidential candidate Álvaro Colom won 26.4% in the presidential elections on the same day and was defeated in the second round, when he received 45.9%.

=== 2007 election ===
For the 2007 elections, the party again chose Colom as its presidential candidate. He came in first place with 28% of the vote; in the Legislative Election, the party won 22.8% of the vote and 48 seats in Congress, more than any other party. On November 4, 2007, in the second round of the election, Colom was elected President of Guatemala. It would mark the first time since 1954 that Guatemala had a left wing government.

=== 2011 election ===
In the 2011 elections, the Constitutional Court ruled out the candidacy of Colon's ex-wife, Sandra Torres, thus making it the first time in the history of the elections that an official ruling party did not present presidential and vice-presidential candidacies; however, the party won 39 seats in Congress.

=== 2015 election ===
In the 2015 elections held on September 6, 2015, the National Unity of Hope won 19.76% of the vote in the first round and 27 seats in Congress. In the second round (run-off) Presidential candidate Sandra Torres placed second in the presidential race with 32.56% of the vote, eventually losing in the October 25 run-off to Jimmy Morales of the National Convergence Front (FCN/Nation).

=== 2019 election ===
In the 2019 elections held on June 16, 2019, the party again chose Sandra Torres as its presidential candidate. She came in first place in the first round with 25.54% of the vote but lost the second round on August 11, 2019 with 42.05% of the vote to Alejandro Giammattei of the Vamos party; in the Legislative Election, the UNE party won 54 seats in Congress, more than any other party.

=== 2023 election ===
The National Unity of Hope had an internal division between deputies opponents and supporters of Sandra Torres in 2020, caused by Torres's accusations of corruption and poor electoral results in 2019, as well as her support for the government of Alejandro Giammattei. A faction opposing Torres removed her as leader and expelled her from the party in 2021. However, the Supreme Electoral Tribunal ruled in favor of Torres and allowed her to continue as party leader. A few days after the decision of the electoral court, the opposition group to Sandra Torres announced its resignation from the National Unity of Hope, to found the "Parliamentary Opposition Group", in reference to its parliamentary opposition to the Giammattei government.

The Parliamentary Opposition Group approached the Will, Opportunity and Solidarity political party.

After Torres' new electoral defeat, the National Unity of Hope suffered another split in early 2024, when a group of more than 20 members of Congress led by Adim Maldonado (who was Torres's right-hand man in the 2023 campaign) and José Inés Castillo agreed to join a legislative agreement with the government of Bernardo Arévalo. Torres tried to expel Maldonado and Castillo but the decision was annulled by the new legislative majority and she lose control of the legislative bench.

In July 2024, José Inés Castillo resumed his alliance with Torres and began to dispute with Adim Maldonado for the leadership of the party in Congress. Maldonado would have between 15 and 16 members of Congress on his side, while Castillo and Torres have between 12 and 13 deputies in their favor. With this, Torres once again consolidated her leadership within the party.
