= Romeo Guerra =

Guatemalan politician and evangelical pastor

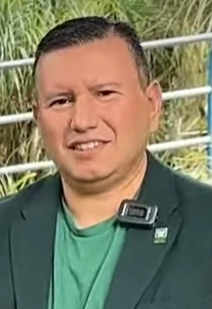
- Born: Romeo Estuardo Guerra Lemus; November 12, 1975 (age 50); Guatemala City, Guatemala
- Education: Galileo University and Latin University of Theology
- Occupations: Pastor and politician
- Political party: National Unity of Hope
- Spouse: Paula María Bianchi
- Parent(s): Romeo Guerra Lemus; Elsa Judith Lemus Bojórquez

Romeo Estuardo Guerra Lemus (born November 12, 1975) is a Guatemalan politician and evangelical pastor.

He was the running mate of presidential candidate and former First Lady of Guatemala Sandra Torres from the UNE in the 2023 Guatemalan general election. On 25 June 2023, Guerra and Torres won the most votes in the first round. They were defeated in the second round by Bernardo Arévalo and Karin Herrera.

As a religious leader he is affiliated with the Zion Christian Church.

== Biography ==
Romeo Guerra was born on November 12, 1975, and he's the eldest son of Romeo Guerra Lemus, who was also pastor and founder of the evangelical congregation "Zion Christian Mission", and his wife Elsa Judith Lemus.

In 1978 his parents converted to Protestantism and from 1982 his father began to lead evangelical congregations as a Pastor in Guatemala and United States, specifically in San Antonio, Texas. They returned to Guatemala in 1994 when Romeo Guerra (father) founded his own congregation.

From 2013 Romeo Guerra (son) became a pastor of the church when his father retired. At the end of 2022 he resigned to enter politics and participate in the 2023 Guatemalan elections with the National Unity of Hope party.

He has been member of the Guatemala Apostolic Council and was vice Chairman of the Guatemala Evangelical Alliance from 2004 to 2008. He was also coordinator of the Youth Commission in the Guatemala Evangelical Alliance from 2006.

He studied at the Latin University of Theology.

He claims in an interview in August 2023 that he had been part of a NASA project, which has been perceived to be untrue.
