= Juan Alberto Fuentes =

Guatemalan economist and politician

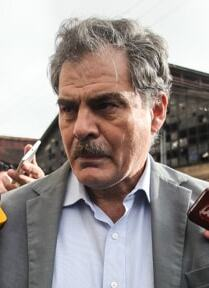

Minister of Finance
- In office January 14, 2008 – June 26, 2010
- President: Álvaro Colom
- Preceded by: Mefi Eliud Rodríguez García
- Succeeded by: Édgar Ballsels

Personal details
- Born: Juan Alberto Fuentes Knight
- Party: Roots
- Other political affiliations: Semilla
- Education: University of Toronto; University of Sussex, PhD

Juan Alberto Fuentes Knight is a Guatemalan economist, politician, and non-profit official. Among other roles, he has served as Minister of Finance in Guatemala and as chairman of Oxfam International.

== Biography ==
Fuentes was born Juan Alberto Fuentes Knight to the economist and politician Alberto Fuentes Mohr. He studied economics at McGill University and the University of Toronto, and received his PhD from the University of Sussex. Fuentes has held positions with the United Nations in Costa Rica, Mexico, Chile, and Guatemala. He was founder and director of the Central American Institute for Fiscal Studies (ICEFI), the first think tank of its kind in the region.

From 2008 to 2010, Fuentes served as Minister of Finance in Guatemala. In this role, he steered the country's finances through the turbulent Great Recession, implementing moderate countercyclical policies to soften the impact of the global economic downturn. He also created a vice ministry dedicated to transparency in use of public funds. Alongside other initiatives, this new vice ministry spurred significant improvement in Guatemala's standing in the International Transparency Ranking, as the country moved up by 12 spots. After his time in office, Fuentes authored a popular book, Rendición de Cuentas (For Accountability), detailing his experiences while leading the Ministry.

Fuentes resigned as Minister of Finance in 2010, citing anomalies in the use of public funds and inability to pass a progressive fiscal reform. He went on to serve as Regional Advisor of the UN Economic Commission for Latin America and the Caribbean (ECLAC) in Mexico City. He then worked as Director of the Division of Economic Development at ECLAC in Santiago, Chile, where he conducted research on macroeconomic challenges and fiscal reform in Latin America and the Caribbean. Following this role, he taught courses in Economics at Universidad Rafael Landívar in Guatemala City, served as an independent consultant on economic integration and political economy, and participated in the organization of a new Guatemalan political initiative called Semilla.

On 13 February 2018, Fuentes was detained, alongside all other members of President Álvaro Colom's Cabinet, as part of a corruption investigation dating back to his time in government. In December 2024, Judge Mario Hichos dismissed the Transurbano case against Colom's Cabinet, ruling that the Public Ministry had failed to present sufficient evidence to proceed to trial and granting a definitive dismissal of the charges against the former officials.

In July 2023, Fuentes announced his self-imposed exile from Guatemala, citing what he described as political persecution related to investigations against members of the Movimiento Semilla party.
