= Guatemalan People's Party =

Guatemalan People's Party Partido Popular Guatemalteco
- Abbreviation: PPG
- Leader: Neto Bran
- Founded: 2020
- Legalised: 27 July 2022
- Dissolved: 8 January 2024
- Split from: Todos
- Ideology: Municipalism; Decentralization
- Political position: Centre-right
- Colors: Blue; Green
- Seats in Congress: 0 / 160

Guatemalan People's Party (Spanish: Partido Popular Guatemalteco) was a political party in Guatemala led by Neto Bran.

== History ==
The mayor of Mixco Neto Bran was part of several political parties, including: the Reform Movement, with which he won the mayor's office in 2015, and Todos, with which he won re-election in 2019.

In November 2020, Neto Bran was appointed secretary general of the Todos party, but after disputes with party founder Felipe Alejos, Bran announced his resignation from Todos in February 2021.

In December 2021, Bran announced his affiliation to the Guatemalan People's Party. The party was legalized in July 2022.

== Electoral history ==
=== Presidential elections ===
Election	Candidates		First round		Second round		Status
Election	President	Vice President	Votes	%	Votes	%	Status
2023	None	None	—	—	—	—	Did not participate

=== Legislative elections ===
Election	Votes	%	Seats	+/–	Status
2023	23,837	0.52	0 / 160	New	Extra-parliamentary
