= Jonathan Menkos =

Guatemalan economist and politician (b. 1975)

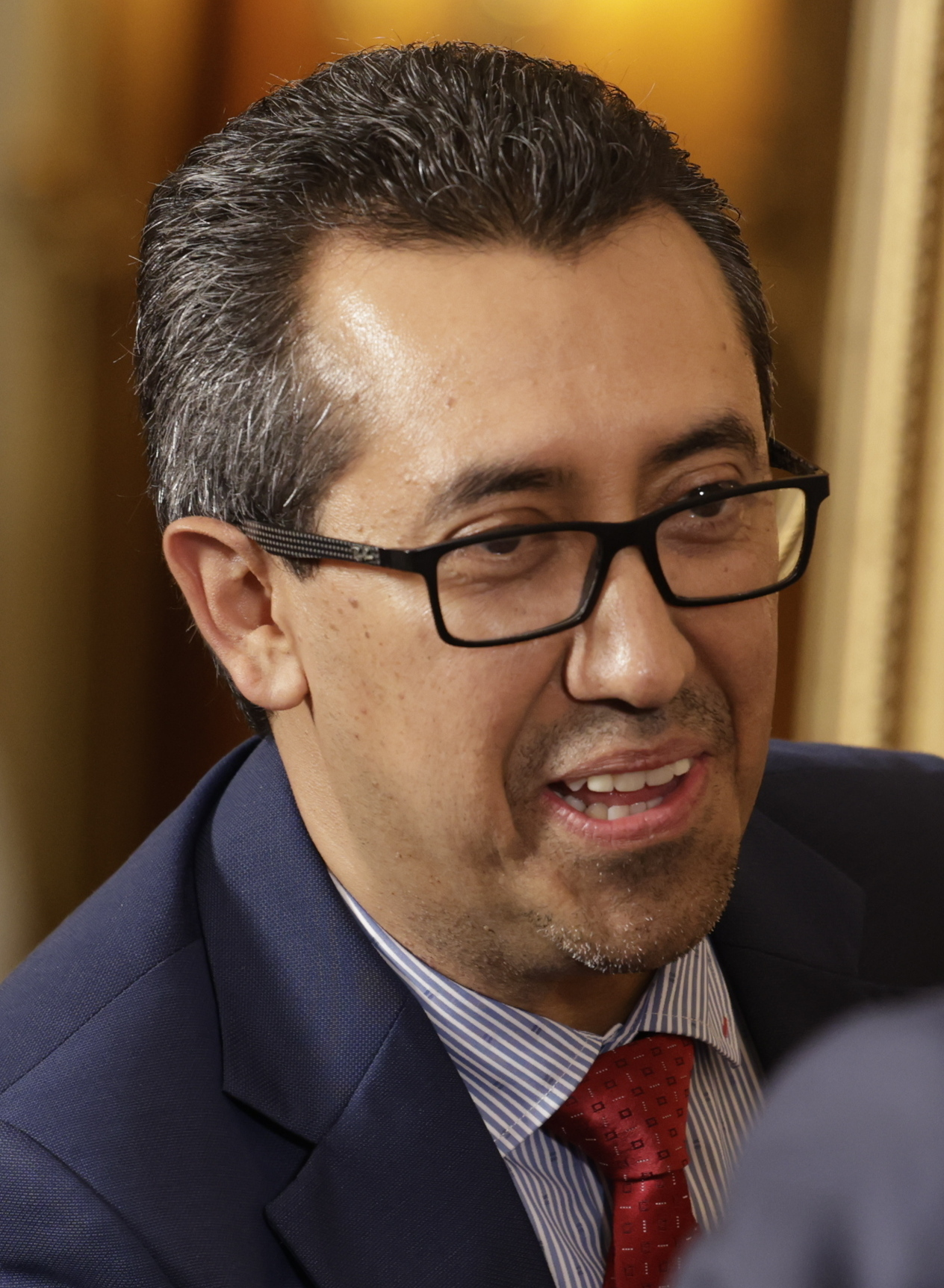
- Official portrait as member of Congress, 2024

Minister of Public Finance
- In office 19 January 2024 – 30 September 2026
- President: Bernardo Arévalo
- Preceded by: Edwin Oswaldo Martínez Cameros
- Succeeded by: Débora Alvarado

Member of the Congress of Guatemala
- In office 14 January 2024 – 19 January 2024
- Succeeded by: Olga Isabel Villalta Pereira
- Constituency: National List

Personal details
- Born: 29 June 1975 (age 51) Guatemala City, Guatemala
- Party: Semilla
- Education: Universidad de San Carlos de Guatemala; Universidad de Valparaíso
- Website: https://jonathanmenkos.org

Jonathan Kiril Thomas Menkos Zeissig (born 29 June 1975) is a Guatemalan economist, politician, writer, academic and analyst who served as Guatemala's Minister of Public Finance since 2024 to 2026. He previously served as president of the Central American Institute of Fiscal Studies (ICEFI) starting September 2012.

On March 5, 2019, the Board of Directors of the Central American Institute of Fiscal Studies announced that Menkos requested a license to be absent from his duties as President of the Central American Institute of Fiscal Studies from March 1 to August 15, 2019. Hours later, the political party Movimiento Semilla announced that Menkos had been elected as its vice presidential candidate and running mate of ex-attorney general Thelma Aldana, however Aldana was disqualified from the presidential race.

Party political offices
New political party	Semilla Movement nominee for Vice President of Guatemala; 2019	Succeeded by Karin Herrera
