= Shirley Rivera =

Guatemalan politician (born 1971)

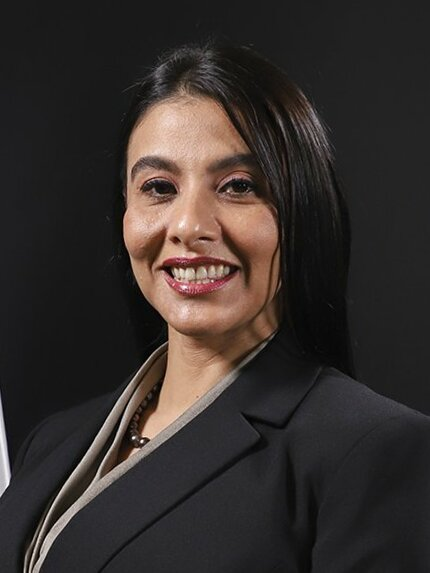
- Official portrait

President of the Congress of the Republic of Guatemala
- In office 14 January 2022 – 14 January 2024
- Preceded by: Allan Rodríguez
- Succeeded by: Samuel Pérez Álvarez

Member of the Congress of the Republic of Guatemala
- Incumbent
- Assumed office 14 January 2020
- Constituency: Guatemala

Personal details
- Born: 22 September 1971 (age 54) Escuintla, Guatemala
- Party: Nuevos Tiempos (since 2025)
- Other political affiliations: Vamos (before 2025)

Shirley Joanna Rivera Zaldaña (born 22 September 1971) is a Guatemalan politician who has been a member of the Congress of the Republic of Guatemala since 2020. She was President from 2022 to 2024, and was the third woman to hold the position and first woman reelected to the position. Originally elected as a member of Vamos in 2019, she left to join Nuevos Tiempos in 2025.

== Early life ==
Shirley Joanna Rivera Zaldaña was born on 22 September 1971. She graduated with a degree in business administration.

== Career ==
In the 2019 election Rivera won a seat in the Congress of the Republic of Guatemala as a member of Vamos. During her tenure in congress she has served on the Technical Support, Women's, Electoral Affairs, and Minors and the Family commissions. She became Deputy Leader of Vamos' bloc in congress in 2020.

On 14 January 2022, Rivera became President of the Congress and was the third woman to hold that position. She was relatively unknown in politics and former president Roberto Alejos first met her during the 2019 election. She was the first woman to be reelected as president of congress. On 17 November 2023, she announced that she would not seek reelection as president.

In 2025, Rivera left Vamos to join Nuevos Tiempos. She was elected general secretary of Nuevos Tiempos.

== Political positions ==
Riveria authored legislation that required media outlets to warn viewers if anything in their broadcast mentioned violence, gender reassignment, and sexual identity variations. She supports restoring capital punishment in Guatemala. Rivera supports Israel.

== Works cited ==
=== News ===
- "Diputados presentan iniciativa para reactivar la pena de muerte". Radio Emisoras Unidas. 1 February 2023. Archived from the original on 3 July 2025.
- "Guatemalan Congressional Israel Allies Caucus marks fifth anniversary". Jewish News Syndicate. 11 July 2022. Archived from the original on 12 August 2023.
- Alvarez, Nancy (17 November 2023). "Shirley Rivera no buscará reelección en Presidencia del Congreso". Radio Emisoras Unidas. Archived from the original on 3 July 2025.
- Cuevas, Douglas (6 December 2021). "Las polémicas iniciativas que promueve Shirley Rivera, la nueva presidenta del Congreso". Prensa Libre. Archived from the original on 8 January 2022.
- Cuevas, Douglas (29 November 2021). "Shirley Rivera, el futuro del oficialismo en el Congreso". Prensa Libre. Archived from the original on 9 January 2022.
- Loarca, Heidi (27 April 2025). "De Vamos a Nuevos Tiempos, Shirley Rivera lidera partido político recién inscrito". La Hora. Archived from the original on 3 July 2025.
- Rojas, Alex (19 October 2021). "Shirley Rivera: "El respeto a nuestras autoridades va a hacer la diferencia"". Prensa Libre. Archived from the original on 30 November 2022.

=== Web ===
- "Diputada Shirley Rivera, Primera Mujer En Ser Reelecta Presidente Del Congreso". Congress of Guatemala. 14 January 2023. Archived from the original on 3 July 2025.
- "Shirley Joanna Rivera Zaldaña". Congress of Guatemala. Archived from the original on 26 June 2025.
