= Sandra Torres =

Guatemalan politician (born 1955)

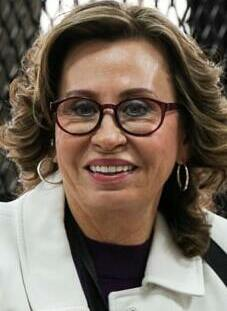
- Torres in 2020

General Secretary of the National Unity of Hope
- In office 20 May 2012 – 31 August 2021

First Lady of Guatemala
- In role 14 January 2008 – 7 April 2011
- President: Álvaro Colom
- Preceded by: Wendy de Berger
- Succeeded by: Rosa Leal de Pérez

Personal details
- Born: Sandra Julieta Torres Casanova; 5 October 1955 (age 70) Melchor de Mencos, Petén, Guatemala
- Party: National Unity of Hope
- Other political affiliations: Authentic Integral Development (1993–2000)
- Spouse: Álvaro Colom (m. 2002; div. 2011)
- Children: Nadia de León Torres (daughter)
- Education: University of San Carlos of Guatemala (BA); Rafael Landívar University (MPP)

Sandra Julieta Torres Casanova (locally ['sandɾa xu'ljeta 'tores kasa'noβa]; born 5 October 1955) is a Guatemalan politician who served as the first lady of Guatemala from 2008 to 2011, as the wife of president Álvaro Colom. As the candidate of the National Unity of Hope party, Torres ran for president in 2015, 2019 and 2023, coming in second place in each election.

== Early life and education ==
Sandra Julieta Torres Casanova was born on 5 October 1955, in the municipality of Melchor de Mencos, in the department of Petén. She is the daughter of Enrique Torres and Teresa Casanova. She has a degree in Communication Sciences from San Carlos University. She also has a master's degree in Public Politics from Rafael Landívar University.

== Career ==
She has spent most of her professional lifetime promoting politics, plans, programs, projects and laws concerning social development, especially of women, children and people with special needs. Within the legal initiatives that she has promoted from inside her political party – the National Unity of Hope (UNE) – (of which her former husband was the Leader and in which she is also a director) are:

1. Initiative of Law Against Feminicide. Approved in the first semester of 2008.
2. Initiative of Law of Responsible Parenting. Approved in August 2008.

Sandra Torres de Colom was founder of the Coordinadora Nacional de la Mujer (National Coordinator of the Women) for the political party Unidad Nacional de la Esperanza, through which more than 30,000 Guatemalan women (Garifuna and Xinca amongst them) have channeled their specific demands. The action in favor of women was reflected within the corporate area. Sandra Torres, as a businesswoman, worked at private companies and had been responsible for textile production and administration of clothing factories. She also was president of Consejo de Cohesión Social (Council of Social Cohesion), an institute in charge of orienting social investment for the eradication of extreme poverty and combating poverty in general. The group employs programs and projects focused on improving the coverage and quality of education, healthcare, infrastructure, sustainability and national reconstruction (specifically pertaining to the disasters Hurricane Stan, landslides in La Unión, Zacapa, and Storm 16).

=== Presidential candidate ===
During the 2008 presidential term of her husband Álvaro Colom, she had a proactive role in many social programs, creating a platform for the distribution of government aid to the poor. She became quite popular among the poor and hence she decided to run for president in the 2011 general election. However, she was disqualified from being a candidate since the Constitution of Guatemala, article 186(c), prohibits relatives of the incumbent president and Vice president from running as candidates. Even though she divorced her husband President Álvaro Colom, the move was seen as an attempt to circumvent the electoral law.

With no restrictions from the Constitution she was able to run in the presidential election of 2015 as a candidate for the same political party that her ex-husband was elected, the social-democratic National Unity of Hope party (UNE). This time she finished second in the first round of the election on 6 September, narrowly beating the third-placed Manuel Baldizón, and qualifying for the runoff against first-placed Jimmy Morales. She lost the election in the second round.

She ran again in the 2019 presidential election, and led in some polls, though she had faced a legal challenge by the Constitutional Court over potential campaign finance violations. during the last election, which she denied. Torres says she would provide "comprehensive solutions like development, fight against poverty and job opportunities" to try to convince Guatemalans to stay in the country rather than migrating to the United States. Torres pledged health and education reforms as well as jobs to stem the flow of migration to the US. In an appeal to more conservative voters, she vowed to oppose abortion and same-sex marriage. She did not attend either the first round or second round debates, despite having been invited to both. She was defeated in the second round of the 2019 presidential election by Alejandro Giammattei.

Torres ran again in the 2023 presidential election. On 12 July, the Public Ministry announced that Semilla's legal personality was suspended for alleged cases of false signatures to establish her party. This was reversed by the Constitutional Court, paving the way for the second round of the presidential election to proceed. Later that month she visited Washington, D.C. She finished in first place in the first round alongside running mate Romeo Guerra. She was defeated in the second round by Bernardo Arévalo.

=== Arrest and case dismissal ===
On 2 September 2019, she was arrested at her home on charges of violating campaign finance rules. In 2022, however, the case was dismissed by a judge.

Honorary titles
Preceded by Wendy de Berger	First Lady of Guatemala; 2008–2011	Succeeded by Rosa Leal de Pérez
Party political offices
Preceded by Álvaro Colom	National Unity of Hope nominee for President of Guatemala; 2011 (withdrew), 2015, 2019, 2023	Most recent
Preceded by Jairo Joaquín Flores	General Secretary of the National Unity of Hope; 2012–2021	Succeeded by Oscar Argueta
