= Adim Maldonado =

Guatemalan politician (born 1990)

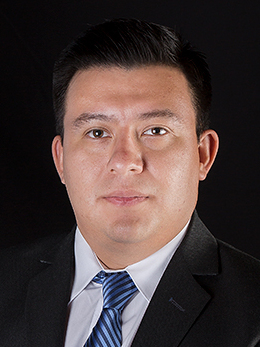
- Maldonado in 2019

Member of the Congress of the Republic
- Incumbent
- Assumed office 14 January 2024
- In office 14 January 2016 – 14 January 2020

Personal details
- Born: 5 July 1990 (age 35)

Ervin Adim Maldonado Molina (born 5 July 1990) is a Guatemalan politician. He has been a member of the Congress of the Republic since 2024, having previously served from 2016 to 2020. He is the son of former congressman Eri Adim Maldonado de León.
