= Samuel Pérez Álvarez =

Guatemalan economist and politician

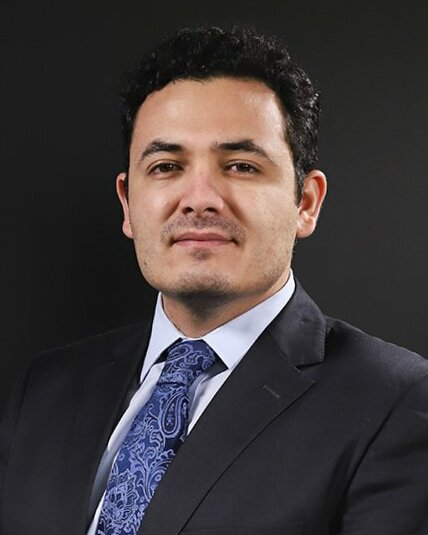
- Official portrait, 2020

President of the Congress of Guatemala
- In office 14 January 2024 – 19 January 2024
- Preceded by: Shirley Rivera
- Succeeded by: Nery Ramos

Member of the Congress of Guatemala
- Incumbent
- Assumed office 14 January 2020
- Constituency: Guatemala City

Personal details
- Born: 27 August 1992 (age 34) Guatemala City
- Party: Roots
- Other political affiliations: Semilla
- Parent(s): Samuel Pérez-Attías, Claudia Alvarez-Lutin
- Education: Rafael Landívar University

Samuel Andrés Pérez Álvarez (born 27 August 1992) is a Guatemalan economist and politician who served as the president of the Congress of Guatemala for five days in January 2024. A member of the political party Semilla, he has been a member of Congress since January 2020.

== Personal life ==
The International Commission against Impunity in Guatemala presented a case of espionage and illegal wiretapping in 2019, allegedly requested by the then Minister of Economy, Acisclo Valladares Urruela, against members of the Semilla, including Lucrecia Hernández Mack, Patricia Orantes and Pérez. The process was archived in 2023.

Pérez was re-elected to Congress in 2023. A nine-hour delay of the inauguration of president-elect Bernardo Arévalo and Vice-president-elect Karin Herrera caused by a delay of the inauguration of incoming deputies, due to a judicial order earlier in the day by the Constitutional Court stripping Semilla of party status. Led by Pérez, the Semilla deputies negotiated a deal to be recognized as a bloc in Congress and elect Semilla deputies to congressional leadership, including the board of directors and the Debate Board. The deal secured a majority of 92 votes against a rival bid by Shirley Rivera, and Pérez was elected president of the Board. The board members were elected and sworn in minutes before midnight, which then allowed for Congress to proceed with the inauguration of Arévalo and Herrera minutes after the constitutional deadline of midnight, which was officiated by Pérez as president of Congress. Pérez is the youngest person to take office as President of Congress.
