= Movimiento Semilla =

Seed Movement Movimiento Semilla
- Secretary-General: Abelardo Pinto (acting)
- Leader in the Congress: José Carlos Sanabria
- Founded: 14 July 2017
- Legalised: 21 November 2018
- Dissolved: 12 July 2023 (de facto); 27 March 2026 (de jure)
- Succeeded by: Roots (partially)
- Headquarters: Guatemala City
- Youth wing: Juventud Semilla
- Membership (2023): 26,154
- Ideology: Social democracy; Social liberalism; Progressivism; Anti-corruption
- Political position: Arévalo's faction Centre; Roots faction Centre-left
- International affiliation: Progressive Alliance; Progressive International
- Colors: Green; Purple; Turquoise (customary)
- Seats in Congress: 23 / 160

Website
- movimientosemilla.gt

Movimiento Semilla ([seˈmi.ʝa], lit. 'Seed Movement') was a centre-left, progressive, social-democratic political party in Guatemala. On 14 January 2024, it became Guatemala's governing party following the inauguration of President Bernardo Arévalo. The status of the party was uncertain from 2023 to 2025, being cancelled in 2026.

Semilla was originated as an analysis group following the 2015 protests, later evolving into a political project and being formally registered as a party in 2018. Its agenda was based on a reformist and anti-corruption platform. In its first electoral participation in 2019 general election, the presidential candidacy of former Attorney General Thelma Aldana was disqualified, preventing her from running. Nevertheless, the group secured seven seats in the Congress, where it acted as an opposition force during the Alejandro Giammattei administration, a period in which it consolidated its parliamentary presence.

In the 2023 general elections, the party achieved significant national prominence when its presidential candidate, Bernardo Arévalo, advanced to the runoff and the movement secured 23 seats in Congress. Although the presidential ticket won the election, the organization faced multiple judicial proceedings led by the Public Ministry, which challenged the legality of its formation and jeopardized the democratic transition.

In practice, these judicial actions left the party in a state of legal vulnerability that weakened its capacity to govern. Despite efforts to restore its status, the party never regained its legal standing and was officially canceled in 2026. Although it has not functioned as a political party since 2023, Semilla still operates as a political movement and maintains some influence.

Prior to this, in 2025, the parliamentary group underwent an internal split due to strategic differences: while deputies aligned with the government sought to exhaust all legal avenues to recover the party's status, the faction led by Samuel Pérez Álvarez opted to distance itself to pursue the creation of a new political project. In 2026, the Semilla group is seeking an electoral alliance with the Guatemalan National Revolutionary Unity party.

== History ==
The Semilla Movement was registered before the Supreme Electoral Tribunal on 14 July 2017. Its founding members include Edelberto Torres Rivas, Samuel Pérez Álvarez, Bernardo Arévalo, Lucrecia Hernández Mack, Jonathan Menkos, Irma Alicia Velásquez Nimatuj, Anabella Giracca, Patricia Orantes and Juan Alberto Fuentes. Its Secretary-General is Abelardo Pinto. The party began after the demonstrations that led to the resignation of President Otto Pérez Molina. The party defines itself as a political, democratic and plural movement. It has more than 22,000 members. The Semilla Movement party had rapprochement with former Attorney General Thelma Aldana to explore a possible presidential candidacy and a coalition with Encuentro por Guatemala and Libre. After investigations by Attorney General María Consuelo Porras and the UN anti-corruption commissioner Iván Velásquez Gómez requesting the removal of parliamentary immunity from Nineth Montenegro, secretary general of Encuentro por Guatemala, for possible anonymous electoral financing, the coalition negotiations effectively stopped. On 21 November 2018, the political organization concluded meeting necessary requirements and was made official as a political party on the same day.

Semilla brings together various political groups in Guatemala. In the 2023 Guatemalan presidential election, the party unexpectedly advanced to the second round, and won 23 seats in the Congressional election.

On 12 July 2023, the Public Ministry announced, at the request of a court, the suspension of the party due to an allegation made in May 2022 about the party falsifying signatures to qualify themselves for the 2023 general election.

On 13 July, the Constitutional Court, the highest court for constitutional law in Guatemala, granted an injunction against the suspension.

In August, judge Fredy Orellana issued a ruling to reinstate the suspension. The Registry of Citizens of the Supreme Electoral Tribunal provisionally cancelled the party's registration on 28 August. Semilla filed an appeal, saying the ruling was an attempt to prevent the party's parliamentarians and president-elect from taking office.

On 30 August 2023, President of Congress Shirley Rivera dissolved the parliamentary group of Movimiento Semilla and declared them "independent". President-elect and member of Congress Bernardo Arévalo was also affected by the decision.

On 3 September, the Supreme Electoral Tribunal overturned the suspension of the party's registration through October. Members of the public in seven of the 22 departments also held protests against the Attorney General's office, accusing it of attempting to interfere in the electoral process. On 5 October, the Constitutional Court upheld the party's suspension, with protests following. The Organization of American States stated that the elections were peaceful and transparent, and that actions of prosecutors appeared to be politically motivated and aimed at preventing Bernardo Arévalo from taking office as president.

Following the expiry of the Supreme Electoral Tribunal order, the party was suspended again on 2 November. On 16 November, prosecutors said they would ask the Supreme Court to strip Arévalo, Vice President-elect Karin Herrera, and other members of Semilla of immunity from prosecution for damages resulting from a 2022 protest at a public university over the election of a new rector, claiming Arévalo made posts on Twitter encouraging students to take over the university. The United States described the moves as "brazen efforts to undermine Guatemala's peaceful transition of power," and imposed visa restrictions on eleven people for "undermining democracy and the rule of law".

== Ideology ==
The party defines itself as a democratic and pluralistic political movement. It states that its political identity is environmentalist and progressivist. The political party has 5 ideological principles:

1. Construction of democracy
2. Equity as the guiding axis of public policy
3. The recognition of a pluralistic country
4. Boost a humane economy
5. Respect for nature

=== International policy ===
Semilla has condemned the governments of Nicaragua and Venezuela, classifying them as dictatorships. It proposed and voted in favor of a motion to not recognize the results of the 2021 Nicaraguan general election.

In March 2022, Semilla officials and other opposition parties were proponents of a legislative proposal to urge president Alejandro Giammattei to take measures against the Russian government for its invasion of Ukraine. The proposal included requested the cancellation of the Sputnik V vaccine acquisition contract with the Russian government.

In October 2023, the party was accepted in the Progressive International. It is also a member of the Progressive Alliance, a group of progressive and social democratic parties created in 2013 from a split in the Socialist International.

== Controversies ==
In 2020, the wife of Fuentes Knight, Ana Cristina Castañeda, complained of the limited support that the party gave her husband after the case he was involved in, and expressed disagreement with the leadership of the party. In February 2021, founder Suzanne Brichaux and pre-candidate for deputy for Sacatepéquez in 2019 was expelled from the party on grounds that she had committed usurpation of functions and violations of internal regulations. Brichaux argued that it was all due to "questioning the leadership."

In December 2021, the party disowned deputy José Alberto Sánchez Guzmán for having violated party discipline by having voted in favor of the concession for the construction and operation of the Escuintla-Puerto Quetzal Highway. Sánchez Guzmán later joined the right-wing Republican Union party. In 2022, deputy Luis Fernando Pineda Lemus left Semilla on good terms and joined the right-wing Visión con Valores party.

=== Complaints ===
In March 2023, the party filed a complaint with the Electoral Crimes Prosecutor's Office of the Public Ministry in the case of a forged signature when it was still a committee in formation. The complaint also included the people who allegedly collected the signature. Months later, the case was transferred from the Electoral Crimes Prosecutor's Office to the Special Prosecutor's Office Against Impunity, headed by prosecutor Rafael Curruchiche. Curruchiche is a prosecutor who had previously denounced the then candidate Edmond Mulet and requested the withdrawal of his immunity, for allegedly "obstructing justice" after speaking out against a trial against journalists, then denounced him for having carried out an "anticipatory campaign."

On 12 July 2023, the Supreme Electoral Court made the results official and confirmed that Torres and Arévalo would compete in the second round, however, at the same time, prosecutor Rafael Curruchiche of the Public Ministry announced that, at the request of the Special Prosecutor's Office Against Impunity, Judge Fredy Orellana suspended the legal personality of the Semilla Movement due to an alleged case of false signatures of members for the formation of the political party and ordered the electoral court to cancel the political party. According to Curruchiche, around 5,000 signatures were forged and, according to his opinion, there may be a crime of money laundering. According to Prensa Libre, there is another complaint against the party for allegedly falsifying the signatures in the membership books. Both the Supreme Electoral Court and legal experts stated that the judge did not act in accordance with the Electoral and Political Parties Law and that his This measure jeopardized the development of the second electoral round. The Registry of Citizens of the Supreme Electoral Tribunal requested an appeal to the Supreme Court of Justice to suspend the judge's order. Given this, the Semilla Movement presented a motion before the Constitutional Court to reverse the judge's order. Arévalo said that the actions of Curruchiche and Orellana were a "technical coup d'état."

The Court granted the motion provisionally and Semilla remained in the second round. Demonstrations were also called to request the resignation of Attorney General María Consuelo Porras, Prosecutor Curruchiche and Judge Orellana. Subsequently, Arévalo and his vice presidential candidate, Karin Herrera, were present at the demonstration and filed a criminal complaint against prosecutor Curruchiche and Judge Orellana. On 14 July, Arévalo, Herrera and their work team officially began the electoral campaign.

Given the chaos caused by the judicialization of the elections, various national and international actors denied the allegation of electoral fraud and stated that the results coincided with their observations. They also asked all parties to respect the electoral results. In addition, they strongly criticized the actions. of the Public Ministry. In a bipartisan statement, the United States Congress asked President Joe Biden to impose sanctions against those responsible for "threatening democracy" in Guatemala and particularly expressed their concern about the actions against Arévalo's candidacy. Around twenty former conservative presidents of Spain and Latin America issued a joint statement in which they condemned the attempt to disqualify Arévalo and his political party, and compared it to the recent disqualification of the Venezuelan opposition leader María Corina Machado. Argentine journalist Andrés Oppenheimer described the accusations of electoral fraud in Guatemala as an attempted "coup d'état", and compared them to Donald Trump's attempts to annul the results of the elections. United States presidential election of 2020. The Public Prosecutor's Office defended itself by stating that they have no intention of "interfering" or "disabling" the participation of the candidates and that their actions comply with the law.

On 17 July, Semilla's legal team recused Judge Orellana, which, according to the law, halted the judicial process until a new judge was selected for the case. A day later, Orellana requested an investigation against the head of the Citizen Registry of the Supreme Electoral Tribunal for not abiding by his judicial resolution, despite the fact that the Constitutional Court ruled in favor of Semilla and requested that the judge be notified. At the time, the Registrar was out of the country on vacation. In addition, the judge issued an arrest warrant against two former militants of the party. Hours later, the Special Prosecutor's Office Against Impunity ordered the Citizens Registry to report whether it had complied with Judge Orellana's order. Although the Public Ministry had previously stated that its intention was not to interfere in the elections or disqualify any candidate, in the circular sent to the Citizen Registry dated July 18, it was specified that the consequences of canceling the legal personality of the party included the prohibition to participate in any subsequent political act, as well as the inability to assign positions to party candidates. That same day, the Supreme Electoral Court reiterated to the Public Ministry and the judge that it will not suspend the party, citing its basis in the protection extended by the Constitutional Court.

== Internal crisis (2025–2026) ==
After several unsuccessful efforts to restore Semilla's legal standing, in May 2025, a faction led by deputy Samuel Pérez Álvarez announced the formation of a new political party. This move triggered a split within the Semilla bloc: only 14 of its 23 deputies supported the new initiative, while the remaining nine —closer to President Arévalo and Minister of Social Development Abelardo Pinto—, led by deputy José Carlos Sanabria opted not to join and publicly criticized the project.

The rift between Semilla and Raíces widened in 2026, marked by a public exchange of criticism between President Bernardo Arévalo and Raíces leader Samuel Pérez regarding Arévalo's perceived "passivity".

Rather than seeking reconciliation with its former allies, Semilla faction explored alliances with the Guatemalan National Revolutionary Unity (URNG) and the emerging party Somos Dignidad. The split also resonated among founding members: former Environment Minister Patricia Orantes joined the Raíces faction after resigning from her cabinet post to resume her seat in Congress. Conversely, Minister of Education Anabella Giracca has expressed sympathy for Raíces without formally joining, an attitude largely attributed to her personal loyalty to Arévalo.

== Electoral history ==
=== Presidential elections ===
Election	Candidates		First round		Second round		Status
Election	President	Vice President	Votes	%	Votes	%	Status
2019	Thelma Aldana	Jonathan Menkos	Disqualified				
2023	Bernardo Arévalo	Karin Herrera	654,534	15.58	2,442,718	60.91	Won ✓

=== Legislative elections ===
Election	Votes	%	Seats	+/–	Status
2019	211,691	5.26 (#4)	7 / 160	New	Opposition
2023	488,692	11.72 (#3)	23 / 160	▲16	Government
