= Prensa Libre (Guatemala) =

Guatemalan newspaper

- Front page of the first ever edition of Prensa Libre, from August 20, 1951. 3500 copies were issued that day.
- Type: Daily newspaper
- Format: Tabloid
- Owner(s): Prensa Libre, S.A.
- Editor: Gonzalo Marroquín Godoy (Director Editorial)
- Founded: 1951
- Language: Spanish
- Headquarters: 13 calle 9-31 zona 1 Guatemala City 01001
- Website: prensalibre.com

Prensa Libre is a Guatemalan newspaper published in Guatemala City by Prensa Libre, S.A. and distributed nationwide. It was formerly the most widely circulated newspaper in the country and as of 2007 it has the second-widest circulation. It is considered a newspaper of record. It was founded in 1951.

The billionaire Mario López Estrada was a minority stakeholder.

In March 2015, the newspaper's correspondent Danilo Lópéz was killed in an attack during a public event. In the aftermath of the death of Julio René Alvarado, the Prensa Libre publicly mocked Belizean officials who called on Guatemala for an apology. In October 2018, based on the information of an article published by the Prensa Libre, Donald Trump falsely claimed that ISIS members were hiding within the Central American migrant caravans.

== See also ==
- List of newspapers in Guatemala
