= 2027 Guatemalan general election =

- June and August 2027 (presumptive)
Incumbent President
Bernardo Arévalo
Independent (Note: Arévalo was elected by Movimiento Semilla, but the party was dissolved de facto in 2023 and de jure in 2026.)
- Legislative election
- All 160 seats in Congress; 81 seats needed for a majority
Party	Leader	Current seats
Vamos	Allan Rodríguez	39
UNE	José Inés Castillo	28
Semilla	Carlos Sanabria	23
Cabal	Luis Aguirre	18
VIVA	Edín de Jesús	11
Valor	Elmer Palencia	10
Todos	Felipe Alejos	6
VOS	Orlando Blanco	4
BIEN	Fidel Reyes Lee	4
PPN	Nadia de León Torres	3
Victoria	Juan Carlos Rivera	3
CREO	Cristian Álvarez	3
Blue	Jorge Villagrán	2
Elephant	Rodrigo Pellecer	2
Unionist	Álvaro Arzú Escobar	2
Winaq	Sonia Gutiérrez	1
Change	Esduin Javier Javier	1
Incumbent President of the Congress
Luis Contreras; CREO

General elections will be held in Guatemala in June 2027 to elect the president and vice president, all 160 seats in Congress, all 20 Guatemalan members of the Central American Parliament, and mayors and councils for all the country's 340 municipalities, with a second round of the presidential elections to be held in August if no candidate wins a majority in the first round. Incumbent President Bernardo Arévalo is constitutionally prohibited from running for a second four-year term.

It is expected that the ruling party's legislative coalition will seek to reform the Electoral Law.

== Electoral system ==
=== President ===
The President of Guatemala is elected using the two-round system.

=== Congress ===
The 160 members of Congress are elected by two methods; 130 are elected from 22 multi-member constituencies based on the departments, with the remaining 31 elected from a single nationwide constituency. Seats are elected using closed list proportional representation, with seats allocated using the D'Hondt method.

District	Seats
Alta Verapaz	9
Baja Verapaz	2
Chimaltenango	5
Chiquimula	3
El Progreso	2
Escuintla	6
Guatemala	19
Guatemala City	11
Huehuetenango	10
Izabal	3
Jalapa	3
Jutiapa	4
National List	32
Petén	4
Quetzaltenango	7
Quiché	8
Retalhuleu	3
Sacatepéquez	3
San Marcos	9
Santa Rosa	3
Sololá	3
Suchitepéquez	5
Totonicapán	4
Zacapa	2
Total	160

== Presidential candidates ==
=== Expressed interest ===
- Fausto Arimany, businessman and economist; (Valor)
- Roberto Arzú, businessman; (Independent)
- Sandra Jovel, current member of Congress; (Nuevos Tiempos)
- Napoleón Barrientos, former minister of the Interior; (Nosotros)
- Neto Bran, current mayor of Mixco; (Commitment, Renewal and Order)
- Armando Castillo, former member of Congress; (Vision with Values)
- Isaac Farchi, former member of Congress; (Change)
- Sergio Madrazo, lawyer; (Todos)
- Hugo Peña, political advisor; (Elephant Community)
- Carlos Pineda, businessman and internet personality; (Serve)
- Nery Ramos, former president of Congress; (Firmes)
  - Running mate: Evelyn Morataya, current member of Congress
- Giovanni Reyes, economist; (Blue Party)
- Sandra Torres, former First Lady of Guatemala; (National Unity of Hope)

=== Potential candidates ===
- Anabella Giracca, current minister of Education; (Roots)
- Patricia Orantes, current minister of Environment; (Roots)
- Abelardo Pinto, current minister of Social Development (potentially Guatemalan National Revolutionary Unity)
- Carlos Ruiz, former professional footballer
- Martín Toc, former president of 48 cantones de Totonicapán

=== Declined candidatures ===
- Erick Cano, former military (Victory);
- Hugo Sarceño, current mayor of Puerto Barrios; (Bienestar Nacional)

== Congress ==
Party	Current legislative leader		2023 result	
Party	Image	Name	Votes (%)	Seats
Vamos		Allan Rodríguez	15.06%	39 / 160
National Unity of Hope		José Inés Castillo	12.90%	28 / 160
Movimiento Semilla		José Carlos Sanabria	11.72%	23 / 160
Cabal		Luis Aguirre	8.90%	18 / 160
Vision with Values		Edín de Jesús	6.92%	11 / 160
Valor		Elmer Palencia	5.51%	10 / 160
Unionist Party		Álvaro Arzú Escobar	5.51%	2 / 160
Todos		Felipe Alejos	4.05%	6 / 160
Will, Opportunity and Solidarity		Orlando Blanco	4.47%	4 / 160
Bienestar Nacional		Fidel Reyes Lee	2.70%	4 / 160
Nosotros		Nadia de León Torres	3.15%	3 / 160
Victory		Juan Carlos Rivera	3.00%	3 / 160
Commitment, Renewal and Order		Cristian Álvarez	2.03%	3 / 160
Blue Party		Jorge Mario Villagrán	2.36%	2 / 160
Elephant Community		Rodrigo Pellecer	2.29%	2 / 160
Winaq		Sonia Gutiérrez	3.21%	1 / 160
Guatemalan National Revolutionary Unity		TBA	3.21%	1 / 160
Change		Esduin Javier	1.26%	1 / 160

== Opinion polls ==
=== Opinion polls before candidate registration ===
- Political parties that are crossed out are not active or have been cancelled; and political parties in italics refer to those that are in formation.
- * Tentative candidate; unconfirmed

Polling firm	Fieldwork date	Sample size	Roberto Arzú	Neto Bran	Armando Castillo	Anabella Giracca*	Edmond Mulet	Hugo Peña	Carlos Pineda	Nery Ramos	Zury Ríos	Sandra Torres	Others	No one
Polling firm	Fieldwork date	Sample size	FG	CREO	VIVA	Roots	XGuate	CE	Serve	Firmes	Unionist	UNE	Others	No one
Estudio Electoral	13–17 October 2026	3,000	15.7%	8.4%	2.7%	4.2%	1.1%	0.5%	7.3%	4.7%	6.4%	11.7%	9.2% (Note: 1.4%: Lionel Toriello (VOS) 1.3%: Sandra Jovel (New Times) 1.2%: Fausto Arimany (Valor) 1.0%: Sergio Madrazo (Todos) 0.9%: Isaac Farchi (Change) 0.9%: Sonia Gutiérrez (Winaq) 0.8%: Óscar Cruz (Jaguar) 0.6%: Abelardo Pinto (Semilla) 0.6%: Giovanni Reyes (Blue Party) 0.5%: Napoleón Barrientos (PPN))	28.6%
30 Sep	Roberto Arzú resigns from Cabal and joins Fuerza por Guatemala.													
Estudio Electoral	31 August–4 September 2026	3,000	18.5%	7.8%	2.6%	3.2%	0.1%	1.4%	8.6%	5.3%	1.9%	13.4%	3.9% (Note: 1.3%: Sonia Gutiérrez (Winaq) 0.9%: Sergio Madrazo (Todos) 0.9%: Fausto Arimany (Valor) 0.9%: Abraham Rivera (Victory) 0.6%: Óscar Cruz (Jaguar) 0.2%: Hugo Sarceño (BIEN))	32.6%
Datos Duros	August 2026	785	19.0%	8.0%	—N/a	—N/a	—N/a	—N/a	10.0%	3.0%	2.0%	11.0%	8.0%	39.0%
Estudio Electoral	27 July–1 August 2026	3,000	15.8%	5.9%	3.4%	4.0%	2.0%	2.7%	7.0%	5.1%	3.2%	11.6%	3.5% (Note: 2.1%: Sergio Madrazo (Todos) 1.4%: Fausto Arimany (Valor))	31.3%
Datos Duros	18–23 July 2026	780	18.0%	7.5%	—N/a	—N/a	—N/a	—N/a	9.0%	2.5%	2.0%	14.0%	7.0%	40.0%
Estudio Electoral	27 June–2 July 2026	3,000	14.3%	9.3%	3.0%	2.1%	1.0%	1.2%	7.4%	1.6%	5.3%	12.0%	3.9% (Note: 2.1%: Fausto Arimany (Valor) 1.3%: Sandra Jovel (Force) 0.3%: Óscar Castañeda (PODER) 0.1%: Óscar Cruz (Jaguar) 0.1%: Manuel Conde Orellana (Vamos))	38.9%
Estudio Electoral	26–30 May 2026	3,000	16.7%	4.7%	2.1%	0.3%	1.8%	2.1%	11.4%	3.3%	6.1%	15.5%	1.8% (Note: 1.0%: Manuel Conde Orellana (Vamos) 0.8%: Óscar Castañeda (PODER))	34.2%
CID-Gallup	c. May 2026	1,200	13.0%	—N/a	—N/a	—N/a	—N/a	—N/a	23.0%	—N/a	—N/a	27.0%	7.0% (Note: 7.0%: Thelma Aldana (Ind.))	30.0%
