= Serve (political party) =

Serve Servir
- Leader: Carlos Pineda
- Founded: 5 November 2023
- Split from: Cambio, Citizen Prosperity
- Ideology: Conservatism; Right-wing populism
- Political position: Right-wing
- Colors: Sky blue
- Seats in Congress: 0 / 160

Website
- https://partidopoliticoservir.com.gt/es/

Serve (Spanish: Servir) is a political party in formation in Guatemala, led by businessman and influencer Carlos Pineda.

== History ==
Carlos Pineda ran as a presidential candidate in 2023 general election for two different political parties: Cambio and then Citizen Prosperity, formalizing his candidacy with the latter. Pineda was ultimately declared the favorite to run in the runoff by several polls, but was controversially disqualified due to several legal proceedings allegedly committed by his party.

After Bernardo Arévalo's electoral victory, Pineda announced the formation of a new political project, holding its first meeting in November 2023, which became official in April 2024, when Serve's first general assembly was held. Several former candidates who had run alongside Pineda in 2023 attended, including his unsuccessful 2023 running mate, fellow influencer Efraín Orozco.

By 2025, the party had met most of the requirements for its participation in 2027 general election, but is pending legal registration with the Supreme Electoral Tribunal. The party and its ideology revolve around the leadership of Pineda, who has declared himself a conservative. Pineda has been critical of President Bernardo Arévalo's administration and has surrounded himself with figures opposed to his government.
