= Force for Guatemala =

- Leader: Mauricio Radford: Alejandro Giammattei (2015); Roberto Arzú (2026–present)
- Founder: Mauricio Radford
- Founded: 2011 (as Force); August 2025 (as Force for Guatemala)
- Dissolved: 27 February 2020 (as Force)
- Ideology: Populism; Nationalism
- Political position: Centre-right to right-wing
- Seats in Congress: 0 / 160

Website
- www.fuerza.org.gt

Force for Guatemala (Spanish: Fuerza por Guatemala, FG) is a political party in Guatemala. The party was founded as Force (Spanish: Fuerza) in 2011 and existed until its dissolution in 2020; it was subsequently refounded in 2025 as Force for Guatemala, with Mauricio Radford serving as its founder and leader on both occasions.

== History ==
Logo of Fuerza (2011–2020)

The party was established in 2011 by Mauricio Radford. Prior to the 2015 elections it nominated Alejandro Giammattei as its presidential candidate; Giammattei finished fourth in a field of fourteen candidates with 6% of the vote. In the Congressional elections the party received 2% of the vote, winning two of the 158 seats; Raul Romero Segura in Guatemala City and Claude Harmelin de Leon in Guatemala Department.

Following the 2015 elections, Giammattei left the party and founded Vamos por una Guatemala Diferente. For the 2019 elections, the party decided to nominate Mauricio Radford and Abundio Maldonado as its candidates for president and vice president, respectively; however, the Supreme Electoral Tribunal rejected Radford's registration, as he was then facing an ongoing legal case involving allegations of corruption. Lacking a presidential candidate, the party performed poorly and lost all of its electoral representation. Because it failed to meet the legal requirements necessary to ensure its survival, the party was dissolved in 2020.

In 2024, Radford initiated the process to found a new political party, finally Force for Guatemala was registered by the Supreme Electoral Tribunal in August 2025 with the intention of participating in the 2027 general elections. Several options for a presidential candidate were considered, including congresswoman and former Foreign Minister Sandra Jovel, as well as Radford himself. In October 2026, Roberto Arzú announced that he would be the party's presidential candidate, following his departure from the Cabal.

== Election results ==
=== President ===
Election	Candidates		First round		Second round		Status
Election	President	Vice President	Votes	%	Votes	%	Status
Force (2011–2020)
2015	Alejandro Giammattei	Fernando Paiz	313,628	6.53	—N/a	—N/a	Lost ✗
2019	Mauricio Radford	Abundio Maldonado	Disqualified				
Force for Guatemala (2025–present)
2027	TBA	TBA	TBD	TBD	TBD	TBD	TBD

=== Congress ===
Election	Votes	%	Seats	+/–	Status
Force (2011–2020)
2015	95,392	2.09 (#13)	2 / 160	New	External support
2019	77,862	1.93 (#19)	0 / 160	▼2	Extra-parliamentary
Force for Guatemala (2025–present)
2027
