= Armando Castillo (politician) =

Guatemalan businessman and politician

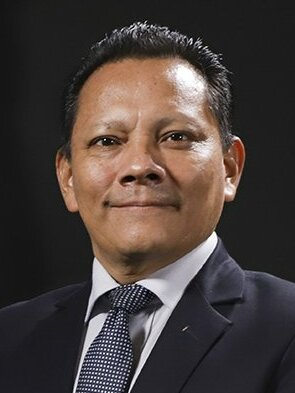
- Official portrait, 2020

Member of the Congress of Guatemala
- In office 14 January 2020 – 14 January 2024

Personal details
- Born: 27 September 1965 (age 61) Nebaj, Quiché, Guatemala
- Party: VIVA
- Occupation: Politician; businessman

Armando Damián Castillo Alvarado (born 27 September 1965) is a Guatemalan businessman and politician who has served as a deputy of the Guatemalan Congress for the National List from 2020 to 2024 for the Visión con Valores (VIVA) party, he is also Secretary General of the same political grouping since 2022.

== Biography ==
Castillo was born in Nebaj, Quiché department. He lived in that department until he turned 15, but had to migrate to Guatemala City due to the increase in violence in the context of the Guatemalan Civil War. He started a shoe manufacturing venture, which grew over time. Subsequently, he began to own real estate businesses.

== Political career ==
He ranked first in the list of candidates for deputies for the National List of the Vision with Values (VIVA) party in the 2019 legislative elections. He was elected as a deputy and took office on January 14, 2020 as part of the IX Legislature of Guatemala.

As a member of Congress, he was a member of several parliamentary commissions such as Labor, Food Security, Health and Social Assistance, Environment, Ecology and Natural Resources, and Agriculture, Livestock and Fisheries.

In 2020, the legislative block of the Vision with Values party supported the government of Alejandro Giammattei and for this reason, the party integrated the Board of Directors of the Congress of the Republic in two periods: 2020-2021 and 2021-2022. In those two terms, Castillo was elected as the third vice president of Congress during the presidency of Allan Rodríguez.

In February 2022, Castillo became General Secretary of Vision with Values. In that same year, he supported and voted in favor of the controversial decree 18-2022, officially known as the "Law for the Protection of Life and Family" which criminalized abortion and would have blocked sexual education and rejected gender diversity. However, the law was vetoed by President Alejandro Giammattei.

In mid-2023, it became known that Castillo, in his capacity as the party's general secretary, made an alliance with former Guatemalan president Alfonso Portillo for the 2023 Guatemalan general election. On February 11, 2023, Castillo was proclaimed as the presidential candidate of Visión con Valores (VIVA) along with businessman Édgar Grisolia as the vice-presidential candidate. He was officially registered before the Supreme Electoral Tribunal on March 10, 2023. Castillo placed fourth place in the first round receiving 9.44% of the vote.
