= List of presidents of the Congress of the Republic of Guatemala =

Highest representative of the Legislative Body

President of the Congress of the Republic
- Coat of arms of Guatemala

- Presidential standard of President of Congress

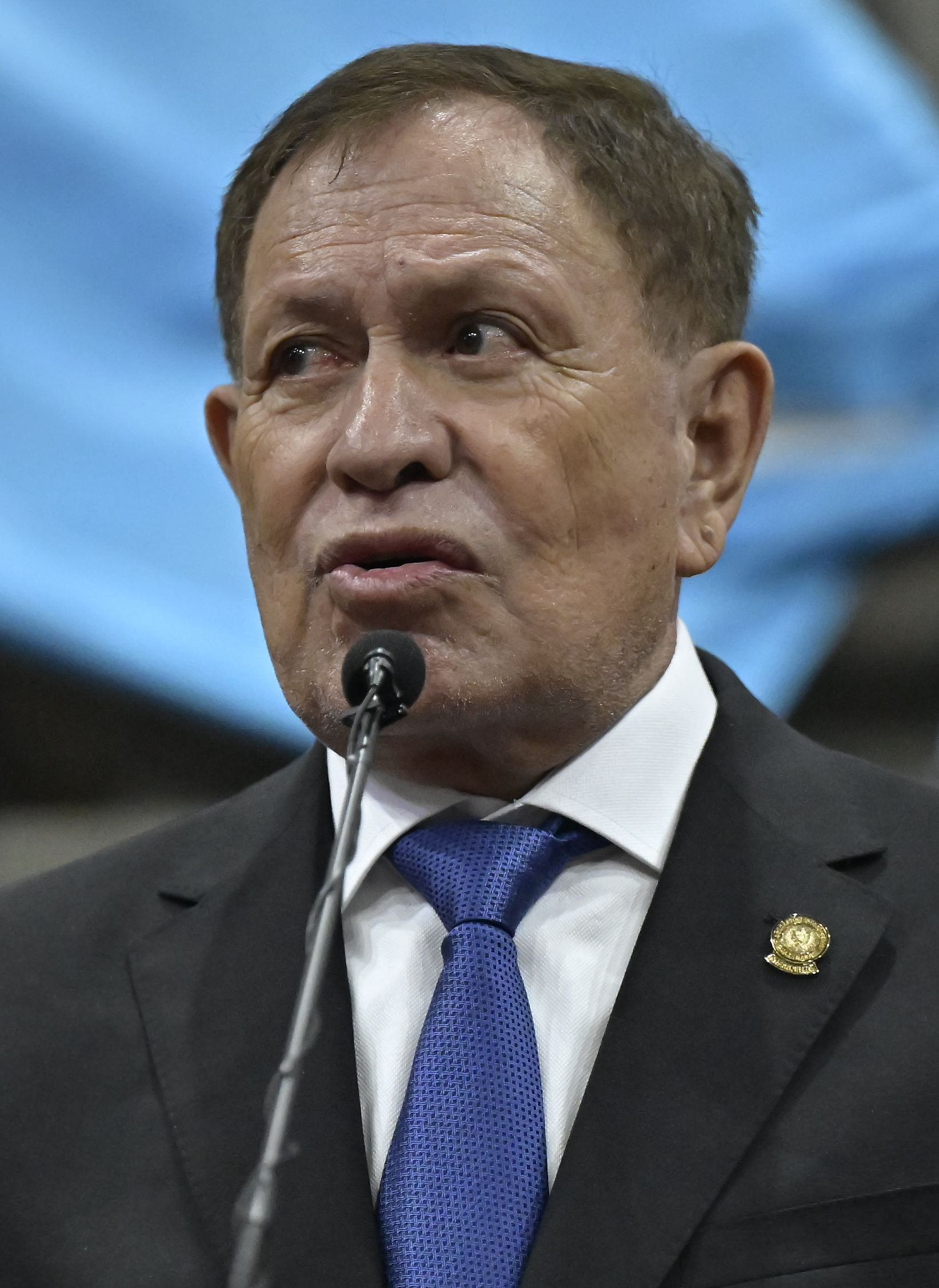
- Incumbent; Luis Alberto Contreras Colindres since January 14, 2026
- Style: Mr. President
- Seat: Guatemala City
- Appointer: Congress of Guatemala
- Term length: 1 year
- Inaugural holder: Jorge García Granados
- Formation: March 15, 1945
- Deputy: First Vice President

The President of the Congress of the Republic of Guatemala (Spanish: Presidente del Congreso de la República de Guatemala) is the presiding officer of the legislature. Until 1996 the title was President of the National Congress.

Below is a partial list of office-holders:

== Chamber of Representatives 1851–1879 ==
Cámara de Representantes

Name	Took office	Left office	Notes
Manuel Francisco Pavón Aycinena	1827	1827	
Fernando Antonio Dávila	July 1839	December 1839 – ?	Constituent assembly
Miguel Larreynaga	? – September 1840	September 1840 – ?	
Pedro Molina	1848	1848	Constituent assembly
Juan Matheu	? – Jan 1849	January 1852 – ?	
José Antonio Azmitia	? – 1858	1858 – ?	
Juan Matheu	? – January 1868	1872 – ?	
Marcos Dardón	? – August 1872	August 1872 – ?	

== National Assembly 1879–1945 ==
Presidente de la Asamblea Legislativa or Presidente de la Asamblea Nacional.

Name	Took office	Left office	Notes
José Antonio Salazar	7 May 1873	13 September 1876	Constituent assembly
Manuel J. Dardon	1 October 1876	26 October 1876	Constituent assembly
José Farfán	? – March 1879	December 1879 – ?	Constituent assembly
José Antonio Salazar	1 March 1880	1 March 1881	
Francisco Lainfiesta	1 March 1881	1 March 1882	
José Antonio Salazar	1 March 1882	11 November 1882	died
Francisco Lainfiesta	2 December 1882	30 November 1883	His period ended on 1884
Angel María Arroyo	30 November 1883	1 March 1884	During extraordinary sessions
Manuel Ramírez	1 March 1884	1 March 1885	
Angel María Arroyo	1 March 1885	5 April 1885	Appointed as Secretary of Interior
José Salazar	6 April 1885	26 May 1885	The Assembly was dissolved to reform the constitution
Joaquín Macal	24 August 1885	22 October 1885	Constituent assembly to reform the Constitution
Miguel Alvarez	1 March 1886	1 March 1887	
Manuel Ramírez	1 March 1887	26 June 1887	
Ramón Uriarte	1 October 1887	16 November 1887	Constituent assembly to reform the Constitution
Arturo Ubico Urruela	1 March 1888	12 March 1888	
José Pinto	12 April 1888	1 March 1891	
Antonio Lazo Arriaga	1 March 1891	April 1891	
Miguel Flores Mata	April 1891	1 March 1892	
José Pinto	1 March 1892	1 March 1894	
Mariano Cruz	1 March 1894	1 March 1895	
Arturo Ubico Urruela	1 March 1895	1 March 1896	
Mariano Cruz	1 March 1896	1 March 1897	
Feliciano Aguilar	1 March 1897	31 May 1897	Reina Barrios dissolved the Assembly
Mariano Cruz	16 August 1897	30 August 1897	Constituent assembly to reform the Constitution
Arturo Ubico Urruela	1 March 1898	3 June 1903	
José Pinto	4 July 1903	12 July 1903	Constituent assembly to reform the Constitution
Arturo Ubico Urruela	1 March 1904	October 1919	
Mariano Cruz	? – September 1919	September 1919 – ?	
Adrián Vidaurre	1 March 1920	April 1920 – ?	
José Antonio Mandujano	1920	1920	
Tácito Molina Izquierdo	? – November 1920	March 1921 – ?	
José Antonio Mandujano	1921	1922	
Heriberto Abraham Cabrera Rodríguez	1922	ca. 1923	
José A. Beteta	? – December 1927	December 1927 – ?	Constituent assembly
Juan José Ortega Carrascal	1930	February 1931	
Juan J. Ortega	March 1932	April 1934	
Luis F. Mendizábal	1935	1941	
Ramón Calderón	? – September 1941	September 1941 – ?	Constituent assembly
Manuel Galich	3 December 1944	15 March 1945	

== Congress since 1945 ==
The title 1984–1986 was President of the National Constituent Assembly

Name	Took office	Left office	Party	Notes
Jorge García Granados	10 January 1945	15 March 1945		National constituent assembly
Jorge García Granados	20 March 1945	12 July 1945		
Julio Bonilla González	20 July 1945	28 February 1946		
Gerardo Gordillo Barrios	19 March 1946	28 February 1947		
Mario Monteforte Toledo	1947	March 1948		
Víctor Manuel Giordani	1948	1948		
Óscar Barrios Castillo	1948	1948		
Mario Monteforte Toledo	1 March 1949	28 February 1950		
Guillermo Fonseca Penedo	1 March 1950	28 February 1951		
Roberto Alvarado Fuentes	1 March 1951	28 February 1952		
Julio Estrada de la Hoz	1 March 1952	28 February 1953		
Guillermo Ovando Arriola	1 March 1953	28 February 1954		
Marco Antonio Franco Chacón	1 March 1954	29 June 1954		Deposed
Luis Arturo González López	29 October 1954	28 February 1956		National constituent assembly
Luis Arturo González López	1 March 1956	28 February 1957		
Federico Carbonell Rodas	1 March 1957	28 February 1958		
Julio Prado García Salas	1 March 1958	28 February 1959		
Ernesto Viteri Bertrand	1 March 1959	28 February 1960		
Jorge Luis Zelaya Coronado	1 March 1960	28 February 1961		
Rubén Flores Avendaño	1 March 1961	28 February 1962		
Miguel Angel Ortega Mérida	1 March 1962	28 February 1963		
Manuel Orellana Portillo	1 March 1963	31 March 1963		
Vicente Diaz Samayoa	6 July 1964	5 May 1966		Constituent assembly president
Mario Fuentes Pieruccini	5 May 1966	15 June 1967		
José Gregorio Prem Beteta	15 June 1967	1968		
Manuel Francisco Villamar	1968	1969		
Enrique A. Claverie Delgado	1969	1970		
Mario Sandoval Alarcón	1970	June 1974		
Luis Alfonso López	June 1974	June 1975		
Donaldo Álvarez Ruiz	June 1975	1976		
Luis Alfonso López	1976	1977		
Rafael Castillo Valdez	1977	June 1978		
José Trinidad Uclés	1978	1979		
Manuel Salvador Polanco Ramírez	1979	1981		
Tomás Esteban Zepeda Guzmán	1981	1982		
Jorge Bonilla López	1982	March 1982		
Ramiro de León Carpio	July 1984	January 1986	UCN	Three rotating presidents
Roberto Carpio	July 1984	January 1986	DCG	Three rotating presidents
Héctor Aragón Quiñónez	July 1984	January 1986	MLN	Three rotating presidents
Alfonso Cabrera Hidalgo	January 1986	1986	DCG	
Roberto Adolfo Valle Valdizán	1986	1987	DCG	
José Ricardo Gómez Gálvez	1987	1988	DCG	
Alfonso Alonso Barillas	1988	1989	DCG	
José Fernando Lobo Dubón	1989	1990	DCG	
Marco Antonio Dardón Castillo	January 1990	January 1991	DCG	
Ana Catalina Soberanis Reyes	January 1991	January 1992	DCG	
Edmond Mulet	January 1992	January 1993	UCN	
José Fernando Lobo Dubón	January 1993	June 1993	DCG	
Óscar Vinicio Villar Anleu	January 1994	September 1994	DCG	
Arabella Castro Quiñónez de Comparini	September 1994	January 1995	PAN	
José Efraín Ríos Montt	January 1995	1996	FRG	
Carlos Alberto García Regás	1996	1997	PAN	
Arabella Castro Quiñónez de Comparini	1997	1998	PAN	
Rafael Eduardo Barrios Flores	1998	1999	PAN	
Leonel López Rodas	1999	January 2000	PAN	
José Efraín Ríos Montt	January 2000	January 2004	FRG	
Francisco Rolando Morales Chávez	January 2004	January 2005	UNE	
Jorge Méndez Herbruger	January 2005	January 2007	GANA	
Ruben Dario Morales Véliz	January 2007	January 2008	PAN	
Eduardo Meyer	January 2008	August 2008	UNE	
Arístides Crespo Villegas	August 2008	January 2008	FRG	
José Roberto Alejos Cámbara	January 2009	January 2012	UNE	
Gudy Rivera Estrada	January 2012	January 2013	PP	
Pedro Muadi	January 2013	January 2014	PP	
Arístides Crespo Villegas	January 2014	January 2015	PP	
Luis Rabbé	January 2015	January 2016	Independent	
Mario Taracena	January 2016	January 2017	UNE	
Óscar Chinchilla	January 2017	January 2018	CREO	
Álvaro Arzú Escobar	January 2018	January 2020	PU	
Allan Rodríguez	January 2020	January 2022	VAMOS	
Shirley Rivera	14 January 2022	14 January 2024	VAMOS	
Samuel Pérez Álvarez	14 January 2024	19 January 2024	Semilla	
Nery Ramos	19 January 2024	14 January 2026	Blue Party	
Luis Alberto Contreras Colindres	14 January 2026	Incumbent	CREO	
