= Lucrecia Marroquín =

Guatemalan politician

Member of the Congress of Guatemala
- Incumbent
- Assumed office 14 January 2020
- Constituency: Guatemala City; National List (since 2024)
- In office 14 January 2004 – 14 January 2008
- Constituency: Guatemala City

Personal details
- Born: 26 July 1951 (age 74) Guatemala City, Guatemala
- Party: Valor
- Other political affiliations: Guatemalan Republican Front; Unionist Party (since 2024)

Ana Lucrecia Marroquín Godoy (born 26 July 1951) is a Guatemalan politician and educator. She is member of the Congress of Guatemala since 2020 and from 2004 to 2008. She was Second Vice President of Congress from April 2021 to January 2022.
