= Carlos Pineda (politician) =

Guatemalan politician and businessperson

Carlos Pineda Sosa

Personal details
- Born: 29 May 1972 (age 54) Zacapa, Guatemala
- Party: Serve
- Other political affiliations: Avanza (2019); Cambio (2022–2023); Citizen Prosperity (2023)
- Spouse: María Guadalupe Hurtarte (m. 1996)
- Education: Colegio San José de los Infantes
- Occupation: Businessman

Carlos René Pineda Sosa (born 29 May 1972) is a Guatemalan politician and businessman who ran in the 2023 Guatemalan general election. He was considered a political dark horse and he made his first candidacy for the presidency under Citizen Prosperity party, where polls placed him as a favorite. He was eventually disqualified.

== Early life and career ==
Pineda was born in Zacapa to businessman Carlos René Pineda Rossell and Lilian Consuelo Sosa Orellana. His father joined the Guatemalan Army at age 17 during the Guatemalan Civil War, and rose to be part of the Presidential General Staff during the government of Carlos Arana Osorio. After returning from military service, he was a transporter for the United Fruit Company and later Chiquita.

Pineda spent part of his childhood in Santo Tomás de Castilla, attending primary school there, later moving to Guatemala City to pursue further education, eventually studying at the Colegio San José de los Infantes. Between 1989 and 1990, he worked in a jewelry store in the United States owned by a friend.

Pineda currently owns businesses in a few sectors, including agriculture (growing African palms, bananas and other fruits; cattle ranching), petroleum (gas stations), and transport.

During Hurricane Eta and Hurricane Iota in 2020, Pineda lent an aircraft he owned to help and evacuate people in Alta Verapaz Department and Izabal Department.

== Political career ==
Pineda's political career unofficially began in 2019, when he was mentioned as a possible running mate for the candidacy of Mario Estrada of the National Change Union in that year's presidential election. However, this ended up not materializing, and Pineda joined Avanza, where he was elected secretary general of the party's branch in Izabal Department.

After the 2019 elections and the dissolution of Avanza, Pineda joined and left several political parties that were in the process of forming. During this period, he began creating content on TikTok.

=== Lead-up to presidential candidacy ===
In 2022, Pineda joined Cambio, another political party in formation, which was linked to the children of former presidential candidate Manuel Baldizón (at the time still in prison in the United States for money laundering). Pineda began rising within the organizations ranks and was described as a potential presidential candidate for them, but resigned after Baldizón returned to Guatemala and began participating in Cambio's affairs. After leaving Cambio, Pineda engaged in talks with the Guatemalan People's Party and Bienestar Nacional before finally deciding to join Citizen Prosperity, where he was announced as the party's presidential candidate on 5 February 2023 for the 2023 election. His naming as the presidential candidate so quickly after he joined led to the resignation of the Secretary General of the party (and former Minister of the Economy), Antonio Malouf, who had previously been considered the party's likely presidential nominee. Pineda was officially registered as the party's presidential candidate on 7 March, with YouTuber Efraín Orozco (who had previously joined Cambio along with him) announced as the vice presidential candidate.

==== Campaign ====
Pineda experienced a sharp rise in opinion polls in mid-April 2023, finishing between first and third place in those conducted since then. The media has explained this is due to his outsider profile, ability to harness social media, and to communicate closely and colloquially with voters. Pineda's social media strategy was being managed by Cristian Aguilar, who had assisted fellow outsider candidate Jimmy Morales in 2015. Morales ended up winning the election for the presidency.

==== Disqualification ====
On 9 May 2023, the Cambio party filed an amparo with the Administrative Litigation Chamber against Citizen Prosperity, arguing that they had made several errors when holding their party assemblies required for the nomination of candidates. On 19 May, the Chamber accepted the amparo, suspending Pineda's presidential candidacy as well as the candidacy for 218 candidates for mayoral and legislative races. Pineda stated that he would appeal the decision to the Constitutional Court. On 26 May, the Constitutional Court rejected Pineda's appeal.

== Personal life ==
Pineda married María Guadalupe Hurtarte in July 1996, and has three children.
