= Elephant Community =

Elephant Community Comunidad Elefante
- Leader: Hugo Peña Medina
- Secretary-General: Hugo Peña Medina
- Founded: 2020
- Legalised: 1 August 2022
- Ideology: Developmentalism
- Political position: Right-wing
- Colors: Yellow
- Seats in Congress: 2 / 160

Elephant Community (Spanish: Comunidad Elefante) is a political party in Guatemala.

== History ==
Elephant Community was established in 2020, the leader and founder is Hugo Peña Medina, a political strategist and adviser who worked in the presidential campaigns of Vinicio Cerezo, Alfonso Portillo, Álvaro Arzú and Álvaro Colom and father of singer Carlos Peña. On 1 August 2022, the Supreme Electoral Tribunal legalized the political party. Before the 2023 general election, the party approached former president Alfonso Portillo to form an alliance, but was unsuccessful.

According to Peña, the political party is named because the elephant it is the first animal name that Guatemalan children learn to read and write. In addition, the elephant has special qualities and is related to the community.

In February 2023, Elephant Community nominated Hugo Peña Medina and Hugo Johnson López as presidential ticket. The party nominated deputies and mayors linked to the National Convergence Front, National Welfare and Vision with Values as candidates.

In the 2023 general election, Peña Medina obtained 0.94% and 17th place. The party obtained two deputies: one for the National List and the other for Guatemala Department. Elephant Community won the mayoralties of Alotenango and Samayac.

== Electoral history ==
=== Presidential elections ===
Election	Candidates		First round		Second round		Status
Election	President	Vice President	Votes	%	Votes	%	Status
2023	Hugo Peña	Hugo Johnson	39,271	0.93 (#17)	—	—	Lost ✗

=== Legislative elections ===
Election	Votes	%	Seats	+/–	Status
2023	95,435	2.29 (#14)	2 / 160	New	Opposition
