= Citizen Prosperity =

Citizen Prosperity Prosperidad Ciudadana
- Secretary-General: Lilian Piedad García Contreras
- Founded: June 26, 2016
- Legalised: November 12, 2018
- Dissolved: January 8, 2024
- Succeeded by: Serve
- Ideology: Populism; Decentralization
- Political position: Centre-right
- Colors: Blue
- Seats in Congress: 0 / 160

Prosperidad Ciudadana (lit. 'Citizen Prosperity') was a political party in Guatemala.

== History ==
Citizen Prosperity started as a political party in formation; on June 26, 2016 the political party was registered by the Supreme Electoral Tribunal, and its registration process ended on June 25, 2019. In 2018-19, it had 20,000 members, its general secretary is Dami Anita Elizabeth Kristenson Sales. The mayors of Moyuta and Villa Nueva seek to join the party and use it as a probable electoral platform in 2019. In November 12, 2018, the political organization concluded the requirements and was made official as a political party in the same month.

== Electoral history ==
=== Presidential elections ===
Election	Candidates		First round		Second round		Status
Election	President	Vice President	Votes	%	Votes	%	Status
2019	Edwin Escobar	Blanca Alfaro	—N/a	—N/a	—N/a	—N/a	Disqualified
2023	Carlos Pineda	Efraín Orozco	—N/a	—N/a	—N/a	—N/a	Disqualified

=== Legislative elections ===
Election	Votes	%	Seats	+/–	Status
2019	131,694	3.27 (#13)	3 / 160	New	External support
2023	Disqualified		0 / 160	▼3	Extra-parliamentary
