= Héctor Cifuentes =

Guatemalan lawyer and politician

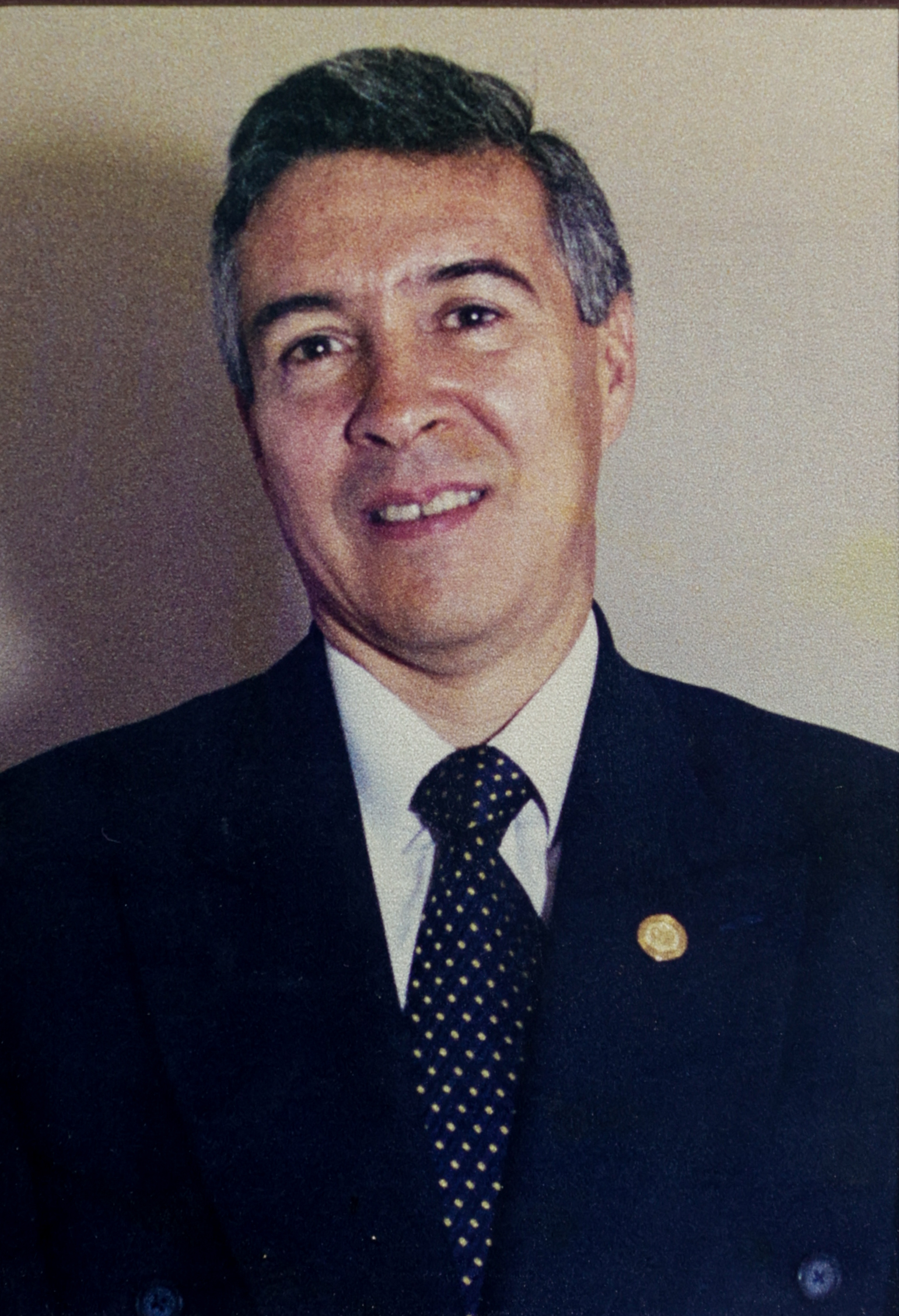

Minister of Labor and Social Welfare
- In office 14 January 1997 – 14 January 1998
- President: Álvaro Arzú
- Preceded by: Arnoldo Ortíz Moscoso
- Succeeded by: Luis Linares López

Member of the Congress
- In office 14 January 2000 – 14 January 2004
- Constituency: Guatemala City

Personal details
- Born: Héctor Adolfo Cifuentes Mendoza; 1951 (age 74–75)
- Party: Unionist Party
- Other political affiliations: National Advancement Party

Héctor Adolfo Cifuentes Mendoza (born in 1951) is a Guatemalan attorney and politician who served as Minister of Labor and Social Welfare from 1997 to 1998. He was the vice presidential nominee in the 2023 election running alongside Zury Ríos.

== Biography ==
Cifuentes graduated as a lawyer from Universidad de San Carlos de Guatemala. He became involved in the political project of Álvaro Arzú and quickly became one of his closest collaborators. He was one of the founding members of the National Advancement Party (PAN), where he was elected as Secretary-General.

In 1996, President Álvaro Arzú appointed Cifuentes as Secretary General of the Presidency. In January 1997, Arzú reshuffled his cabinet and Cifuentes took over as Minister of Labor. Arzú made a second reshuffle in his cabinet in January 1998, and Cifuentes again took over as Secretary General of the Presidency.

Cifuentes was elected as a member of the Congress in the 1999 Guatemalan general election. He took office in January 2000. A few months later, he resigned from the National Advancement Party and supported Álvaro Arzú in founding the Unionist Party.

After leaving Congress, Cifuentes was chosen by Mayor Álvaro Arzú as the Secretary General of the Municipality of Guatemala.
