= Active Citizens of Electoral Formation =

Active Citizens of Electoral Formation Ciudadanos Activos en Formación Electoral
- Secretary-General: Dinora Cabrera Vargas
- Founded: 2015
- Dissolved: September 28, 2018
- Ideology: Humanism
- Political position: Right-wing
- Seats in Congress: 0 / 158

Active Citizens of Electoral Formation was a political party in Guatemala.

== History ==
Active Citizens of Electoral Formation was founded in 2011. The founder of the party is Dinora Cabrera, and the ideology of the party is Humanist, CAFE was registered in the Supreme Electoral Tribunal in 2015 upon reaching the number of members required for registration. It has been suspended since 2016 by the same electoral body. It was canceled in July 2018 for not having the necessary requirements for its validity.
