= Carlos Pineda =

Carlos Pineda may refer to:

- Carlos Pineda (footballer), a Honduran footballer
- Carlos Pineda (politician), candidate for president of Guatemala
