= Allan Rodriguez =

Allan Rodriguez may refer to:

- Allan Rodriguez (soccer), an American soccer player
- Allan Rodríguez, a Guatemalan politician
