= Giammattei =

Giammattei is a surname. Notable people with the surname include:

- Alejandro Giammattei (born 1956), Guatemalan politician
- Marcela Giammattei, Guatemalan lawyer and politician, daughter of Alejandro
