= Fuerza (disambiguation) =

Fuerza may refer to:

- Fuerza, an album by Alejandra Guzmán
- La Fuerza, a 2022 EP by Christina Aguilera
- La Fuerza, the first fortress in Havana, Cuba
- Fuerza (Guatemala), a 2011-2020 political party
- Fuerza (comics), a DC Comics character
