= Giamatti =

Giamatti (/ˌdʒiːəˈmɑːti/ JEE-ə-MAH-tee) is an American surname, a variant of Italian Giammattei (Italian pronunciation: [dʒammatˈtɛi]). The surname is derived from the given name Gian Matteo, from Italian forms for 'John' and 'Matthew'. Notable people with the surname include:

- A. Bartlett Giamatti (1938–1989), President of Yale University and later Commissioner of Major League Baseball
- Marcus Giamatti (born 1961), American actor, son of Bart and brother of Paul
- Paul Giamatti (born 1967), American actor, son of Bart
