= Arabella Castro Quiñónez =

Guatemalan politician

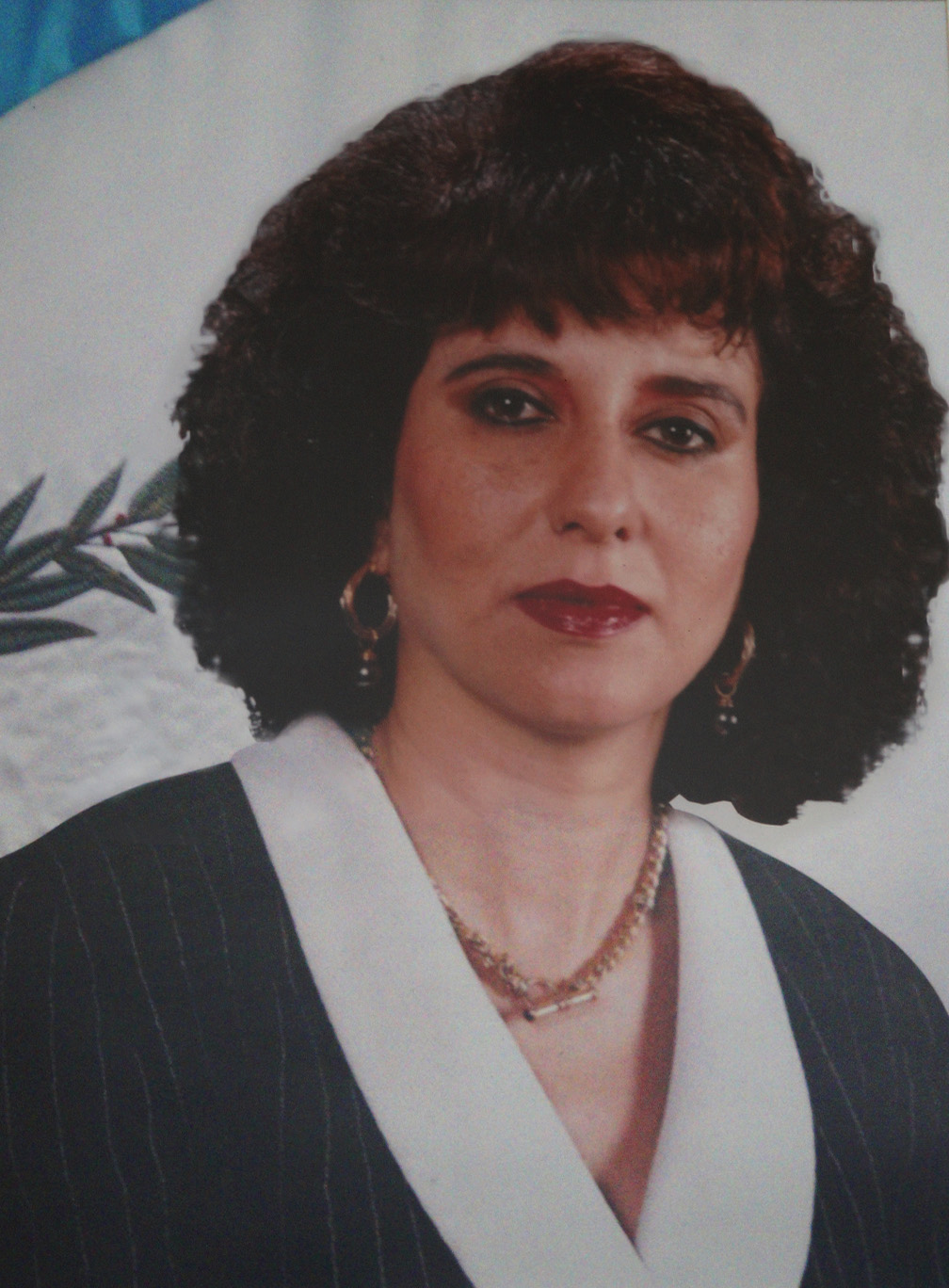
- Official portrait as the Minister of Education

President of the Congress of Guatemala
- In office 14 January 1997 – 14 January 1998
- Preceded by: Carlos Alberto García Regás
- Succeeded by: Rafael Eduardo Barrios Flores
- In office 13 September 1994 – 14 January 1995
- Preceded by: Óscar Vinicio Villar Anleu
- Succeeded by: Efraín Ríos Montt

Minister of Education
- In office 14 January 1998 – 20 April 1999
- President: Álvaro Arzú Irigoyen
- Preceded by: Roberto Moreno Godoy
- Succeeded by: Roberto Moreno Godoy
- In office 14 January 1996 – 14 January 1997
- President: Álvaro Arzú Irigoyen
- Preceded by: Celestino Tay Coyoy
- Succeeded by: Roberto Moreno Godoy

Member of the Congress of Guatemala
- In office 14 January 1991 – 14 January 2000
- Constituency: National List

Personal details
- Born: 1955 (age 69–70); San Sebastián Huehuetenango, Guatemala
- Political party: National Advancement Party

Arabella Elizabeth Castro Quiñónez (born in 1955) is a Guatemalan lawyer and former politician who served as President of the Congress from 1994 to 1995 and from 1997 to 1998. She was also Minister of Education during the government of Álvaro Arzú and a candidate for Vice President in 1999, running alongside former mayor of Guatemala City, Óscar Berger.
