= Óscar Chinchilla =

Guatemalan politician

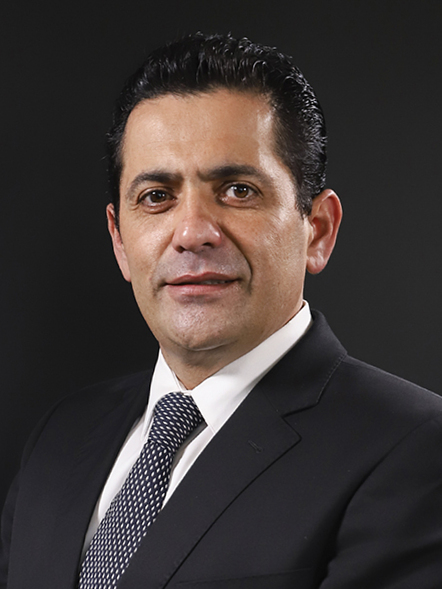
- Official portrait

President of the Congress of Guatemala
- In office 14 January 2017 – 14 January 2018
- Preceded by: Mario Taracena
- Succeeded by: Álvaro Arzú Escobar

Personal details
- Born: 21 October 1969 (age 55)
- Political party: Commitment, Renewal and Order

Óscar Stuardo Chinchilla Guzmán (born 21 October 1969) is a Guatemalan politician who served as President of the Congress of Guatemala between January 14, 2017 and January 14, 2018.

Chinchilla is a member and one of the founders of Commitment, Renewal and Order. He was elected to the Congress of Guatemala in the 2011 election and the 2015 election. He serves for the District of Guatemala. In the 2012 legislative year he was third vice-president.

Chinchilla obtained a degree in engineering from the Universidad de San Carlos de Guatemala. He served on the municipal council of Villa Nueva between 2004 and 2008.

Chinchilla lost re-election in the 2023 general election. He left Congress on 14 January 2024.
