= Ana Catalina Soberanis =

First female President of the Congress of Guatemala

President of the Congress of Guatemala
- In office 1991 – 1992
- Preceded by: Marco Antonio Dardón Castillo
- Succeeded by: Edmond Mulet

Personal details
- Born: November 14, 1948 (age 77) Guatemala City
- Party: Christian Democracy
- Education: Rafael Landivar University
- Occupation: Consultant
- Profession: Lawyer

Ana Catalina Soberanis Reyes (born 14 November 1948) is a lawyer and consultant who served as the first female president of the Congress of Guatemala.

== Early life and education ==
Catalina Soberanis was born in Guatemala on 14 November 1948. She graduated as a lawyer and has a postgraduate degree in Indigenous People's Law. She also has certifications in other studies, such as Political Organization and Management, Analysis and Resolution of Conflicts.

== Career ==
Soberanis was one of only three women out of 88 members of the Assembly that drafted the Guatemalan Constitution in 1984. She was Secretary of Labor (1986–1990) during the government of Vinicio Cerezo and Secretary of Peace (2000–2004) for Alfonso Portillo. In addition, the former leader of Congress was candidate for president of Guatemala in 1999.

=== Presidency of Congress ===
Soberanis became president of the Congress of Guatemala in 1991, after having been leader of the Christian Democracy members.

=== Post-presidency ===
She is a consultant for the United Nations Development Programme (UNDP) in Guatemala and a university professor.

== Legacy ==
She made history by being the first female president of the Congress of Guatemala.

== See also ==
- Claudia Paz y Paz - First female Attorney General in Guatemala
- Roxana Baldetti - First female Vice President of Guatemala
