= Guatemalan Social Democratic Party (2015) =

Guatemalan Social Democratic Party Partido Socialdemócrata de Guatemala
- Secretary-General: Carlos Alfonso González Quezada
- Founded: 2005
- Dissolved: August 1, 2018
- Ideology: Social democracy
- Political position: Left-wing
- Seats in Congress: 0 / 158

Guatemalan Social Democratic Party was a political party in Guatemala.

== History ==
The political party was registered in 2005 by Carlos Alfonso González Quezada. Guatemalan Social Democratic Party was suspended for not having the necessary affiliates. It was canceled in July 2018 for not having the necessary requirements for its validity.
