= Cabal (political party) =

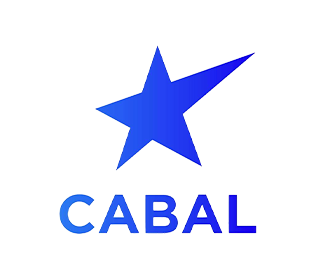
- Leader: Roberto Arzú
- Secretary-General: Luis Aguirre
- Founded: 27 November 2020
- Legalised: 24 July 2022
- Split from: Humanist Party of Guatemala
- Ideology: Liberalism; Populism
- Political position: Centre to centre-right
- Colors: Blue
- Seats in Congress: 18 / 160

Cabal is a political party in Guatemala led by Edmond Mulet. In English, the party's name can be translated literally as "thorough", or colloquially as "exact" or "spot on".

== History ==
The Humanist Party of Guatemala was founded by Edmond Mulet in 2017, and became his political platform to run for the 2019 presidential election. Mulet, favored by his international experience, came in third place. The Humanist Party won six seats in Congress.

In January 2020, the Humanist Party declared itself "in opposition" to the government of Alejandro Giammattei, but within a few months the party became part of the ruling coalition. Mulet denounced the act and resigned his membership of the party.

In November 2020, Mulet announced his new political platform "Cabal". In July 2022, the party was registered by the Supreme Electoral Tribunal.

In 2022, the party announced that Mulet would run for president again in 2023, with Máximo Santa Cruz being selected as the vice-presidential candidate.

The alliance between Cabal and the government of Bernardo Arévalo began to weaken in March 2024 and broke down in the middle of the year. Most of Cabal's deputies became increasingly critical of President Arévalo's government and have shown themselves to be closer to the opposition than to the ruling party.

== Electoral history ==
=== Presidential elections ===
Election	Candidates		First round		Second round		Status
Election	President	Vice President	Votes	%	Votes	%	Status
2023	Edmond Mulet	Máximo Santa Cruz	371,857	8.85	—N/a	—N/a	Lost ✗

=== Legislative elections ===
Election	Votes	%	Seats	+/–	Status
2023	371,215	8.90 (#4)	18 / 160	New	External support (2024; 2024–present)
2023	371,215	8.90 (#4)	18 / 160	New	Opposition (2024)
