= Máximo Santa Cruz =

Guatemalan politician

Máximo Augusto Santa Cruz Anchissi (born in 1968) is a Guatemalan diplomat and politician. He was the vice presidential nominee in the 2023 election running alongside presidential nominee Edmond Mulet.

== Biography ==
Santa Cruz was appointed as the Guatemalan Consul General in Miami, Florida in 1996. He later became involved in national politics and was appointed as private cecretary to Vice President Eduardo Stein from 2004 to 2008. Stein appointed Santa Cruz as National Executive Director for Guatemala in the Trifinio Plan in 2006.

Santa Cruz was an unsuccessful candidate for deputy for the National Development Action (ADN) party in the 2011 general election. In 2012, Santa Cruz was appointed advisor by Commissioner Adela de Torrebiarte in the Ministry of the Interior. Later, he was an unsuccessful candidate for syndic in the 2019 Guatemala City mayoral election for Commitment, Renewal and Order.

Santa Cruz was announced as Edmond Mulet's running mate by Cabal in the 2023 general election.
