= Fritz García Gallont =

Guatemalan politician

Fritz García Gallont (born 9 August 1955) is a Guatemalan politician. He is a member of the Unionist Party. He served as Minister of Communications under President Álvaro Arzú. He served as Mayor of Guatemala City from 2000 to 2004. In 2003, his bid for the presidency was unsuccessful. He is the vice president of the Guatemalan Chamber of Commerce.
