= Isaac Farchi =

Guatemalan politician

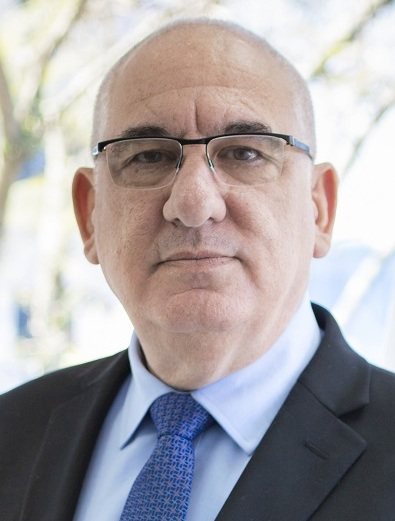
- Farchi in 2020

Deputy of the Congress of Guatemala
- In office 14 January 1996 – 14 January 2000

Personal details
- Born: June 12, 1960 (age 65) Guatemala City
- Party: Blue Party
- Other political affiliations: Vision with Values; Guatemalan Republican Front (until 1998); National Advancement Party (until 2018)
- Spouse: Rita de Farchi
- Children: Ruthy Farchi, Jacob Farchi, Sarah Farchi, Nissim Farchi

Isaac Farchi Sultán (born 12 June 1960) is a Guatemalan businessman and politician. He is the son of the businessman Nissim Farchi Finkelstain, an Israeli born in Bulgaria, and Vilma Sultan Berchowitz, a Guatemalan of Israeli origin. Farchi was the first Jew to hold a public office in Guatemala. He ran as a presidential candidate in the 2019 and 2023 general elections, placing fifth place in the latter election. He is currently the Government Commissioner for Investment and Tourism of Guatemala.
