= Manuel Baldizón =

Guatemalan politician, lawyer, and hotel entrepreneur

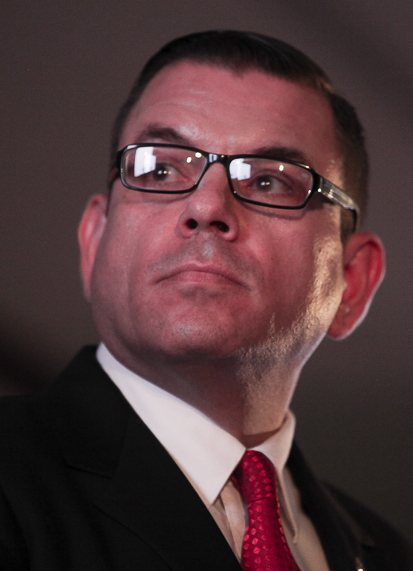

Member of the Congress of Guatemala
- In office 14 January 2004 – 14 January 2008

Personal details
- Born: Manuel Antonio Baldizón Méndez; 6 May 1970 (age 56) Flores, El Petén, Guatemala
- Party: Change (since 2022); LIDER (2009–2015); UNE (2006–2008); PAN (2003–2006)
- Spouse: Rosa Maria Vargas
- Children: 2
- Education: Universidad de San Carlos de Guatemala; University of Salamanca
- Profession: Lawyer, businessman

Manuel Antonio Baldizón Méndez (Latin American Spanish: [maˈnwel anˈtonjo βaldiˈsom ˈmendes], born 6 May 1970) is a Guatemalan politician, lawyer, and hotel entrepreneur. He was the leader of the "Libertad Democrática Renovada" (LIDER) Renewed Democratic Liberty party and was a candidate in the 2015 presidential election placing third and losing to Jimmy Morales. He was also a candidate in the 2011 presidential election, placing second and losing to Otto Pérez Molina in a run-off vote. On January 20, 2018, he was captured in the United States, when he was accused of accepting bribes from Odebrecht.

== Early life and education ==
Manuel Baldizón originates from Amatitlan. He completed his military service in the infantry as Second Lieutenant of the reserve in 1987. In 2000, he received his licentiate degree in jurisprudence and social science, licence as solicitor and notary from the Universidad Mariano Galvez. Baldizón added postgradual studies at the University of Valparaíso, Chile, which he completed with an MBA with honorable mentions. In 2004, he obtained his doctorate in law from the Universidad de San Carlos de Guatemala. Afterwards, he took post-doctoral courses at the University of Salamanca, Spain.

== Political career ==
He was elected to the Congress for the National Advancement Party (PAN) in 2003, but joined the National Unity of Hope (UNE) of Álvaro Colom in 2006. Baldizón was re-elected as a Congressman in 2007. He defected from the governing UNE in 2009 and founded the LIDER party. In the 2011 general election, Manuel Baldizón was a presidential candidate. His running mate was Raquel Blandón, ex-wife of former president Vinicio Cerezo. In the first round on 11 September, he won 1,004,215 votes (22.68%) and qualified for the runoff on 6 November. However he was defeated by the retired general Otto Pérez Molina of the Patriotic Party in this second turn, winning 1,980,819 votes (46.26%).

On 3 May 2015 Baldizón was named the presidential candidate for LIDER for the 2015 elections.

He is accused of receiving money from Odebrecht. The Brazilian construction company has admitted to paying multi-million dollar bribes to public officials in multiple countries to in order to win public contracts. In January 2018, he was detained in Miami in response to an Interpol arrest warrant on graft charges.

He was convicted of conspiracy to commit money laundering, and served 28 months in a federal prison. Baldizón was removed from the United States on October 5th, where custody was transferred to authorities in Guatemala.

== Personal life ==
Manuel Baldizón is married to Rosa María Vargas de Baldizón and has two children, Manuel Antonio and Jorge Eduardo. During his 2011 presidential campaign, his family was reportedly threatened by people claiming to be members of Los Zetas. In later years, his two sons became involved in Guatemalan politics, including through the Cambio political party.

== Characterization ==
In press, Manuel Baldizón has been described as a multimillionaire, a populist, a devout Christian, and a proponent of the death penalty. Special interest has been attracted by his promises to lead Guatemala's football team to the World Cup.

Also during his political rallies, he has been noted to bring security weapons of high caliber. Even though Article 125 of "The Arms and Ammunition Law" of the Guatemalan constitucion it specifies that only the Guatemalan Army is authorized to carry such weapons.

== Plagiarism ==
On 20 January 2014, Baldizon released a book called Rompiendo Paradigmas (Breaking Paradigms). He held a presentation in Guatemala City only to have the book removed from the bookshelves two days later because evidence was found that a significant portion of the book's contents had been copied from other sources without properly providing reference to them or asking for permission. Baldizón's public relations office quickly responded to the accusations. The office said that, in the book's introduction, the author “clearly establishes that the book not only contains the author’s own ideas, but those of many people, including academics and authors.” They also encouraged readers to take the book as “a fusion of ideas,” and offered apologies to anyone who took offense. However, the magazine ContraPoder showed clear evidence that at least seven pages of the book used materials without proper citation in its bibliography. As a result, Manuel Baldizon's doctorate thesis was reviewed by the media, and it was found that most of it was also plagiarized. Despite the revelations, the Universidad San Carlos de Guatemala said they approved of the thesis after a review process, allowing Baldizon to keep his title.
