= 2015 Guatemalan general election =

- Presidential election
- 6 September 2015 (first round); 25 October 2015 (second round)
- Turnout: 69.74% (first round) ▲0.88pp 56.15% (second round) ▼4.49pp
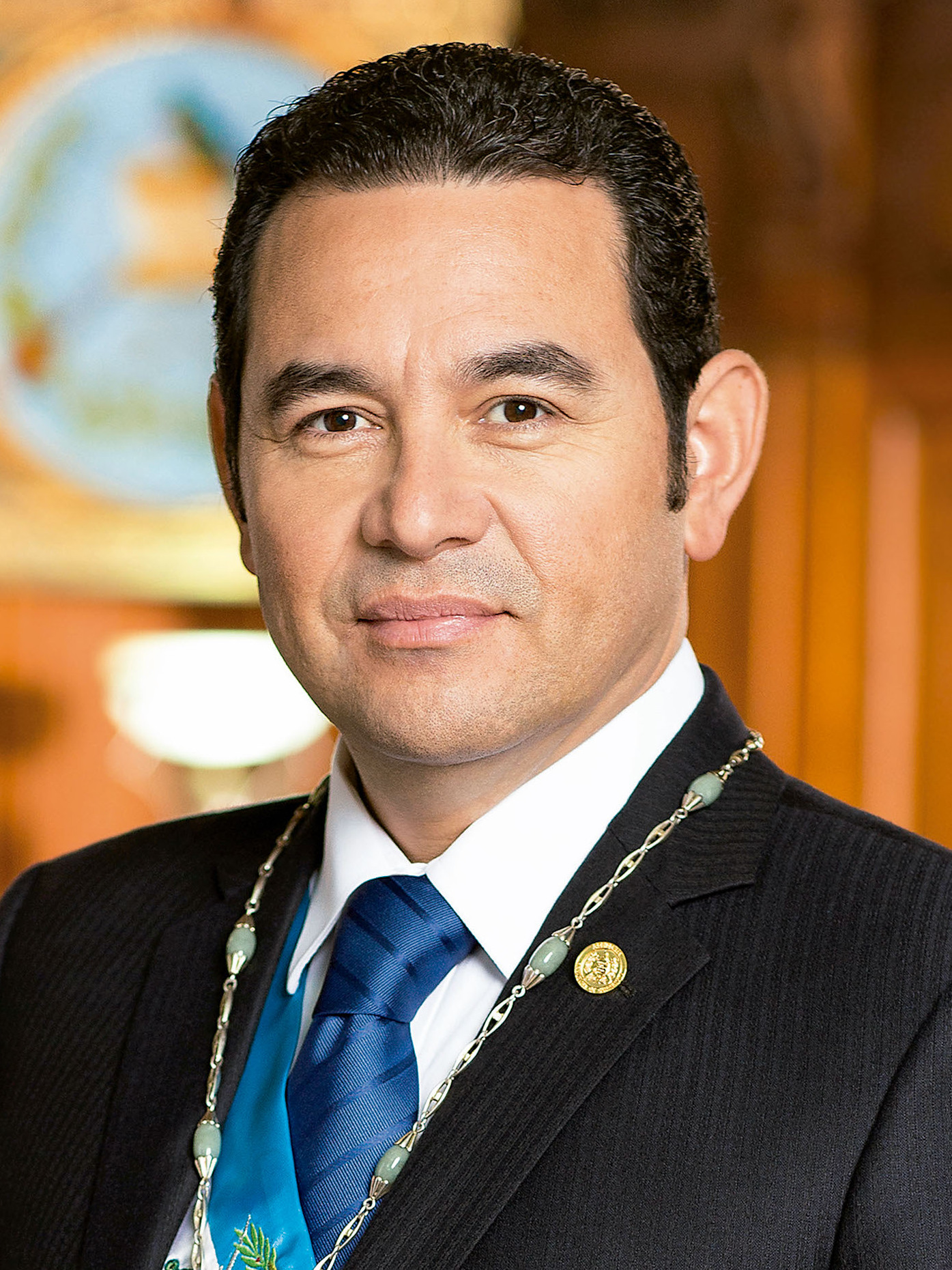

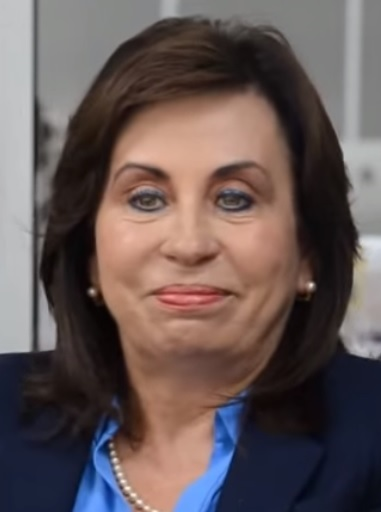
Nominee	Jimmy Morales	Sandra Torres
Party	FCN	UNE
Running mate	Jafeth Cabrera	Mario Leal
Popular vote	2,751,058	1,328,342
Percentage	67.44%	32.56%
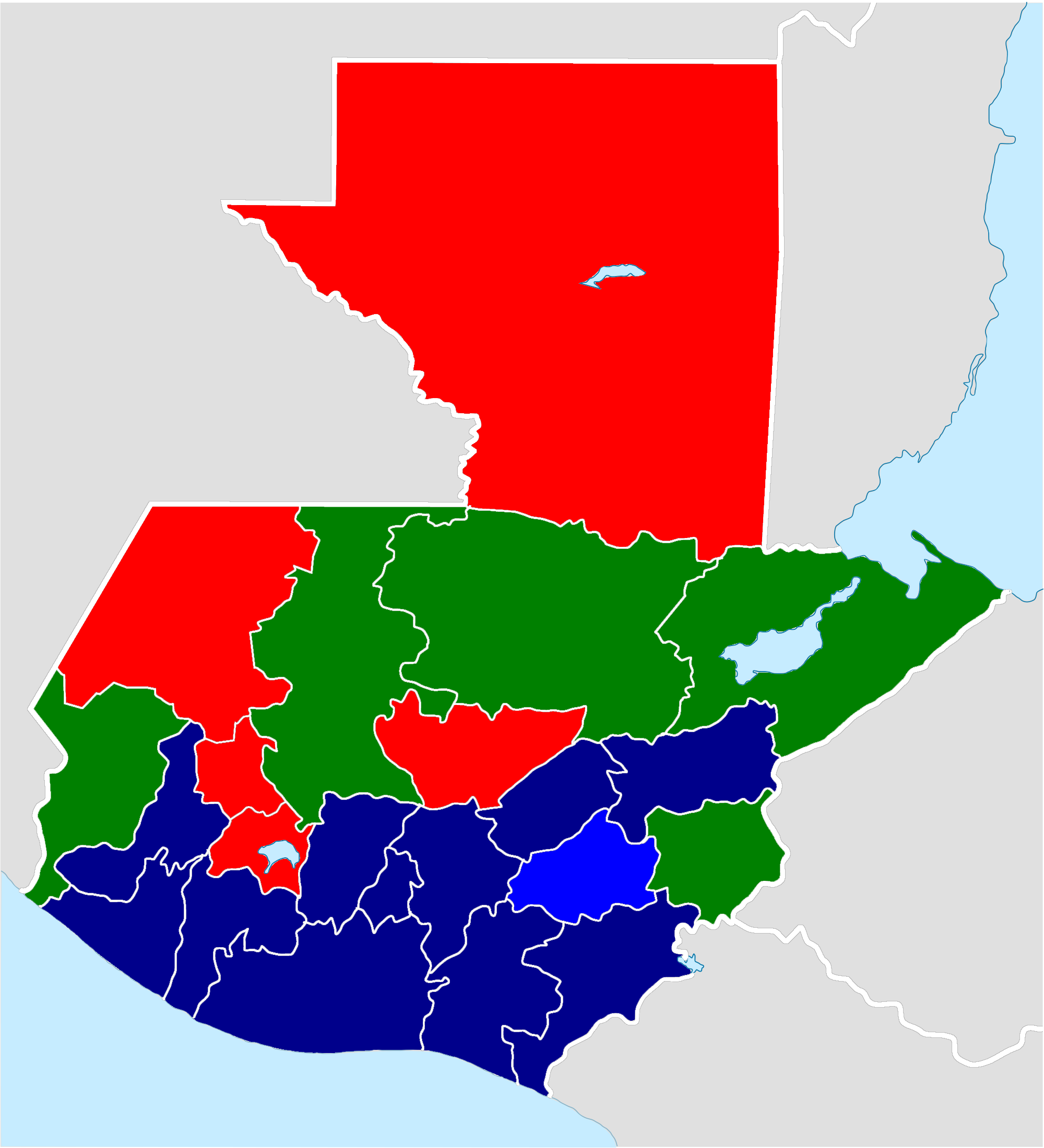
- First round results by department: Dark blue for Morales; red for Baldizón; green for Torres; and light blue for Estrada.
President before election
Alejandro Maldonado
Independent
President-elect
Jimmy Morales
FCN

General elections were held in Guatemala on 6 September 2015 to elect the President and Vice President, all 158 Congress deputies, all 20 deputies to the Central American Parliament, and mayors and councils for all 338 municipalities in the country.

The Renewed Democratic Liberty became the largest party in Congress with 44 seats. Since no presidential candidate received more than 50% of the vote, a run-off took place on 25 October. Jimmy Morales won the contest, taking 67.4% of the vote, in a landslide victory over Sandra Torres.

It was the first presidential election since 1995 in which the runner-up of the previous contest did not then go on to win.

== Background ==
Ahead of the election, the La Linea corruption case involving high-ranking officials of the outgoing administration, including President Otto Pérez Molina and Vice President Roxana Baldetti, was made public by the International Commission against Impunity in Guatemala. Baldetti resigned in May and was arrested on fraud charges in August. More than a dozen ministers and deputy ministers as well as a number of government officials also resigned. Less than a week before the election, President Pérez was stripped of his immunity, resigned and was arrested. Alejandro Maldonado Aguirre acts as head of state until a new president is elected and sworn into office. The scandal has further diminished many Guatemalans' trust in the political elite. Some of the participants of mass protests against corruption demanded a postponement of the election due to the crisis and claims of irregularities.

=== Possible Belize referendum ===
In May 2015, Belize allowed Guatemala to proceed with a referendum asking the International Court of Justice (ICJ) to definitively rule on Guatemala's longstanding territorial dispute against Belize, although Belize by its own admission was not ready for such a vote. A previous treaty between the two countries stipulated that any such vote must be held simultaneously. Guatemala was initially expected to hold its referendum on the issue during its second round of presidential elections in October 2015. Belize has yet to announce its vote on the matter.

When Jimmy Morales was running for president, a Guatemalan journalist asked Morales which Guatemalan historical event he thought was the most deplorable. Morales responded, "The most deplorable event – among all the things that have happened in Guatemala, there are certain things that are not spoken about and which I believe we should. Everything that goes contrary to national unity and territorial integrity are things that should hurt us. Something is happening right now, we are about to lose Belize. We have not lost it yet. We still have the possibility of going to the International Court of Justice where we can fight that territory or part of that territory. ... I think that it is worth anything that is natural resources and of benefit to the nation."

== Electoral system ==
The President of Guatemala is elected using the two-round system. The 158 members of Congress are elected by two methods; 31 members are elected by closed list proportional representation in a single nationwide constituency, with seats allocated using the d'Hondt method. The other 127 seats are elected in 23 multi-member constituencies based on the departments (with the Central District or Guatemala City as a separate constituency) also using the d'Hondt method.

Around 7.5 million people registered for the elections. Members of the armed forces (Air Force, Army, and Navy), people in prison, and Guatemalans living abroad were not allowed to vote. The Tribunal Supremo Electoral (Supreme Electoral Tribunal) officially called for general elections on 2 May 2015.

== Campaign ==
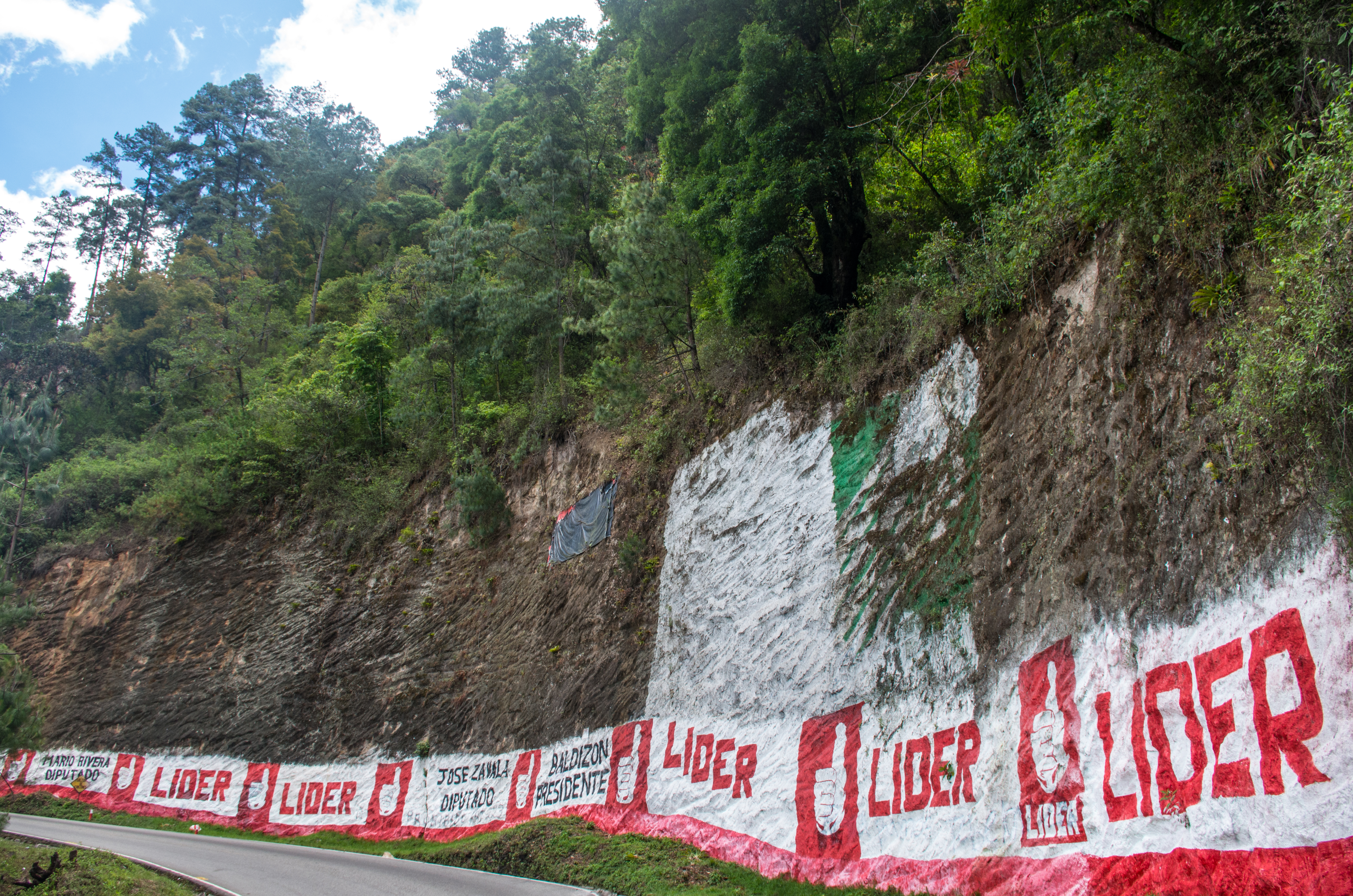
LIDER party campaign posters

A total of 14 candidates were registered to contest the presidential elections:

- Manuel Baldizón Mendez – Renewed Democratic Liberty (LIDER); born 1970; lawyer, entrepreneur, former Congressman, defeated in the runoff of the 2012 presidential election
- Mario David García – Patriotic Party (PP); born 1946; lawyer and journalist, presenter of the political radio broadcast Hablando Claro ("Straight Talk")
- Sandra Torres Casanova – National Unity of Hope (UNE); born 1955; former First Lady (wife of ex-president Álvaro Colom)
- Lizardo Sosa – Todos; born 1945; former president of the Bank of Guatemala (2006–2010)
- Roberto González Díaz-Durán – Commitment, Renewal and Order (CREO) + Unionist Party (PU); born 1970; entrepreneur, former minister of energy and mines (2004–05), defeated mayoral candidate of Guatemala City in 2007 and 2011
- José Ángel López – Encounter for Guatemala (EG); born 1959, entrepreneur and banker, former president of the Rural Development Bank (Banrural), former longterm head of the National Association of Coffee (Anacafé)
- Zury Ríos – Vision with Values (ViVa); born 1968; former Congresswoman, daughter of retired general, ex-President and military dictator Efraín Ríos Montt, wife of U.S. Representative Jerry Weller of Illinois
- Miguel Ángel Sandoval – Guatemalan National Revolutionary Unity (URNG-Maiz) + Winaq; born 1949; sociologist and human rights activist, former guerilla fighter, advisor to the United Nations Development Programme, unsuccessful candidate in the 2007 presidential election (2.1%)
- Jimmy Morales – National Convergence Front (FCN); born 1969, former actor, movie director and producer, known for his role in the comedy series Moralejas ("Morals") alongside his brother Sammy Morales
- Alejandro Giammattei — Fuerza; born 1956; ex-director of the penitentiary system of Guatemala, unsuccessful candidate in the 2007 and 2011 presidential elections (17.2% and 1.1%, respectively)
- Mario Estrada – National Change Union (UCN); born 1960; former Congressman, unsuccessful candidate in the 2007 and 2011 presidential elections (3.2% and 8.7%, respectively)
- Luis Fernando Pérez – Institutional Republican Party (PRI); born 1969; manager, Congressman
- Juan Guillermo Gutiérrez – National Advancement Party (PAN); born 1956; entrepreneur, unsuccessful candidate in the 2011 presidential election (2.8%)
- Aníbal García – New Republic Movement (MNR); running mate of Nobel Prize laureate and unsuccessful candidate Rigoberta Menchú in the 2011 presidential election

In the buildup to the elections the Patriotic Party (PP) and Renewed Democratic Liberty (LIDER) were suspended due to repeated offences. However, all parties were reinstated before elections were called.

== Opinion polls ==
A poll released on 3 September gave Morales 25% of the vote, compared to 22.9% for Manuel Baldizon and 18.4% for Sandra Torres.

== Results ==
=== President ===
The front runners: Morales, Baldizón and Torres, were expected to competitively compete for the position of President. In the first round, Morales gained 24% of the vote, followed by a closely fought battle between Torres and Baldizón, with less than 20,000 votes separating the two. Since no candidate received a 50% majority, the top two candidates participated in the run-off in October. Morales won the run-off contest with 67.4% of the vote to Torres' 32.6%. Morales, a comedic actor, won with the slogan "not corrupt, nor a thief".

Candidate	Running mate	Party	First round		Second round	
Candidate	Running mate	Party	Votes	%	Votes	%
Jimmy Morales	Jafeth Cabrera	National Convergence Front	1,152,394	23.99	2,751,058	67.44
Sandra Torres	Mario Leal	National Unity of Hope	948,809	19.76	1,328,342	32.56
Manuel Baldizón	Edgar Barquín	Renewed Democratic Liberty	930,905	19.38		
Alejandro Giammattei	Fernando Paiz	Fuerza	313,628	6.53		
Zury Ríos	Juan Luis Mirón	Vision with Values	286,730	5.97		
Lizardo Sosa	Mario García	Todos	259,673	5.41		
Mario David García	Valentin Gramajo	Patriotic Party	214,532	4.47		
Roberto González Díaz-Durán	Rodolfo Neutze Aguirre	CREO–Unionist Party	166,960	3.48		
Mario Estrada	Roberto Díaz-Durán	National Change Union	163,974	3.41		
Juan Guillermo Gutiérrez	Manuel Alfredo Marroquín Pineda	National Advancement Party	149,925	3.12		
Miguel Ángel Sandoval	Mario Ellintong	Winaq–URNG–MAIZ	101,347	2.11		
José Ángel López	Peter Lamport	Encuentro por Guatemala	43,916	0.91		
Luis Fernando Pérez	José Rodolfo Dougherty	Institutional Republican Party	41,554	0.87		
Aníbal García	Rafael Maldonado	Movimiento Nueva República	28,383	0.59		
Total			4,802,730	100.00	4,079,400	100.00
Valid votes			4,802,730	91.12	4,079,400	96.15
Invalid/blank votes			467,759	8.88	163,454	3.85
Total votes			5,270,489	100.00	4,242,854	100.00
Registered voters/turnout			7,556,873	69.74	7,556,873	56.15
Source: TSE

=== Congress ===
In Congress, Baldizón's LIDER gained 31 seats on their previous election making them the largest party with 45 seats. Torres' UNE retained second position with 32 seats, despite losing 16. Competing in their first election, Todos captured 18 seats. PP suffered the greatest loss, losing 38 seats overall, down to 18. Morales' FCN gained 11 seats.

Party	National			District			Total seats	+/–
Party	Votes	%	Seats	Votes	%	Seats	Total seats	+/–
Renewed Democratic Liberty	860,783	18.88	7	903,644	19.29	38	45	+31
National Unity of Hope	676,080	14.83	5	728,106	15.54	27	32	–16
Todos	445,996	9.78	3	495,129	10.57	15	18	New
Patriotic Party	419,353	9.20	3	501,029	10.70	15	18	–39
National Convergence Front	403,086	8.84	3	338,060	7.22	8	11	+11
Encuentro por Guatemala	289,646	6.35	2	217,612	4.65	5	7	–
CREO–Unionist Party	261,040	5.73	2	269,939	5.76	3	5	–8
National Change Union	244,788	5.37	2	264,437	5.65	5	7	–7
Winaq–URNG–MAIZ	198,715	4.36	1	45,731	0.98	0	1	–
Convergence	175,515	3.85	1	167,363	3.57	2	3	New
Vision with Values	168,707	3.70	1	237,118	5.06	4	5	–
National Advancement Party	158,309	3.47	1	113,354	2.42	2	3	+1
Fuerza	95,392	2.09	0	92,244	1.97	2	2	New
Institutional Republican Party	58,811	1.29	0	62,763	1.34	0	0	–1
Movimiento Nueva República	41,954	0.92	0	44,443	0.95	0	0	New
Reform Movement	36,693	0.80	0	39,295	0.84	0	0	New
Heart New Nation	23,880	0.52	0	13,992	0.30	0	0	New
Guatemalan National Revolutionary Unity				112,123	2.39	1	1	–
Winaq				29,924	0.64	0	0	–
Mi Pais				6,452	0.14	0	0	0
Commitment, Renewal and Order				1,375	0.03	0	0	–
Total	4,558,748	100.00	31	4,684,133	100.00	127	158	0
Valid votes	4,558,748	86.49		4,684,133	88.44			
Invalid/blank votes	712,352	13.51		612,313	11.56			
Total votes	5,271,100	100.00		5,296,446	100.00			
Registered voters/turnout	7,556,873	69.75		7,556,873	70.09			
Source: TSE

== Reactions ==
Following his victory, Morales vowed "I will try with all my heart and strength not to disappoint you." The US-based National Public Radio described this a rightward shift among voters in both the Americas and Europe.
