= Rafael Castillo Valdez =

Guatemalan politician (1928–2015)

Rafael Castillo Valdez (15 January 1928 – 17 March 2015) was a Guatemalan politician. He served as a member of the Congress of Guatemala. After this he served as Guatemala's ambassador to the United Nations in the mid-1970s. He then served as President of Congress.

Castillo also served as Guatemala's foreign minister from 1978 to 1982. During this time he often dominated the government. Many people viewed Castillo as a supporter of hardline tactics in Guatemala's Civil War. Castillo was a member of the Church of Jesus Christ of Latter-day Saints.
