= Movimiento Nueva República =

New Republic Movement Movimiento Nueva República
- English name: New Republic Movement
- Abbreviation: MNR
- Secretaria General Provisional: Aníbal García
- Founder: Rodolfo Aníbal García
- Founded: 2009
- Dissolved: 2015
- Split from: Encuentro por Guatemala
- Ideology: Socialism; Anti-imperialism; Progressivism
- Political position: Left-wing
- Seats in Congress 2008-2012: 1

Movimiento Nueva República (MNR) was a socialist Guatemalan political party, led by former congressman Aníbal García.

== History ==
The MNR was publicly founded on March 29, 2009. During the 2011 elections in Guatemala, Movimiento Nueva República participated as a part of the Frente Amplio de Izquierda, a coalition of leftist political parties including Winaq, Alternativa Nueva Nación (ANN), and the Unidad Revolucionaria Nacional Guatemalteca (URNG). Along with local and legislative candidates, current MNR congressman Aníbal García ran for vice president alongside Nobel Prize-winning Rigoberta Menchú of Winaq, the presidential candidate.

== Ideology ==
Movimiento Nueva República identifies as a leftist party, with a clear socialist-revolutionary ideals and an inclusive progressive, pluricultural and multiethnic makeup. According to its leaders, the Movement seeks to establish a New Republic to advance the following goals:

- the wellbeing of the masses
- the full expression of human rights
- equality and recognition for the diverse peoples of Guatemala.

The Movimiento also rejects all forms of imperialism and the subjugation of certain nations by others.

== 2015 election ==
In the legislative elections held on September 6, 2015, the MNR secured 43,127 votes (0.96% of the total) in the race for national-list deputies and, save for defections, will have no representation in the 2016-2020 Congress. In the presidential election held on the same day, its candidate Aníbal García received 28,427 votes (0.58%).

Having failed to secure the minimum of 5% of the popular vote or one seat in Congress, the MNR will forfeit its registration as a party.
