= Marcela Giammattei =

Guatemalan attorney and politician (born 1992)

Ana Marcela Giammattei
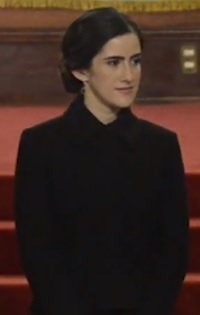
- Giammattei in 2020

Personal details
- Born: Ana Marcela Dinorah Giammattei Cáceres; 8 August 1992 (age 34) Guatemala City, Guatemala
- Parent(s): Alejandro Giammattei; Rosana Cáceres
- Education: Rafael Landívar University
- Occupation: Politician; lawyer

Ana Marcela Dinorah Giammattei Cáceres (born 8 August 1992) is a Guatemalan attorney. Giammattei is the daughter of Alejandro Giammattei, former President of Guatemala, and Rossana Cáceres.

Because her parents are separated, she accompanied her father to his inauguration on 14 January 2020 holding the Bible and Constitution. This was her only appearance at an official event during her father's presidency.

In 2024, the Department of State deemed her ineligible to enter the United States along with her father and siblings. Giammattei worked at the Central American Bank for Economic Integration but was fired in 2024.
