= Blue Party (Guatemala) =

Blue Party Partido Azul
- Leader: Nery Ramos
- Secretary-General: Jorge Mario Villagrán
- Founded: 2020
- Legalised: 25 April 2022
- Split from: Vision with Values
- Ideology: Conservatism
- Political position: Centre-right to right-wing
- Colors: Blue
- Seats in Congress: 2 / 160

Website
- partidoazul.com

Blue Party (Spanish: Partido Azul) is a political party in Guatemala.

== History ==
Blue Party was established in 2020, the leader and founder is Isaac Farchi, a Guatemalan businessman of Jewish ancestry who was a presidential candidate for Vision with Values in the 2019 general election. On 25 April 2022, the Supreme Electoral Tribunal legalized the political party.

In December 2022, Blue Party nominated Isaac Farchi and Mauricio Zaldaña as presidential ticket. According to Farchi, the political party does not have any candidate for re-election.

In the 2023 general election, Farchi obtained 1.46% and 12th place. The party obtained two deputies: one for the National List and the other for Jutiapa Department. The Blue Party won the mayoralty of Chahal, Alta Verapaz and Jalpatagua, Jutiapa.

== Electoral history ==
=== Presidential elections ===
Election	Candidates		First round		Second round		Status
Election	President	Vice President	Votes	%	Votes	%	Status
2023	Isaac Farchi	Mauricio Zaldaña	61,472	1.46 (#12)	—	—	Lost ✗

=== Legislative elections ===
Election	Votes	%	Seats	+/–	Status
2023	98,487	2.36 (#13)	2 / 160	New	External support
