= Álvaro Arzú Escobar =

Guatemalan politician

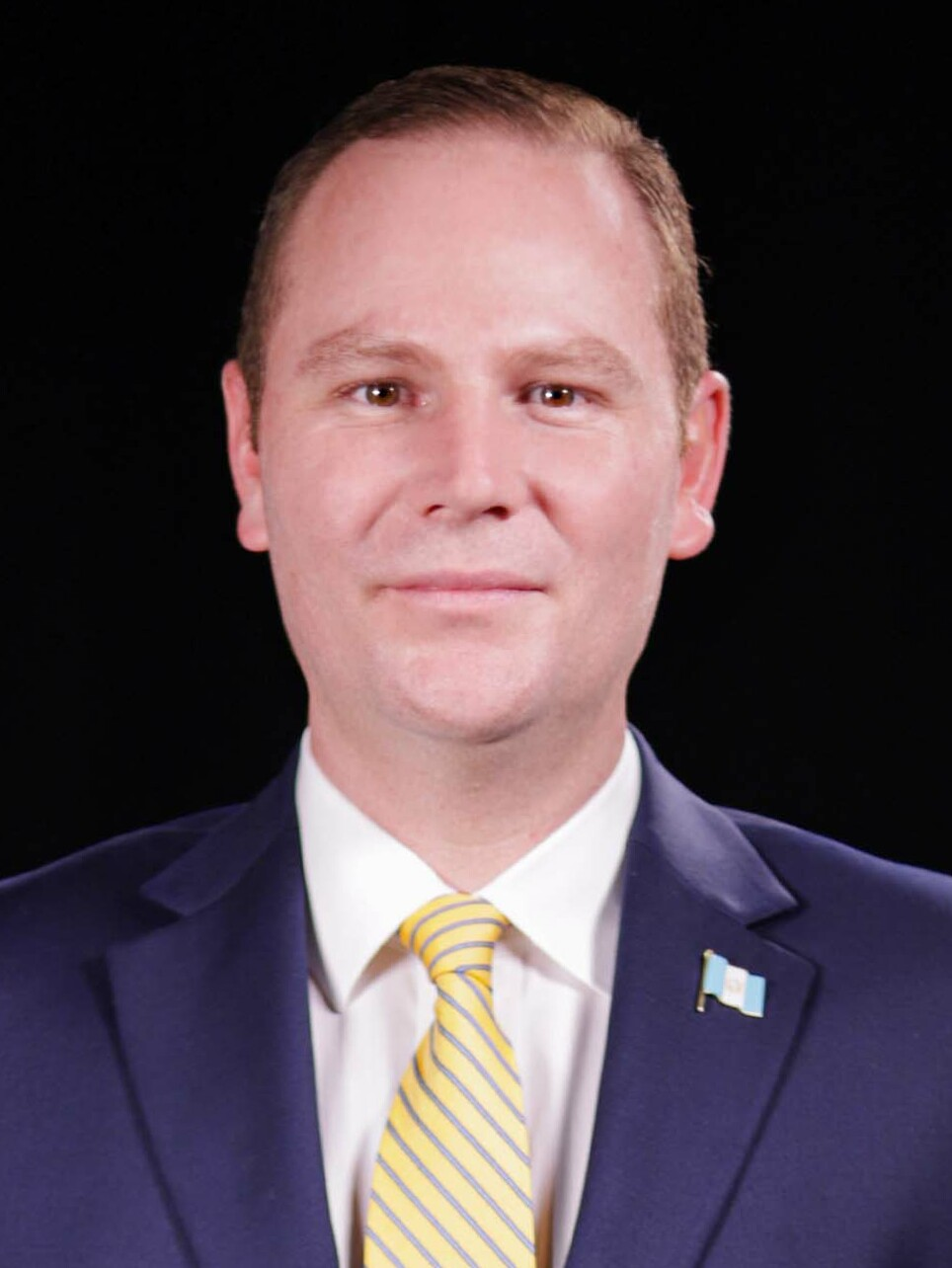
- Official portrait, 2024

President of the Congress of Guatemala
- In office 14 January 2018 – 14 January 2020
- Preceded by: Óscar Chinchilla
- Succeeded by: Allan Estuardo Rodríguez

Member of the Congress of Guatemala
- Incumbent
- Assumed office 14 January 2016
- Constituency: National List

Personal details
- Born: Álvaro Enrique Arzú Escobar; 27 February 1985 (age 40); Guatemala City
- Political party: Unionist Party
- Education: Universidad Francisco Marroquín

Álvaro Arzú Escobar (born 27 February 1985) is a Guatemalan politician from the Unionist Party who served as president of the Congress of Guatemala between 2018 and 2020. He is a son of former President of Guatemala Álvaro Arzú and First Lady Patricia Escobar.
