= Bienestar Nacional =

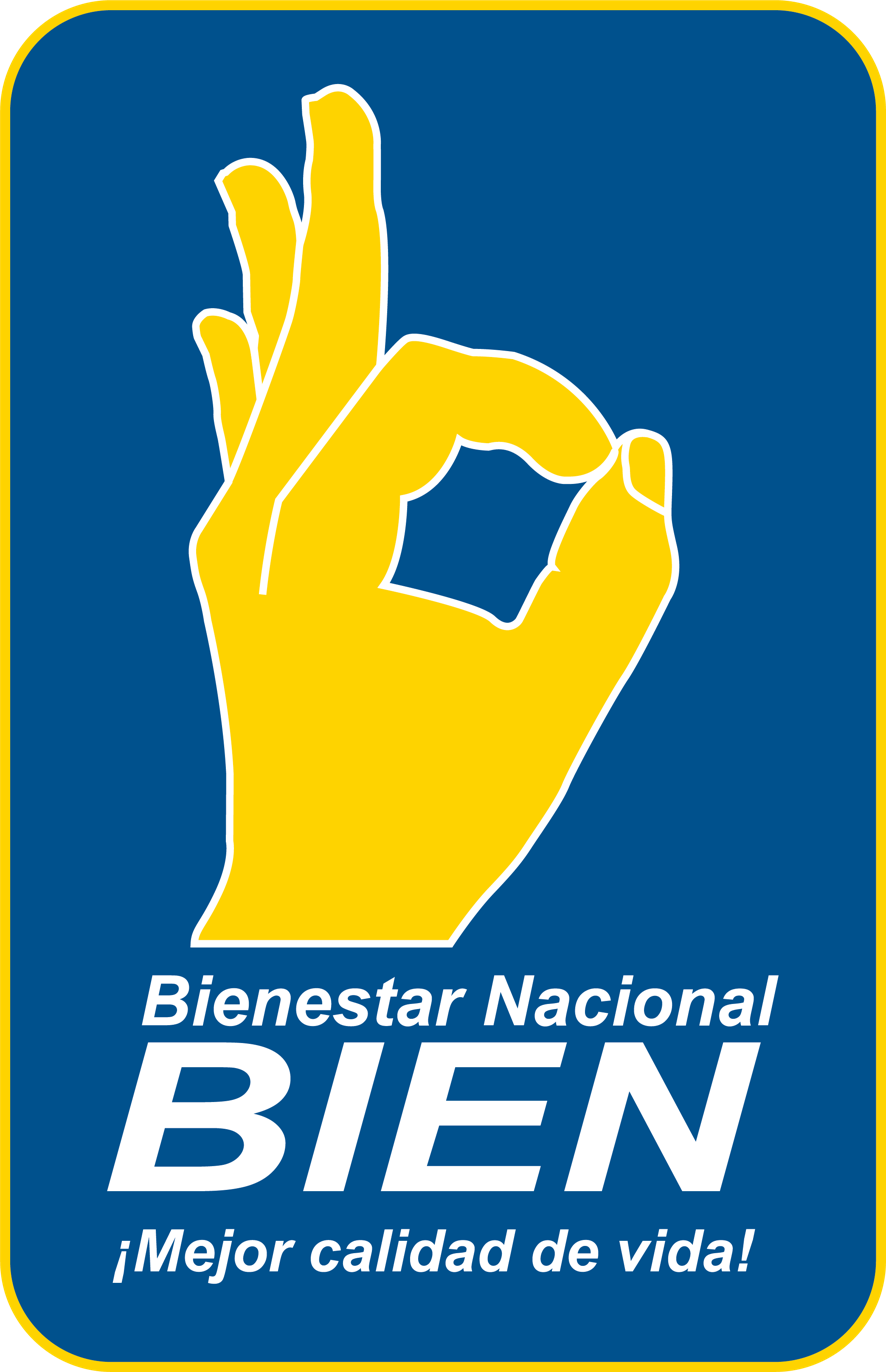
- Leader: Fidel Reyes Lee
- Secretary-General: Rubén García López
- Founded: 2002
- Ideology: Liberalism; Populism
- Political position: Right-wing
- Colors: Blue and orange
- Slogan: ¡Mejor calidad de vida! (lit. Better quality of life!)
- Seats in Congress: 4 / 160

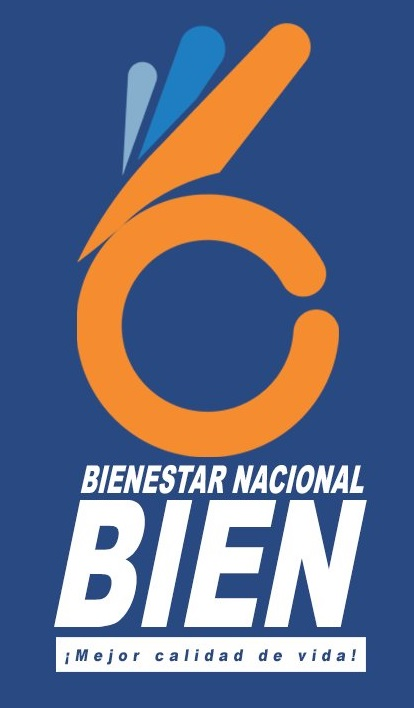
Logo

Bienestar Nacional (lit. National Well-being) is a political party in Guatemala.

== History ==
The political party was established in 2002, although it never appeared on the list of the Supreme Electoral Tribunal until 2015. It was at risk of being suspended due to lack of affiliates, but was later accepted by the Supreme Electoral Tribunal.

== Electoral history ==
=== Presidential elections ===
| Election | Candidates | | First round | | Second round | | Status |
| Election | President | Vice President | Votes | % | Votes | % | Status |
|---|---|---|---|---|---|---|---|
| 2023 | Giovanni Reyes | Óscar Figueroa | 141,714 | 3.37 | —N/a | —N/a | Lost ✗ |

=== Legislative elections ===
| Election | Votes | % | Seats | +/– | Status |
|---|---|---|---|---|---|
| 2007 | 8,921 | 0.28 (#16) | 0 / 158 | New | Extra-parliamentary |
| 2011 | Did not participate | | 0 / 158 | 0 | Extra-parliamentary |
| 2015 | Did not participate | | 0 / 158 | 0 | Extra-parliamentary |
| 2019 | 194,067 | 4.82 (#6) | 8 / 160 | ▲8 | External support |
| 2023 | 112,742 | 2.70 (#12) | 4 / 160 | ▼4 | External support |
