= Alejandro Giammattei =

President of Guatemala from 2020 to 2024

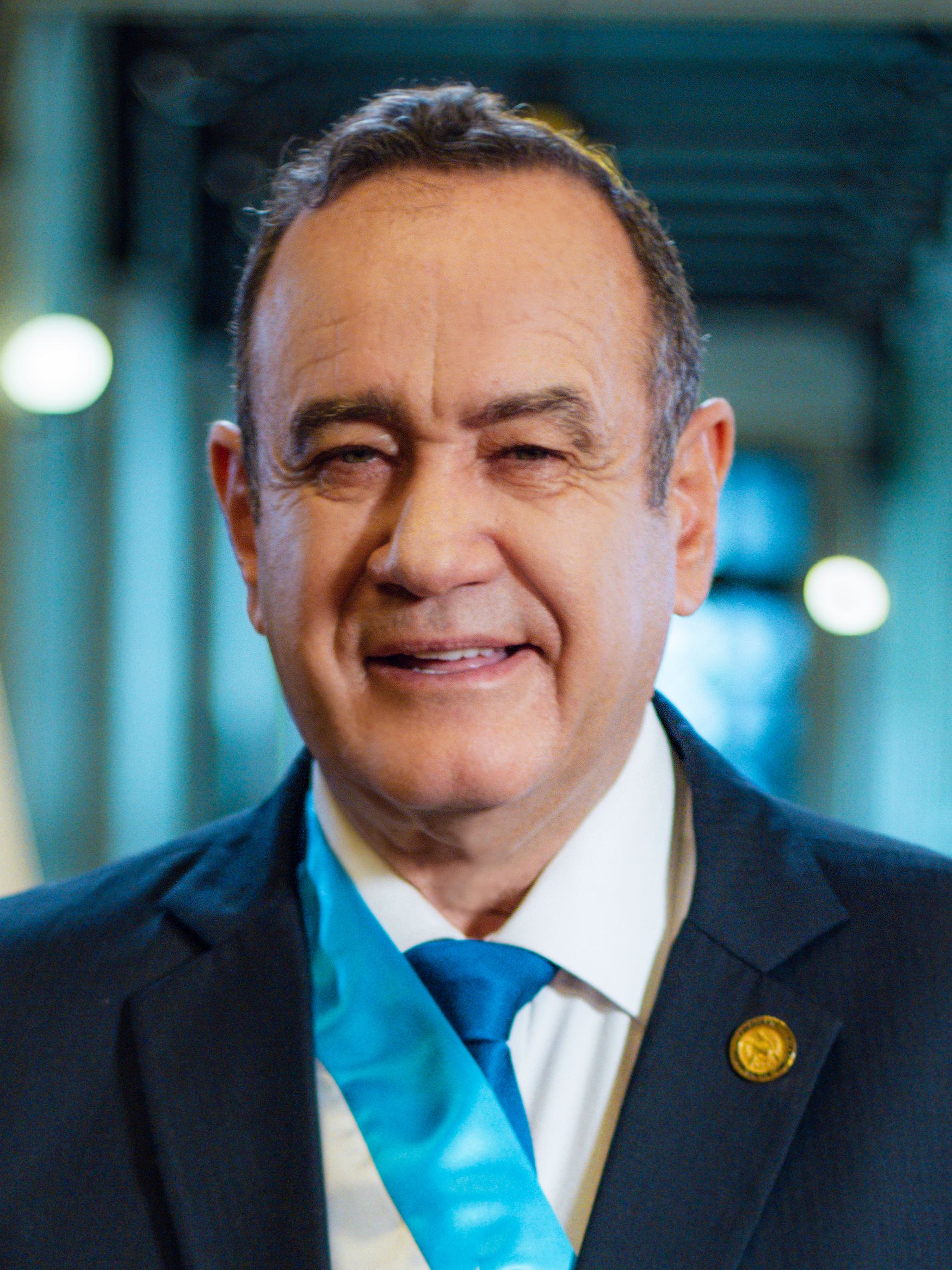
- Formal portrait, 2021

51st President of Guatemala
- In office 14 January 2020 – 14 January 2024
- Vice President: Guillermo Castillo
- Preceded by: Jimmy Morales
- Succeeded by: Bernardo Arévalo

Personal details
- Born: Alejandro Eduardo Giammattei Falla; 9 March 1956 (age 70) Guatemala City, Guatemala
- Party: Vamos
- Spouse: Rosana Cáceres (divorced)
- Children: 3, including Marcela
- Cabinet: Cabinet of Alejandro Giammattei
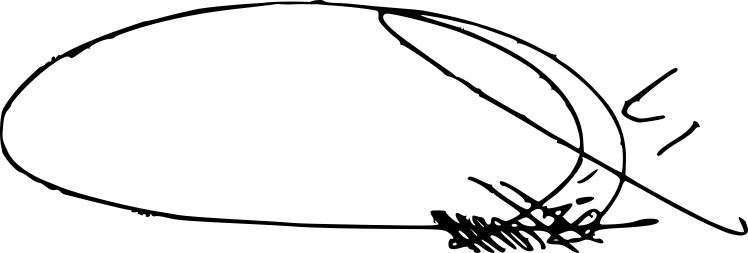
- Signature

Alejandro Eduardo Giammattei Falla (Spanish pronunciation: [aleˈxandɾo ʝamaˈtej]; (Note: In isolation, Giammattei is pronounced [ɟʝamaˈtej].) born 9 March 1956) is a Guatemalan politician who was the 51st president of Guatemala from 2020 to 2024.

He is a former director of the Guatemalan penitentiary system and participated in Guatemala's presidential elections in 2007, 2011, and 2015.

He won in the 2019 election, and assumed office on 14 January 2020.

== Political career ==
Giammattei was the general coordinator of the electoral processes in 1985, 1988, and 1990. He gained recognition at both national and international level.

He has been a consultant to several companies since 2000. After losing the mayoral elections, he was appointed director of the Guatemalan Penitentiary System in 2006. He ceased to be director of the Penitentiary System in 2008. He had several conflicts and accusations about the Pavorreal case, leading to his incarceration for a short time.

Giammattei has had three appearances in the general elections for President of Guatemala. The first was in 2007, with the then-official party, the Great National Alliance (GANA), with strong participation. The second was in 2011 with the Social Action Center Party, but it was dissolved due to not reaching the minimum percentage of votes required by the TSE. In the elections of 2015, he joined the presidency with the FUERZA party.

== Presidency (2020–2024) ==
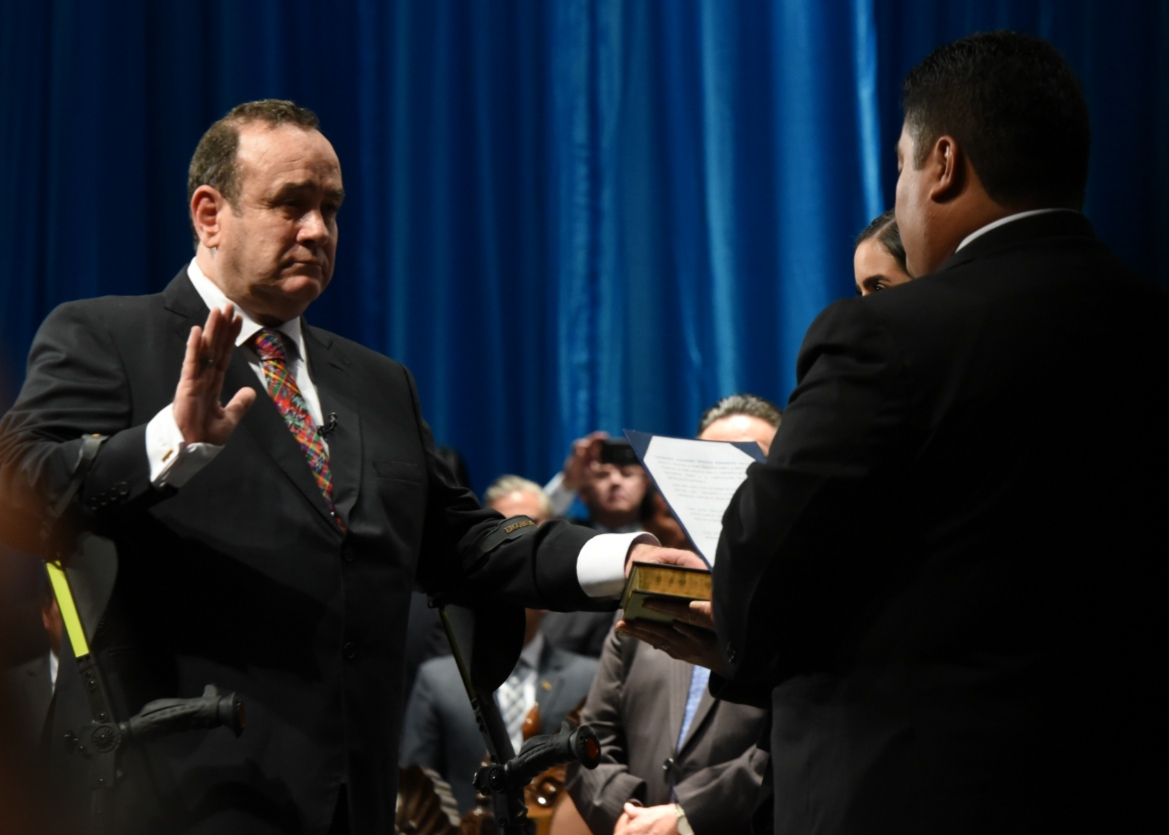
Giammattei takes the oath of office, administered by president of the congress, Allan Rodríguez, 14 January 2020

Giammattei became the presidential candidate for the Vamos party in the 2019 presidential elections. He placed second in the first round behind Sandra Torres on 16 June 2019, with 13.95% of the vote, but won the second round against the latter on 11 August 2019, with 57.96% of the vote.

On 14 January 2020, Giammattei assumed office as president of the Republic of Guatemala, succeeding Jimmy Morales.

=== Political crisis in 2020 ===
Guatemala experienced a political crisis in November 2020 following the adoption of a controversial budget. Most of the funds are earmarked for privately managed infrastructure and neglect the fight against poverty and child malnutrition, which affects nearly half of all children under five while generating an increase in public debt. Congress was set on fire following the repression of a demonstration by the police. At the same time, the Vice President, Guillermo Castillo Reyes, called on Alejandro Giammattei to resign for "the good of the country." This crisis came at a time when the government was also facing criticism for its handling of the COVID-19 pandemic, as hospitals quickly became saturated and the Ministry of Health was accused of withholding information about the pandemic.

=== Repressive measures ===
At the end of July 2022, the police arrested journalist José Rubén Zamora, founder of the daily El Periódico. They searched the newspaper's headquarters, which had accused President Alejandro Giammattei and Attorney General Consuelo Porras of corruption. In the countryside, indigenous communities defending their territories and peasant movements were repressed. Selective assassinations of social leaders (peasants, environmentalists, trade unionists) continued year after year, with no reaction from the justice system. A new law on NGOs allowed the president to ban any association they suspected of "disturbing public order" and provided mechanisms to stifle them financially.

The International Federation for Human Rights, the World Organisation Against Torture, and other NGOs warned in 2022 about the "strengthening of authoritarian rule" in Guatemala and declared that the country is "experiencing an alarming phenomenon of capture and control of public institutions by economic and political elites."

=== Legislation against abortion and homosexuality ===
In 2022, the Guatemalan congress passed a bill that would increase prison sentences for abortion, ban sex education in schools, and declare homosexuals "minority groups incompatible with Christian morality." While initially supportive, Giammattei reversed his position on the bill on 11 March 2022, announcing that he would veto the bill unless Congress pulled it back, citing that it violated two international conventions that Guatemala was a signatory to as well as the Guatemalan constitution. On 15 March, Congress indefinitely suspended consideration of the bill.

=== 2022 Huehuetenango attack ===
On 30 July 2022, while Gianmattei was visiting some places in the Huehuetenango Department, one of them not far from the Mexican border, there was an incident between security forces and armed people in a vehicle. While initial reports presumed the incident was an assassination attempt, later reports indicated that Giammattei was never at risk, neither targeted by the attack nor even close to it.

=== Suspicions of corruption ===
In July 2021, Alejandro Giammattei's Attorney General, María Consuelo Porras, dismissed the head of the Special Prosecutor's Office against Impunity, Juan Francisco Sandoval, since he intended to investigate corruption cases linked to the president. He left the country shortly afterward to 'protect [his] life and integrity.' This controversial decision was followed by demonstrations calling on the president to resign. The Attorney General subsequently stepped up her crackdown on judges, lawyers, and prosecutors linked to the fight against corruption; several former investigators of the Special Prosecutor's Office against Impunity (FECI) and the International Commission against Impunity in Guatemala (CICIG) were arrested in 2022, and others forced into exile or else continually harassed.

A link to these juridical persecutions appeared in February 2022, when the Salvadoran investigative website El Faro revealed that Giammattei was accused of "financing his [2019] campaign with bribes from a construction company." The Guatemalan president is said to have negotiated with José Luis Benito, a minister in Jimmy Morales' government, 'a contribution of $2.6 million to his electoral campaign...In exchange for this money Giammattei promised the minister...to keep him in office for a year so that he could continue to implement a multi-million dollar bribery scheme in road construction and maintenance contracts."

=== Interior ministers ===
There have been five Interior ministers in the presidency of Giammattei: Edgar Godoy, Oliverio Garcia, Gendri Reyes, Napoleón Barrientos, and Byron Bor. Except the last, they all resigned.

=== End of presidency ===
A sharp increase in violent crime and a punishingly high cost of living made Alejandro Giammattei deeply unpopular. In January 2022, halfway through his term, Giammattei had a 27% approval rating according to a CID Gallup poll, one of the lowest among the continent's presidents. In 2023, only 2.9% of respondents rated the Giammattei administration as good. Emigration to the United States increased sharply under his presidency.

== Post-presidency ==
On 17 January 2024, the U.S. State Department barred Giammattei from entering the United States, accusing him of “involvement in significant corruption” during his presidency, namely "accepting bribes in exchange for the performance of his public functions".

On 2 April 2025, the British government barred Giammattei from entering the United Kingdom and froze his assets, accusing him of "benefiting from corruption" during his mandate.

== Political views ==
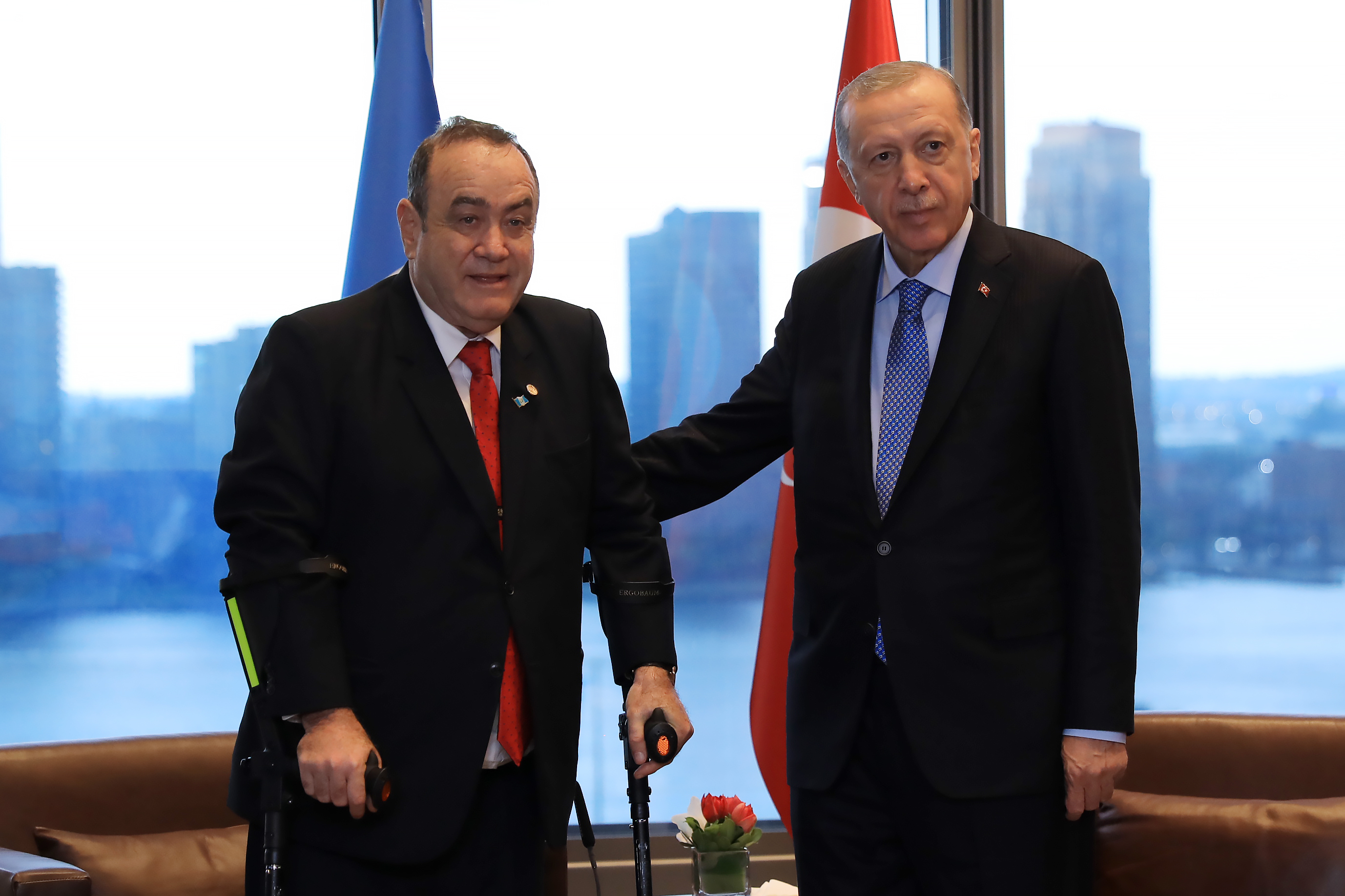
Giammattei with Turkish President Recep Tayyip Erdoğan, 19 September 2022

Giammattei vowed to bring back the death penalty and pledged to "crush violent gangs, fight poverty to stop migration and end 'disgusting' corruption." He is against same-sex marriage and abortion and supports using the military for civilian security.

During his visit to Israel in December 2019, he pledged to have Lebanese Hezbollah declared a "terrorist organization," declaring that "the friends of Israel are the friends of Guatemala, and the enemies of Israel are our enemies." A month earlier he had also pledged to align Guatemala's policy of Israeli settlements to that of the United States.

In 2019, he called the Venezuelan government a "dictatorship" and said he wanted to maintain the same diplomatic line as his predecessor, Jimmy Morales, towards Venezuela, a country with which Guatemala has severed diplomatic relations.

During the 2022 Russian invasion of Ukraine, he became the first Latin American leader to visit Ukraine since 24 February, as well as in the last 12 years. Visiting towns such as Bucha, he called on the world community to "not observe passively."

In November 2023, he expressed his unconditional support for Israel during the Gaza war.

== Personal life ==
Giammattei married Rosana Cáceres on 11 February 1989, and they have three children, including Marcela. Giammattei and Cáceres were separated by the time Giammattei launched his presidential campaign in 2019. As result of the divorce, his daughter Marcela serves as First Lady of Guatemala. He cites Mahatma Gandhi as his most admired world figure. Giammattei has multiple sclerosis and uses crutches in order to walk.

Giammattei's paternal grandfather was Italian, and Giammattei obtained Italian citizenship through jure sanguinis, in addition to his Guatemalan citizenship by birthright.

== Honors ==
- Taiwan: Order of Brilliant Jade, Grand Cordon, awarded by the President of the Republic of China Tsai Ing-wen on 20 April 2023

== Notes ==
Party political offices
New political party	Vamos nominee for President of Guatemala; 2019	Succeeded by Manuel Conde Orellana
Political offices
Preceded by Jimmy Morales	President of Guatemala; 2020–2024	Succeeded by Bernardo Arévalo
