= Nery Ramos =

Guatemalan politician

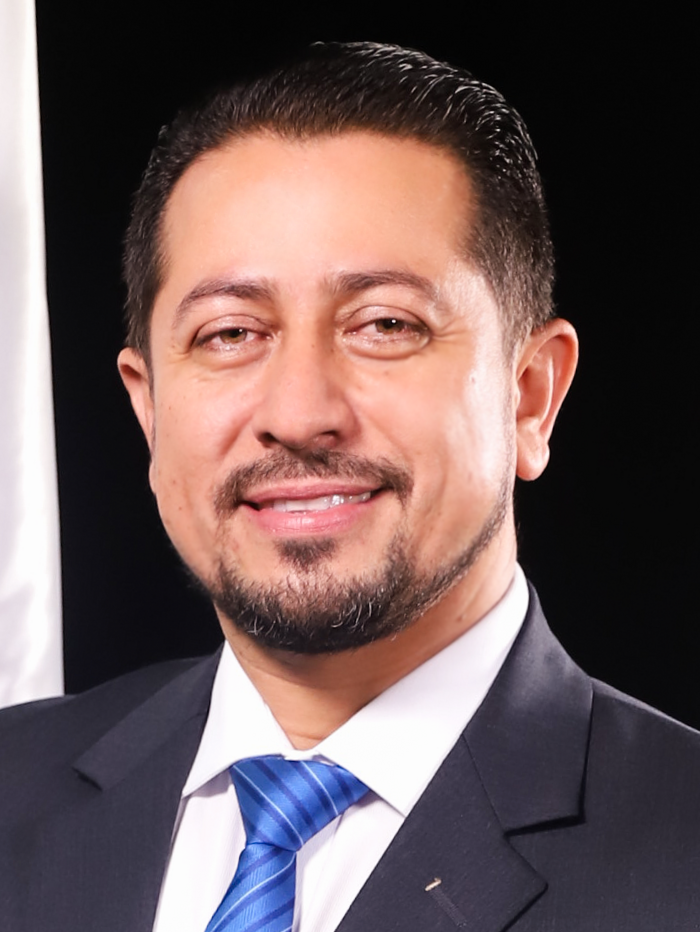
- Official portrait, 2023

President of the Congress of Guatemala
- In office 19 January 2024 – 14 January 2026
- Preceded by: Samuel Pérez Álvarez
- Succeeded by: Luis Alberto Contreras

First Vice President of the Congress
- Incumbent
- Assumed office 14 January 2026
- President: Luis Alberto Contreras
- Preceded by: Gerson Barragán

Member of the Congress of Guatemala
- Incumbent
- Assumed office 14 January 2024
- Constituency: Jutiapa

Personal details
- Born: 12 May 1979 (age 47) Jutiapa, Jutiapa
- Party: Firmes (since 2026)
- Other political affiliations: Blue Party

Nery Abilio Ramos y Ramos (locally ['neɾi a'βi.ljo 'ra.mos i 'ra.mos]; 12 May 1979) is a Guatemalan politician and former police officer who served as president of the Congress of the Republic of Guatemala from 2024 to 2026.

He was elected President of the Congress of the Republic of Guatemala on 19 January 2024, after the Constitutional Court annulled the election of Samuel Pérez Álvarez as president and disqualified the Semilla party from aspiring to positions within the leadership of Congress. Ramos is considered close to Semilla and President Bernardo Arévalo.
