= Roberto Arzú =

Guatemalan politician and businessman

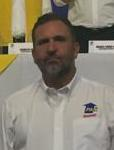
- Born: May 15, 1970 (age 56); Guatemala City
- Political party: Podemos (2019−2023); National Advancement Party (1989−2002; 2018−2020); Unionist Party (2002−2018)
- Parents: Álvaro Arzú Irigoyen (father); Silvia García-Granados (mother)

Roberto Arzú García-Granados (born 15 May 1970) is a Guatemalan politician and businessman.

== Biography ==
Arzú is the firstborn of the former President of Guatemala and mayor of Guatemala City Álvaro Arzú Irigoyen.

He is an entrepreneur whose business interests range from pharmaceuticals to restaurants and football pitches.

In the late 1990s, Arzú served as chairman of Comunicaciones F.C. leaving office in the late 2000s.

=== Political career ===
Arzú began his political career in the Youth League of the National Advancement Party.

In 2017, he was appointed Commercial Ambassador to South America by President Jimmy Morales, leaving office in 2018. He opposed the anti-corruption commission CICIG (International Commission against Impunity in Guatemala).

He ran as a presidential candidate in the 2019 elections under the National Advancement Party - founded by his father - and Podemos coalition using nationalist and populist rhetoric, using the motto "Make Guatemala Great" inspired by the campaign slogan of American President Donald Trump "Make America Great Again". Arzú obtained the fifth place in the elections with 5.3%.

He claims not to belong to any ideological current but is considered conservative. He insists in particular on security issues, proposing to bring the army to the streets, to recruit more police officers, to reinstate the death penalty and to ask for help from the United States, Israel or Taiwan in military intelligence. He promises to cut drug prices by 50% and to create one million jobs. He also opposes the legalisation of marriage for same sex couples and the right to abortion.

In 2023, he ran again for the presidency and formed an alliance with former president Alfonso Portillo (2000-2004), choosing a former lawyer as his running mate. He enjoys a high profile and support in the capital's political circles.
