= Cambio (political party) =

Change Cambio
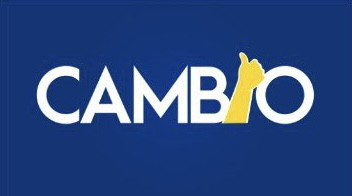
- Leader: Jorge Baldizón Vargas; Manuel Baldizón Vargas
- Founded: 2020
- Legalised: 1 July 2022
- Ideology: Populism
- Political position: Right-wing
- Colors: Yellow; Blue
- Seats in Congress: 1 / 160

Change (Spanish: Cambio) is a political party in Guatemala.

== History ==
Change was established in 2020, the leader and founder is Carlos Pineda, a businessman from Izabal. On 1 July 2022, the Supreme Electoral Tribunal legalized the political party.

Jorge Eduardo and Manuel Antonio Baldizón, sons of former presidential candidate Manuel Baldizón, are members of the political party.

Party's presumptive presidential candidate Carlos Pineda announced his resign from the party through social networks in January 2023. Days before, Pineda alleged that he would leave the political party if Manuel Baldizón directly influenced the political group.

Cambio only obtained one seat for department of Chiquimula, with the mayor of Ipala Esduin Javier Javier being elected. Despite the clear differences between the Baldizón family and the Semilla ruling party, Javier has voluntarily joined the Semilla legislative alliance.

== Electoral history ==
=== Presidential elections ===
Election	Candidates		First round		Second round		Status
Election	President	Vice President	Votes	%	Votes	%	Status
2023	Álvaro Trujillo	Miguel Ángel Ibarra	17,715	0.42 (#21)	—N/a	—N/a	Lost ✗

=== Legislative elections ===
Election	Votes	%	Seats	+/–	Status
2023	52,754	1.26	1 / 160	New	Opposition
