= Unionist Party (Guatemala) =

Unionist Party Partido Unionista
- General Secretary: Álvaro Arzú Escobar
- Founded: 2002; 24 years ago
- Preceded by: National Advancement Party
- Headquarters: 1a. Avenida 3-30 Zona 10, Guatemala City
- Youth wing: Legión Unionista
- Ideology: Conservatism; Economic liberalism Christian right
- Political position: Right-wing to far-right
- Regional affiliation: Union of Latin American Parties
- International affiliation: International Democracy Union
- Colours: Black, rainbow
- Seats in Congress: 2 / 160

Website
- www.unionistas.org

The Unionist Party (Spanish: Partido Unionista) is a conservative political party in Guatemala, who advocates the re-creation of a Central American union.

The party has been a member of the centre-right International Democracy Union since 2008 and is associated with the Union of Latin American Parties.

It is not to be confused with the party of the same name formed in 1920.

== History ==
The party originated from a split experienced by the National Advancement Party in 2000 after Álvaro Arzú lost his standing in the party, prompting him to establish the Unionist Party with old companions and functionaries during his time as president.

At the legislative elections, 9 November 2003, the party won 6.2% of the popular vote and 7 out of 158 seats. Its presidential candidate Fritz García Gallont won 3.0% at the presidential elections of the same day.

In the run-up to the elections in 2007, the party nominated Rudy Vinicio Pozuelos Alegría, who was investigated for his role in the murder of bishop Juan José Gerardi Conedera on 26 April 1998 in his function as the former head of the Presidential General Staff, for a seat in the congressional delegation from the Chimaltenango Department.

Classic logo used between 2002 until 2010

At the 2007 elections, the party again chose García Gallont as its presidential candidate. He won about 2.9% of the vote. The party won 6.2% of the national vote and 6 seats in the congressional elections.

The party was reduced to 2.7% of the nationwide vote at the elections in 2011, thereby retaining a single legislator in Congress. Their presidential candidate was Patricia Escobar, who won close to 2.2% of the electorate.

For the elections in 2015 the party entered into an alliance with Commitment, Renewal and Order. The unified list was able to garner approximately 5.7% of the vote in the congressional elections, increasing their share of seats to 5. The alliance nominated Roberto González Díaz-Durán as their presidential candidate, who gained about 3.5% in the elections.

In January 2018, in return for their support of president Jimmy Morales, General Secretary Álvaro Arzú Escobar was elected as President of the Congress.

In February 2019, Arzú Escobar was one of the most vocal opponents of the International Commission against Impunity in Guatemala (CICIG) and supported a decree terminating the agreement between the UN and Guatemala.

Logo used by the Unionist Party from 2010 to 2016

In June 2019, the leading prosecutor of the Special Prosecutor's Office against Impunity (FECI) Juan Francisco Sandoval brought charges of embezzlement and fraud against the mayor of Guatemala City, Ricardo Quiñónez Lemus. The proceedings had to be stopped in January 2021, after the CSJ determined that the prosecutorial immunity of the mayor can not be revoked. In the same month, Héctor Cifuentes was also arrested for illegal party financing, but after changes to the law in 2022, charges were dropped in October 2022 and he was released. The party was one of nine parties that rejected a four-point minimum compromise on human rights, initiated by the Human Rights Ombudsman and the Guatemalan office of the OHCHR.

The party contested the elections in 2019 on their own again and achieved 2.9% of the national vote in the legislative elections, thereby electing 3 legislators to Congress. The party contested the presidential elections with Pablo Duarte and Roberto Villeda as their ticket, falling to 1.4% of the vote.

After the election, the party was generally seen as an ally of the government faction. In October 2019, the party supported the impeachment of the Ombudsman for Human Rights, Jordán Rodas, for his alleged inaction in five different cases, in Congress. The motion failed to reach the required quorum.

On 5 August 2022, the party announced they would enter into a political alliance with Valor to contest the upcoming election in 2023 together. The agreement was officialised at the national convention of the party on 11 December 2022, where the slate of candidates for Congress and the presidential candidate duo were proclaimed. The alliance nominated Zury Ríos and Héctor Cifuentes as presidential and vice-presidential candidate, respectively.

== Ideology ==
The party's reduced popular support has not allowed it to achieve a significant number of public positions, preventing it from consolidating a defined ideology. However, due to the origins of its leaders in other political movements, it can be classified as a right-wing party on the classic political spectrum. It is a notably nationalist movement, socially conservative but at the same time promoting a free market economy.

== Electoral history ==
=== Presidential elections ===
| Election | Candidates | | First round | | Second round | | Status |
| Election | President | Vice President | Votes | % | Votes | % | Status |
|---|---|---|---|---|---|---|---|
| 2003 | Fritz García Gallont | Héctor Cifuentes | 80,943 | 3.02 | —N/a | —N/a | Lost ✗ |
| 2007 | Fritz García Gallont | Enrique Godoy García Granados | 95,280 | 2.91 | —N/a | —N/a | Lost ✗ |
| 2011 | Patricia Escobar | Álvaro Rodas | 97,498 | 2.19 | —N/a | —N/a | Lost ✗ |
| 2015 (Note: Joint ticket with CREO.) | Roberto González Díaz-Durán | Rodolfo Neutze Aguirre | 166,960 | 3.48 | —N/a | —N/a | Lost ✗ |
| 2019 | Pablo Duarte | Roberto Villeda | 62,679 | 1.43 | —N/a | —N/a | Lost ✗ |
| 2023 (Note: Joint ticket with Valor.) | Zury Ríos | Héctor Cifuentes | 365,028 | 8.69 | —N/a | —N/a | Lost ✗ |

=== Legislative elections ===
| Election | Votes | % | Seats | +/– | Status |
|---|---|---|---|---|---|
| 2003 | 157,893 | 6.19 (#5) | 7 / 158 | New | Opposition |
| 2007 | 192,295 | 6.10 (#6) | 7 / 158 | ▼1 | External support |
| 2011 | 118,309 | 2.70 (#10) | 1 / 158 | ▼5 | External support |
| 2015 (Note: In coalition with CREO.) | 261,040 | 5.73 (#7) | 5 / 158 | ▲4 | External support |
| 2019 | 118,337 | 2.94 (#15) | 3 / 160 | ▼2 | External support |
| 2023 (Note: In coalition with Valor.) | 229,861 | 5.51 (#6) | 5 / 160 | ▲1 | Opposition |
