= Allan Rodríguez =

Guatemalan politician

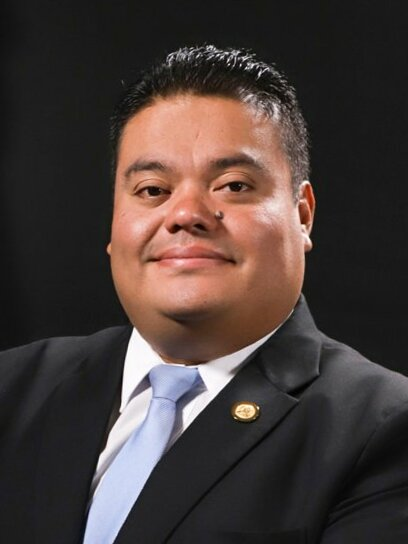
- Official portrait

President of the Congress of Guatemala
- In office 14 January 2020 – 14 January 2022
- Preceded by: Álvaro Arzú Escobar
- Succeeded by: Shirley Rivera

Member of the Congress of Guatemala
- Incumbent
- Assumed office 14 January 2020
- Constituency: Sololá

Personal details
- Born: 19 October 1981 (age 44)
- Party: Vamos
- Children: Christell Rodríguez; Adrián Rodríguez

Allan Estuardo Rodríguez Reyes (locally [ˈalan esˈtwaɾðo roˈðɾiɣes ˈreʝes]; 19 October 1981) is a Guatemalan politician from the Vamos party who was president of the Congress of the Republic of Guatemala from 2020 to 2022.

He was elected President of the Congress of the Republic of Guatemala on 14 January 2020 and swore in Alejandro Giammattei as president of Guatemala on the same day.
