= Supreme Electoral Tribunal (Guatemala) =

Agency overview
- Formed: March 23, 1983; 41 years ago
- Headquarters: Zone 2, Guatemala City
- Website: https://www.tse.org.gt/

The Supreme Electoral Tribunal (officially: Supreme Electoral Tribunal of the Republic of Guatemala) is the highest authority in electoral matters. It is an independent constitutional body of political control, and therefore it is not subordinated to any organism of the State. It is governed by the Electoral and Political Parties Law, Decree 1-85 of the National Constituent Assembly.

This institution has the power to hold the elections for the office of President of the Republic and Vice President of the Republic, for the positions of Deputies to the Congress of the Republic and the Central American Parliament (as of the general elections of 2015), which it will be every four years, and popular consultation according to article 173 of the Constitution and the Electoral Constitutional Law. It attempts to organize them properly to make the votes cast by the citizenship transparent. However, if it does not, the Congress of the Republic is authorized to do so.

The Constitution and the Electoral Law assign to the Supreme Electoral Tribunal, Registry of Citizens and others of its organs, to exercise with exclusive functional independence the electoral jurisdiction, that is, the power to administer justice in electoral matters. In addition to organizing elections and supervising the activity of political organizations, the law applies to specific cases and resolves disputes in the electoral field, acting as a second instance, when it meets the resolutions of the Citizens' Registry, which are subject to its revision, presenting an appeal for annulment.

== See also ==
- Elections in Guatemala
- Politics of Guatemala
- Government of Guatemala
