= Congress of the Republic of Guatemala =

Guatemalan national legislature

Congress of the Republic of Guatemala Congreso de la República de Guatemala
- X Legislature

Type
- Type: Unicameral

History
- Founded: 11 March 1945

Leadership
- President: Luis Contreras, CREO since 14 January 2026
- 1st Vice President: Nery Ramos, Blue since 14 January 2026
- 2nd Vice President: Elmer Palencia, Valor since 14 January 2026
- 3rd Vice President: Kevyn Escobar, Cabal since 14 January 2025
- 1st Secretary: Juan Carlos Rivera, VICTORIA since 14 January 2026

Structure
- Seats: 160 members
- Political groups: Government (25): SEMILLA (24); WINAQ-URNG (1); Others (135): VAMOS (40); UNE (27); CABAL (18); VALOR (11); VIVA (9); TODOS (6); PPN (5); VOS (4); BIEN (4); CREO (3); VICTORIA (3); UNIONISTA (2); ELEFANTE (1); Cambio (1); AZUL (1)

Elections
- Voting system: Closed-list proportional representation
- Last election: 25 June 2023
- Next election: 2027

Motto
- God, Union, Liberty

Meeting place
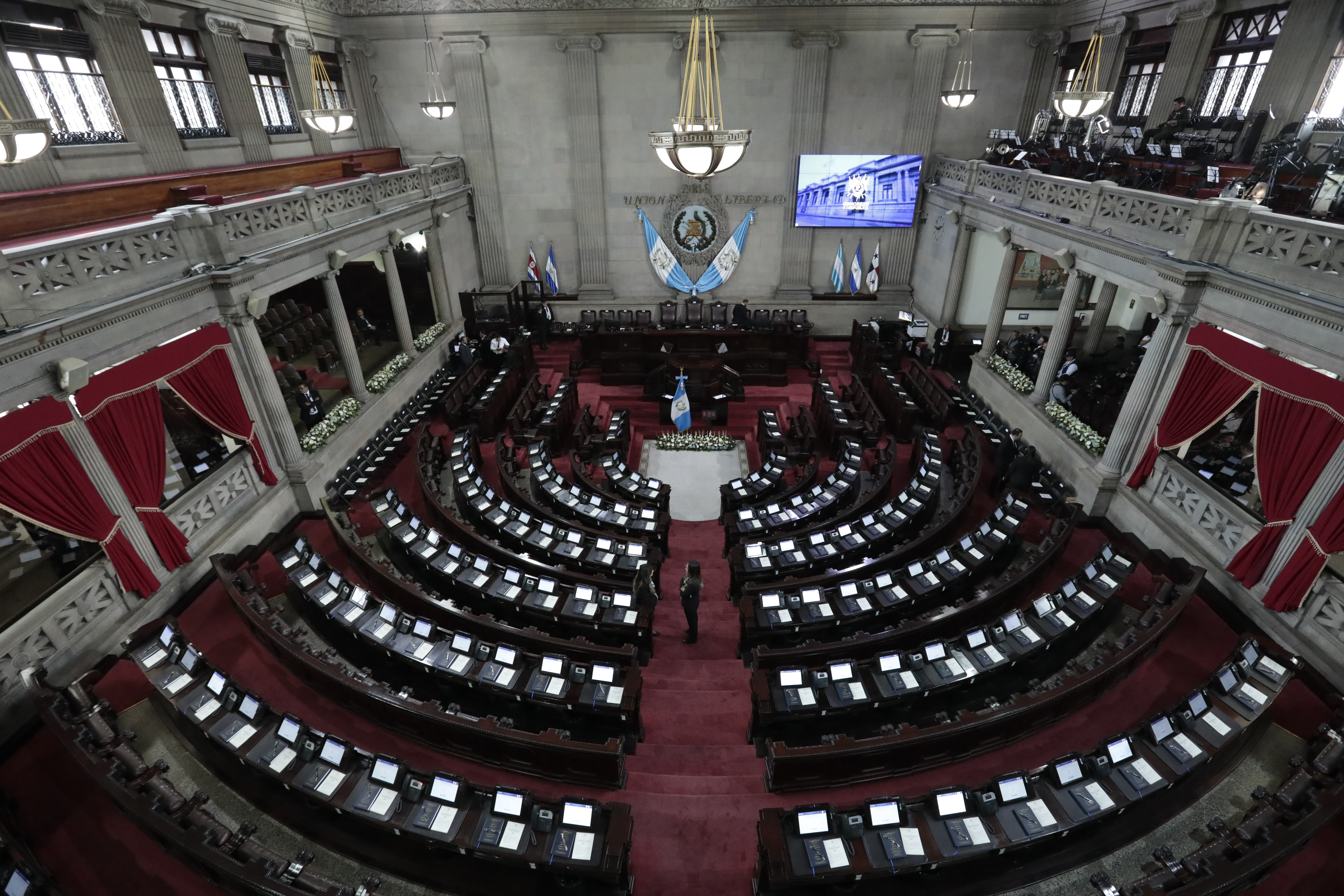
- Zone 1,Guatemala City

Website
- www.congreso.gob.gt

The Congress of the Republic (Spanish: Congreso de la República) is the unicameral legislature of the Republic of Guatemala. The Guatemalan Congress is made up of 160 deputies who are elected by direct universal suffrage to serve four-year terms. The electoral system is closed party list proportional representation. 31 of the deputies are elected on a nationwide list, whilst the remaining 127 deputies are elected in 22 multi-member constituencies. Each of Guatemala's 22 departments serves as a district, with the exception of the department of Guatemala containing the capital, which on account of its size is divided into two (distrito central and distrito Guatemala). Departments are allocated seats based on their population size and they are shown in the table below.

== Deputies by Department ==
Department	Deputies
Listado Nacional	31
Distrito Central	19
Alta Verapaz	9
Baja Verapaz	2
Chimaltenango	5
Chiquimula	3
El Progreso	1
Escuintla	6
Guatemala (Distrito)	11
Huehuetenango	10
Izabal	3
Jalapa	3
Jutiapa	4
Petén	4
Quetzaltenango	7
Quiché	8
Retalhuleu	3
Sacatepéquez	3
San Marcos	9
Santa Rosa	3
Sololá	3
Suchitepéquez	5
Totonicapán	4
Zacapa	2
Total	160

== History ==
Guatemala had a bicameral legislature in the 1845 constitution. It was replaced with the unicameral Chamber of Representatives (Spanish: Cámara de Representantes), which was in turn reformulated as the National Assembly (Spanish: Asamblea Nacional) in 1879, then the Congress of the Republic in 1945.

== Political culture ==
It is not uncommon for deputies to change parties during the legislature's term or to secede from a party and create a new party or congressional block.

== Building ==
The Congress of the Republic Guatemala is located in the Legislative Palace in Guatemala city.

During the protests against the budget for 2021 on 21 November 2020, protestors entered the building and set parts of it on fire.

== Latest election ==
Result of the legislative election.

Congreso de Guatemala (2023)
Party or alliance		National			District			Total seats	+/–
Party or alliance		Votes	%	Seats	Votes	%	Seats	Total seats	+/–
Vamos		628,126	15.06	6	696,325	15.54	33	39	+23
National Unity of Hope		538,010	12.90	5	571,867	12.76	23	28	–26
Semilla		488,692	11.72	5	430,297	9.60	18	23	+16
Cabal		371,215	8.90	3	401,035	8.95	15	18	New
Vision with Values		288,546	6.92	3	258,605	5.77	8	11	+4
Valor–Unionist	Valor–Unionist	229,861	5.51	2	124,133	2.77	3	5	New
Valor–Unionist	Valor	229,861	5.51	–	197,538	4.41	7	7	–2
Valor–Unionist	Unionist Party	229,861	5.51	–	22,363	0.50	0	0	–3
Will, Opportunity and Solidarity		186,438	4.47	1	178,750	3.99	3	4	New
Todos		169,101	4.05	1	198,893	4.44	5	6	–1
URNG–MAIZ–Winaq	URNG–MAIZ–Winaq	133,694	3.21	1	25,013	0.56	0	1	New
URNG–MAIZ–Winaq	Winaq	133,694	3.21	–	76,137	1.70	0	0	–3
URNG–MAIZ–Winaq	Guatemalan National Revolutionary Unity	133,694	3.21	–	87,687	1.96	0	0	–3
Nosotros		131,217	3.15	1	138,742	3.10	2	3	New
Victory		124,946	3.00	1	126,830	2.83	2	3	–
Bienestar Nacional		112,742	2.70	1	121,488	2.71	3	4	–4
Blue Party		98,487	2.36	1	109,802	2.45	1	2	New
Elephant Community		95,435	2.29	1	90,040	2.01	1	2	New
Podemos		86,475	2.07	0	87,011	1.94	0	0	–1
Commitment, Renewal and Order		84,667	2.03	0	102,421	2.29	3	3	–3
Movement for the Liberation of Peoples		74,802	1.79	0	81,142	1.81	0	0	–1
Humanist Party of Guatemala		61,564	1.48	0	72,059	1.61	0	0	–6
Change		52,754	1.26	0	87,821	1.96	1	1	New
National Advancement Party		45,940	1.10	0	41,594	0.93	0	0	–2
My Family		45,402	1.09	0	44,576	0.99	0	0	New
Republican Union		34,982	0.84	0	34,159	0.76	0	0	New
National Convergence Front		28,827	0.69	0	29,386	0.66	0	0	–8
Guatemalan People's Party		23,837	0.57	0	12,672	0.28	0	0	New
Republican Party		21,658	0.52	0	20,115	0.45	0	0	New
National Integration Party		13,927	0.33	0	12,416	0.28	0	0	New
Total		4,171,345	100.00	32	4,480,917	100.00	128	160	–
Source: TSE (99.13% counted, national votes) TSE

=== Central American Parliament ===
Graph of the party split among 20 seats.
Party	Votes	%	Seats	+/–
Vamos	655,906	17.75	5	+2
National Unity of Hope	594,918	16.10	4	–1
Semilla	425,629	11.52	3	+2
Vision with Values	274,193	7.42	2	+1
Valor–Unionist	256,291	6.94	2	+1
Todos	166,509	4.51	1	–
Will, Opportunity and Solidarity	155,181	4.20	1	+1
Nosotros	131,284	3.55	1	+1
Victory	120,106	3.25	1	+1
URNG–MAIZ–Winaq	118,998	3.22	0	–2
Bienestar Nacional	108,030	2.92	0	–
Elephant Community	100,932	2.73	0	–
Blue Party	95,540	2.59	0	–
Podemos	86,116	2.33	0	–
Commitment, Renewal and Order	81,892	2.22	0	–1
Humanist Party of Guatemala	70,219	1.90	0	–
Change	55,276	1.50	0	–
My Family	48,948	1.32	0	–
National Advancement Party	41,712	1.13	0	–
Republican Union	34,415	0.93	0	–
National Convergence Front	28,930	0.78	0	–2
Guatemalan People's Party	23,435	0.63	0	–
Republican Party	20,666	0.56	0	–
Total	3,695,126	100.00	20	–
Valid votes	3,695,126	65.83		
Invalid votes	1,272,521	22.67		
Blank votes	645,511	11.50		
Total votes	5,613,158	100.00		
Source: TSE (99.10% percent counted)

== See also ==
- Politics of Guatemala
- List of legislatures by country
