= María del Rosario Cristina Saborio =

First lady of Guatemala from 1871 to 1873

María del Rosario Cristina Saborio y García Granados

First Lady of Guatemala
- In role June 30, 1871 – June 4, 1873
- President: Miguel García Granados
- Preceded by: Josefa Gutiérrez Argueta
- Succeeded by: Francisca Aparicio

Personal details
- Born: María del Rosario Cristina Saborio y García Granados; 24 July 1833; Guatemala City, Guatemala
- Died: 12 October 1901 (aged 68); Guatemala City, Guatemala
- Spouse: Miguel García Granados
- Children: 9 (including Maria)

María del Rosario Cristina Saborio y García Granados (24 July 1833 – 12 October 1901) was a Guatemalan woman. She was the wife of President Miguel García Granados, First Lady of Guatemala during his government. She was daughter of José Ramón Saborio y Durán and María Josefa García Granados y Zavala. She died in 1901. She had nine children with the former President.

Honorary titles
Preceded by Josefa Gutiérrez Argueta	First Lady of Guatemala; 1871–1873	Succeeded by Francisca Aparicio
