= José Martínez de Roda =

Spanish aristocrat (1855–1899)

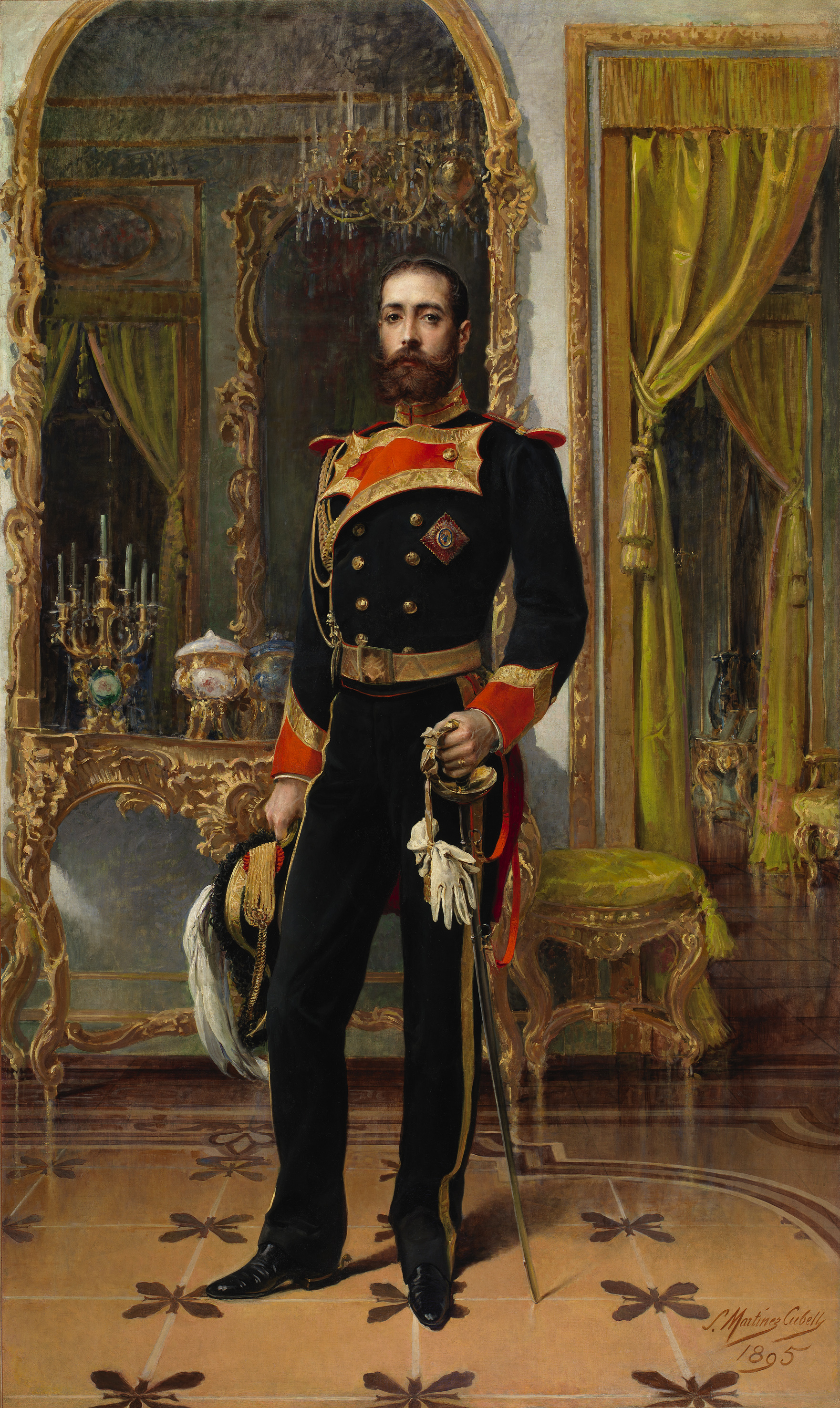
Portrait of the Spanish aristocrat José Martínez de Roda (1855-1899), who was Marquis of Vistabella and a senator of the kingdom.

José Martínez de Roda, 1st Marquis of Vistabella (October 30, 1855 – December 18, 1899) was a Spanish aristocrat, senator, and the second husband of Francisca Aparicio de Barrios, the former First Lady of Guatemala as the widow of President Justo Rufino Barrios.

== Biography ==
Roda was born on October 30, 1855, in Motril, Andalusia, Spain; his parents were Jose Maria Martínez Mantecon and Candida de Roda y Bonel. Roda served in the Spanish Congress of Deputies and married Francisca Aparicio on April 21, 1892, in Manhattan, New York. The couple frequently traveled around Europe throughout their short marriage, with a portrait of Roda even being painted by Salvador Martínez Cubells in 1895. Roda served as a senator for the provinces of Granada and Tarragona on several occasions from the year 1893 until his eventual death. Roda was a Commander of the Order of Isabella the Catholic and a Knight of the “Royal Cavalry Armoury of Ronda”. Roda died in Paris on December 18, 1899, being buried in the Cementerio de San Justo in Madrid.

== See also ==
- History of Guatemala
- Spanish nobility
