= Álida España =

Guatemalan activist and politician

First Lady of Guatemala
- In role July 1, 1970 – July 1, 1974
- President: Carlos Manuel Arana Osorio
- Preceded by: Sara de la Hoz
- Succeeded by: Hellen Lossi

Personal details
- Born: Álida España; 12 April 1924; Guatemala City, Guatemala
- Died: 8 April 1993 (aged 68); Guatemala City, Guatemala
- Spouse: Carlos Manuel Arana Osorio

Álida España (12 April 1924 – 8 April 1993) was a Guatemalan activist and politician. She was the wife of President Carlos Manuel Arana Osorio, First Lady of Guatemala during his government.

During her husband's government, she played a leading role in social work, favoring children and creating the Board of Social Works of the President's Wife, which helped the most vulnerable.

She died in 1993 at the age of 68. Different institutions are named after her.

Honorary titles
Preceded by Sara de la Hoz	First Lady of Guatemala; 1970–1974	Succeeded by Hellen Lossi
Preceded by Sara de la Hoz	Board of Social Work of the President's Wife; 1974–1978	Succeeded by Hellen Lossi
