= Desideria Ocampo =

First lady of guatemala

Desideria Ocampo Arriola

First Lady of Guatemala
- In role February 8, 1898 – April 9, 1910
- President: Manuel Estrada Cabrera
- Preceded by: Algeria Benton
- Succeeded by: Mercedes Llerandi

Personal details
- Born: Desideria Ocampo Arriola; 1861; Quetzaltenango, Guatemala
- Died: April 9, 1910 (aged 49); Nice, France
- Spouse: Manuel Estrada Cabrera
- Children: 2

Desideria Ocampo Arriola (1861 – April 9, 1910) was the wife of President Manuel Estrada Cabrera, and served as First Lady of Guatemala during his presidency. She was daughter of Gabriel Ocampo and María Encarnación Arriola She died in France in April 1910. She had two children with the President Estrada Cabrera.

Honorary titles
Preceded by Algeria Benton	First Lady of Guatemala; 1898–1910	Succeeded by Mercedes Llerandi
