= Disa (name) =

- Gender: Female

Disa is a female given name and also a surname. It may be a short form of Hjördis and other names ending in -dis, or a variant of Desideria.

== People ==
- Disa, heroine in Swedish folklore
- Disa Eythorsdottir (born 1965), American bridge player
- Mike Disa (born 1965), American animator and film director
- Stokkseyrar-Dísa (1668–1728), Icelandic magician

== See also ==
- Disa (disambiguation)
- Hjördís
