= Desideria =

Desideria may refer to:

== People ==
- Queen Desideria of Sweden and Norway, formerly Désirée Clary (1777–1860)
- Desideria Quintanar de Yáñez (1814–1893), the first woman baptized into The Church of Jesus Christ of Latter-day Saints in Mexico
- Desideria Ocampo Arriola (1861–1910), first lady of Guatemala
- "La Desideria", nickname of Chilean actress Ana González Olea (1915–2008)

== Other ==
- Desideria e l'Anello del Drago, also known as The Dragon Ring, an Italian mini-series
- Jocara desideria, a species of moth
- Solms-laubachia himalayensis, also known as Desideria himalayensis, a flowering plant
