= Disa (disambiguation) =

Disa is a heroine of Swedish mythology.

Disa or DISA may also refer to:

== Businesses ==
- Disa Records, a Mexican record label, part of Univision Music Group
- DISA motorcycles, produced in Hareskovby, Denmark during the 1950s by Jørgen Skafte Rasmussen
- DISA (company) (Dansk Industri Syndikat A/S), a Danish company that produced the Madsen machine gun

== Organisations ==
- Data Interchange Standards Association
- Defense Information Systems Agency, a United States Department of Defense combat support agency
- Directorate of Information and Security of Angola (Direção de Informação e Segurança de Angola), a secret police force

== Other uses ==
- 1319 Disa, an asteroid
- Direct Inward Systems Access, a feature of various private branch exchange (PBX) systems
- Disa language, a minor Bongo–Bagirmi language of Chad
- Disa (name), a female name
- Disa Park, a building development in Cape Town, South Africa
- Barbodes disa, a fish of family Cyprinidae
- Disa (plant), named after the Swedish Disa by Carl Peter Thunberg
- Order of the Disa, an honor issued by Western Cape Province, South Africa
