= María del Carmen Carrasco =

María del Carmen Carrasco y Llorente

First Lady of Guatemala
- In role 31 March 1963 – 1 July 1966
- President: Enrique Peralta Azurdia
- Preceded by: María Teresa Laparra
- Succeeded by: Sara de la Hoz

Personal details
- Born: María del Carmen Carrasco y Llorente; Guatemala
- Died: Guatemala
- Spouse: Enrique Peralta Azurdia

María del Carmen Carrasco y Llorente was a Guatemalan woman, wife of the Head of Government Enrique Peralta Azurdia. She served as First Lady of Guatemala during the term of her husband. She was known to be one of the first wives of a president to have received a special pension after the death of her husband.

Honorary titles
Preceded by María Teresa Laparra	First Lady of Guatemala; 1963–1966	Succeeded by Sara de la Hoz
