= Guatemala–Ukraine relations =

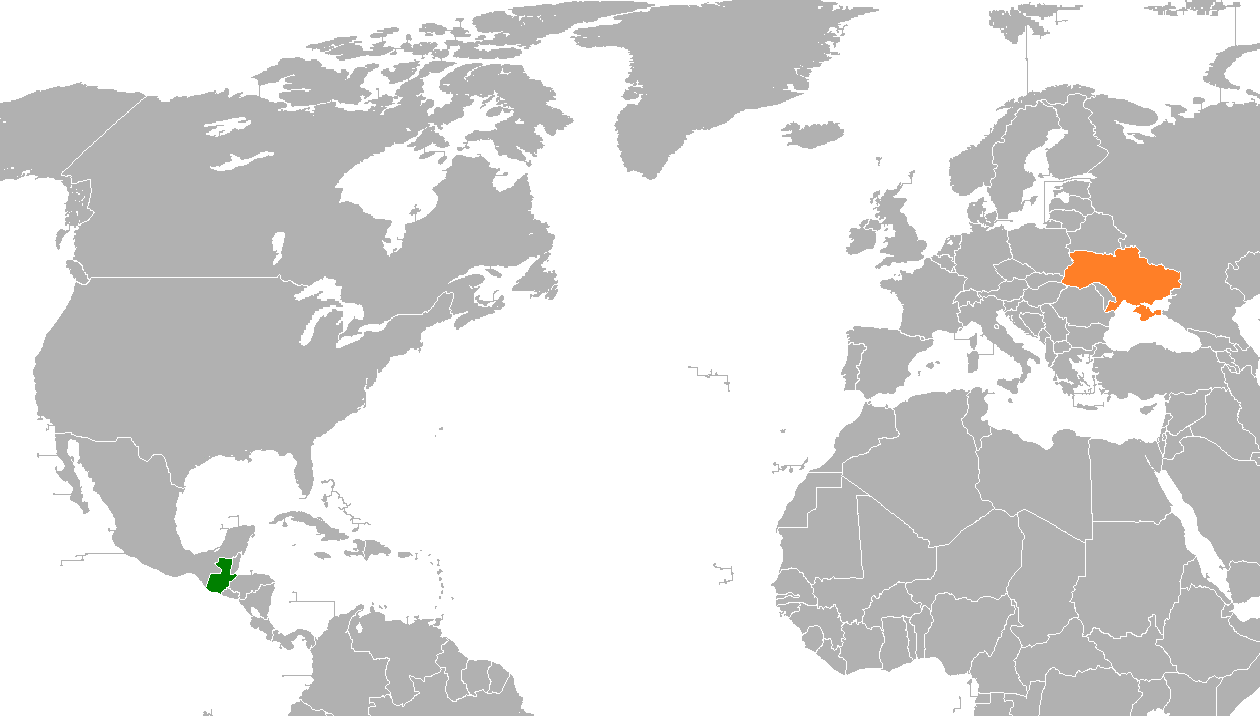
- Guatemala: Ukraine

Diplomatic mission
- Embassy of Guatemala, Warsaw: Embassy of Ukraine, Mexico City

Guatemala–Ukraine relations are the bilateral relations between Guatemala and Ukraine.

== Diplomatic missions ==
Guatemala and Ukraine established diplomatic relations on 12 January 1993. The Guatemalan embassy in Poland is concurrently accredited to Ukraine, while the Ukrainian embassy in Mexico is concurrently accredited to Guatemala.

== History ==
In October 2020, the president of Ukraine, Volodymyr Zelenskyy, appointed Oksana Dramaretska as resident ambassador to Mexico, and concurrently accredited to Guatemala, Costa Rica, Panama, and Belize.

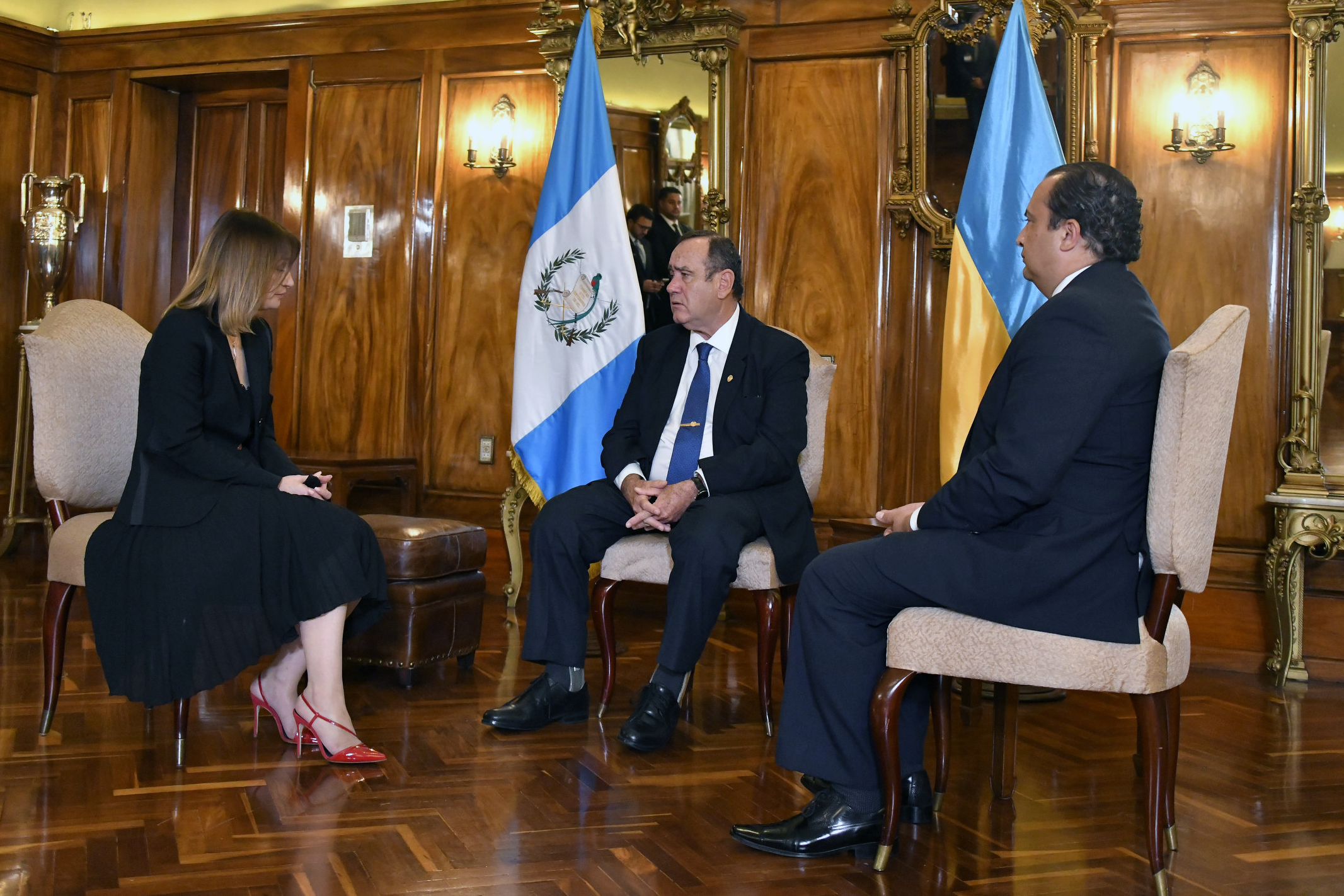
Oksana Dramaretska presents her credentials to the President of Guatemala, Alejandro Giammattei, May 2022.

On 2 February 2022, the Minister of Foreign Affairs of Guatemala, Mario Búcaro Flores A call to his Ukrainian counterpart, Dmytro Kuleba; both diplomats pledged to expand diplomatic relations between their countries. Búcaro extended an invitation to Kuleba to visit Guatemala, while Kuleba also invited Búcaro to visit Ukraine.

Days later, the president of Russia, Vladimir Putin recognized the Donetsk People's Republic and the Lugansk People's Republic as independent states; The Guatemalan government expressed its rejection of the Russian government's decision and withdrew its ambassador to Russia in protest.

Following the 2022 Russian invasion of Ukraine, Guatemala condemned the actions of the Russian government, expressed its support for Ukraine, and voted in favor of United Nations General Assembly Resolution ES-11/1.

On 3 March 2022, Ambassador Dramaretska presented her credentials virtually to Foreign Minister Mario Búcaro.

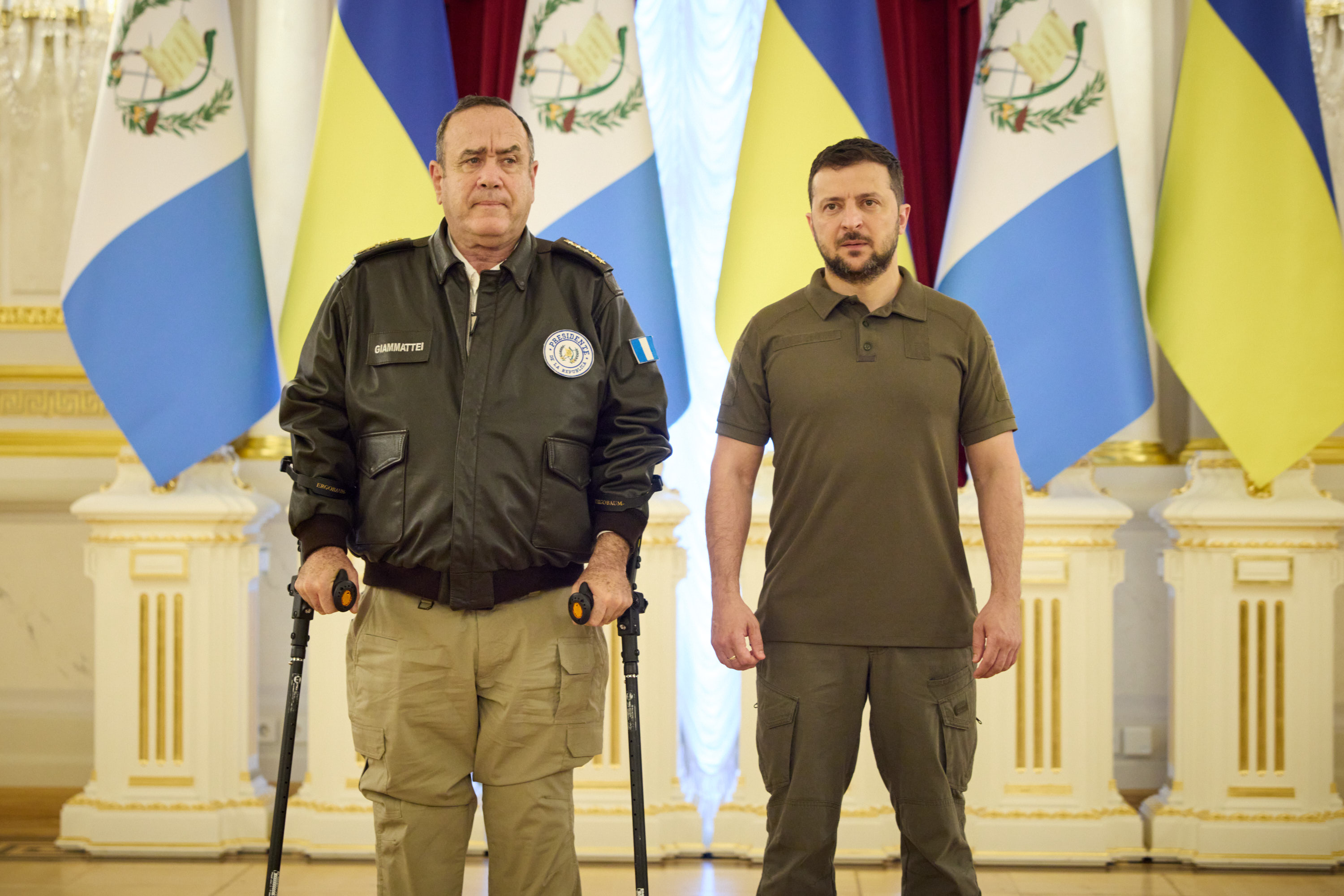
The President of Ukraine with his Guatemalan counterpart at the Mariinskyi Palace.

On 12 March 2022, Guatemala welcomed the first families Ukrainians who escaped the invasion. The Guatemalan government announced it will receive Ukrainian refugees.

In March 2022, a group of opposition members of parliament—Andrea Villagrán, Evelyn Morataya, Sonia Gutiérrez Raguay, Édgar Batres, Ligia Hernández, Bernardo Arévalo, and Walter Félix presented a legislative proposal seeking to urge President Alejandro Giammattei to take action against Russia for its invasion of Ukraine. The proposal included the cancellation of the contract for the acquisition of the Sputnik V vaccines with the Russian government was requested. That same day, President Alejandro Giammattei announced that his government was studying the possibility of "suspending" the vacunas Sputnik V vaccine contract signed between Guatemala and Russia. One day later, on March 17; President Zelenskyy thanked Guatemala for its support of Ukraine via his Twitter account.

In May 2022, Ambassador Oksana Dramarétska officially presented her credentials to President Alejandro Giammattei and Foreign Minister Mario Búcaro; Later, the ambassador gave a speech at the Congress of the Republic of Guatemala.

On 13 June 2022, it was reported that President Volodymyr Zelenskyy and Giammattei held a telephone call, marking the first contact between the heads of state of Ukraine and Guatemala. Zelenskyy thanked Guatemala for its diplomatic support in the context of the Russian invasion of Ukraine and extended an invitation for Giammattei to visit Ukraine. They discussed the elimination of visa requirements between the two states as a sign of good faith, as well as Guatemala's support for the establishment of a special international tribunal to judge possible war crimes and the formation of a task force for the reconstruction of the country. President Giammattei announced that the Russian army bombed the honorary consulate of Guatemala in Ukraine, resulting in the deaths of some relatives of the Guatemalan consul.

On 25 July 2022, President Alejandro Giammattei visited Ukraine, accompanied by Foreign Minister Mario Búcaro Flores and Minister Minister of National Defense Henry Reyes Chigua, marking the first official visit of a Latin American head of state to Ukraine in 12 years, the first visit of a Guatemalan head of state to Ukraine, and the first meeting between the heads of state of Guatemala and Ukraine. Giammattei toured the cities of Bucha and Irpin, later he was received by the Ukrainian president Volodymyr Zelenskyy at the Mariinskyi Palace. Foreign Minister Mario Búcaro and Defense Minister Henry Reyes also held a meeting with their Ukrainian counterparts, Dmytro Kuleba and Oleksii Reznikov, respectively. President Giammattei was also received by the prime minister of Ukraine, Denys Shmyhal.

Giammattei and Zelenskyy signed an agreement for the mutual abolition of visa requirements, and also expressed their interest in expanding cooperation between the two countries in agriculture, education, science, culture, technology, tourism, student and intern exchanges, and the implementation of joint scientific projects, as well as establishing labor relations and expanding political and economic relations. Giammattei indicated that Guatemala is interested in importing Ukrainian agricultural products and announced that they will send humanitarian aid to Ukraine. Guatemala also participated virtually in the 2022 Crimean Platform.

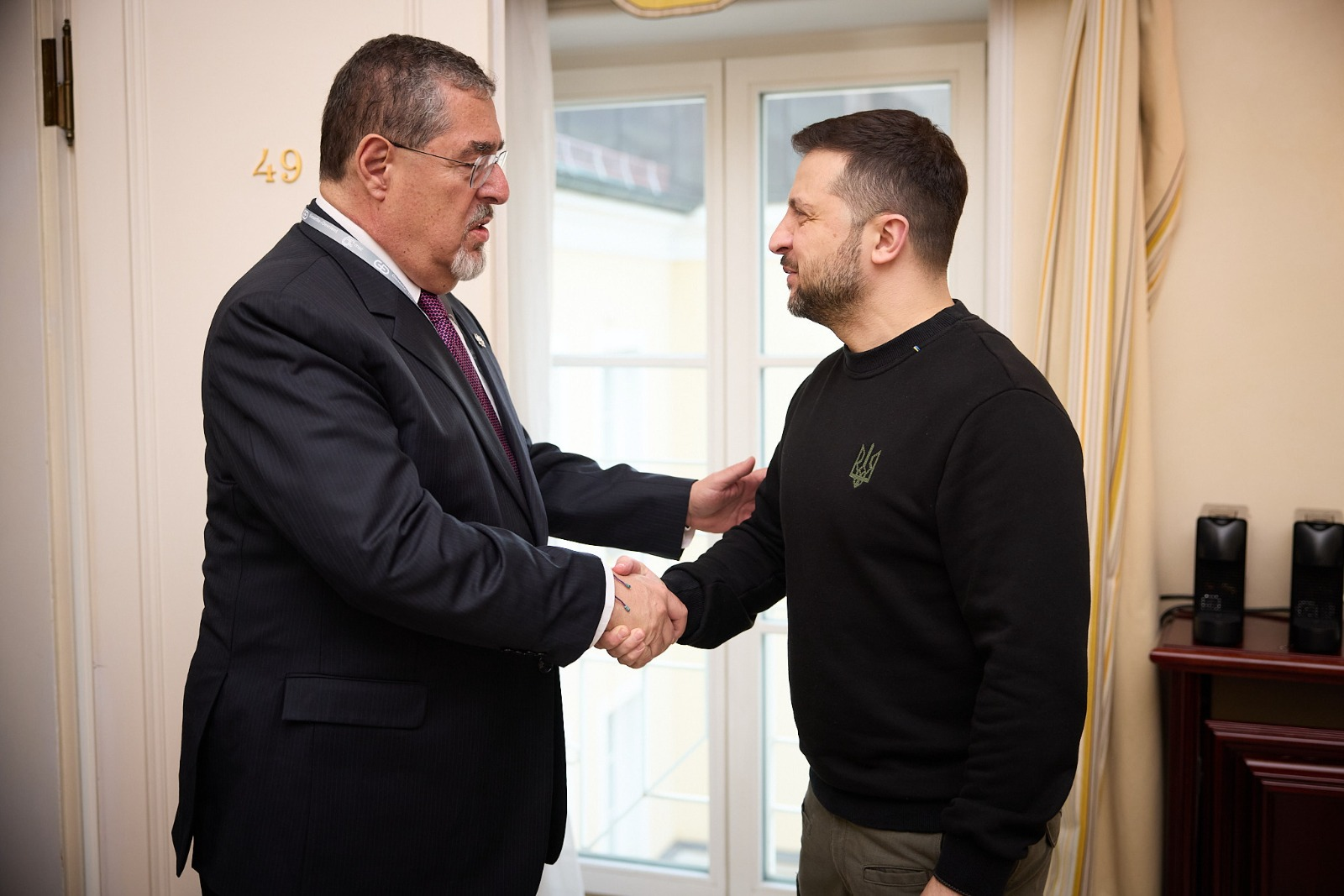
Guatemalan President Arévalo greets Ukrainian President Zelensky in Munich, February 2024.

Prior to Giammattei's visit, the Guatemalan ambassador to Germany and concurrently accredited to Ukraine, Jorge Alfredo Lemcke Arévalo, presented his credentials to President Zelenskyy. The Guatemalan government urged Zelenskyy to visit Guatemala once the war is over.

On 10 May 2023, Ukrainian foreign minister Dmytro Kuleba arrived in Guatemala City to participate in the IX Summit of the Association of Caribbean States in Antigua Guatemala as an observer state. This is the first visit by a high-ranking Ukrainian official to Guatemala.

On 17 February 2024, within the framework of the 60th Munich Security Conference, Guatemalan president Bernardo Arévalo met with President Zelenskyy, who thanked Guatemala for its support and invited Arévalo to participate in the first Global Peace Summit at the level of heads of state, held in Switzerland. Arévalo was ultimately unable to attend due to internal issues, but sent Foreign Minister Carlos Ramiro Martínez in his place. In April of the same year, the High Representative of the European Union for Foreign Affairs and Security Policy announced that Ukraine had joined the sanctions against four officials of the Guatemalan Public Prosecutor's Office (including the attorney general María Consuelo Porras) and a judge for their controversial role during the 2023 general elections.

In September of the same year, First Lady Lucrecia Peinado traveled to Ukraine to participate in the 4th Summit of First Ladies and Gentlemen, and later met with her Ukrainian counterpart, Olena Zelenska. It was Peinado's first official solo trip as First Lady.

== State visits ==
=== Guatemala ===
- President Alejandro Giammattei (2022)
  - Minister of Foreign Affairs Mario Búcaro
  - Minister of National Defense Henry Reyes
- First Lady Lucrecia Peinado (2024)

=== Ukraine ===
- Minister of Foreign Affairs Dmytro Kuleba (2023)

== Resident diplomatic missions ==
- Guatemala is accredited to Ukraine from its embassy in Warsaw, Poland.
- Ukraine is accredited to Guatemala from its embassy in Mexico City, Mexico.

== See also ==
- Foreign relations of Guatemala
- Foreign relations of Ukraine
