= Raquel Blandón =

Guatemalan lawyer and activist (1943–2024)

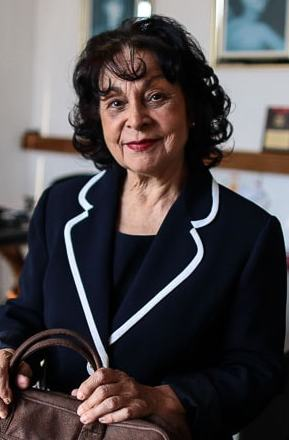
- Blandón in 2017

First Lady of Guatemala
- In role January 14, 1986 – January 14, 1991
- President: Vinicio Cerezo
- Preceded by: Aura Rosario Rosal López
- Succeeded by: Magda Bianchi Lázzari

Personal details
- Born: May 10, 1943 Jalapa, Guatemala
- Died: September 21, 2024 (aged 81) Guatemala City, Guatemala
- Party: Guatemalan Christian Democracy
- Spouse: Vinicio Cerezo (m. 1965; div. 2006)
- Education: Universidad de San Carlos de Guatemala

Haydee Raquel Blandón Sandoval (Spanish pronunciation: [raˈkel blanˈdon]; May 10, 1943 – September 21, 2024) was a Guatemalan lawyer, activist, and political leader who served as the first lady of Guatemala from 1986 to 1991, as the wife of President Vinicio Cerezo. She was the nominee for the Renewed Democratic Liberty party for vice president of Guatemala in the 2011 election as Manuel Baldizón's running mate .

Blandón died of sepsis in Guatemala City on September 21, 2024, at the age of 81.

Honorary titles
Preceded by Aura Rosario Rosal López (acting)	First Lady of Guatemala; 1986–1991	Succeeded by Magda Bianchi Lázzari
Preceded by Aura Rosario Rosal López (acting)	Board of Social Work of the President's Wife; 1986–1991	Succeeded by Magda Bianchi Lázzari
Party political offices
Preceded by Vinicio Cerezo	Guatemalan Christian Democracy nominee for President of Guatemala; Retired; 1990	Succeeded by Luis Alfonso Cabrera Hidalgo
Preceded by None	Green nominee for Vice President of Guatemala; 1999	Succeeded by None
Preceded by None	Renewed Democratic Liberty nominee for Vice President of Guatemala; 2011	Succeeded by Édgar Barquín
