= Ranunculus trivedii =

Scientific classification
- Kingdom: Plantae
- Clade: Tracheophytes
- Clade: Angiosperms
- Clade: Eudicots
- Order: Ranunculales
- Family: Ranunculaceae
- Genus: Ranunculus
- Species: R. trivedii

Binomial name
- Ranunculus trivedii Aswal & Mehrotra

Species of plant

Ranunculus trivedii is a species of flowering plant in the buttercup family Ranunculaceae. It is one of the highest altitude flowering plants in the world.

== Description ==
Ranunculus trivedii grows as a perennial herb. The coriaceous leaves measure up to 2.5 cm (1 in) in diameter. It bears solitary yellow flowers. The plant flowers and fruits from June to August.

== Distribution and habitat ==
Ranunculus trivedii grows naturally in Himalayan India, Pakistan, Nepal, Bhutan and Tibet. Along with Solms-laubachia himalayensis, it is the highest altitude flowering plant on record. In 1955, specimens were discovered at 6,400 m (21,000 ft) by Narendra Dhar Jayal on an expedition to Kamet mountain in present-day Uttarakhand.
