= María Teresa Sosa =

Guatemalan politician (1930–2018)

First Lady of Guatemala
- In role 23 March 1982 – 8 August 1983
- President: Efraín Ríos Montt
- Preceded by: Elsa Cirigliano
- Succeeded by: Aura Rosario Rosal López

Personal details
- Born: María Teresa Sosa Ávila; 12 July 1930 Chimaltenango, Guatemala
- Died: 1 October 2018 (aged 88) Guatemala City, Guatemala
- Party: FRG (1990–2013)
- Spouse: Efraín Ríos Montt (m. 1953; died 2018)
- Children: 3 (including Zury Ríos)

María Teresa Sosa Ávila (12 July 1930 – 1 October 2018) was a Guatemalan politician. She was the widow of President of Guatemala Efraín Ríos Montt and mother of Zury Ríos. She was the nominee for the Guatemalan Republican Front for the presidency in the election of 1995. However, the Citizen Registry annulled her candidacy because she could not be elected to the position under the express prohibition contained in Article 186, Subsection C of the Constitution. She was succeeded as her party's nominee by Alfonso Portillo, who subsequently won the 1999 election.

Sosa died at home in Guatemala City on 1 October 2018 due to natural causes, six months after the death of her husband. She was 88.

Honorary titles
Preceded by Elsa Cirigliano	First Lady of Guatemala; 1982–1983	Succeeded by Aura Rosario Rosal López
Preceded by Elsa Cirigliano	Board of Social Work of the President's Wife; 1982–1983	Succeeded by Aura Rosario Rosal López
Party political offices
Preceded by None	Guatemalan Republican Front nominee for President of Guatemala; Retired; 1995	Succeeded by Alfonso Portillo
