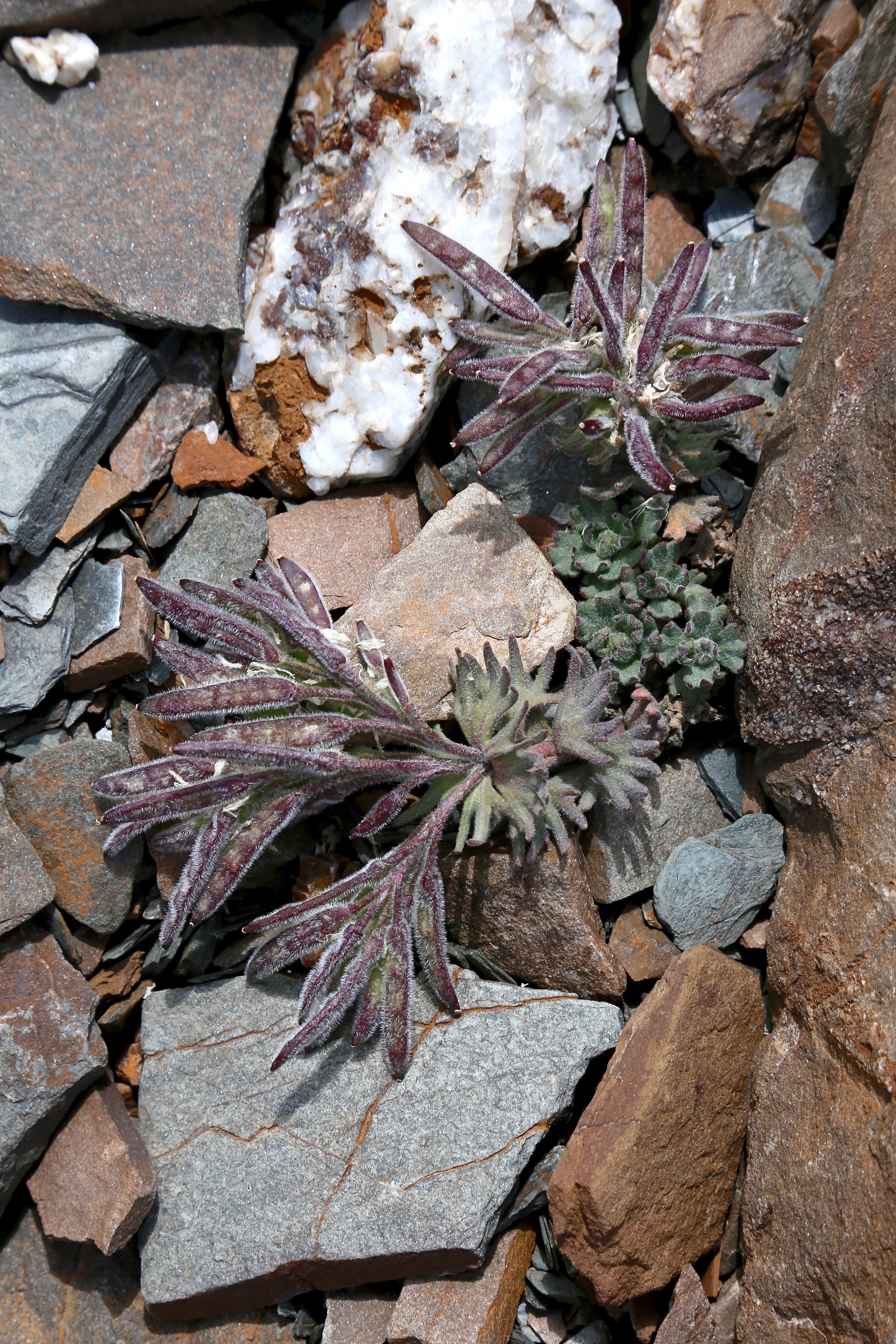
- Solms-laubachia flabellata (syn. Oreoblastus flabellatus) near Bedel Pass, Kyrgyzstan

Scientific classification
- Kingdom: Plantae
- Clade: Tracheophytes
- Clade: Angiosperms
- Clade: Eudicots
- Clade: Rosids
- Order: Brassicales
- Family: Brassicaceae
- Genus: Solms-laubachia; Muschl.

Species
- See text

Synonyms
- Desideria Pamp.; Ermaniopsis H.Hara; Eurycarpus Botsch.; Oreoblastus Suslova; Parryopsis Botsch.; Phaeonychium O.E.Schulz; Vvedenskyella Botsch.; Wakilia Gilli

= Solms-laubachia =

Genus of herbs

Solms-laubachia is a high-elevation genus of perennial herbs in the family Brassicaceae. It is named for the German botanist Hermann zu Solms-Laubach.

== Taxonomy ==
In 2008, Yue et al. expanded Solms-laubachia, using molecular phylogenetics, to incorporate all Desideria species and one other species, Phaeonychium jafrii. They also described four new species.

== Distribution and habitat ==
Solms-laubachia species grow naturally in the Himalayan, Karakoram, Pamir and Hengduan mountains or, regionally, in an arc from Kyrgyzstan in the northwest to southeastern Tibet. Their habitat is scree slopes and rock crevices from 4,000 m (13,000 ft) to 6,200 m (20,000 ft) elevation.

== Species ==
34 species are accepted.

- Solms-laubachia albiflora (T.Anderson) D.A.German & Al-Shehbaz
- Solms-laubachia angustifolia J.P.Yue, Al-Shehbaz & H.Sun
- Solms-laubachia baiogoinensis (K.C.Kuan & C.H.An) J.P.Yue, Al-Shehbaz & H.Sun
- Solms-laubachia calcicola J.P.Yue, Al-Shehbaz & H.Sun
- Solms-laubachia eurycarpa (Maxim.) Botsch.
- Solms-laubachia flabellata (Regel) J.P.Yue, Al-Shehbaz & H.Sun
- Solms-laubachia grandiflora J.P.Yue, Al-Shehbaz & H. Sun
- Solms-laubachia haranensis (Al-Shehbaz) J.P.Yue, Al-Shehbaz & H.Sun
- Solms-laubachia himalayensis (Cambess.) J.P.Yue, Al-Shehbaz & H.Sun
- Solms-laubachia incana (Ovcz.) J.P.Yue, Al-Shehbaz & H.Sun
- Solms-laubachia jafrii (Al-Shehbaz) J.P.Yue, Al-Shehbaz & H.Sun
- Solms-laubachia kashgarica (Botsch.) D.A.German & Al-Shehbaz
- Solms-laubachia lanata Botsch.
- Solms-laubachia lanuginosa (Hook.f. & Thomson) D.A.German & Al-Shehbaz
- Solms-laubachia linearifolia (W.W.Sm.) O.E.Schulz
- Solms-laubachia linearis (N.Busch) J.P.Yue, Al-Shehbaz & H.Sun
- Solms-laubachia marinellii (Pamp.) D.A.German & Al-Shehbaz
- Solms-laubachia mieheorum (Al-Shehbaz) J.P.Yue, Al-Shehbaz & H.Sun
- Solms-laubachia minor Hand.-Mazz.
- Solms-laubachia mirabilis (Pamp.) J.P.Yue, Al-Shehbaz & H.Sun
- Solms-laubachia nepalensis (H.Hara) J.P.Yue, Al-Shehbaz & H.Sun
- Solms-laubachia parryoides (Kurz ex Hook.f. & T.Anderson) D.A.German & Al-Shehbaz
- Solms-laubachia platycarpa (Hook.f. & Thomson) Botsch.
- Solms-laubachia prolifera (Maxim.) J.P.Yue, Al-Shehbaz & H.Sun
- Solms-laubachia pulcherrima Muschl.
- Solms-laubachia pumila (Kurz) F.Dvořák
- Solms-laubachia retropilosa Botsch.
- Solms-laubachia stewartii (T.Anderson) J.P.Yue, Al-Shehbaz & H.Sun
- Solms-laubachia sunhangiana J.P.Yue & Al-Shehbaz
- Solms-laubachia surculosa (N.Busch) D.A.German & Al-Shehbaz
- Solms-laubachia tianbaoshanensis H.L.Chen, Al-Shehbaz, J.P.Yue & H.Sun
- Solms-laubachia villosa (Maxim.) D.A.German & Al-Shehbaz
- Solms-laubachia xerophyta (W.W.Sm.) H.F.Comber
- Solms-laubachia zhongdianensis J.P.Yue, Al-Shehbaz & H.Sun
