= Magda Bianchi Lázzari =

Guatemalan politician

First Lady of Guatemala
- In role January 14, 1991 – June 1, 1993
- President: Jorge Serrano Elías
- Preceded by: Raquel Blandón
- Succeeded by: María Eugenia Morales

Personal details
- Born: Magda Bianchi Lázzari; 7 October 1949 (age 75); Guatemala City, Guatemala
- Spouse: Jorge Serrano Elías

Magda Bianchi Lázzari is a Guatemalan diplomat and activist who served as the first lady of Guatemala from 1991 until 1993, as the wife of President Jorge Serrano Elías.

Bianchi followed up on the activities initiated by her predecessor, Raquel Blandón. Bianchi is an activist focused on women's rights, children and the elderly, and issues affecting people with disabilities in Guatemala. She accompanied President Serrano Elías on many of his state visits.

After President Serrano dissolved the Congress and initiated the "Serranazo", the Constitutional Court declared the President's decisions null and void and declared Vice President Gustavo Espina as illegitimate to succeed Serrano. Serrano and his wife went into exile in Panama, where they currently reside.

Honorary titles
Preceded by Raquel Blandón	First Lady of Guatemala; 1991–1993	Succeeded by María Eugenia Morales
Preceded by Raquel Blandón	Board of Social Work of the President's Wife; 1991–1992	Position abolished
Preceded by Position established	President of the Secretary of Social Work of the President's Wife; 1992–1993	Succeeded by María Eugenia Morales
