= María Teresa Laparra =

First Lady of Guatemala
- In role March 2, 1958 – March 31, 1963
- President: Miguel Ydígoras Fuentes
- Preceded by: Virginia Ruiz
- Succeeded by: María del Carmen Carrasco

Personal details
- Born: María Teresa Laparra Samayoa; 25 December 1901 Guatemala City, Guatemala
- Died: 30 September 1988 (aged 86) Guatemala City, Guatemala
- Spouse: Miguel Ydígoras Fuentes
- Children: 1

María Teresa Laparra Samayoa (25 December 1901 – 30 September 1988) was a Guatemalan activist who served as First Lady of Guatemala from March 2, 1958 until March 31,1963 as the wife of President Miguel Ydígoras Fuentes.

María Teresa Laparra de Ydígoras was the daughter of Brígido Laparra and María Samayoa. She assumed the position of First Lady when her husband won the 1958 presidential election, and she left together with her husband after the coup d'état.

Laparra died on September 30, 1988 at the age of 86.

Honorary titles
Preceded by Virginia Ruiz	First Lady of Guatemala; 1958–1963	Succeeded by María del Carmen Carrasco
