= Wendy de Berger =

Guatemalan psychologist who served as First Lady of Guatemala

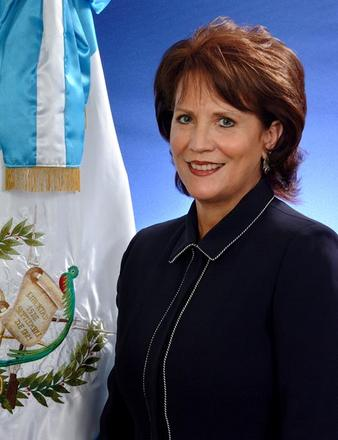

First Lady of Guatemala
- In role 14 January 2004 – 14 January 2008
- Preceded by: Evelyn Morataya
- Succeeded by: Sandra Torres

Personal details
- Born: August 11, 1946 (age 80) Guatemala City
- Party: Grand National Alliance
- Spouse: Óscar Berger
- Education: University of San Carlos
- Occupation: Psychologist

Margarita Wendy Widmann Lagarde de Berger (born 11 August 1946) is a Guatemalan psychologist who served as the first lady of Guatemala from 2004 to 2008 as the wife of President Óscar Berger. She studied sociology at Trinity Washington University in Washington, D.C.

== Biography ==
Wendy de Berger was born on 11 August 1946 in Guatemala City, Guatemala Department, the fifth of six children born to Walter Widmann and Carlota Lagarde. She completed her primary and secondary studies at Colegio Monte María. In 1967, she married Óscar Berger and had five children: Oscar, Denise, Juan Esteban, Francisco, and Wendy Berger Widmann. Her interest in the humanities led her to study sociology at Trinity Washington University in the District of Columbia, capital of the United States.

=== First Lady of the City of Guatemala ===
In 1991, Óscar Berger became the Metropolitan Mayor of Guatemala City. Wendy de Berger took charge of the city's social affairs, beginning several projects to help vulnerable groups like women and children. She promoted the construction of low-rent housing, founded a school for children to continue their education from kindergarten, and provided nursery programs for impoverished families. In 1996, de Berger began collaborating with the program Eduquemos a la Niña, designed to help educate troubled adolescents and teenagers and offer them scholarships. During Oscar Berger's presidential campaign in 2003, she developed and embarked on the "National Plan of Women's Crusades."

=== First Lady of Guatemala ===
On 14 January 2004, when Óscar Berger assumed the Presidency of Guatemala, Wendy took control of the Secretariat of Social Works of the Wife of the President of the Republic of Guatemala (SOSEP). Wendy has also collaborated with Dallas-based charity organization Helps International to provide safe, sanitary stoves to poor Guatemalan women who participated in community projects such as in Santo Domingo Xenacoj, where a new bakery was opened with provided stoves.

== Citations ==
Honorary titles
Preceded by Evelyn Morataya	First Lady of Guatemala; 2004–2008	Succeeded by Sandra Torres
Preceded by Evelyn Morataya	President of the Secretary of Social Work of the President's Wife; 2004–2008	Succeeded by Sandra Torres
Preceded by Patricia Escobar	First Lady of Guatemala City; 1991–1998	Succeeded by Patricia Escobar
Preceded by Position established	President of the Secretary of Social Work of the Mayor's Wife; 1992–1998	Succeeded by Patricia Escobar
