= Ana Fagianni de Maldonado =

Guatemalan diplomat and first lady (born 1943)

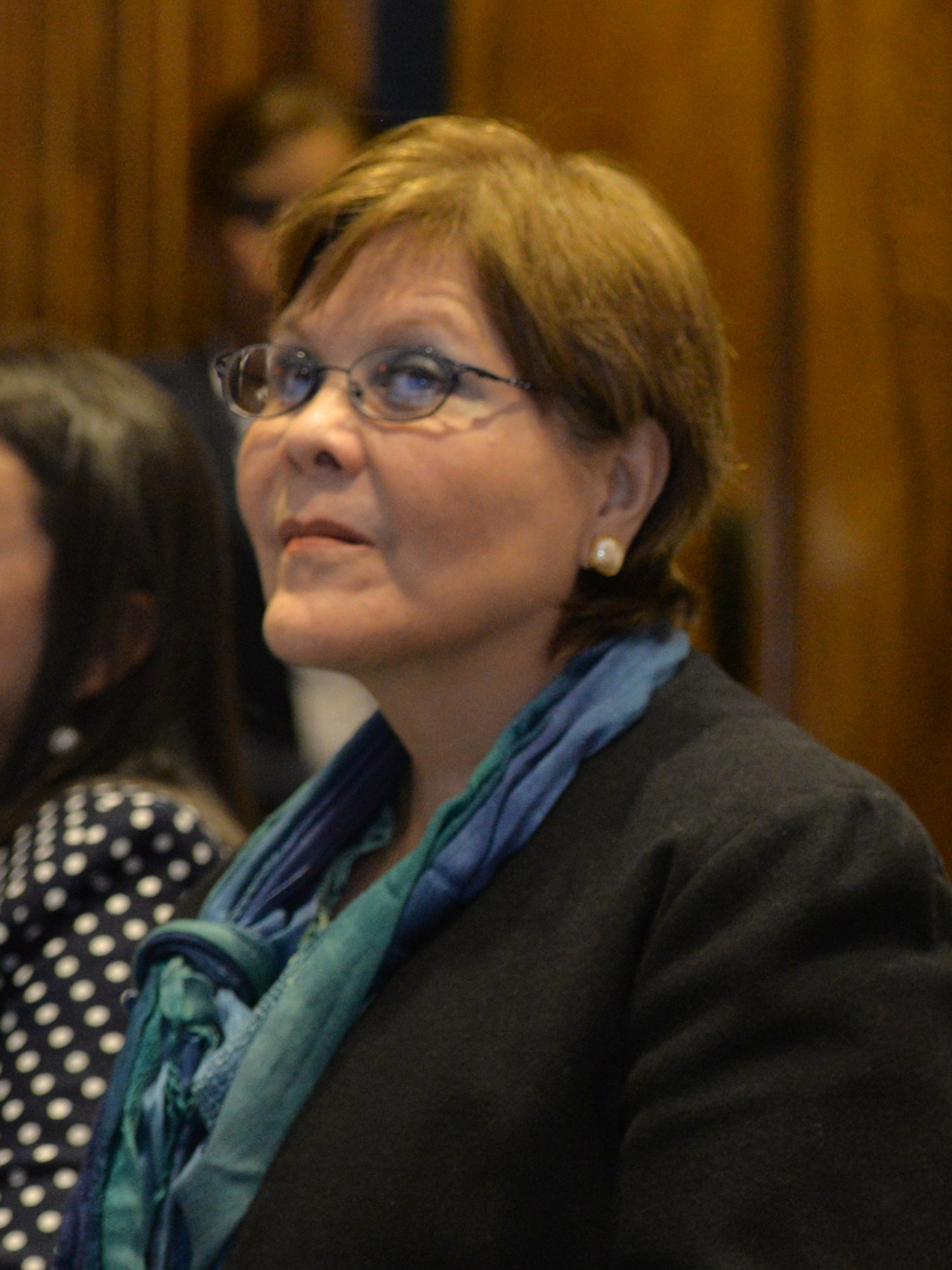
- Fagianni in 2015

First Lady of Guatemala
- In role September 3, 2015 – January 14, 2016
- President: Alejandro Maldonado
- Preceded by: Rosa María Leal
- Succeeded by: Patricia Marroquín

Second Lady of Guatemala
- In role May 14, 2015 – September 3, 2015
- Vice President: Alejandro Maldonado
- Preceded by: Mariano Paz
- Succeeded by: Sandra Eunice Rosales

Personal details
- Born: Ana Violeta Fagianni Enriquez c. 1943
- Spouse: Alejandro Maldonado

Ana Violeta Fagianni Enriquez de Maldonado (born c. 1943) is a Guatemalan diplomat and activist who served as the first lady of Guatemala from 2015 to 2016, as the wife of acting President Alejandro Maldonado.

Prior to becoming the country's first lady, Fagianni served as a career diplomat, including a posting as the Minister-counselor for the Embassy of Guatemala to Spain. She also served in El Salvador and Mexico. Additionally, Fagianni is an activist who has focused on women's rights, children and the elderly, and issues affecting people with disabilities in Guatemala.

In November 2015, First Lady Fagianni headed a major Guatemalan government delegation on a five-day official visit to Taiwan, where she held talks with President Ma Ying-jeou.

Honorary titles
Preceded by Mariano Paz	Second Lady of Guatemala; 2015	Succeeded by Sandra Eunice Rosales
Preceded by Rosa María Leal	First Lady of Guatemala; 2015–2016	Succeeded by Patricia Marroquín
