= Rosa Leal de Pérez =

Guatemalan psychologist and public official (1953–2025)

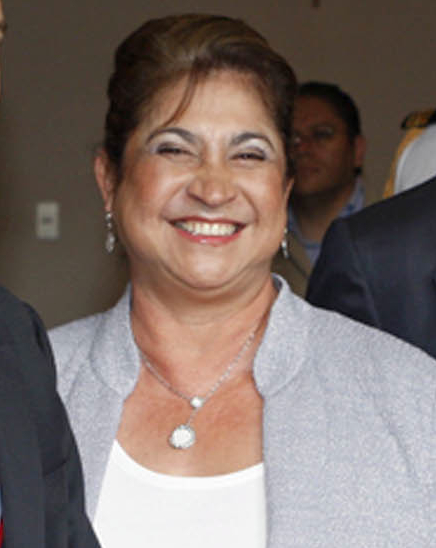
- Leal de Pérez in 2012

First Lady of Guatemala
- In role 14 January 2012 – 3 September 2015
- President: Otto Pérez Molina
- Preceded by: Sandra Torres
- Succeeded by: Ana Fagianni de Maldonado

Personal details
- Born: Rosa María Leal Flores; 9 December 1953 Guatemala City, Guatemala
- Died: 7 December 2025 (aged 71) Guatemala City, Guatemala
- Party: Patriotic Party
- Spouse: Otto Pérez Molina (m. 1970)
- Education: Universidad de San Carlos de Guatemala
- Occupation: Psychologist

Rosa María Leal Flores de Pérez (9 December 1953 – 7 December 2025) was a Guatemalan psychologist who served as the first lady of Guatemala from 2012 to 2015, as the wife of President Otto Pérez Molina.

== Life and career ==
Rosa Leal de Pérez was born in Guatemala City on 9 December 1953. She also studied in Guatemala City, enrolling at the Universidad de San Carlos de Guatemala where she took a degree in psychology. At 17, she married future President of Guatemala and General Otto Pérez Molina.

She was a kindergarten teacher for a period of four years, from 1975 to 1979, was a technician in psychometrics and school orientation, and had a degree in clinical psychology from Rafael Landívar University. From 1980 to 1995, she was the national director of primary education, specializing in nursery school. For the decade after her husband and Roxana Baldetti founded the Guatemalan Patriotic Party in 2001, Leal worked for the party's affairs.

Leal de Pérez died in Guatemala City on 7 December 2025, at the age of 71.

Honorary titles
| Preceded by Sandra Torres | First Lady of Guatemala; 2012–2015 | Succeeded by Ana Violeta Fagianni |
| Preceded by Sandra Torres | President of the Social Work Secretariat of the President's Wife; 2012–2015 | Succeeded by Ana Violeta Fagianni |
