= Dominique Wilson =

Guatemalan nutritionist

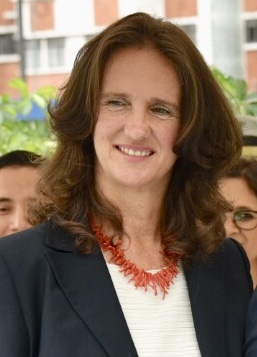

First Lady of the Guatemala City
- Incumbent
- In role 27 April 2017
- Preceded by: Patricia Escobar

Personal details
- Born: 12 August 1965 (age 60); Guatemala City, Guatemala
- Spouse: Ricardo Quiñónez Lemus

Dominique Denise Marie Wilson Arzú (born 12 August 1965) is a Guatemalan nutritionist. As director of AFA Guatemala, in 1994 she coordinated a year-long field study of artisan-made sustainable technology colloidal-silver impregnated water filters with over 600 Guatemalan families; correctly using the filter reduced the incidence of diarrhea in children under the age of five by half (diarrhea is the leading cause of death in this age group in third world countries). Her work led to Potters for Peace creating workshops in 30 countries, producing and distributing this type of water filter, and sharing the technology for free online.

Dominique Wilson has the First Lady of Guatemala City since 27 April 2017 as the wife of Ricardo Quiñónez Lemus, the current mayor of Guatemala City.

Wilson Arzú is the niece of the President and Mayor of Guatemala City Álvaro Arzú Irigoyen, his sister María Mercedes being her mother. Her father, Henry Hugh Wilson, was a British oil consultant.
