= Hermann zu Solms-Laubach =

German botanist

Hermann zu Solms-Laubach 1842–1915

Hermann zu Solms-Laubach, more precisely Hermann Maximilian Carl Ludwig Friedrich Graf zu Solms-Laubach (23 December 1842 in Laubach, Grand Duchy of Hesse – 24 November 1915 in Strasbourg) was a German botanist.

== Life ==
Count Solms-Laubach studied in Giessen, Berlin, Fribourg and Geneva. In 1868, he obtained habilitation at the University of Halle-Wittenberg. In 1872, he became an associate professor at the University of Strasbourg. In 1879, he was appointed professor and director of the botanical garden in Göttingen and once again in 1888 in Strasbourg.

From October 1883 to March 1884, he traveled in Java and stayed for 3 months at Buitenzorg (now Bogor, especially in the botanical garden), West Java and made several collections in the vicinity of Cibodas. He wrote a paper about the Bogor Botanical Gardens that he loved so much.

He was an honorary member of the Manchester Literary and Philosophical Society 1892, a member of the Linnean Society, the Royal Society, the Geographic Society; and recipient of the Gold Medal of the Linnean Society in 1911.

== Work ==
His work extended to most branches of botany, especially in systematics and paleontology. In addition to editing the "Botanische Zeitung" he contributed monographs, among others, on Rafflesiaceae, Caricaceae, Pandanaceae, Hydnoraceae, Chloranthaceae, Lennoaceae and Pontederiaceae to the works of Martius, de Candolle, Engler and Prantl.

The genera Solmsia Baill. (Thymelaeaceae) and Solms-laubachia Muschl. ex Diels (Brassicaceae) were named in his honor.

He is also commemorated in the genus Absolmsia (family Asclepiadaceae) Kuntze.

== Bibliography ==
- Complete bibliography on WorldCat

H. zu Solms-Laubach: ‘Der botanische Garten zu Buitenzorg’ (Bot. Zeitung 42, 1884, p. 753-761, 769-780, 785-791).

== Sources ==
- Based in part on the German version.
- Botanical Gazette 61:432, 1916
