= Secretary of Social Work of the President's Wife =

Secretary of Social Work of the President's Wife — SOSEP —
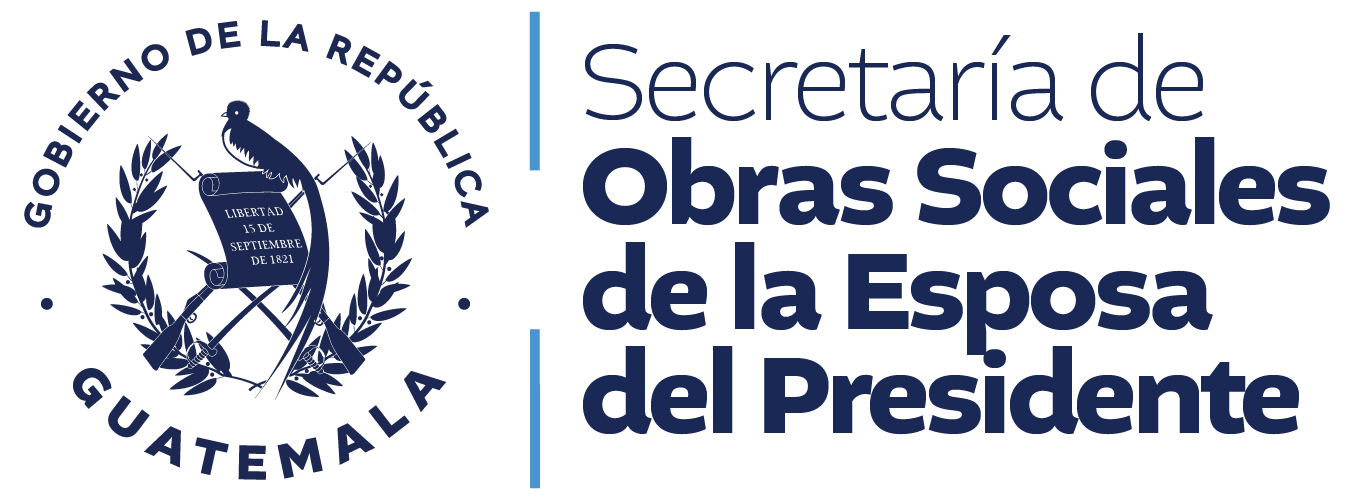

Agency overview
- Formed: July 14, 1994; 32 years ago
- Headquarters: Presidential House, Guatemala City, Guatemala
- Agency executive: Zulma Melizza Calderón Ordóñez
- Website: http://www.sosep.gob.gt/

The Secretariat of Social Work of the Wife of the President of the Republic of Guatemala (Spanish: Secretaría de Obras Sociales de la Esposa del Presidente (SOSEP)) is the organisation in charge of promoting and implementing social programs that benefit children, families and the community in general. The SOSEP works in coordination with the First Lady, and follow the guidelines they enact. It was established on July 14, 1994, during the government of President Jorge Serrano Elías, through government Article 893–91.
