= Patricia Escobar =

Salvadoran-Guatemalan entrepreneur and politician

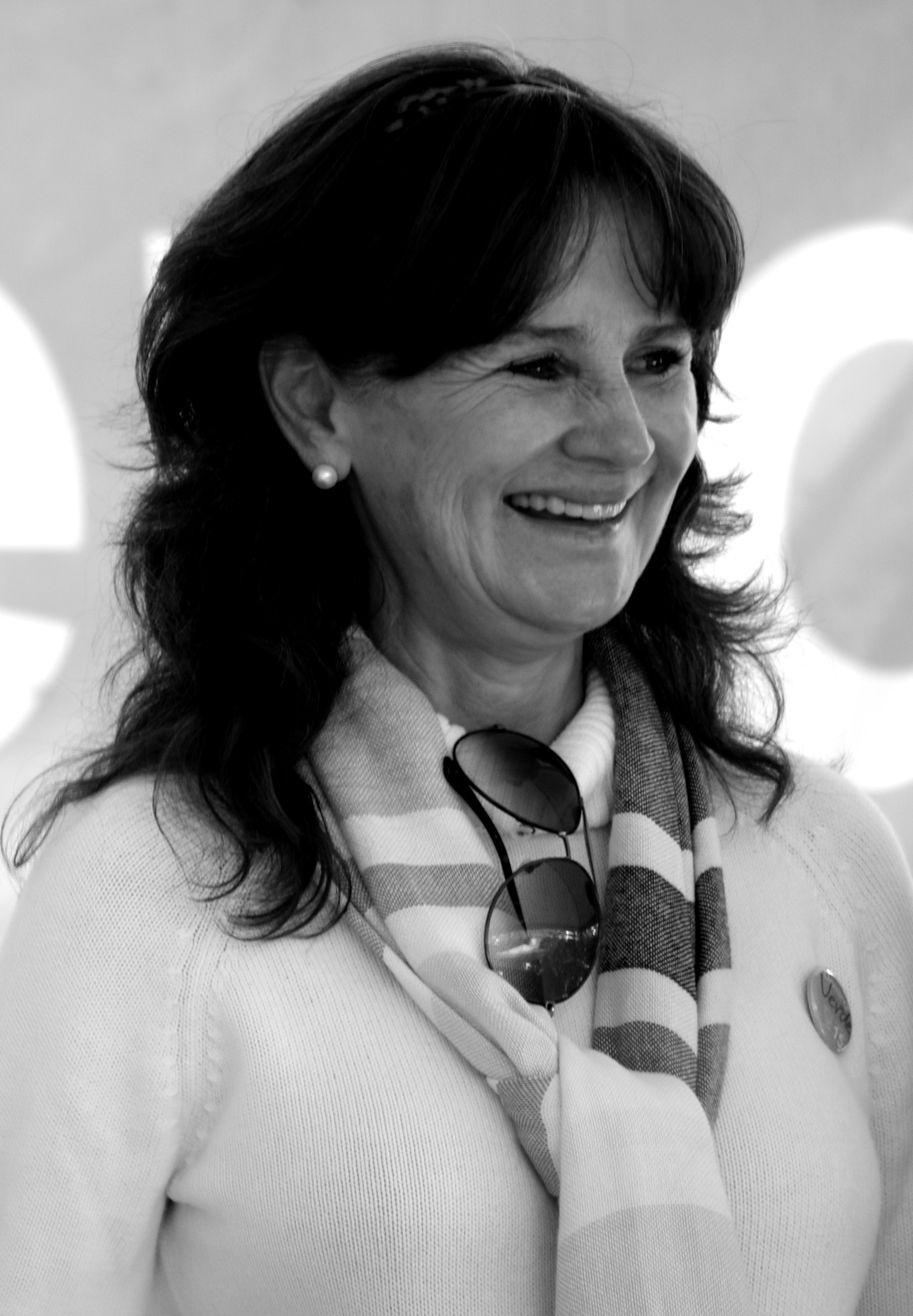

First Lady of Guatemala
- In role 14 January 1996 – 14 January 2000
- President: Álvaro Arzú
- Preceded by: María Eugenia Morales
- Succeeded by: Evelyn Morataya

First Lady of the Guatemala City
- In role 15 January 2000 – 27 April 2018
- Preceded by: Wendy Widmann
- Succeeded by: Dominique Wilson Arzú
- In role 15 January 1986 – 30 June 1990
- Succeeded by: Wendy Widmann

Personal details
- Born: October 3, 1953 (age 73) San Salvador
- Party: Unionist Party
- Spouse: Álvaro Arzú (1965–2018 his death)
- Education: Rafael Landívar University

Patricia Escobar de Arzú (born October 3, 1953), also known as Patricia de Arzú, is a Salvadoran-Guatemalan entrepreneur and politician. She is the widow of former president of Guatemala and mayor of Guatemala City, Álvaro Arzú Irigoyen, having served as First Lady of Guatemala from January 14, 1996, to January 14, 2000, and as First Lady of Guatemala City from 1991 to 1996, and again from 2004 until his death in 2018. She was an unsuccessful presidential candidate in the 2011 elections for the Unionist Party.

== Biography ==
Arzú was born on October 3, 1953, in San Salvador. She married Álvaro Arzú Irigoyen, with whom she had four children: María Andrée, Roberto Manuel, Alvaro, and Isabel. She has 11 grandchildren.

She graduated as a secretary in San Salvador. She studied business administration at the Broward Community School in Florida, United States, and philosophy at Rafael Landívar University in Guatemala. Her interest in improving the conditions for the most vulnerable in Guatemalan society has made her one of the best-known female entrepreneurs in Guatemala. In 1987, she was the founder and general coordinator of the Secretariat of Social Affairs of the Municipality of Guatemala, allowing her to create three children's gardens that continue offering services after 20 years.

Arzú ran as a candidate for president in the 2011 elections. She was 8th out of 10 candidates, with 97,277 votes, representing 2.19% of the total votes. She is the mother of politician Álvaro Arzú Escobar, former president of the Congress.

Honorary titles
Preceded by Wendy Widmann	First Lady of Guatemala City; 2000–2018	Succeeded by Dominique Wilson Arzú
Preceded by Wendy Widmann	President of the Secretary of Social; Work of the Mayor's Wife; 2000–2018	Succeeded by Dominique Wilson Arzú
Preceded by María Eugenia Morales	First Lady of Guatemala; 1996–2000	Succeeded by Evelyn Morataya
Preceded by María Eugenia Morales	President of the Secretary of Social; Work of the President's Wife; 1996–2000	Succeeded by Evelyn Morataya
Preceded by Vacant	First Lady of Guatemala City; 1986–1990	Succeeded by Wendy Widmann
Party political offices
Preceded by Fritz García Gallont	Unionist nominee for President of Guatemala; 2011	Succeeded by Roberto González Díaz-Durán
