= Elsa Cirigliano =

Former First Lady of Guatemala

First Lady of Guatemala
- In role October 12, 1978 – March 23, 1982
- President: Fernando Romeo Lucas García
- Preceded by: Hellen Lossi
- Succeeded by: María Teresa Sosa

Personal details
- Born: Elsa Asunción Cirigliano; 1934 (age 91–92) Lechería, Venezuela
- Spouse: Fernando Romeo Lucas García (m. 1978; died 2006)

Elsa Asunción Cirigliano Martínez was a Venezuelan woman, the wife of former President Fernando Romeo Lucas García.

She was secretly married on October 12, 1978, to Fernando Romeo Lucas García in the Presidential House, months after he assumed the Presidency. After the events that led to the overthrow of her husband, they fled to Venezuela, where they remained until the death of Romeo Lucas García in 2006.

Honorary titles
Preceded by Hellen Lossi	First Lady of Guatemala; 1978–1982	Succeeded by María Teresa Sosa
Preceded by Hellen Lossi	Board of Social Work of the President's Wife; 1978–1982	Succeeded by María Teresa Sosa
