= Aura Rosario Rosal López =

Wife of Guatemalan president (1928–2021)

First Lady of Guatemala
- In role 8 August 1983 – 14 January 1986
- President: Óscar Humberto Mejía Víctores
- Preceded by: María Teresa Sosa
- Succeeded by: Raquel Blandón

Personal details
- Born: Aura Rosario Rosal López; 12 May 1928; Flores Costa Cuca, Guatemala
- Died: November 3, 2021 (aged 93); Guatemala City
- Spouse: Óscar Humberto Mejía Víctores (m. 1953; died 2016)
- Children: 2

Aura Rosario Rosal López de Mejía (May 12, 1928 – November 3, 2021) was the wife of former Guatemalan President Óscar Humberto Mejía Víctores and First Lady of Guatemala from 1983 to 1986.

== Life ==
She was born on May 12, 1928 in Flores Costa Cuca, in Quetzaltenango. Her father was José Humberto Rosal Estrada, and her mother was Luz Otilia Lopez Giron.

She married Óscar Mejía Víctores in 1953 and had two daughters: Aura and Juana Rosario.

After the overthrow of Efraín Ríos Montt, Mejía Víctores assumed the position of Head of State. She maintained a low profile as First Lady. Mejía Víctores died on February 1, 2016.

She died on 3 November 2021 in Guatemala City at the age of 93. She is buried in the Guatemala City General Cemetery.

Honorary titles
Preceded by María Teresa Sosa	First Lady of Guatemala; 1983–1986	Succeeded by Raquel Blandón
Preceded by María Teresa Sosa	Board of Social Work of the President's Wife; 1983–1986	Succeeded by Raquel Blandón
