= Hellen Lossi =

Helen Losi

First Lady of Guatemala
- In role 1 July 1974 – 1 July 1978
- President: Kjell Eugenio Laugerud García
- Preceded by: Álida España
- Succeeded by: Elsa Cirigliano

Personal details
- Born: Helen Losi Zúñiga; 2 January 1927 Guatemala City, Guatemala
- Died: 27 December 1984 (aged 57) Guatemala City, Guatemala
- Spouse: Kjell Eugenio Laugerud García
- Children: Morell Laugerud Losi, Luis Fernando Laugerud Losi, Kjell Laugerud Losi, Karen Laugerud Losi, Karla Laugerud Losi

Helen Losi Zúñiga de Laugerud (2 January 1927 – 27 December 1984) was the First Lady of Guatemala from 1974–78 as wife of former Guatemalan President Kjell Eugenio Laugerud García.

During her husband's presidency, she accompanied Laugerud García to various activities, such as state visits to Mexico and Colombia, where she was decorated with the highest honors. Losi de Laugerud carried out social works for the welfare of many children. She was present during the visit of the kings of Spain, Juan Carlos I and Sofia.

A hospital in Cobán bears her name, as well as many streets and avenues in Guatemala.

Honorary titles
| Preceded by Álida España | First Lady of Guatemala; 1974–1978 | Succeeded by Elsa Cirigliano |
| Preceded by Álida España | Board of Social Work of the President's Wife; 1974–1978 | Succeeded by Elsa Cirigliano |
