= Marta Lainfiesta Dorión =

First Lady of Guatemala from 1931 to 1944

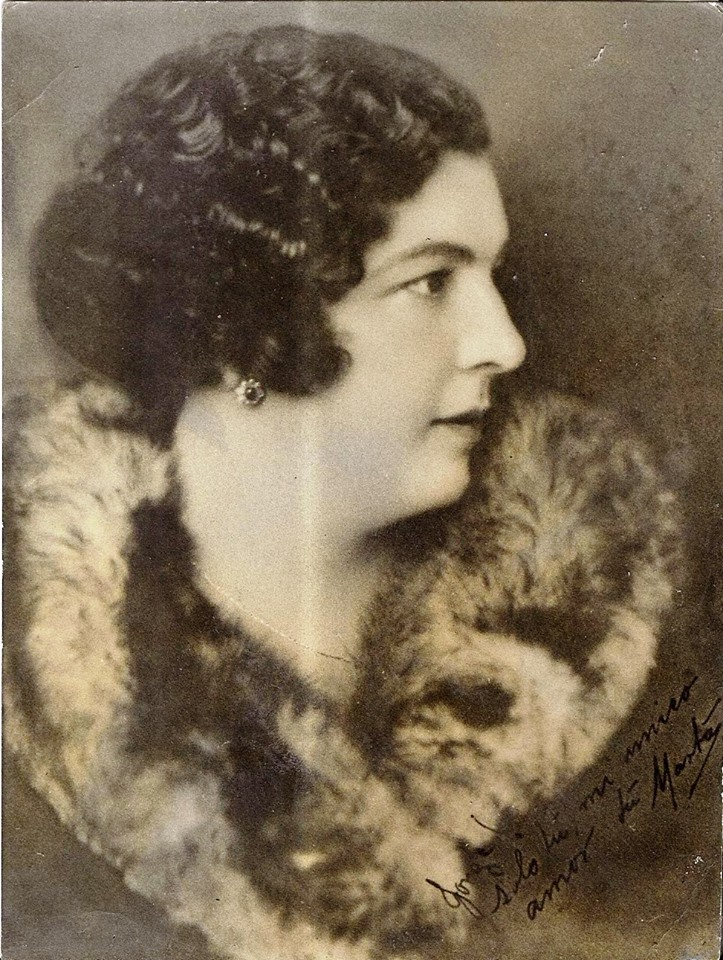

First Lady of Guatemala
- In role February 14, 1931 – July 1, 1944
- President: Jorge Ubico
- Preceded by: Soledad Trabanino
- Succeeded by: María Judith Ramírez Prado

Personal details
- Born: Marta Amalia Lainfiesta y Dorión; January 10, 1886; Guatemala City, Guatemala
- Died: May 8, 1976 (aged 90); Guatemala City, Guatemala
- Spouse(s): Jorge Ubico (m. 1905–1946); his death
- Children: Andrea Castañeda, Amailia Castañeda (mother of Andrea) Andrea Castañeda had Gabriel Rodrìguez ( May 15, 2005)

Marta Lainfiesta Dorión (January 10, 1886 – May 8, 1976) was the First Lady of Guatemala from 1931 to 1944, as the wife of Guatemalan President and dictator Jorge Ubico Castañeda.

She was born in Guatemala City, daughter of Victor Lainfiesta Torres and María Josefa Amalia Dorion Klée. Subsequently, she married on March 15, 1905, to General Jorge Ubico Castañeda.

During her husband's political career, she maintained a low profile even after Ubico assumed the presidency in 1931. Lainfiesta accompanied Ubico only on national and international trips, as well as brief appearances at official events and visits by foreign leaders.

After Ubico's resignation, Lainfiesta accompanied him to the United States and lived with him until his death in 1946. Subsequently, the remains of Ubico were repatriated, and she moved back to Guatemala, where she died in 1976.

Honorary titles
Preceded by Soledad Trabanino	First Lady of Guatemala; 1931–1944	Succeeded by María Judith Ramírez Prado
