= Sara de la Hoz =

First Lady of Guatemala
- In role July 1, 1966 – July 1, 1970
- President: Julio César Méndez Montenegro
- Preceded by: María del Carmen Carrasco
- Succeeded by: Álida España

Personal details
- Born: Sara de la Hoz de León; 6 March 1919; Guatemala City, Guatemala
- Died: 20 January 2015 (aged 95); Guatemala City, Guatemala
- Spouse(s): Carlos Lascout Campo; Julio César Méndez Montenegro

Sara de la Hoz (6 March 1919 – 20 January 2015) was a Guatemalan activist and politician. She was the wife of President Julio César Méndez Montenegro, first lady of Guatemala during his government.

During her husband's government, she gained great importance for her social activism. She created the Social Work Board of the President's Wife, visited the most needy and gave them the support they did not have.

Her husband died in April 1996; for his services rendered to Guatemala, Congress granted him a lifetime pension in 2004. She died at her family's side on January 20, 2015.

Honorary titles
Preceded by María del Carmen Carrasco	First Lady of Guatemala; 1966–1970	Succeeded by Álida España
Preceded by Position established	Board of Social Work of the President's Wife; 1966–1970	Succeeded by Álida España
