= Patricia Marroquín =

First Lady of Guatemala

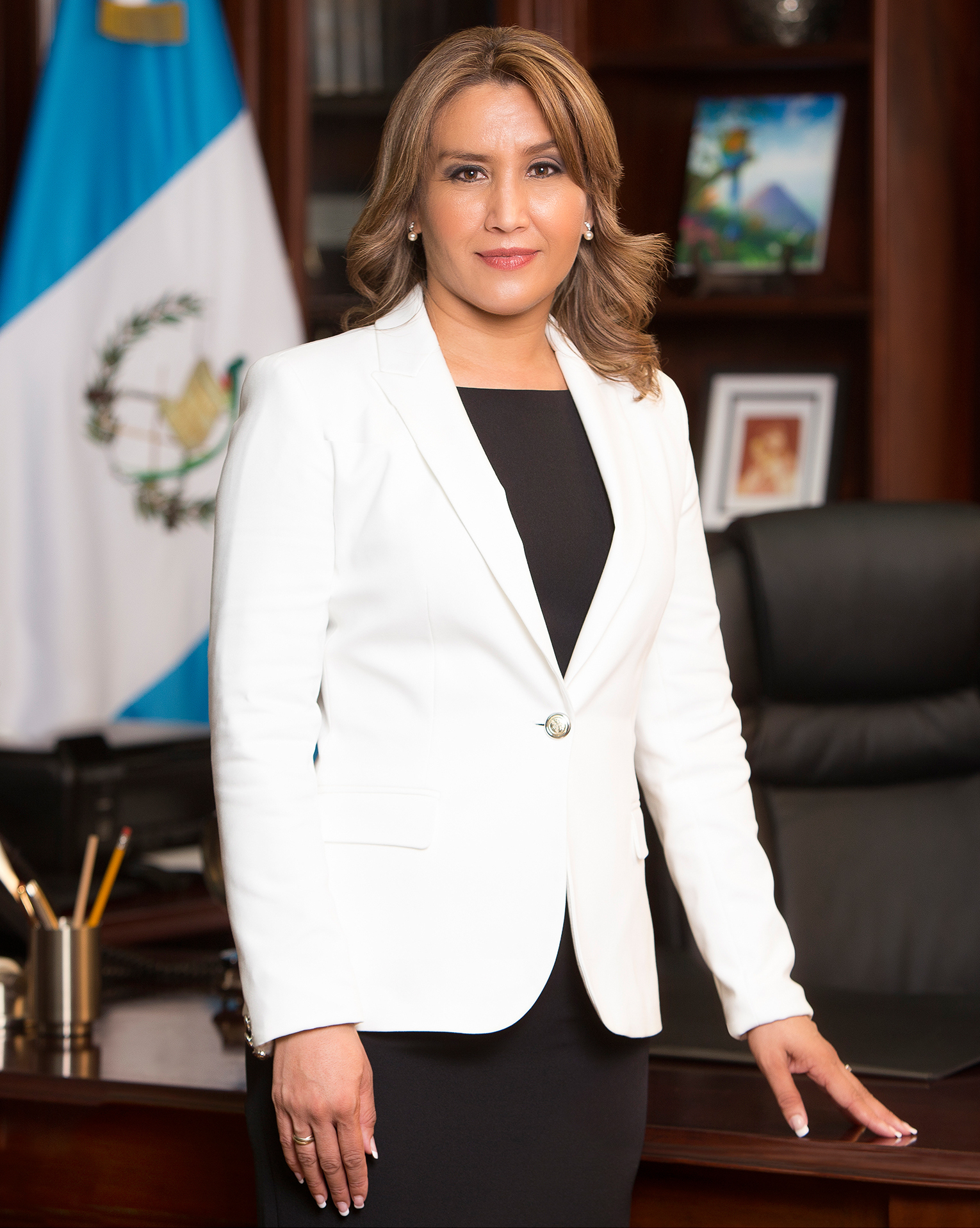
- Official portrait, 2016

First Lady of Guatemala
- In role January 14, 2016 – January 14, 2020
- President: Jimmy Morales
- Preceded by: Ana Violeta Fagianni Enriquez
- Succeeded by: Lucrecia Peinado (2024)

Personal details
- Born: Hilda Patricia Marroquín Argueta; 25 July 1970 (age 55) Guatemala City
- Spouse: Jimmy Morales (m. 1989)
- Children: 3

Hilda Patricia Marroquín Argueta de Morales (born July 25, 1970) is a Guatemalan public figure who served as the first lady of Guatemala from 2016 to 2020, as the wife of president Jimmy Morales.

== Biography ==
Born Hilda Patricia Marroquín Argueta, she studied at the Colegio Comercial Guatemalteco and the Universidad de San Carlos de Guatemala. She married producer Jimmy Morales in 1989. The couple have three children. In 2014, she worked in the Ministry of Health and Public Assistance.

Marroquín became First Lady of Guatemala in January 2016. She has focused on healthcare and social issues, as well as projects focused on children and adolescents. She has maintained a moderate figure and does not make frequent public appearances. She accompanied President Morales to several state visits: Israel, she met with Nechama Rivlin and Sara Netanyahu; France, met with French President Emmanuel Macron and Brigitte Macron. She was the first wife of a Latin American head of state to arrive at the Elysee Palace during the presidency of Emmanuel Macron and the United States, with President Morales attending a banquet hosted by President Donald Trump and First Lady Melania Trump.

Honorary titles
Preceded by Ana Violeta Fagianni Enriquez (Acting)	First Lady of Guatemala; 2016–2020	Succeeded by Lucrecia Peinado
