= Evelyn Morataya =

Guatemalan politician

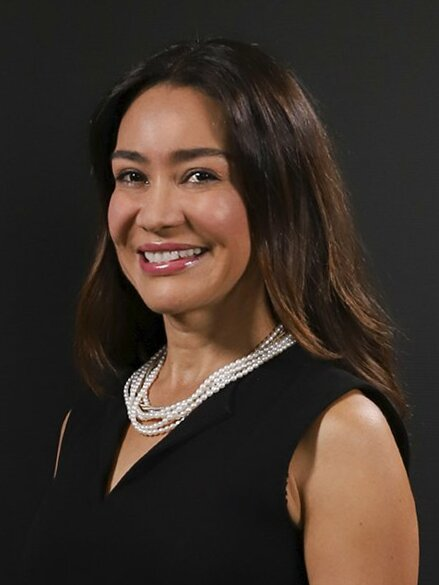
- Official portrait

First Lady of Guatemala
- In role 14 January 2000 – 14 January 2004
- President: Alfonso Portillo
- Preceded by: Patricia Escobar
- Succeeded by: Wendy Widmann

Member of the Congress of Guatemala
- Incumbent
- Assumed office 14 January 2020
- Constituency: National List

Personal details
- Born: Evelyn Morataya; 22 August 1972 (age 54)
- Party: Firmes (since 2026)
- Other political affiliations: FRG (until 2000); Todos (2015); BIEN (until 2020); Vision with Values (2022–2023)
- Spouse: Alfonso Portillo

Evelyn Oddeth Morataya Marroquín (born 22 August 1972) is a Guatemalan politician and activist who served as the first lady of Guatemala from 2000 to 2004, as the wife of President Alfonso Portillo. She became First Lady when she was 28 years old, being one of the youngest First Ladies in the history of Guatemala.

Morataya accompanied her husband to many state visits, highlighting the visit that Portillo and Morataya made to the Emperors of Japan in 2003 and the 11th Ibero-American Summit held in 2001.

After the government of Alfonso Portillo and accusations of corruption that were made against him, Morataya and Portillo divorced. Upon the return of Portillo in 2015 to Guatemala after serving a sentence in the United States, Morataya announced that she would seek to be a candidate for deputy for the political party Todos. A few days later she declined the candidacy.

Honorary titles
Preceded by Patricia Escobar	First Lady of Guatemala; 2000–2004	Succeeded by Wendy Widmann
Preceded by Patricia Escobar	President of the Secretary of Social Work of the President's Wife; 2000–2004	Succeeded by Wendy Widmann
