= Solms-laubachia himalayensis =

Scientific classification
- Kingdom: Plantae
- Clade: Tracheophytes
- Clade: Angiosperms
- Clade: Eudicots
- Clade: Rosids
- Order: Brassicales
- Family: Brassicaceae
- Genus: Solms-laubachia
- Species: S. himalayensis

Binomial name
- Solms-laubachia himalayensis (Cambess.) J.P.Yue, Al-Shehbaz & H.Sun

Synonyms
- Cheiranthus himalayensis Cambess.; Cheiranthus himalaicus Hook.f. & Thomson; Christolea himalayensis (Cambess.) Jafri; Desideria himalayensis (Cambess.) Al-Shehbaz; Ermania himalayensis (Cambess.) O.E.Schulz; Oreoblastus himalayensis (Cambess.) Suslova; Parrya himalayensis (Cambess.) Rupr. ex Maxim.

Species of flowering plant

Solms-laubachia himalayensis is a flowering plant in the family Brassicaceae. The specific epithet himalayensis is from the Latin, meaning "Himalayan".

== Description ==
Solms-laubachia himalayensis grows as a herb from 4 centimetres (1.6 in) to 20 centimetres (8 in) tall. The racemes feature from 6 to 25 flowers. These flowers are purple or lilac with a yellow centre. Its fruits are lanceolate and measure up to 3.5 cm (1.4 in) long. Its brown seeds are ovate. The plant flowers from June to August and fruits from July to October.

== Distribution and habitat ==
Solms-laubachia himalayensis is a high-altitude species growing naturally in Nepal, the western Himalayas and Tibet. Its habitat is alpine tundra, in hills or on scree, typically from 4,200 m (13,800 ft) to 5,600 m (18,400 ft) altitude. Along with Ranunculus trivedii, it is the highest altitude flowering plant on record. In 1955, specimens were discovered at 6,400 m (21,000 ft) by Narendra Dhar Jayal on an expedition to Kamet mountain in present-day Uttarakhand.
