= Lucrecia Peinado =

First Lady of Guatemala since 2024

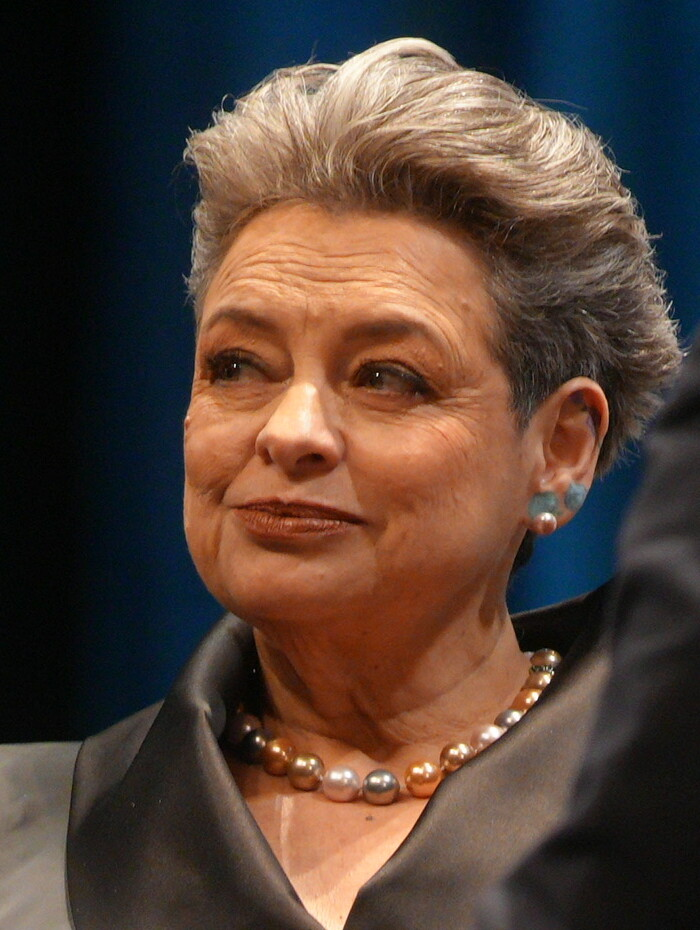
- Peinado in 2024

First Lady of Guatemala
- Current
- Assumed role 14 January 2024
- President: Bernardo Arévalo
- Preceded by: Marcela Giammattei (acting); Patricia Marroquín

Personal details
- Born: Lucrecia Eugenia Peinado Villanueva; 1961 (age 64–65) Guatemala City, Guatemala
- Party: Semilla
- Spouse: Bernardo Arévalo (m. 2011)
- Education: Universidad de San Carlos de Guatemala

Lucrecia Eugenia Peinado Villanueva (born 1961) is a Guatemalan physician, surgeon, and health care administrator who has been the first lady of Guatemala since 2024 as the wife of President Bernardo Arévalo.

== Biography ==
Peinado was born in Guatemala City into an evangelical family. Her grandparents were evangelical pastors of small churches in Mixco.

She graduated as a doctor and surgeon from the Universidad de San Carlos de Guatemala, later specializing in anesthesiology and health management. She worked as an administrator of health projects focused on the fight against malaria, HIV/AIDS, and the reduction of maternal death.

== Personal life ==
Peinado met Bernardo Arévalo in 1999 while working at the United Nations Development Programme office in Guatemala. She and Arévalo married in 2011 and lived in Geneva, Switzerland. They returned to Guatemala in 2014. In addition to her native Spanish, Peinado speaks English.

Peinado's father, Rubén, died on 28 June 2023, three days after the 2023 general election, where Bernardo Arévalo qualified to participate in the second round.

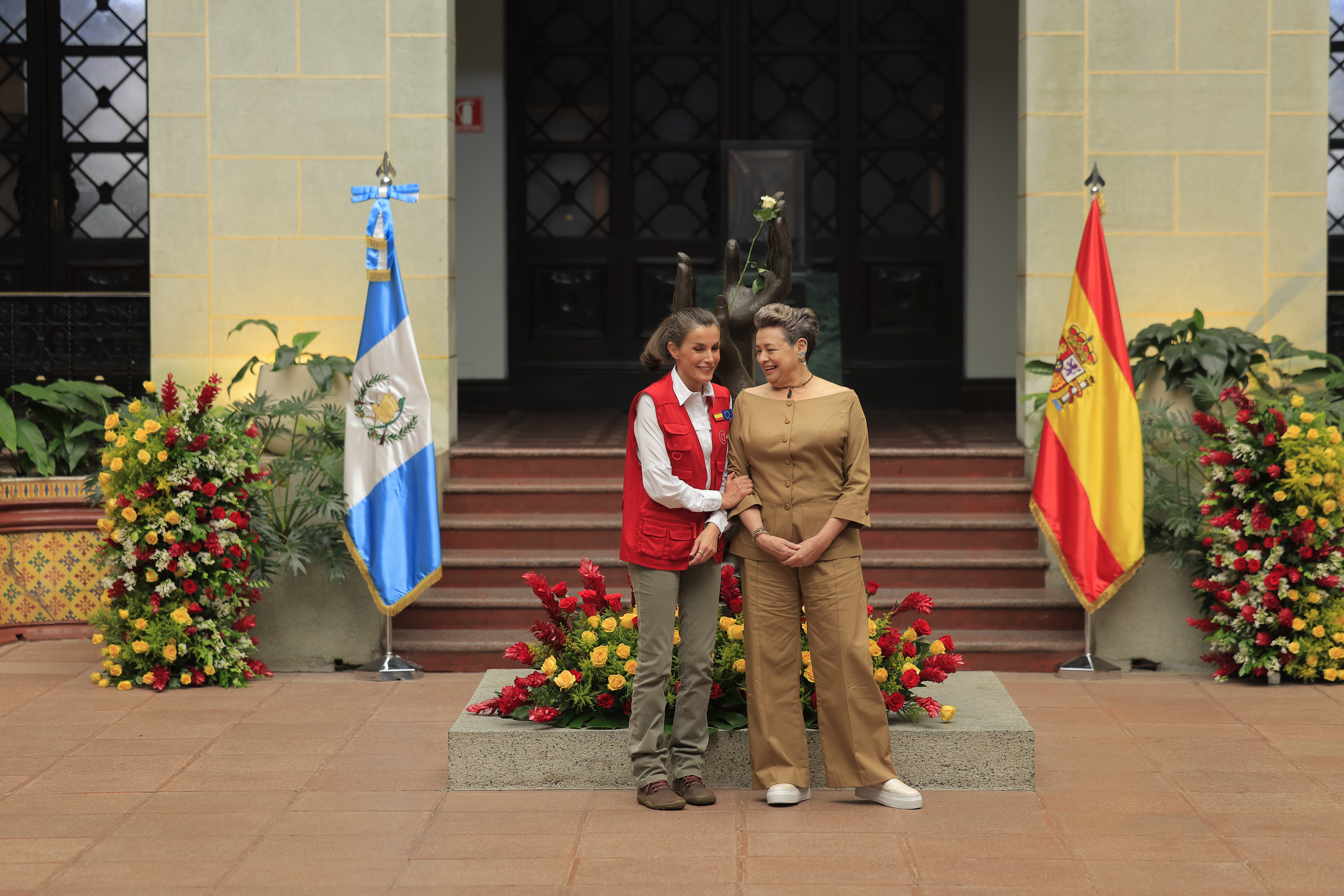
Peinado welcomes Queen Letizia of Spain at the National Palace

Honorary titles
Preceded by Patricia Marroquín (2020)	First Lady of Guatemala; 2024–present	Incumbent
Preceded by Patricia Marroquín (2020)	Head of the Secretary of Social Work of the President's Wife; 2024–present	Incumbent
