= Francisca Aparicio de Barrios =

First lady of Guatemala

The Most Excellent The Marchioness of Vistabella
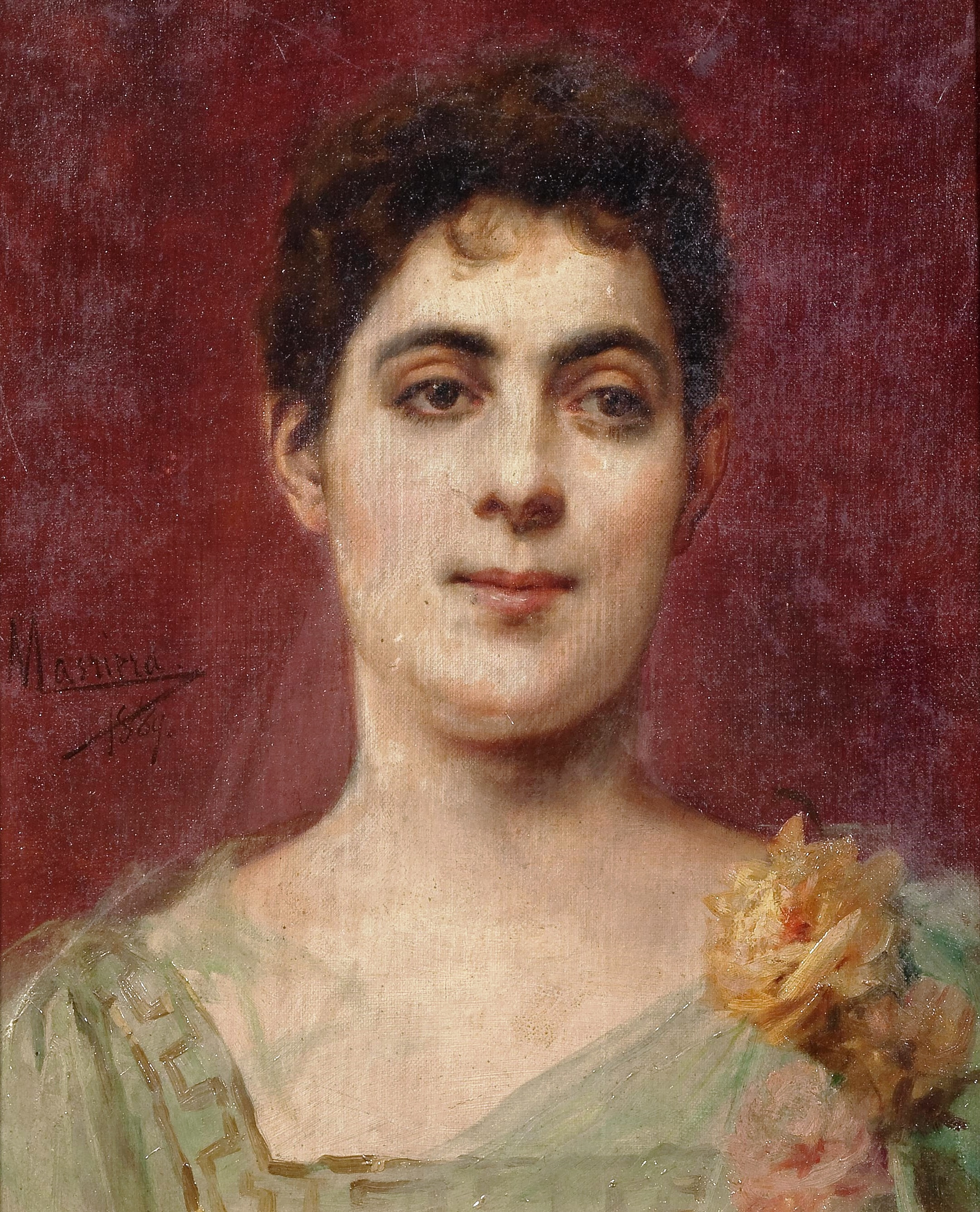

First Lady of Guatemala
- In role 24 July 1874 – 2 April 1885
- President: Justo Rufino Barrios
- Preceded by: María García Granados
- Succeeded by: Carmen Ramírez

Personal details
- Born: Francisca Aparicio y Mérida; 23 July 1858 Quetzaltenango, Guatemala
- Died: 31 January 1943 (aged 84) Bern, Switzerland
- Spouses: Justo Rufino Barrios (m. 1874; died 1885) José Martínez de Roda (m. 1892; died 1899)
- Occupation: First Lady of Guatemala

Francisca Aparicio, 1st Marquis of Vistabella (23 July 1858 – 31 January 1943) was the First Lady of Guatemala between 1874 and 1885, performing the state duties required for the post. After her husband's death, she moved with her seven children to New York City and was well known for her entertainments. In 1892, she married a Spanish parliamentarian and moved to Europe, where her children were educated. Two paintings of her, painted by Francisco Masriera y Manovens are in the collection of the Museo del Prado in Madrid. When she was 14, she married Justo Rufino Barrios and immediately became the first Guatemalan First Lady in history to take office.

== Early life ==
Francisca Aparicio y Mérida was born on 23 July 1858, in Quetzaltenango, Guatemala to Francisca Gregoria Mérida y Estrada and Juan José Aparicio y Limón and baptized the following day at the Catedral del Espíritu Santo de Quetzaltenango. She was the third child in the family of eleven children and the oldest daughter. Her father owned the Santa Cecelia coffee plantation, which contained 400,000 coffee plants, the largest privately owned plantation in the Suchitepéquez Department and a second coffee farm which had 100,000 plants. During the uprising led by Miguel García Granados against the President Vicente Cerna in 1871, Justo Rufino Barrios was stationed in Quetzaltenango and met the young girl. He became infatuated with her, but her parents, thinking she was too young, sent her to Guatemala City to the school run by Ursuline nuns, which catered to the upper classes in the country. Not giving up his pursuit, when Barrios was elected to the presidency in 1873, he won-over the objections of her parents to his marriage proposal. Later, Barrios made her father governor of the Quetzaltenango Department, which gave him the authority to distribute the land in the area.

== First Lady of Guatemala ==
On 24 July 1874 Aparicio married Barrios in a civil ceremony in her home town. According to custom, they were then married in a religious ceremony on 5 August 1874 at the Catedral del Espíritu Santo. A grand ball held to honor the couple took place amidst an earthquake which initially was believed would not be serious. The quake left around 200 people dead and destroyed or severely damaged six towns. In spite of her young age, Barrios entrusted Aparicio with the duties of state, placing her in charge of political and state functions both at home and abroad. They traveled extensively in the United States and Europe during his presidency and the couple had seven children: Elena (1875–1944), Maria de la Luz (1876–1949), Jose Ignacio (1877–1895), Maria Josefa (1878–1959), Cárlos (1880–1897), Justo Rufino, Jr. (1882–1909) and Julia Francisca (1884–1905). Within a few months of her youngest daughter's birth, her husband was killed on the battlefield in 1885, while trying to unite the countries of Central America into a confederated state.

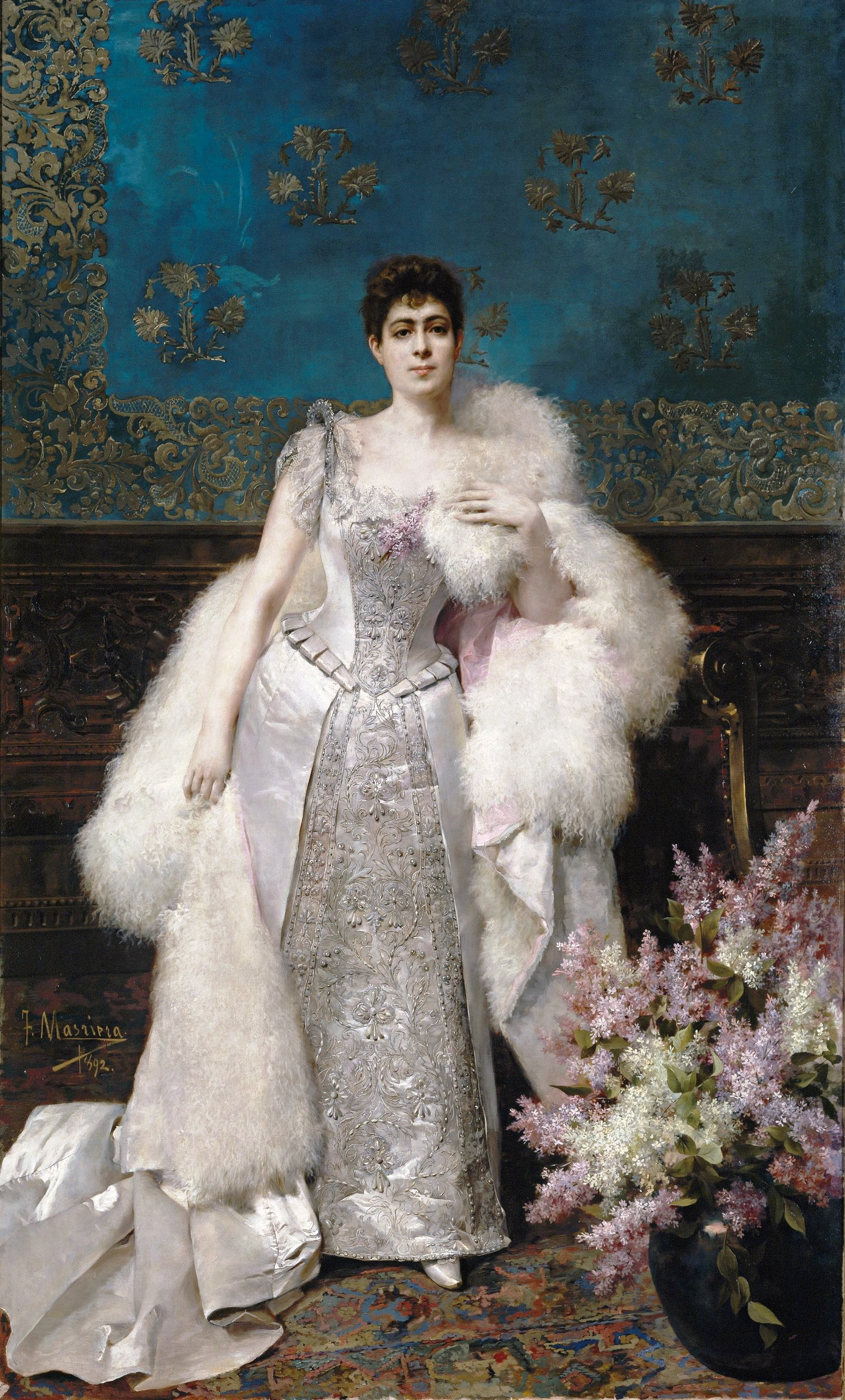
Francisca Aparicio y Mérida, Marquesa consorte de Vistabella by Francisco Masriera y Manovens, 1892

Almost immediately after her husband's funeral, de Barrios, who had inherited her husband's fortune outright, set sail with her children for San Francisco. They remained in California briefly before moving to New York City. Around the same time, her parents also moved to New York to establish an office to facilitate distribution of his agricultural products in the United States. In New York, she bought the property located at 855 Fifth Avenue, which quickly became a gathering place for Spanish-American society figures of the city. She enjoyed entertaining in her opulent mansion, decorated with Latin American artworks, and was known for her dancing and skill with classical music. She also had a private opera and was known for engaging local artists for performances and lavish costume balls. Her entertainments were widely covered in the society press with descriptions of her gowns and extensive collection of jewelry.

In 1891, accompanied by her mother and family, de Barrios traveled to Barcelona for the International Exposition. From Barcelona, they traveled to Madrid, where at a circus party, she met José Martínez de Roda, Marqués de Vistabella, a Spaniard, whose family were from Granada. Roda was a member of the Spanish Congress of Deputies and the two saw each other often during the social season. They entered into an engagement and the following spring, on 21 April 1892, the couple married at de Barrios's home on Fifth Avenue. A double service was performed with Hugh J. Grant, mayor of New York City performing the civil service and Archbishop Michael Corrigan performing the religious ceremony. When the family moved to Europe, Perry Belmont, a one-time Minister to the court of Spain, took over her house on Fifth Avenue. For the next several years, the family made their home traveling between Madrid, Biarritz and Paris. In June 1899, her father died in New York City. Six months later, in December 1899, the Marqués de Vistabella died suddenly while the couple was in Paris, leaving the Marquesa widowed for a second time.

For the remainder of her life, the Marquesa de Vistabella's daughter Elena was her constant companion. Elena never married. When the Marquis de Vistabella died, having no children himself, he designated his wife's son Justo Rufino Barrios y Aparicio as his heir. When Justo died in 1909 in Paris, as he had no heirs and his mother had no more living sons, the title passed to her oldest daughter, Elena. Maria de la Luz, the second daughter, married Juan Alcalá Galiano y Osma, the Count of Romilla Maria Josefa married D. Tomás Terrazas y Azpeitia, Marquis de la Ensenada. In 1940, the Marquesa moved to Switzerland.

== Death and legacy ==
The Marquesa died on 31 January 1943 in Bern, Switzerland. Francisco Masriera y Manovens painted two portraits of her, which are now in the collection of the Museo del Prado in Madrid. One is an oil on canvas painted in 1889. The other oil painting was completed in 1892.

Honorary titles
Preceded by María García Granados	First Lady of Guatemala; 1874–1885	Succeeded by Carmen Ramírez
