= Data Interchange Standards Association =

The Data Interchange Standards Association (DISA) was the organization that supported various other organizations, for the most part, responsible for the development of cross-industry electronic business interchange standards.

DISA served as the Secretariat for ASC X12 and their X12 EDI and XML standards development process. As of January 2016, DISA no longer exists. The Accredited Standards Committee (ASC) X12 develops and maintains the most widely implemented EDI standards.

These standards interface with a multitude of e-commerce technologies and serve as the premier tool for integrating e-commerce applications. Through the X12 Committee's standards and active participation in emerging and relevant technical initiatives (XML, ebXML), they foster cross-industry consensus and set the norm for more effective data exchange.

== See also ==
- American National Standards Institute
- Electronic Data Interchange
