= Algeria Benton de Reyna =

Algeria Benton
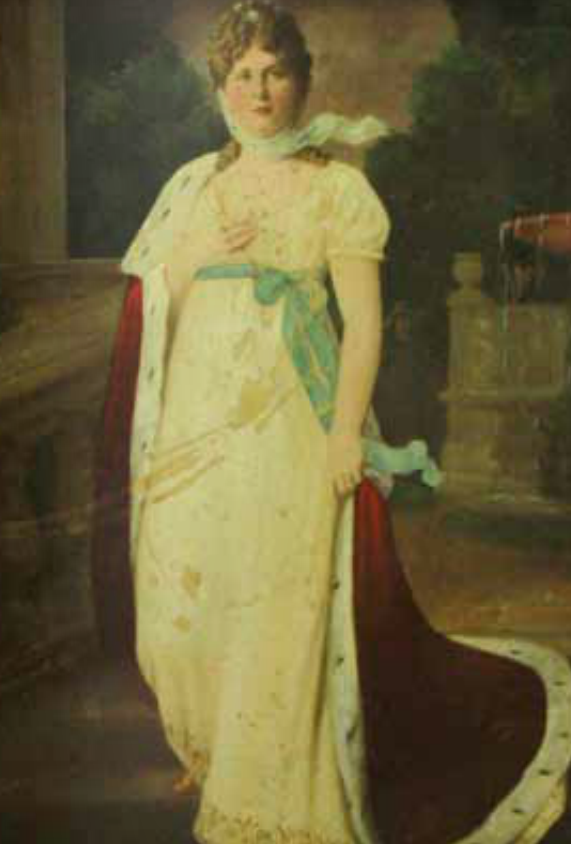

First Lady of Guatemala
- In role March 15, 1892 – February 8, 1898
- President: José María Reina Barrios
- Preceded by: María Robles
- Succeeded by: Desideria Ocampo

Personal details
- Born: Algeria Benton de Reyna; 1 July 1869 Virginia, United States
- Died: 20 April 1915 (aged 45) Mississippi, United States
- Spouse: José María Reina Barrios (m. 1885; died 1898)
- Occupation: First Lady of Guatemala

Algeria Benton de Reyna Barrios (born c. 1869-April 20, 1915) was the First Lady of Guatemala and wife of President José María Reyna Barrios. Benton married Reina Barrios on May 17, 1886, at the consulate of Guatemala in New York, whose consul was Enrique Toriello.

== Biography ==
On April 4, the vanquished arrived in Guatemala City. His capacity and courage were recognized when the National Assembly promoted him to general of division and to the position of undersecretary of State in the office of the War. Then, President Barillas, who feared the influence of Reina Barrios for his great military prestige and for being a direct relative of the late Justo Rufino Barrios, appointed him Consul of Guatemala in Berlin, but when he arrived in Europe, the Consul in France informed him that his credentials had been withdrawn during the crossing and he practically evicted him from the consulate. Reina Barrios returned to the United States, where he met his future wife Algeria Brenton, who was 17 years old, had a distinguished family from Virginia, and worked as a vedette in New Orleans, Louisiana Algeria Benton and José María Reyna Barrios married on 17 May 1886. During these trips, Reina Barrios learned to speak English and French properly and write German correctly. In 1887, after returning to Guatemala, he assumed the vice presidency of the National Legislative Assembly and later in 1889, he was imprisoned by the government of President Barillas for his alleged participation in the revolutionary movements of Mataquescuintla, until the Superior Council of War decreed his freedom when proven innocent; while he was in prison, his wife Algeria Benton had to ask for help from Minister Antonio Batres Jáuregui so that he could bring food to Reina Barrios.

After this situation he voluntarily moved to the United States; When the "First Totoposte War" took place in December 1891 after the coup d'état of the Ezetas in El Salvador, he returned to Guatemala to collaborate with the army, but peace had already been signed with El Salvador without having initiated hostilities. . When the presidential contest began, he told General Barillas that he would take care of him and not prosecute him when he left the presidency.

As a formal position, Algeria de Reyna held the post of First Lady of Guatemala, during the presidency of José María Reyna Barrios. By 1898, the relationship between Reina Barrios and Algeria Benton was cold and distant and had been for more than a year; But the lady was six months pregnant when the murder occurred. During a visit by the doctor, Reina Barrios made it clear that the problems that afflicted her were not pregnancy, but because of her alcoholism, making it clear to the doctor that the son of Mrs. Reina Barrios was not the president's.

After the death of her husband, Algeria Benton lost her mind and returned to the United States leaving unresolved issues in Guatemala; the writer and historian Antonio Batres Jáuregui, who was an advisor to President Reina Barrios, indicates that perhaps it was due to remorse, since Algeria Benton had been pregnant with an extramarital affair with General Salvador Toledo, Queen's Chief of Staff, and to whom insistently He was accused of being implicated in the president's murder. Its luxurious residence located on the Paseo 30 de Junio, Villa Algeria, was abandoned for a long time. She left with a baby in her arms, whom she named Consuelo. She returned to New Orleans, and began to abuse alcohol and recreational drugs, eventually to be arrested in London and New York, accused of intoxication. Her relationship with her daughter was so distant that the New Orleans Times Picayune reported that the widow had abandoned her daughter on the steps of the Magdalena church in Paris. As a result of the poor health of the widow, in addition to her drug addiction and alcoholism, Consuelo was admitted to a convent in the city of London, on the orders of the Minister of Guatemala in London, José Tible, brother of the mother of Guatemalan chronicler Enrique Gómez Carrillo, who coincidentally, would also be Guatemala's consul in Hamburg. For the new year of 1910, Algeria Benton entered the Touro-Shakespeare Asylum in New Orleans, penniless and almost blind. The Touro-Shakespeare Asylum was built with funds left for that purpose by southern philanthropist Juha P. Touro, and was located on present-day Daneel Street, between Joseph Street and Nashville Avenue. The building was demolished in 1932.

Consuelo Reina Barrios lived under the tutelage of President Manuel Estrada Cabrera who had instructed José Tible to send her to live in a convent in England: the St Mary's Abbey School in Hendon Middlesex. Until then, she went to her mother to visit her from time to time accompanied by a nurse who cared for her, because by then Mrs. Benton de Reina was already immersed in a serious problem of drug addiction and alcoholism Algeria Benton lived her last years in New Orleans and died April 20, 1915, while visiting friends in Biloxi, Mississippi. By then, Consuelo had already returned to Guatemala, and there she became seriously ill with Spanish influenza after the earthquakes of 1917 and 1918 and was sent to New Orleans, United States in 1918, because of her grandmother, C.B. Wheeler. There she died on June 8, 1919, without having recovered from her illness.

Honorary titles
| Preceded by María Robles | First Lady of Guatemala; 1892–1898 | Succeeded by Desideria Ocampo |
