= First Lady of Guatemala =

Spouse of the President of Guatemala

- Primera Dama de Guatemala
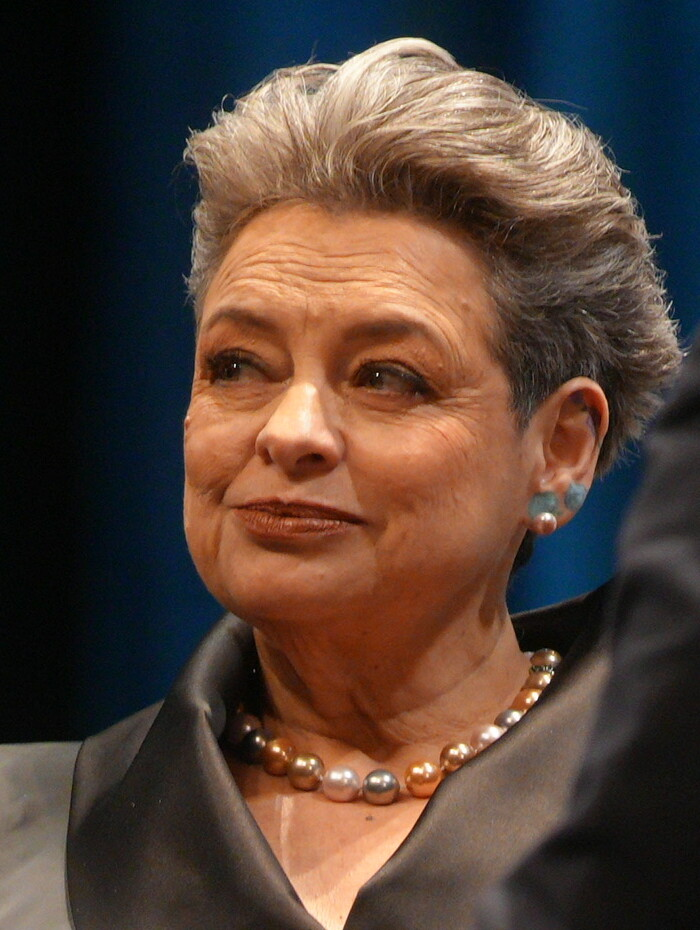
- Incumbent; Lucrecia Peinado since 14 January 2024
- Style: Madam (informal); First Lady of the Republic (alternative); Her Excellency (diplomatic, outside Guatemala)
- Residence: Guatemalan National Palace
- Inaugural holder: Petrona Carrera (de facto); Elisa Martínez Contreras (de iure)
- Formation: 21 March 1847 (de facto); 15 March 1945 (de iure)

First Lady of Guatemala is the title held by the wife of the president of Guatemala or designee. The current first lady is Lucrecia Peinado, wife of President Bernardo Arévalo, since 14 January 2024.

In the First Lady's Office, located in the Presidential House, only the portraits of sixteen recognized former first ladies are exhibited.

== First ladies of Guatemala ==
Recognized first ladies

| First Lady | | President | Tenure |
|---|---|---|---|
| 1 | Petrona Álvarez de Carrera | Rafael Carrera | 1839-1848 |
| 2 | Position Vacant | Juan Antonio Martínez | 1848 |
| 3 | Position Vacant | José Bernardo Escobar | 1848-1849 |
| 4 | Position Vacant | Mariano Paredes | 1849-1851 |
| 5 | Petrona Álvarez de Carrera | Rafael Carrera | 1851-1857 (Note: Petrona Álvarez died in 1857. Rafael Carrera was president until 1865.) |
| 5 | Position Vacant | Rafael Carrera | 1857-1865 (Note: The position became vacant after the death of Petrona García.) |
| 6 | María Dolores de Aycinena y Micheo | Pedro de Aycinena | 1865 |
| 7 | Josefa Gutiérrez Argueta de Cerna | Vicente Cerna y Cerna | 1865-1871 |
| 8 | María Saborío y García Granados | Miguel García Granados | 1871-1873 |
| 9 | Francisca Aparicio y Mérida de Barrios | Justo Rufino Barrios | 1874-1882 |
| 9 | Rafaela Monterroso Cardona de Orantes | José María Orantes | 1882-1883 (Note: Interim, while Justo Rufino Barrios was out of the country with his wife.) |
| 9 | Francisca Aparicio y Mérida de Barrios | Justo Rufino Barrios | 1883-1885 |
| 10 | Carmen Ramírez de Sinibaldi | Alejandro M. Sinibaldi | 1885 |
| 11 | María Robles de Barillas | Manuel Lisandro Barillas Bercián | 1885-1892 |
| 12 | Algeria Benton de Reyna | José María Reina Barrios | 1892-1898 |
| 13 | Desideria Ocampo de Estrada | Manuel Estrada Cabrera | 1898–1910 (Note: Desideria Ocampo died in 1910. Manuel Estrada Cabrera was president until 1920.) |
| 13 | Vacant | Manuel Estrada Cabrera | 1910–1920 (Note: The position became vacant after the death of Desideria Ocampo.) |
| 14 | Mercedes Llerandi de Herrera | Carlos Herrera y Luna | 1920–1921 |
| 15 | Mercedes Flores de Orellana | José María Orellana | 1921–1926 |
| 16 | Josefina de Chacón | Lázaro Chacón González | 1926–1930 |
| 17 | Luz Castañeda de Palma | Baudilio Palma | 1930 |
| 18 | Soledad Trabanino de Andrade | José María Reina Andrade | 1931 |
| 19 | Marta Lainfiesta Dorión | Jorge Ubico Castañeda | 1931–1944 |
| 20 | María Judith Ramírez Prado de Ponce Vaides | Federico Ponce Vaides | 1944 |
| 21 | Maria Cristina Villanova; Amalia Mancilla de Arana; María Leonor Saravia | Military Junta; Jacobo Árbenz; Francisco Arana; Jorge Toriello | 1944–1945 |
| 22 | Elisa Martínez Contreras de Árevalo | Juan José Arévalo | 1945–1951 |
| 23 | Maria Cristina Villanova | Jacobo Árbenz | 1951–1954 |
| 24 | Odilia Palomo Paíz | Carlos Castillo Armas | 1954–1957 |
| 25 | Julia Solís Gallardo de Gónzales | Luis Arturo González López | 1957 |
| 26 | Virginia Ruiz de Flores | Guillermo Flores Avendaño | 1957–1958 |
| 27 | María Teresa Laparra de Ydígoras | Miguel Ydígoras Fuentes | 1958–1963 |
| 28 | Beli de Peralta | Enrique Peralta Azurdia | 1963–1966 |
| 29 | Sara de la Hoz | Julio César Méndez Montenegro | 1966–1970 |
| 30 | Álida España de Arana | Carlos Manuel Arana Osorio | 1970–1974 |
| 31 | Hellen Lossi | Kjell Eugenio Laugerud García | 1974–1978 |
| 32 | Elsa Cirigliano (Note: Cirigliano and Lucas married shortly after the inauguration of General Lucas Garcia, but they kept their wedding secret for the security of the First Lady, since the Guatemalan Civil War was raging at the same time.) | Fernando Romeo Lucas García | 1978–1982 |
| 33 | María Teresa Sosa | Efraín Ríos Montt | 1982–1983 |
| 34 | Aura Rosario Rosal López | Óscar Humberto Mejía Victores | 1983–1986 |
| 35 | Raquel Blandón | Marco Vinicio Cerezo Arévalo | 1986–1990 |
| 36 | Magda Bianchi Lázzari | Jorge Serrano Elías | 1990–1993 |
| 37 | María Eugenia Morales de León | Ramiro de León Carpio | 1993–1996 |
| 38 | Patricia de Arzú | Álvaro Arzú Irigoyen | 1996–2000 |
| 39 | Evelyn Morataya | Alfonso Portillo | 2000–2004 |
| 40 | Wendy de Berger | Óscar Berger | 2004–2008 |
| 41 | Sandra Torres | Álvaro Colom | 2008–2011 (Note: Sandra Torres divorced Álvaro Colom on 7 April 2011, leaving the position of First Lady vacant.) |
| — | Vacant | Álvaro Colom | 2011–2012 (Note: The position became vacant from 7 April 2011 until 14 January 2012, following the divorce of Sandra Torres and Álvaro Colom.) |
| 42 | Rosa Leal de Pérez | Otto Pérez Molina | 2012–2015 (Note: Otto Pérez Molina resigned on September 2, 2015.) |
| 43 | Ana Fagianni de Maldonado | Alejandro Maldonado | 2015–2016 |
| 44 | Patricia Marroquín | Jimmy Morales | 2016–2020 |
| — | Vacant | Alejandro Giammattei | 2020–2024 (Note: Alejandro Giammattei is divorced.) |
| 45 | Lucrecia Peinado | Bernardo Arévalo | 2024–present |

== See also ==
- Presidents of Guatemala
