= Presidential transition of Bernardo Arévalo =

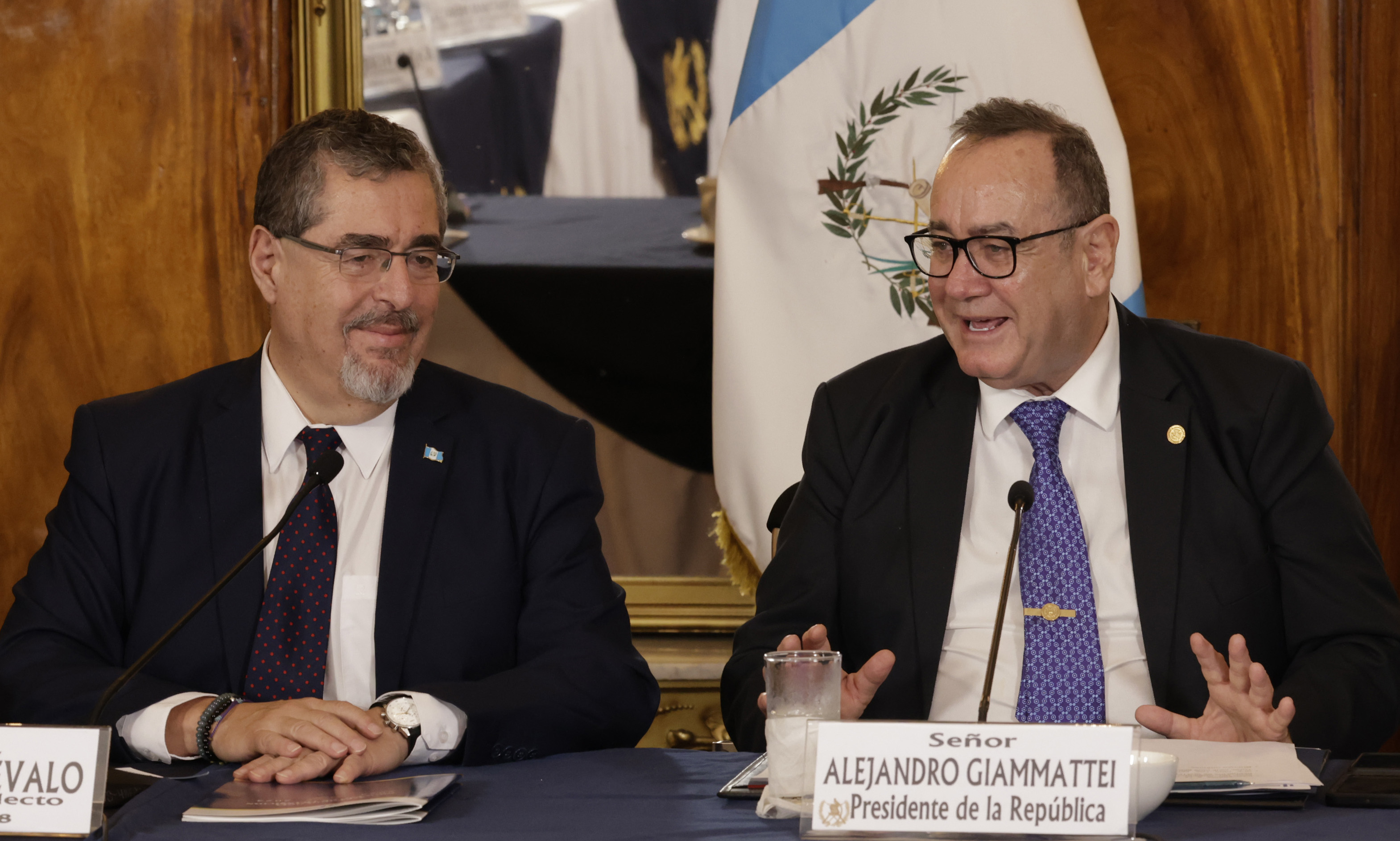
- President-elect Bernardo Arevalo (left) and president Alejandro Giammattei during their first meeting at the presidential residency
- Election date: August 20, 2023
- Transition start: September 2023
- Inauguration date: January 14–15, 2024
- President-elect: Bernardo Arévalo (Semilla)
- Vice president-elect: Karin Herrera (Semilla)
- Outgoing president: Alejandro Giammattei (Vamos)
- Outgoing vice president: Guillermo Castillo Reyes (Independent)
- Co-chairs: Karin Herrera; Alejandro Giammattei; Luis Almagro

Bernardo Arévalo, the president-elect of Guatemala, completed his transition to the presidency upon being sworn in on the 15th of January 2024. He became the candidate of Semilla in January 2020. Vice-president-elect Karin Herrera led Arévalo's transition team.

Arévalo's presidential transition has been atypical in the history of Guatemala, as the Attorney General's Office has repeatedly initiated various and controversial legal proceedings against the Semilla party, its members, Arévalo himself and the electoral process. These actions have generated widespread condemnation both nationally and internationally, since they are considered to threaten the presidential inauguration, and have been described by Arévalo and the Organization of American States as an "attempted coup d'état". His swearing-in, which was originally scheduled to take place on 14 January 2024, would instead be held minutes after midnight on 15 January 2024.

== Background issues ==
The 2023 general election were a highly controversial electoral process, which was characterized by the exclusion of leading and anti-establishment candidates such as Carlos Pineda (who, according to polls, was poised to win the first round), Thelma Cabrera and Roberto Arzú. As well as the excessive judicialization of the electoral processes throughout the registration and campaign. Although it was not the first election in which leading presidential candidates were disqualified, in 2019 general election, candidates Thelma Aldana from Semilla and Zury Ríos from Valor were unable to participate. According to InSight Crime, the exclusion of candidates is one of many recent examples of the "presence of political mafias in the current Guatemalan government, which use control of the courts to eliminate their opponents".

After Pineda's exclusion from the race, polls indicated that Edmond Mulet of Cabal was shaping up to go to the runoff with Sandra Torres of the National Unity of Hope. But Mulet began to be the subject of investigations by the Attorney General's Office, led by Rafael Curruchiche, head of the Special Prosecutor's Office against Impunity, one of the closest collaborators of Attorney General María Consuelo Porras. The results of the first round surprisingly showed that Bernardo Arévalo from Semilla had qualified to go to a second electoral round with Torres.

Shortly after the first round of elections, several establishment political parties alleged "electoral fraud" and days later, the Attorney General's Office announced an alleged corruption case involving the Semilla party and requested that its legal personality be suspended. This case was also led by Curruchiche. The headquarters of the Supreme Electoral Tribunal was raided several times, raids were also reported at the headquarters of the Semilla party. The Constitutional Court issued a legal resolution protecting the runoff. Arévalo won the elections with 61% of the votes. National Unity of Hope and Torres did not accept the electoral result and alleged electoral fraud. Later, the Attorney General's Office carried out several raids at the headquarters of the Supreme Electoral Tribunal, opening the boxes with the electoral ballots and seizing them. In one of the raids, the prosecutors were covered and mistreated the electoral magistrates. Protests in favor of Arévalo also intensified following the Supreme Court of Justice upholding the party's suspension, his supporters called for a "national strike" and blocked dozens of roads throughout the country. The 48 cantones of Totonicapán and the indigenous authorities of several communities have taken a leading role in the demonstrations, and have held a sit-in in front of the headquarters of the Attorney General's Office and have said that they will withdraw until President-elect Arévalo takes office. They have also organized several walks and have supported the president-elect's public calls.

The legal personality of the Semilla party was suspended in November 2023. In mid-November, the Attorney General's office requested that the immunity of the President-elect Arévalo and the Vice President-elect Herrera be withdrawn for allegedly participating in the takeover of the facilities of the state university, the Universidad de San Carlos de Guatemala, which occurred between April 2022 to June 2023. University professors and students, as well as members of the Semilla party, were also captured. At the same time, an investigation was initiated against officials of the Supreme Electoral Tribunal (including electoral magistrates) for alleged anomalies in the purchase of the computer system for the transmission of preliminary results and requested the withdrawal of immunity. The Supreme Court of Justice approved the process and passed it to Congress. However, the president of the Supreme Electoral Tribunal Blanca Alfaro and the substitute magistrates presented a legal appeal before the Constitutional Court to avoid the loss of their immunity. The Court accepted the appeal and stopped the procedure, while it rejected another similar legal resource presented by the other four titular magistrates. A legal process was also initiated against Vice President Guillermo Castillo, who has been estranged from President Alejandro Giammattei since 2020. The chairs of the legislative investigative commissions of the electoral magistrates and Vice President Castillo publicly denounced threats to expedite the procedure so that the plenary session can vote to withdraw the immunity of those investigated. Late at night on 27 November, Congress lifted the immunity of the four titular magistrates by a qualified majority of the pro-government coalition. Hours later, the four magistrates left the country after having requested a "leave".

On 8 December, the Attorney General's Office presented another advance in the case of the Semilla party and once again requested the removal of immunity from Arévalo and member of Congress Samuel Pérez Álvarez. Furthermore, the Attorney General's Office openly said that the Supreme Electoral Tribunal had made administrative errors during the organization of the electoral results and therefore, the electoral process was "null", and that it should be "annulled", thus confirming the intention to subvert the election results, although they denied it.

=== International reactions ===
The United States has been using the "Engel List" to sanction actors they consider key to undermining democracy. On the other hand, they sanctioned Miguel Martínez, a close ally of President Giammattei, with the Magnitsky Act. In addition, several US officials and politicians have made ongoing visits to monitor the transition process. On 8 December, at the time that the Attorney General's Office requested that the electoral process be "annulled", a bicameral Democratic group made up of Tim Kaine, Dick Durbin, Jeff Merkley, Laphonza Butler, Peter Welch, Norma Torres and Delia Ramirez was arriving in the country. Republican Senators Bill Cassidy and Marco Rubio also condemned the events in Guatemala. Department of State Spokesperson Matthew Miller announced that they imposed sanctions on more than 300 individuals, including more than 100 members of Congress and businessmen and their families.

The Organization of American States has been monitoring the situation continuously. Secretary General Luis Almagro made continuous visits to the country to supervise the transition process, he also established a mission made up of the former Minister of Defense of Uruguay Luis Rosadilla, the OAS ambassador in Guatemala Diego Paz, the diplomat Liliana Ayalde and the former Vice President of Panama Isabel Saint Malo. The ambassadors to the OAS, Josué Fiallo and Washington Abdala, from the Dominican Republic and Uruguay respectively, gained national notoriety for their passionate interventions in favor of democracy. While Almagro has been particularly critical of the attorney general's actions and has described them as a "coup d'état". Colombian Defense Minister and former head of the International Commission against Impunity in Guatemala Iván Velásquez Gómez said that the "eyes of the world must be on Guatemala".

The United Kingdom and the European Union condemned the actions of the Attorney General's office. The European Union announced that personal sanctions will be imposed on those responsible for "undermining" democracy. The United Nations and Mercosur also joined the condemnations.

A group of conservative presidents of Ibero-America (including José María Aznar, Vicente Fox and Álvaro Uribe) expressed their concern about the events and described it as a "judicial persecution" against Arévalo. The leftist Puebla Group (including Ernesto Samper and José Luis Rodríguez Zapatero) also made a statement in favor of Arévalo and called the actions in Guatemala an "anti-democratic conspiracy". A group of Ibero-American writers led by Mario Vargas Llosa, Rubén Blades and Gioconda Belli issued a statement demanding that the electoral result be respected. The Socialist International issued a statement in which they asked to respect the electoral results and supported the president-elect.

== Transition procedures ==
=== Process preparation ===
The transition began to be planned in January 2023 at the instruction of President Alejandro Giammattei.

The process consists of four phases:

- Planning: from February to April of the same year, activities were carried out for the government transition, policy evaluation, and multi-year planning workshops, with the objective of communicating guidelines to various entities.
- Draft transition reports: From May to June, the first institutional folders were formed to organize all government information.
- Meetings with sectors and second draft: from July to September, the first meetings are held with the cabinet or the president-elect's team and a second draft of the transition roadmap is made.
- Review, roadmap and final report: from October 2023 to January 2024, where the final adjustment is made and the procedure is concluded.

=== Arévalo transition process ===
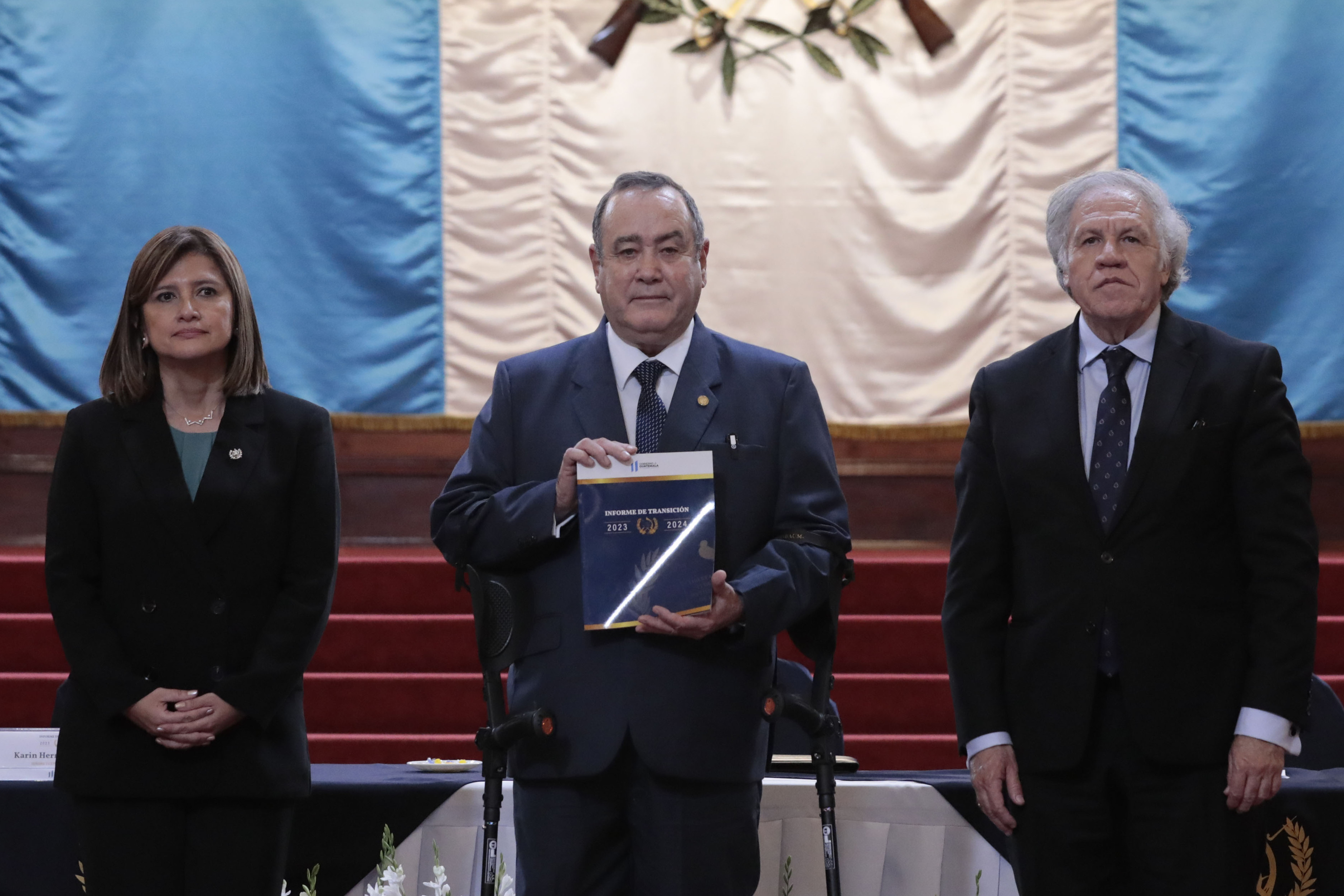
Vice President-elect Karin Herrera, President Alejandro Giammattei, and Secretary-General of the OAS Luis Almagro gathered for the final presidential transition meeting, December 2023.

On the night of the runoff, President Alejandro Giammattei congratulated Arévalo on his victory and invited him to the Presidential House to begin the presidential transition process. It was announced that the Organization of American States would be part of the transition process.

The first meeting between the outgoing president Giammattei and the president-elect Arévalo took place on 4 September at the Presidential House; the Secretary General of the OAS Luis Almagro was also present. At the meeting, Arévalo announced that he suggested modifications to the proposed timeline of the transition process. Giammattei also announced that at Almagro's suggestion, offices would be set up in all government institutions so that the president-elect's team could participate in the activities. President Giammattei chairs the transition committee, while President-elect Arévalo appointed Vice President-elect Karin Herrera as the chairwoman of the presidential transition committee. Outgoing Vice President Guillermo Castillo opted for a separate transition process and invited Vice President-elect Herrera to a series of scheduled meetings with the various cabinets in his charge.

On 11 September, a second meeting was held between Arévalo and Giammattei, with Almagro again present. This time, the meeting was held at the National Palace. Giammattei delivered the information from each government institution to the president-elect's team.

On 6 December, the final report of the presidential transition process was delivered. This time, Vice President-elect Herrera represented the incoming government, and President Giammattei presented her with the final documents. Secretary General Almagro was present. At the event, Giammattei reiterated that he would hand over power to the elected ticket, while Herrera asked Giammattei to "take into account" the requests of the elected government. On the other hand, Almagro criticized the Attorney General's office and asked that the "cannibalization of politics".

Arévalo's wife, Lucrecia Peinado, began meetings with various groups to learn about their demands. She also met with former first ladies Raquel Blandón, María Eugenia Morales and Evelyn Morataya.

== Transition team ==
On September 4, 2023, the first meeting between outgoing President Alejandro Giammattei and President-elect Bernardo Arévalo was held to define the presidential transition route, the secretary general of the Organization of American States Luis Almagro was also present, who will accompany the transfer of command until the inauguration of Arévalo in January 2024. Both Giammattei, Arévalo and Almagro announced to their team that they will be part of the transition process.

=== Giammattei's transition team ===
The outgoing government transition group is led by the President of the Republic Alejandro Giammattei. The Minister of Labor and Social Security Rafael Rodríguez Pellecer is the second in charge of the team.

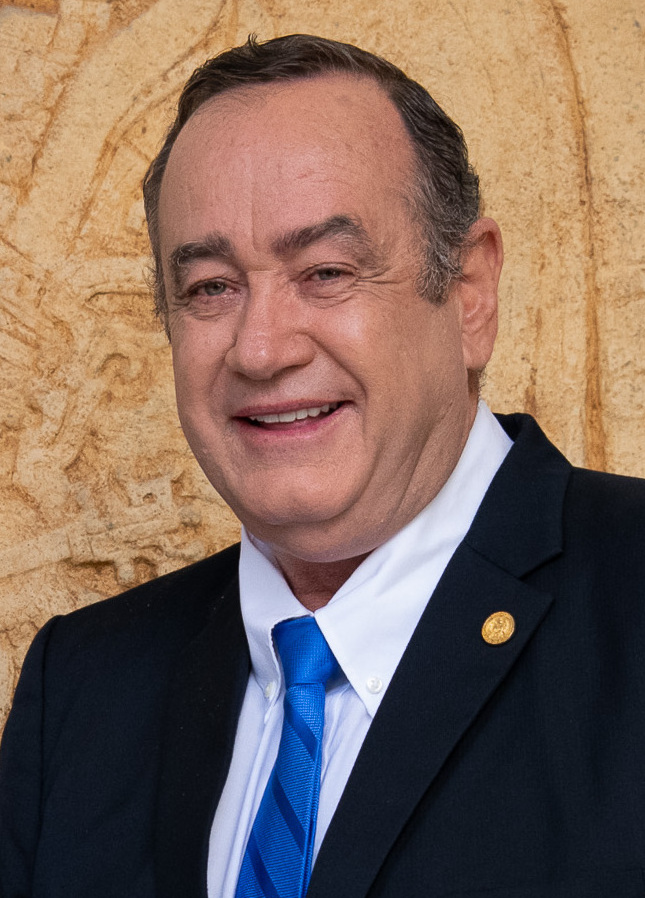
Alejandro Giammattei
President of Guatemala
Team coordinator

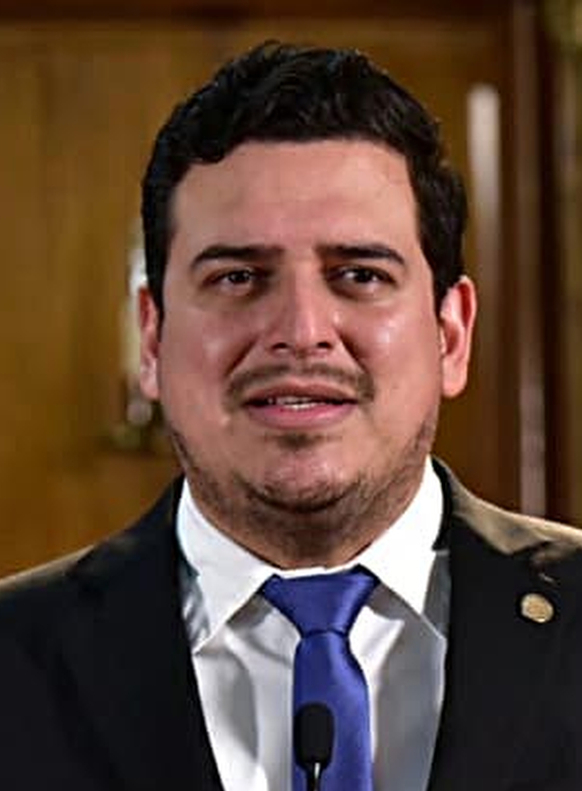
Rafael Rodríguez Pellecer
Minister of Labor and Social Welfare
Second in charge

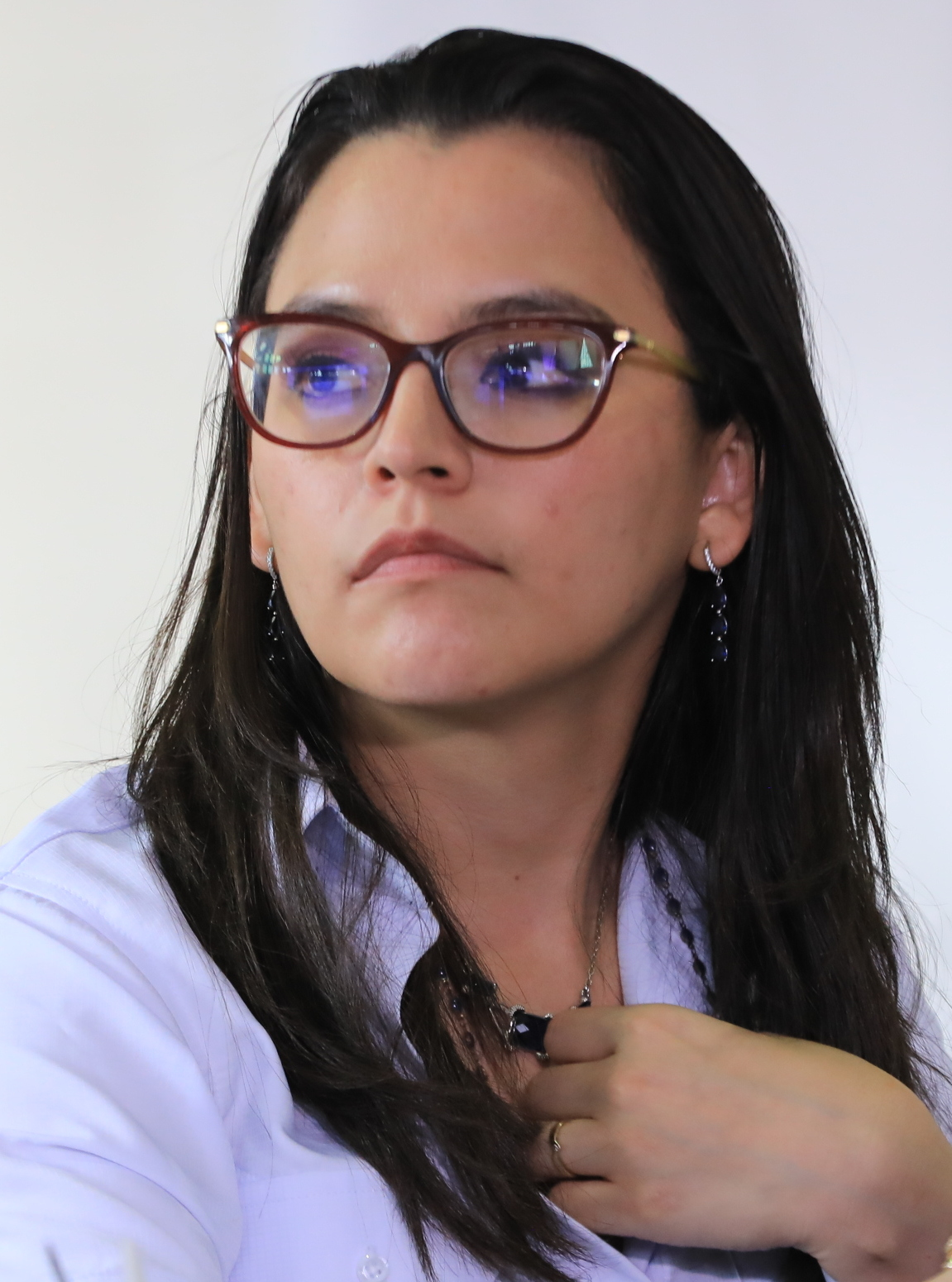
Keila Gramajo
Secretary of Planning and Programming of the Presidency
Technical coordinator

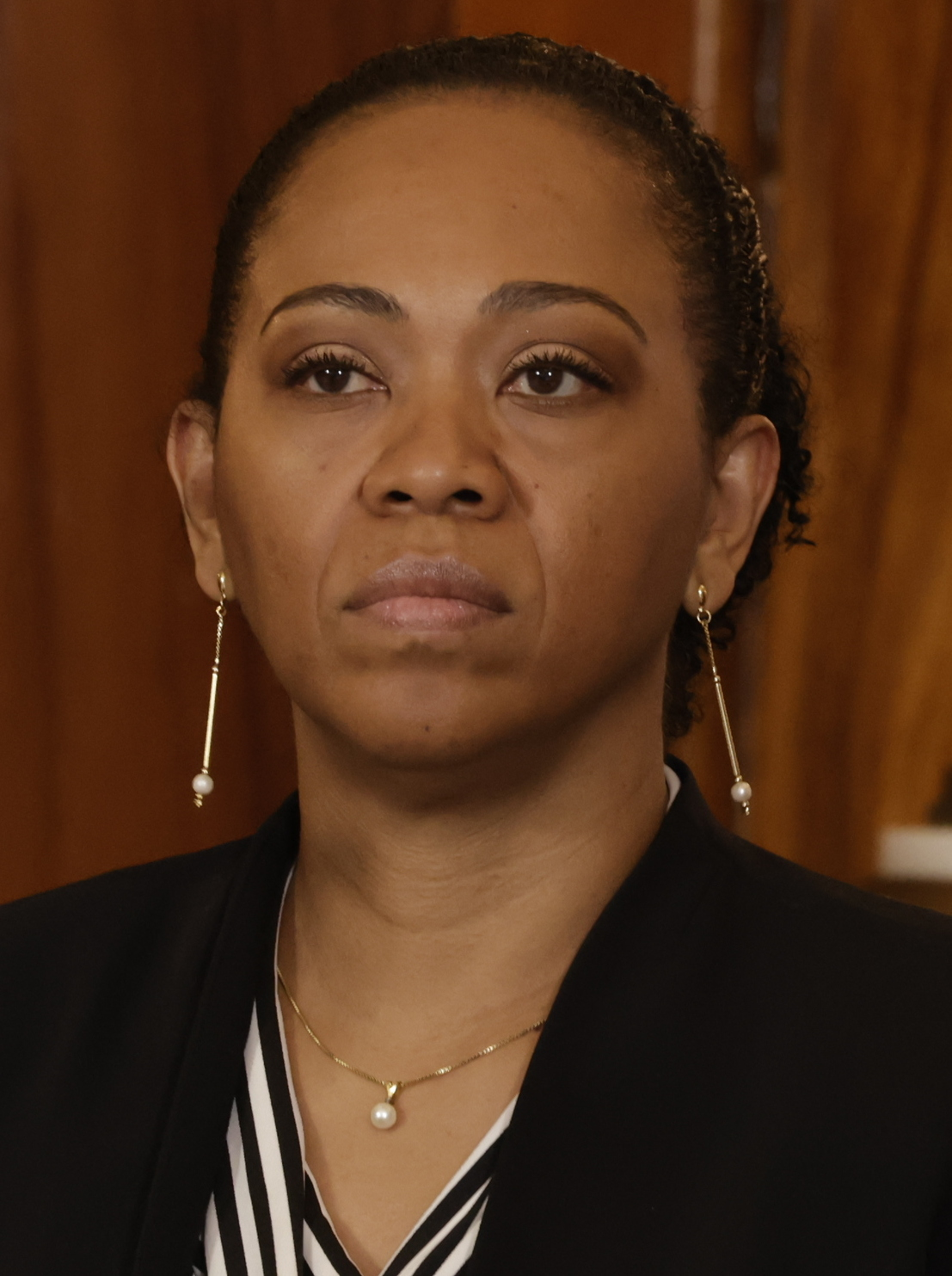
María Consuelo Ramírez
Secretary General of the Presidency
Legal advisor

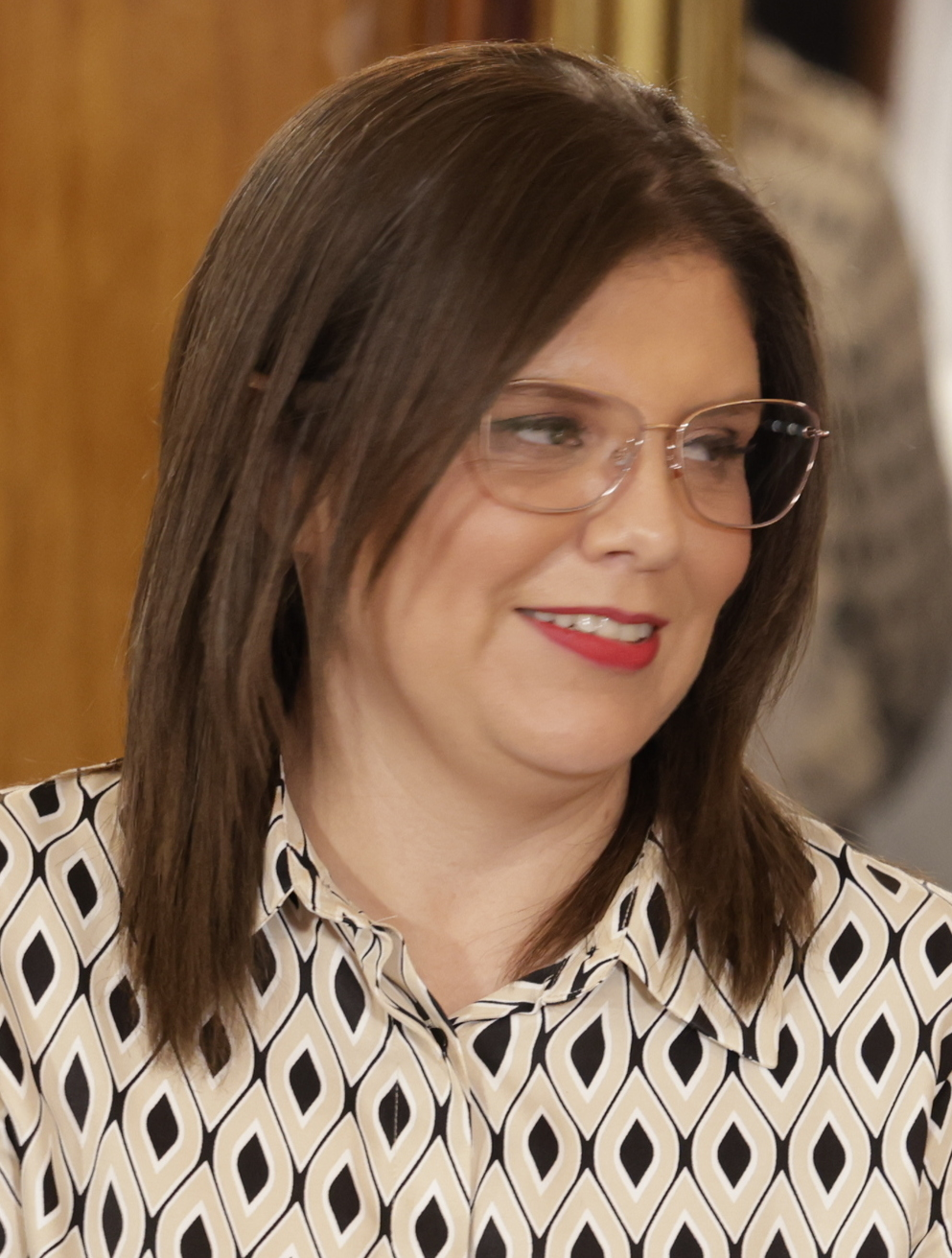
Geovanna Estrada
Private Secretary of the Presidency
Agenda coordinator

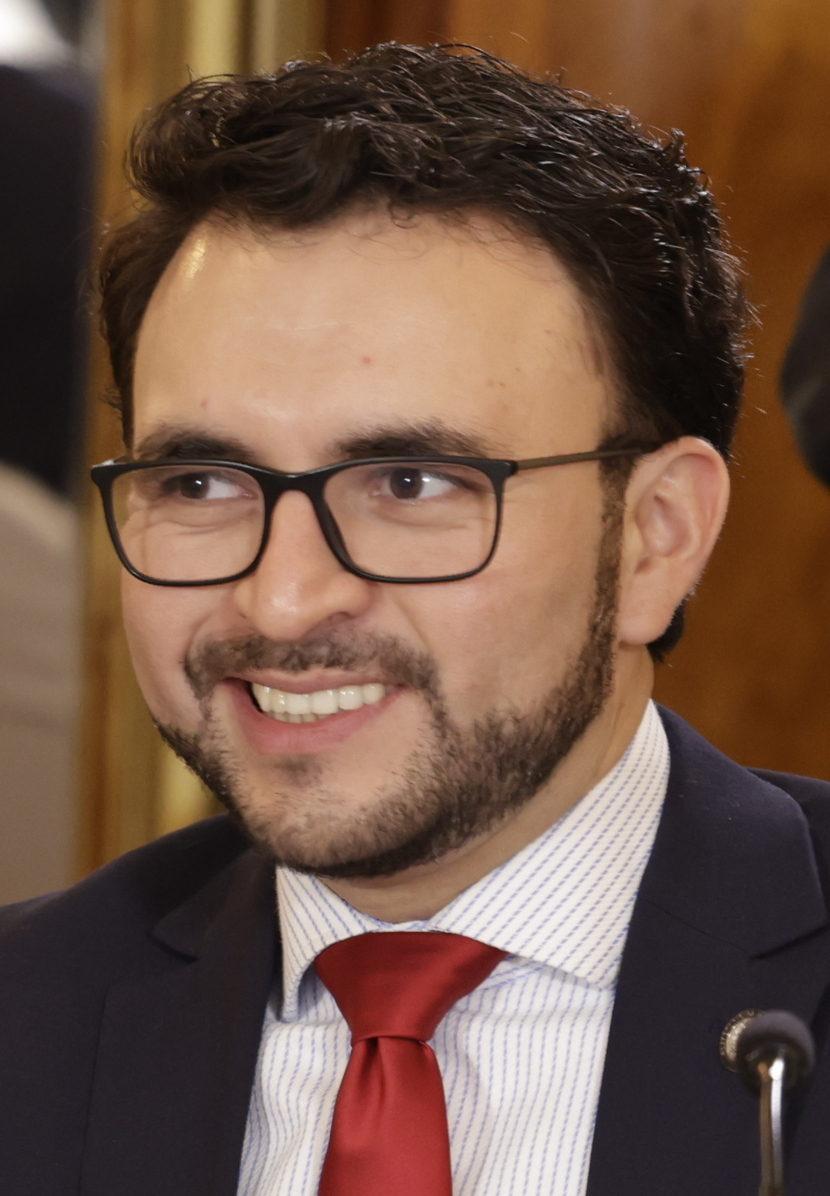
Kevin López Oliva
Secretary of Social Communication of the Presidency
Spokesperson

=== Arévalo's transition team ===
The transition group of the elected government is led by the vice president-elect of the Republic Karin Herrera.

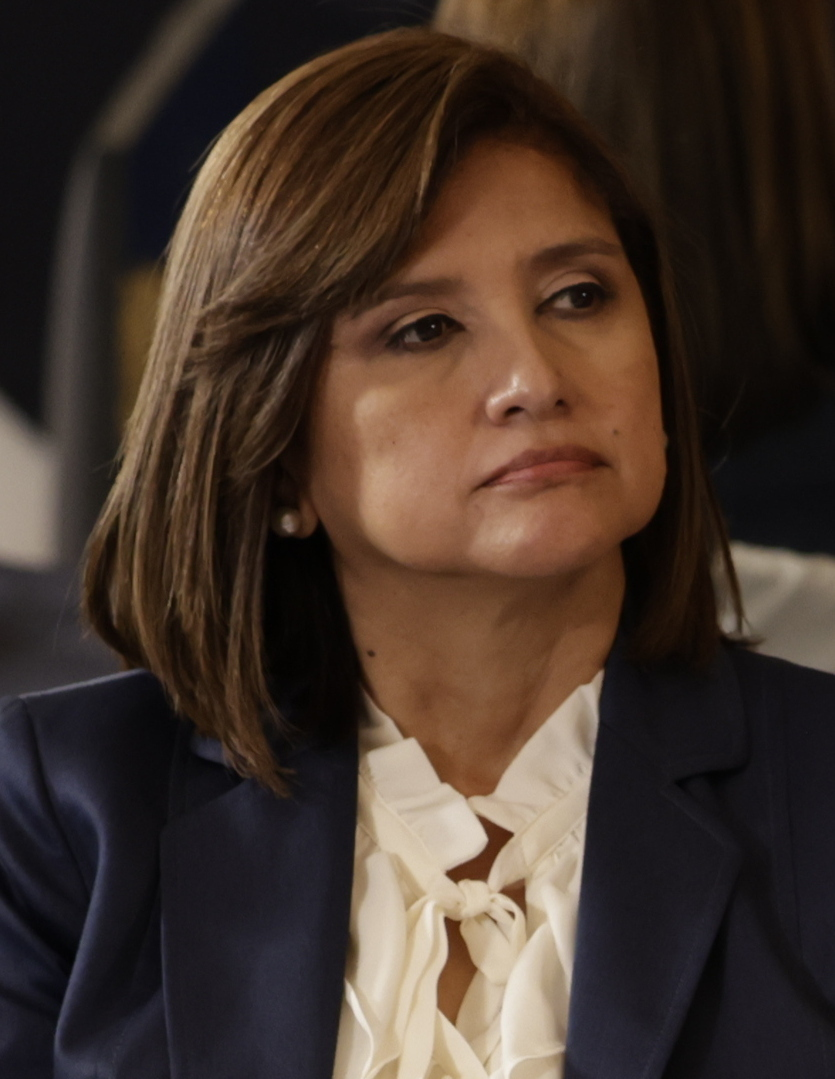
Karin Herrera
Vice-president-elect
Team coordinator

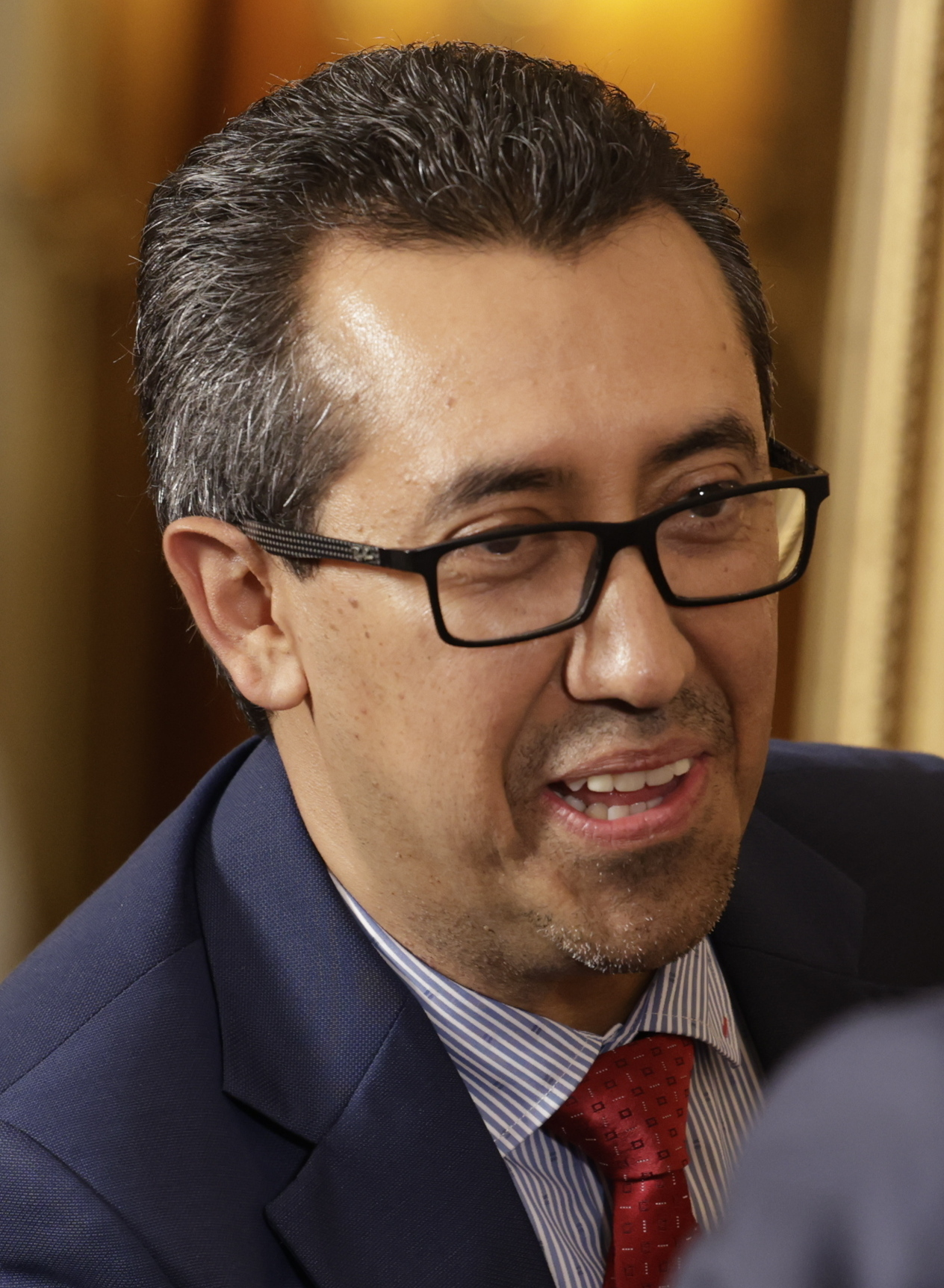
Jonathan Menkos
Deputy-elect
Economic & Financial advisor

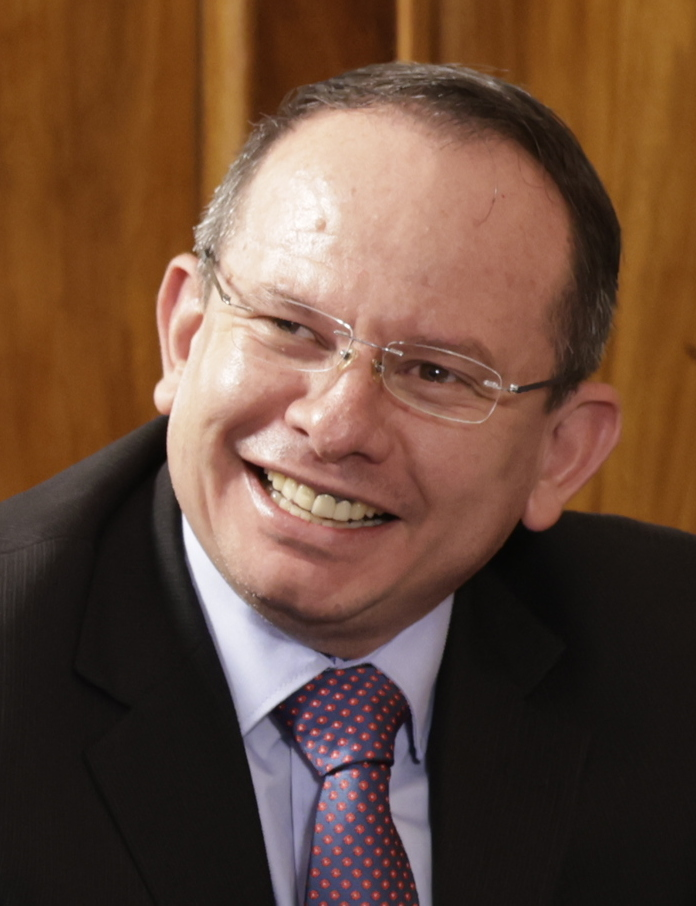
Abelardo Pinto
Advisor to the president-elect
Technical coordinator

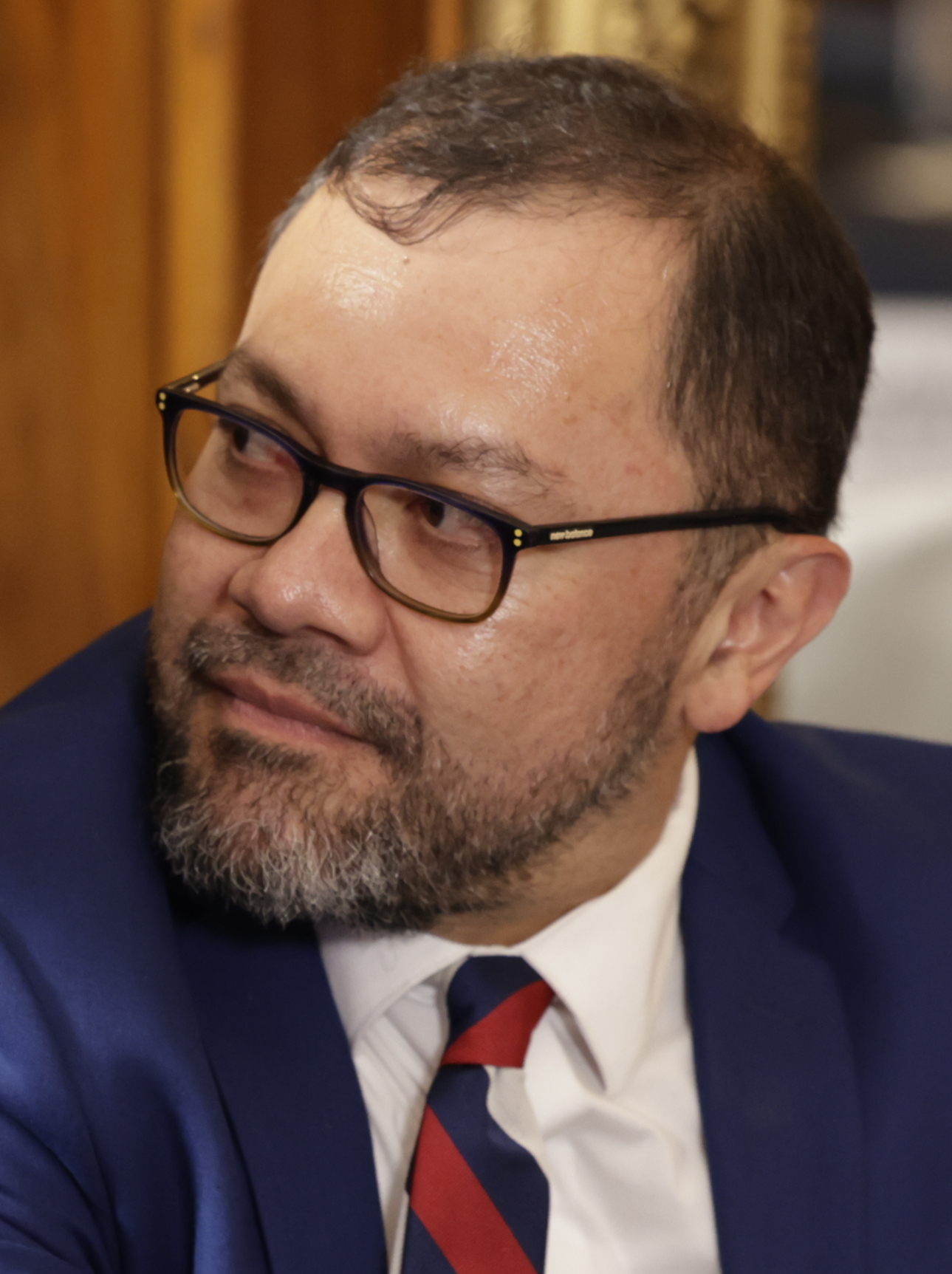
Christian Espinoza
Head Advisor of Semilla

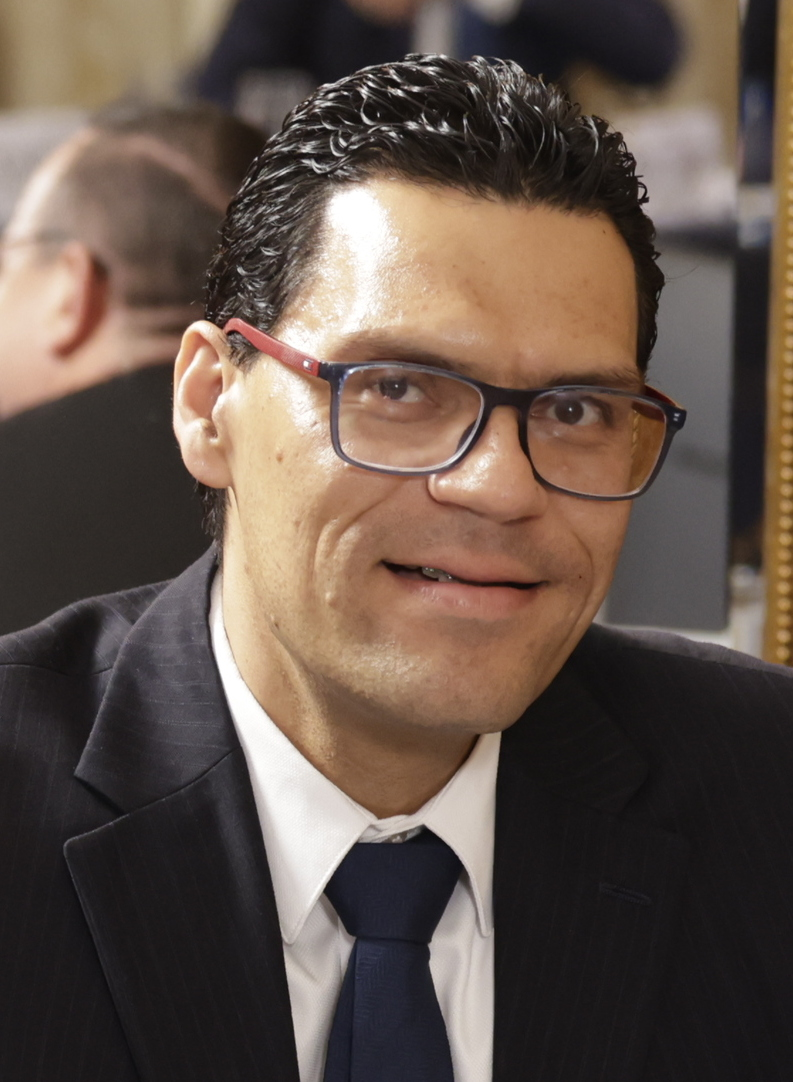
José Carlos Sanabria
Deputy-elect
Dialogue coordinator

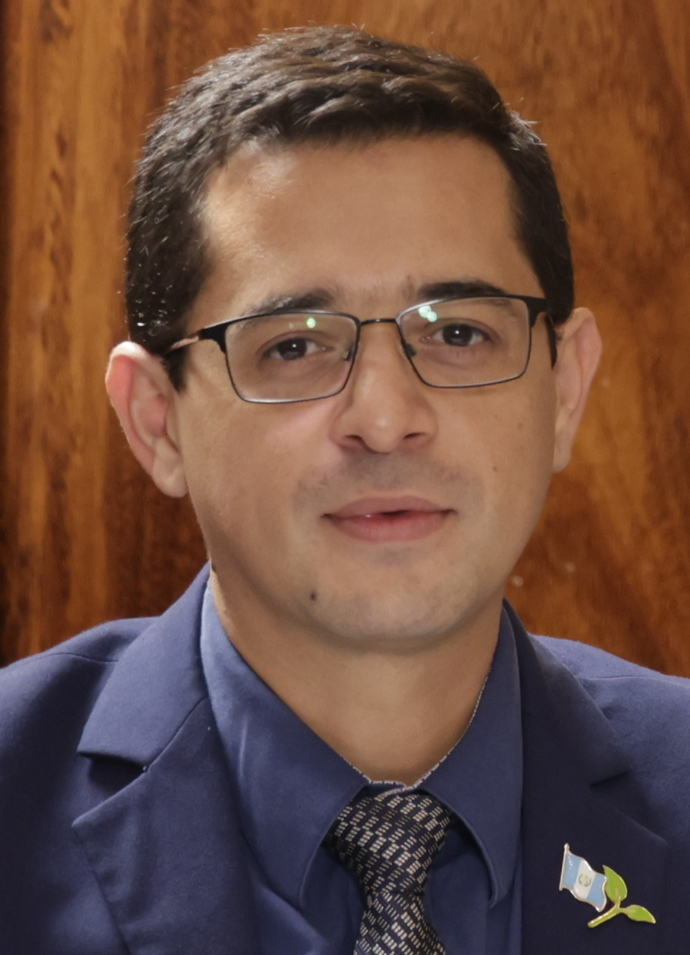
Juan Gerardo Guerrero Garnica
Member of the Central American Parliament
Legal advisor

Lourdes Hercules
Journalist
Spokesperson

=== Transition team of the Organization of American States ===
The group of the Organization of American States (OAS) that accompanies the transition process of command is led by Luis Almagro, secretary general of that organization.

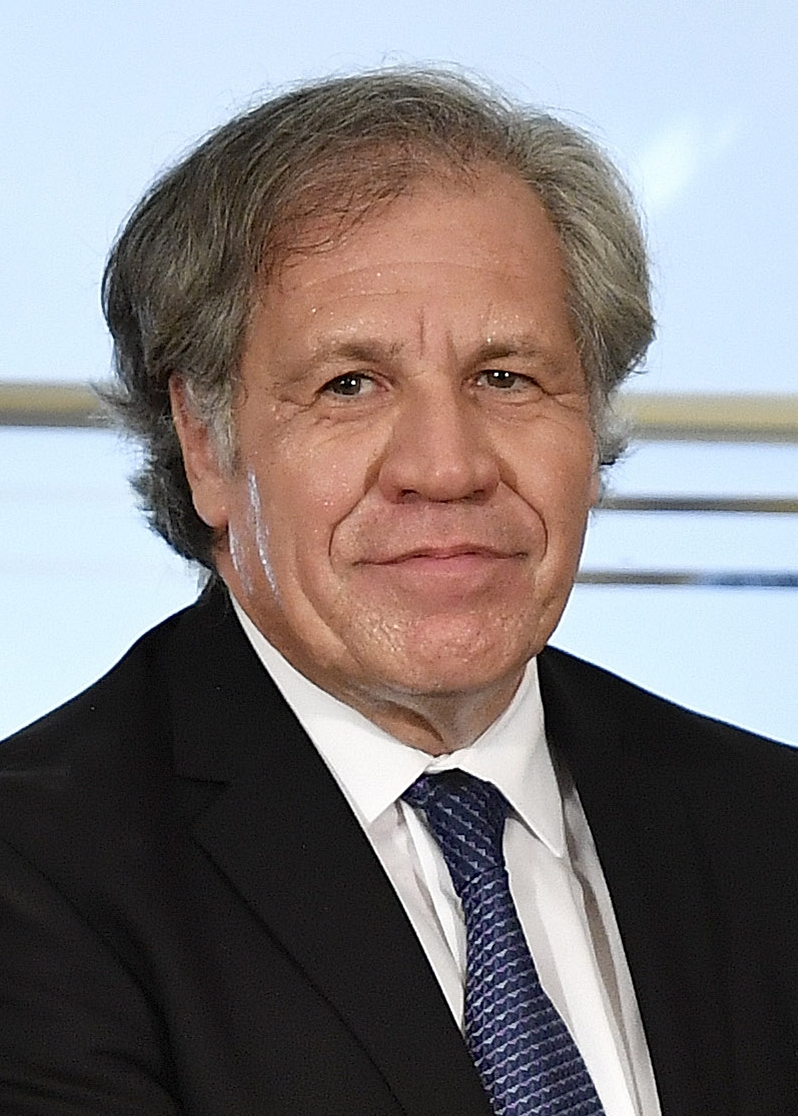
Luis Almagro
Secretary General of the OAS

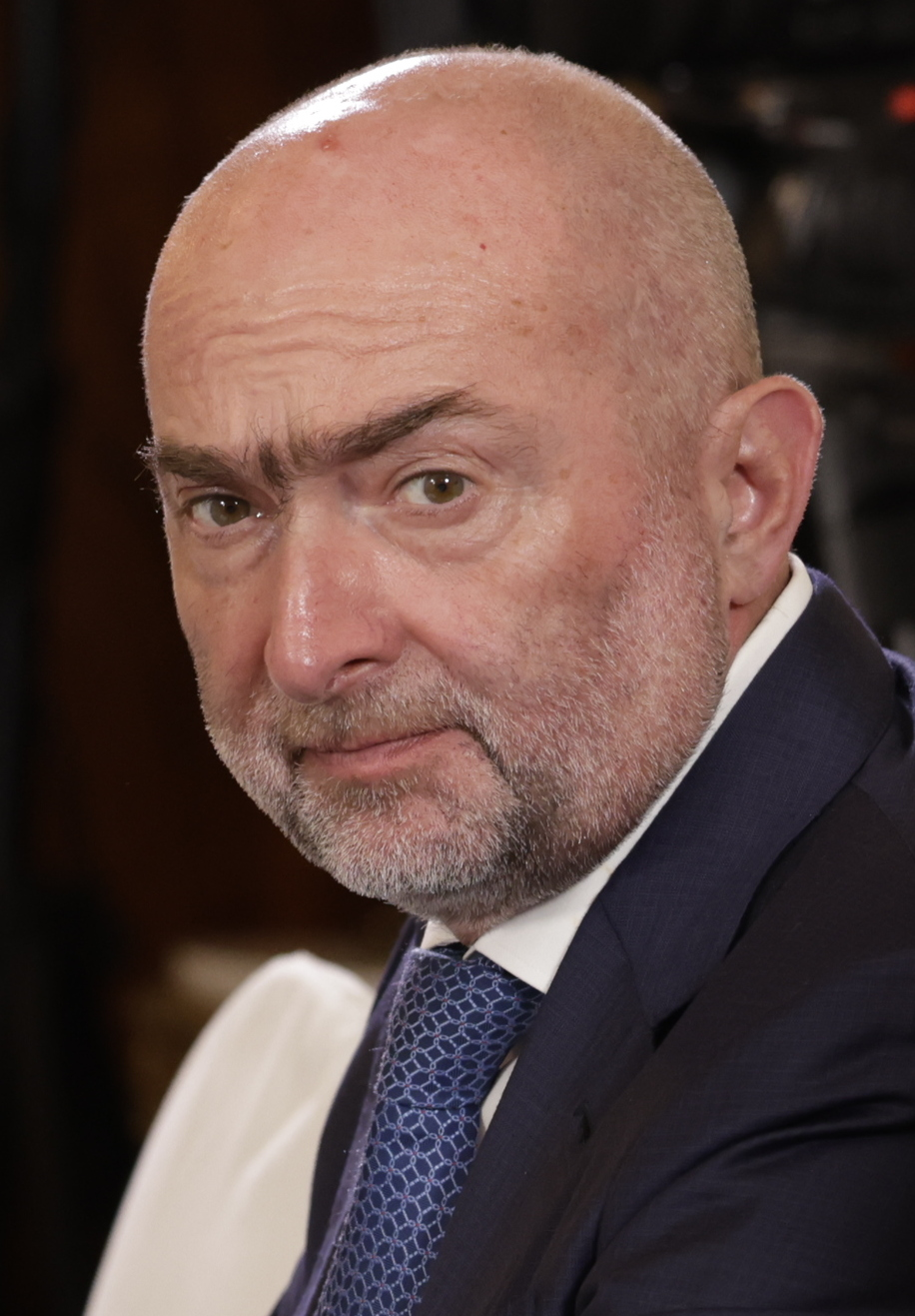
Gustavo Cinosi
Special advisor and delegate

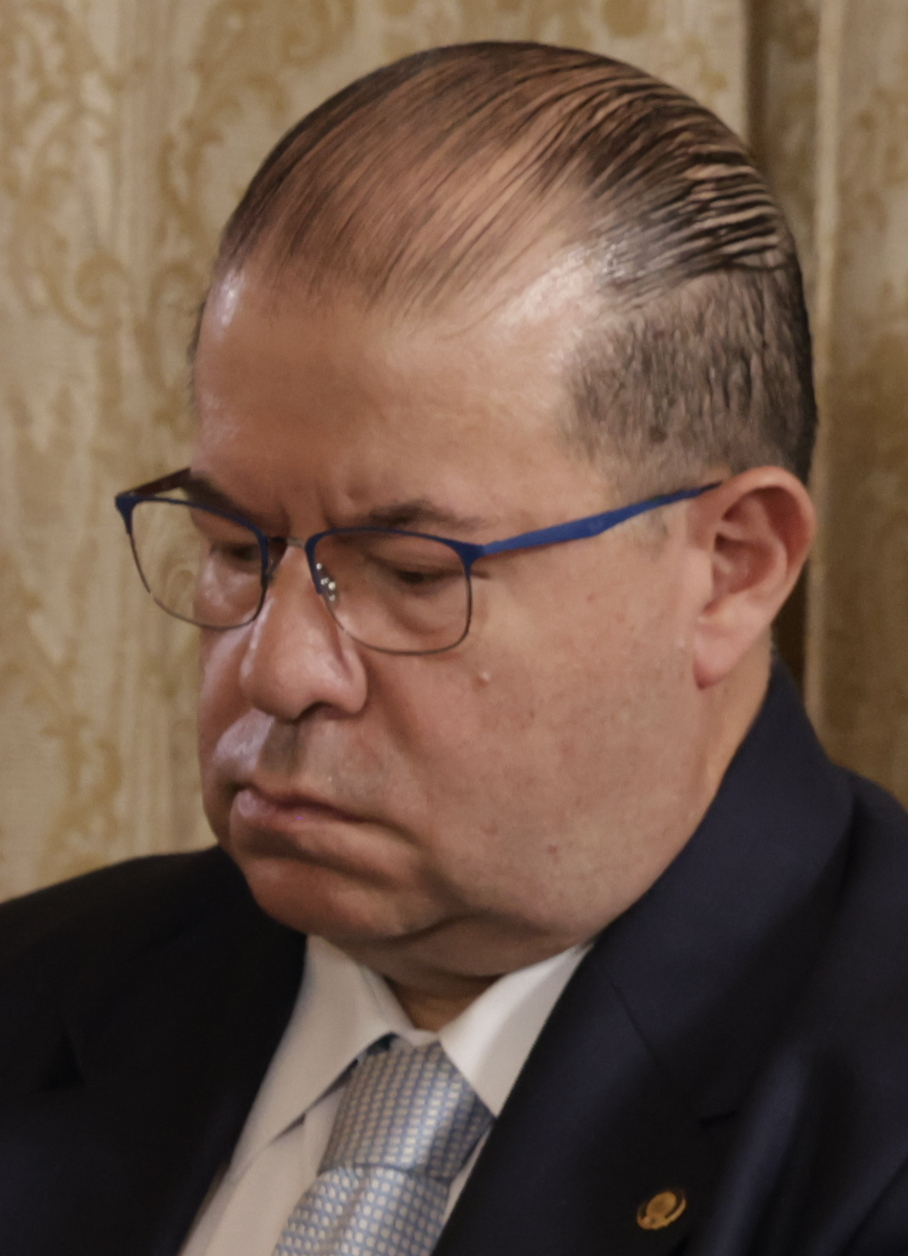
Diego Paz Bustamante

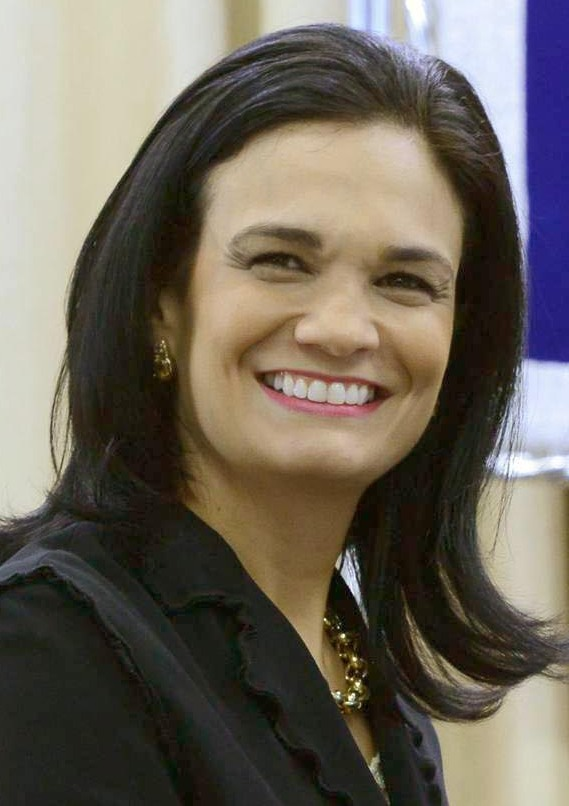
Isabel Saint Malo
Former vice-president of Panama

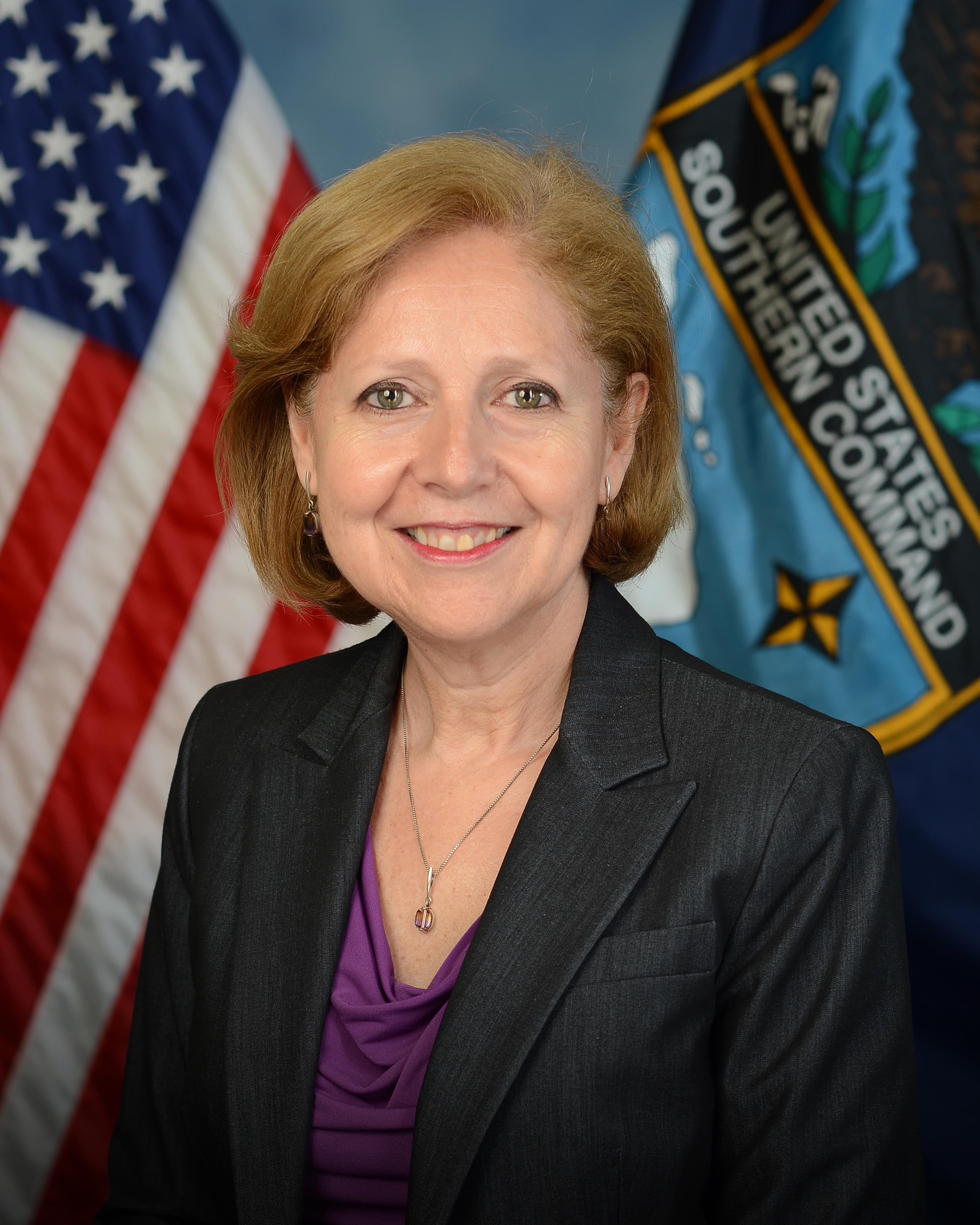
Liliana Ayalde
U.S. Ambassador

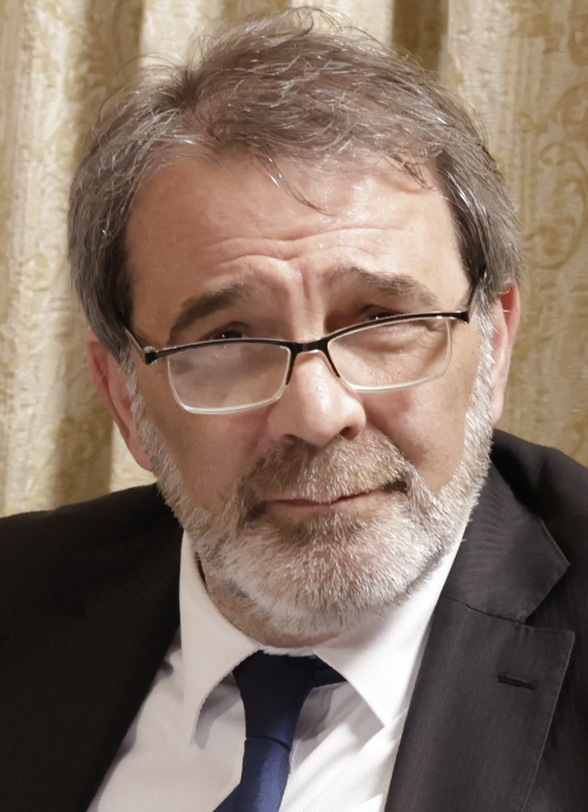
Rodolfo Camarosano

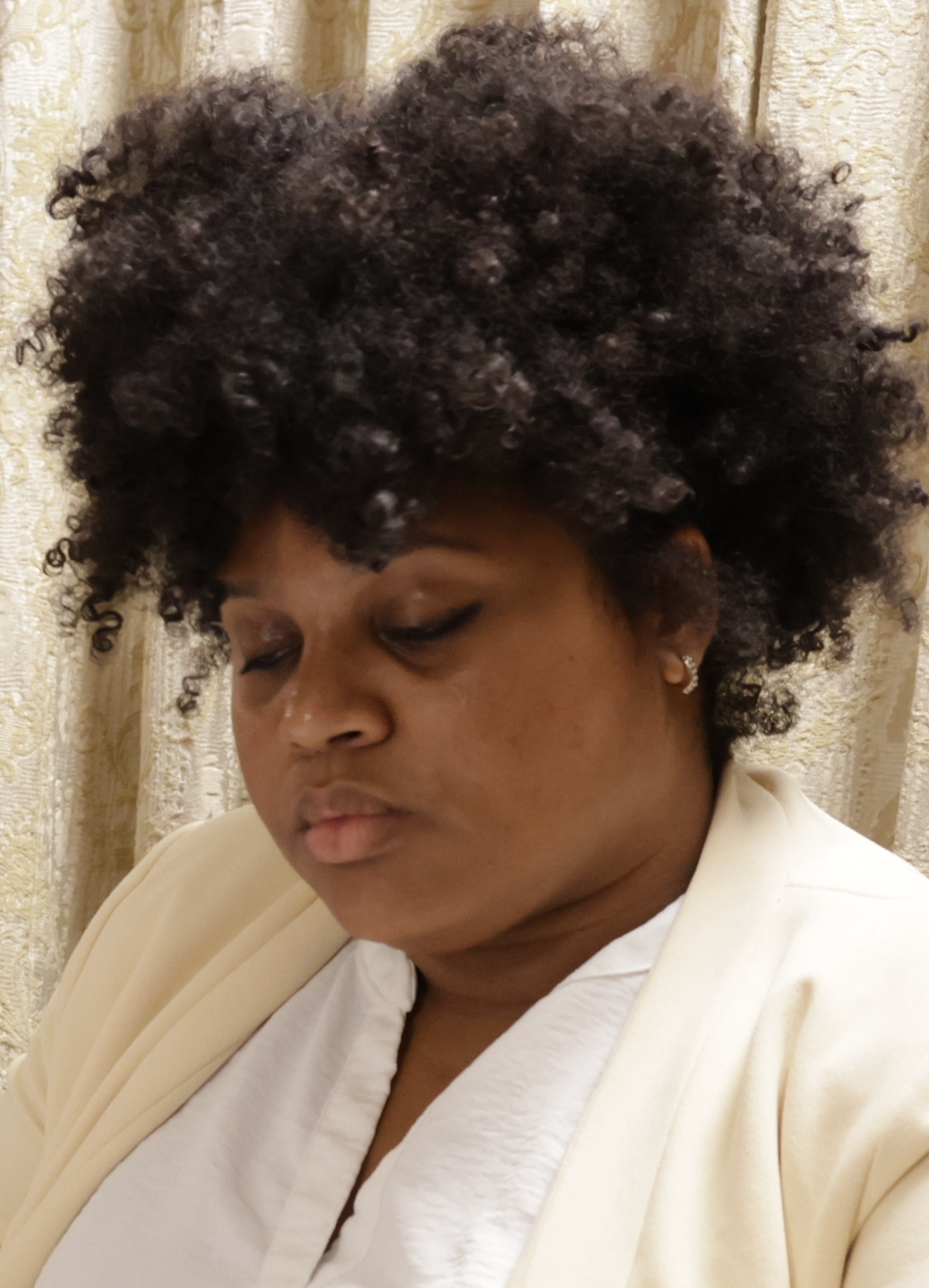
Francesca Sterling
