= Beatriz Ofelia de León =

First female president of the Supreme Court of Guatemala

President of the Supreme Court of Justice of Guatemala
- In office 2005–2006

Personal details
- Born: Beatriz Ofelia de León Reyes; 12 January 1964 (age 62) Guatemala City, Guatemala
- Profession: Lawyer, judge, academic

Beatriz Ofelia de León Reyes (born 12 January 1964) is a lawyer who served as the first female president of the Supreme Court of Guatemala (2005–2006).

== Early life and education ==
Beatriz Ofelia de León Reyes was born in Guatemala City, on 12 January 1964. Her father was Mario De León, a lawyer, and her mother was Yolanda García, a homemaker.

== Career ==
De León was president of a labor appeals court (2000–2004). She has been a professor in Labor Law in the Rafael Landivar and Mariano Gálvez universities in Guatemala.

== Siekavizza case ==
In July 2011, Roberto Barreda, Beatriz de León's son, was the main suspect in the disappearance and possible domestic violence murder of his wife, Cristina Siekavizza. It resulted in national news coverage focused on the connected issues of femicide and impunity. De León was arrested after being accused by authorities of threats and obstruction of justice. She was in pretrial detention for 17 months but didn't face trial after reaching an agreement and paying Q1,000 (Note: About 130 US dollars.) to the former Siekavizza housekeeper Olga Say Velásquez.

The trial against Barreda was expected to take place in April 2020. However, the Covid-19 pandemic prevented its realization and was later cancelled given Barreda’s death on August 6, 2020 from Covid-19.

== Legacy ==
Beatriz de León made history by being the first woman who was president of the Supreme Court of Justice of Guatemala but also by being an inmate in the high profile case in the disappearance of her daughter in law.

== See also ==
- Thelma Aldana - Second female president of the Supreme Court
- Silvia Valdés - third female president of the Supreme Court of Justice of Guatemala.
- List of the first women holders of political offices in North America
