= Silvia Valdés =

Guatemalan Supreme Court judge

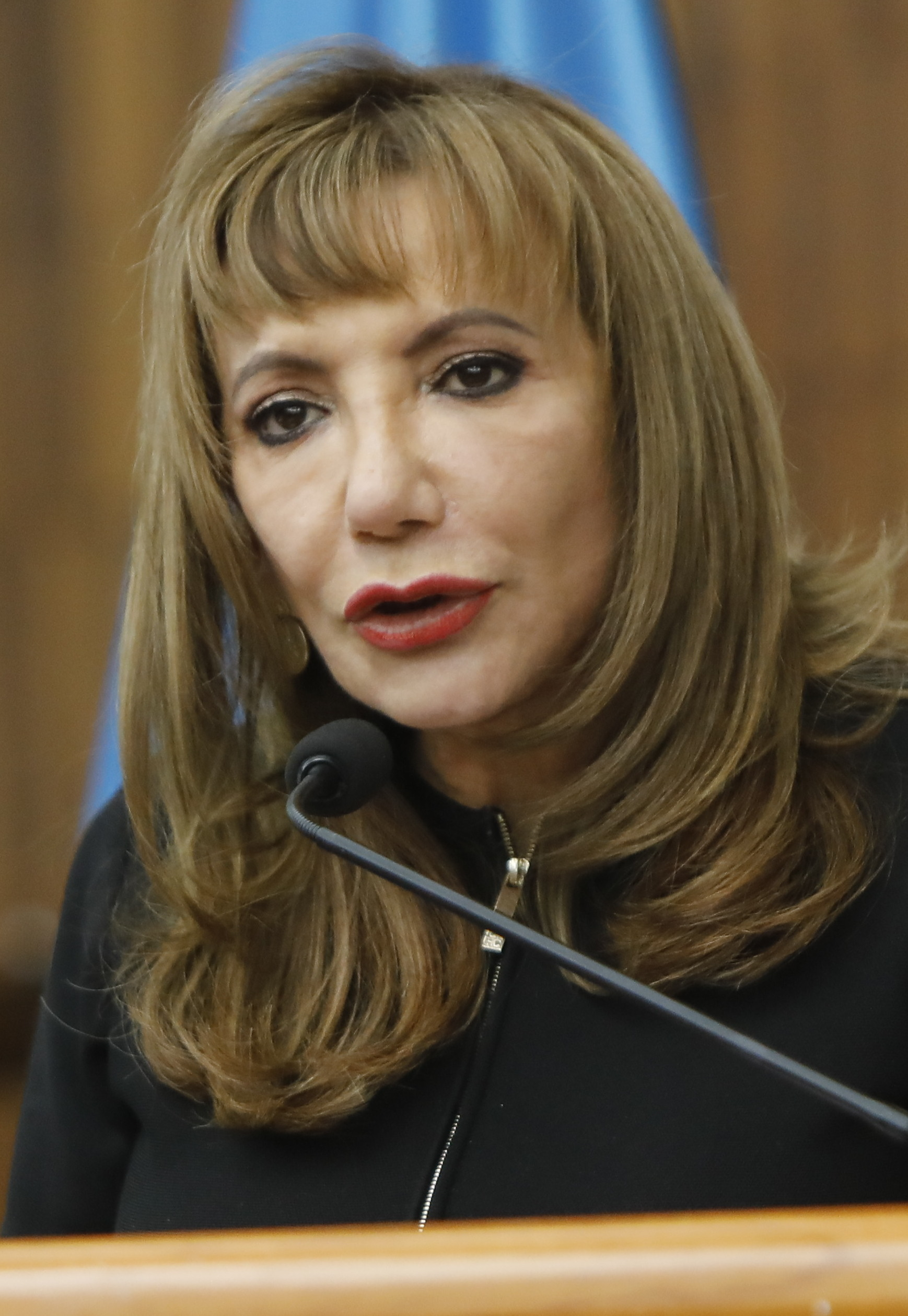
- Silvia Valdes in 2022

Chief Justice of the Supreme Court of Justice of Guatemala
- In office October 13, 2019 – November 17, 2023
- Appointed by: Supreme Court of Justice
- Preceded by: Néster Vasquez
- Succeeded by: Óscar Cruz Oliva
- In office 26 September 2016 – 9 February 2017
- Appointed by: Supreme Court of Justice
- Preceded by: Rafael Rojas
- Succeeded by: Nery Medina

Judge of the Supreme Court of Justice of Guatemala
- In office November 24, 2014 – November 17, 2023
- Nominated by: Congress of Guatemala

Judge of the Appeals Second Chamber of the Civil and Commercial Branch
- In office October 13, 2009 – November 24, 2014
- Appointed by: Congress of Guatemala

Personal details
- Born: Silvia Patricia Valdes Quezada; June 3, 1956 (age 69) Guatemala City, Guatemala.
- Education: Mariano Galvez University (Lawyer); Javeriana University (Corporate law)

Silvia Patricia Valdés Quezada (born 1953) is a lawyer who served as the third female president of the Supreme Court of Justice and the judicial branch of Guatemala, from 2019 until 2023.

== Early life and education ==
Silvia Valdés is daughter of Héctor Augusto Valdés Díaz and Dora Estela Quezada. She has a Bachelor's degree in Social and Juridical Sciences with an Attorney and Notary degree, and two doctorates in law and justice administration from the Mariano Gálvez university. She also has Master degrees in societary and procedural law from several universities.

== Career ==
She started her career as a bailiff in 1976 and later became judge. She was head of a civil court in 2000 for 9 years and later president of a civil appeals court. She was reportedly backed by the private sector and official apparatus at the time of president of the republic Otto Pérez when she was first elected magistrate of the Supreme Court (CSJ) by the Guatemalan Congress for the period 2014–2019. In 2015 there was controversy after a judge assigned for her use an impounded luxury car that was reported stolen, something that was opposed by the prosecutor's office.

=== Voided appointment, resignation, and extended presidency ===
Silvia Valdés was elected president of the Supreme Court of Justice on 26 September 2016, after Rafael Rojas ended his term. But in January 2017, the Constitutional Court of Guatemala voided her appointment of a year term because of improper procedure in the process. But given that Valdés was the first-magistrate, she was entitled to be interim president. Nery Medina was elected in her place for the top office on 9 February 2017.

On 13 June 2019—after her official term as magistrate expired—she tendered her resignation to Congress, which didn't accept it. On 13 October 2019, she was again appointed president of the Supreme Court by her peers at the same. By October 2022, the legislative body had not elected for three years magistrates for the new term, due to a series of irregularities and legal actions. Valdés and her peers continued in their positions in the Court, required by law. Although the Guatemalan Constitution provides for only a single 5-year period for the magistrates, the Constitutional Court had ruled that per Article 71 of the Law of the Judicial Organism (Spanish: Ley del Organismo Judicial), the bench needed to continue if no successors had yet been appointed.

In April 2022, the Constitutional Court stopped the possibility of investigating Valdés while in office for a corruption case. She was linked by a prosecutor's office (FECI) to a network who sought to peddle influence in the election of judicial officials.

The Department of State compiled a document known as the Engel List to point out controversial personalities in Guatemala. Valdés criticized it, stating that it violated the Guatemalan Constitution and that people are presumed innocent until found guilty in a court of law. She also said that it was an intrusion in Guatemalan internal affairs.

== See also ==
- Thelma Aldana – second female president of the Supreme Court of Guatemala
