= Juan Francisco Sandoval =

Guatemalan lawyer and prosecutor

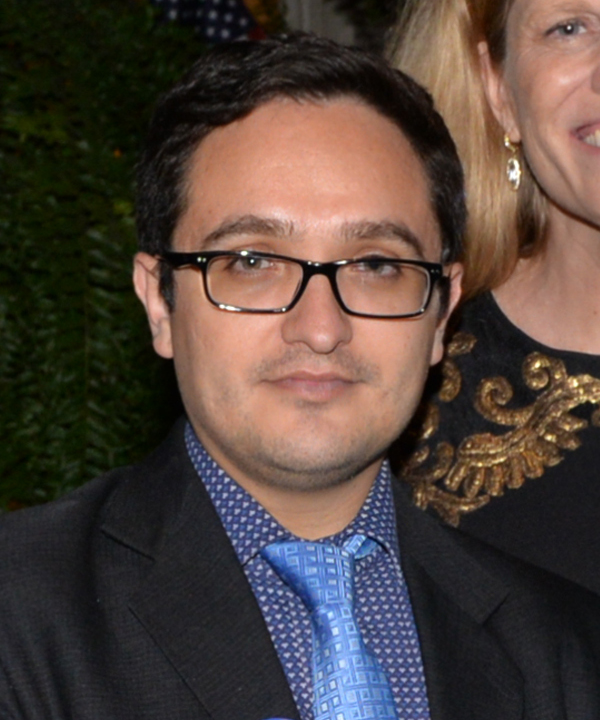
- Sandoval in 2016.

Head of the Special Prosecutor's Office against Impunity
- In office 4 September 2015 – 23 July 2021
- Attorney General: Thelma Aldana; María Consuelo Porras
- Preceded by: Óscar Schaad
- Succeeded by: Carla Isidra Valenzuela

Personal details
- Born: 5 May 1982 (age 44) Guatemala City, Guatemala
- Education: Universidad de San Carlos de Guatemala

Juan Francisco Sandoval Alfaro (born April 29, 1982) is a Guatemalan attorney and prosecutor who served as Head of the Special Prosecutor's Office against Impunity from September 2015 to July 2021.

== Biography ==
Sandoval was an ally of then-Attorney General Thelma Aldana in investigating cases against former presidents Alfonso Portillo, Álvaro Arzú, Álvaro Colom and Otto Pérez Molina, among other cases. After Aldana's mandate, Sandoval began investigations for possible corruption against former president Jimmy Morales and Alejandro Giammattei.

Sandoval maintained a strained relationship with Aldana's successor, María Consuelo Porras, who eventually ended up removing him in July 2021. According to the US State Department, Porras "actively undermined" the corruption investigations conducted by Sandoval and his team. About two months after her removal, the US Department of State included Porras on a list of "corrupt and undemocratic" officials.
