= Leopoldo Guerra =

Guatemalan judge (1954–2023)

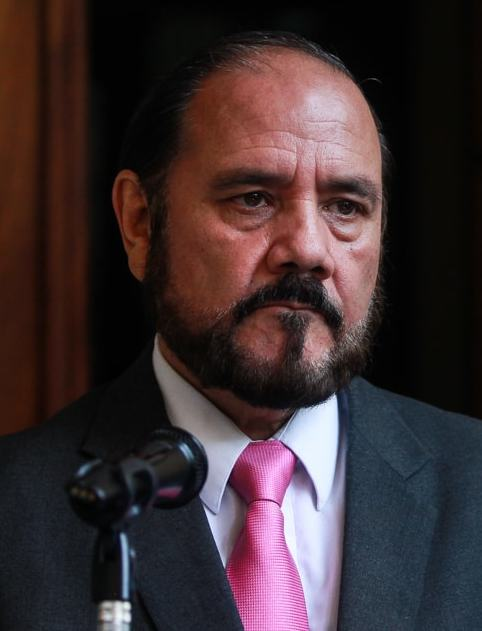

Director of the Registry of Citizens of the Supreme Electoral Tribunal
- In office November 2014 – May 2020; Acting: February – November 2014
- Preceded by: Miguel Solís Rojas
- Succeeded by: Oscar Alfonso de Paz Quintana

Personal details
- Born: Leopoldo Armando Guerra Juárez; September 16, 1954 Guatemala City, Guatemala
- Died: January 22, 2023 (aged 68) Guatemala City
- Children: 1
- Parent: Luis Armando Guerra Rodríguez

Leopoldo Armando Guerra Juárez (Spanish pronunciation: [leoˈpoldo aɾˈmando ˈɣera ˈxwaɾes]; September 16, 1954 – January, 22, 2023) was a Guatemalan public official and lawyer. He was the Director of the Registry of Citizens of the Supreme Electoral Tribunal of Guatemala since 2014 until 2020.

== Biography ==
He graduated from law at Mariano Gálvez University in October 1984, doing a thesis titled in Spanish: Los Problemas Laborales que Produce el Rápido Crecimiento Demográfico (English: The Labor Problems Caused by Rapid Population Growth). Leopoldo Guerra studied a specialization in criminal law at Harvard University. After that, he obtained a position as judge in the Judicial Branch, and was a judge of the Appeals Chamber for 35 years. Guerra was also a defense lawyer for soldiers accused of crimes against humanity committed during the Civil War.

He was hired by the Supreme Electoral Tribunal in 2007 as an adviser to the legal area, and in 2014 he was appointed Director of the Citizens Registry by magistrate María Eugenia Villagrán. In 2019 he was questioned by the National Convergence Front and National Unity of Hope deputies to press and request legal information on the presidential candidacy of Thelma Aldana. However, on March 27, 2019, he requested precautionary measures before the Inter-American Court of Human Rights for threats generated by far-right groups, having registered Thelma Aldana as a presidential candidate.

=== Death ===
On January 23, 2023, the Supreme Electoral Tribunal of Guatemala, through an obituary, announced his death due to health problems. No further details were released about the death or subsequent activities for the funeral.
