= María Consuelo Porras =

Guatemalan lawyer (born 1953)

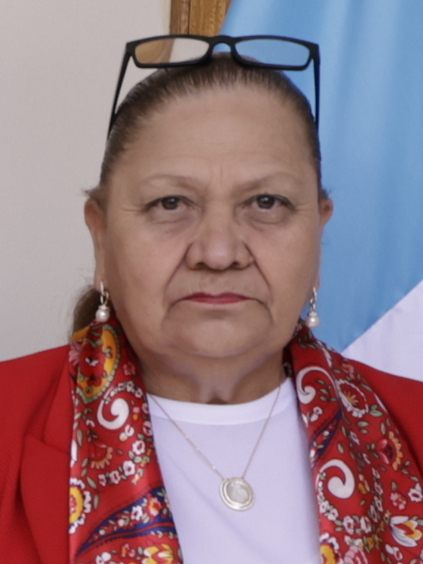
- Porras in 2023

Attorney General of Guatemala
- In office May 17, 2018 – May 16, 2026
- President: Jimmy Morales; Alejandro Giammattei; Bernardo Arévalo
- Preceded by: Thelma Aldana
- Succeeded by: Gabriel García Luna

Deputy Magistrate of the Constitutional Court
- In office April 14, 2016 – May 10, 2018
- Nominated by: Supreme Court of Justice
- Preceded by: Carmen María Gutiérrez Sole
- Succeeded by: Vacant

Personal details
- Born: María Consuelo Porras Argueta; August 23, 1953 (age 73) San Juan Comalapa, Guatemala
- Party: Independent
- Spouse: Gilberto de Jesús Porres de Paz (m. 1991)
- Education: Universidad de San Carlos de Guatemala

María Consuelo Porras Argueta (born August 23, 1953) is a Guatemalan attorney who served as the attorney general of Guatemala from 2018 to 2026. She previously served as Deputy Magistrate of the Constitutional Court from 2016 to 2018. President Jimmy Morales nominated Porras as the new Attorney General and Chief of the Public Prosecutor's Office in May 2018, succeeding Thelma Aldana.

Porras' tenure has been criticized for its backsliding in the fight against corruption.

Porras maintained a strained relationship with the Head of the Special Prosecutor's Office against Impunity, Juan Francisco Sandoval, finally dismissing him in July 2021. In September 2021 the United States Department of State announced that it had added Porras and five judges from El Salvador to a list of "undemocratic and corrupt" officials. According to the US State Department, Porras "actively undermined" the corruption investigations conducted by Sandoval and his team.

In December 2023, the Organization of American States called Porras' actions to annul the election of Bernardo Arévalo "an attempted coup d’état." In late December 2023, the Organized Crime and Corruption Reporting Project named Porras the "2023 Person of the Year in Organized Crime and Corruption," for acting "as an efficient instrument used by the government to eviscerate the rule of law" in attempts to prevent Arévalo from assuming office, as well as other actions encouraging democratic backsliding. She was the first female recipient of the award.

After Arévalo's inauguration in January 2024, he demanded Porras' resignation, which she refused.

On February 2, 2024, she was sanctioned by the European Union, making her subject to a travel ban and asset freeze in all 27 EU member states. The decision was taken as a result of her persistent attempts to overturn the outcome of the 2023 Guatemalan elections and use of her office to initiate proceedings against journalists, activists and independent prosecutors and judges. In the same month, Canada also imposed sanctions against Porras for her role in the 2023 election. In 2025, the United Kingdom sanctioned Porras.

Legal offices
Preceded by Thelma Aldana	Attorney General of Guatemala; 2018–present	Incumbent
Preceded by Carmen María Gutiérrez Sole	Deputy Magistrate of the Constitutional Court for Supreme Court of Justice; 2016–2018	Succeeded by Vacant
