= Roberto Molina =

Roberto Molina may refer to:

- Roberto Molina (sailor) (born 1960), Spanish sailor
- Roberto Molina (footballer, born 1971), Argentine footballer
- Roberto Molina (footballer, born 2001), Salvadoran footballer
- Roberto Molina Barreto (born 1955), Guatemalan lawyer and politician
