= Attorney General of Guatemala =

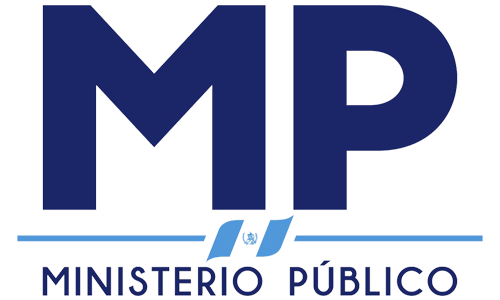

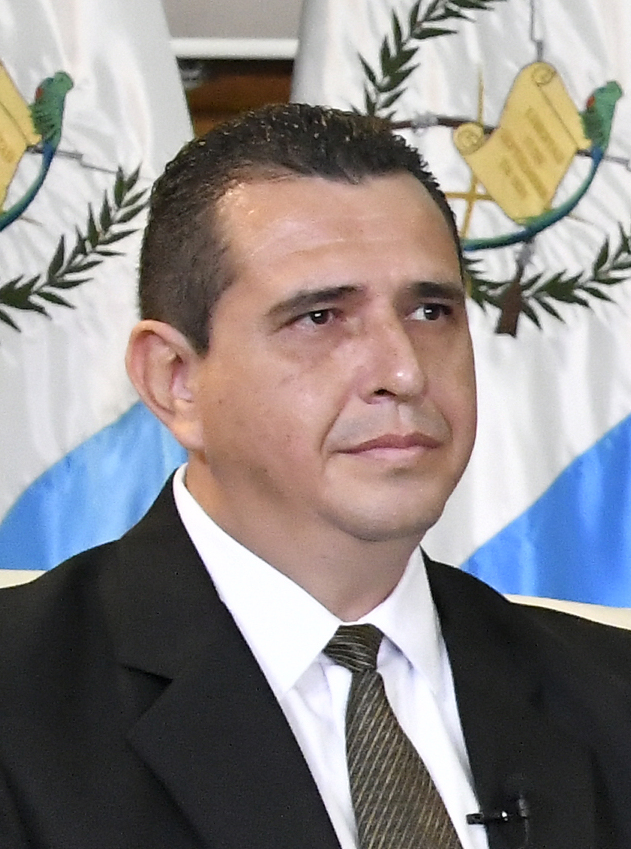
- Incumbent; Gabriel García Luna since 17 May 2026
- Style: Mister/Madam Attorney General (informal); The Honorable (formal)
- Appointer: The president of Guatemala
- Term length: Four years
- Inaugural holder: Rámses Cuestas Gómez
- Formation: 15 May 1996

The attorney general of Guatemala (fiscal general de la República de Guatemala) is the chief public prosecutor and head of the Ministerio Público (Department of Justice) of Guatemala.

According to article 251 of the Constitution of Guatemala, the attorney general is selected by the president from a pool of six candidates who must be lawyers and must have the same qualifications as the magistrates of the Supreme Court. They are nominated by a commission conformed by the chief justice of the Supreme Court, the deans of the law schools of the country's universities, and both the chairman of the bar association and of its honor tribunal.

The attorney general has a term of four years and has the same immunity as the magistrates of the Supreme Court. The president can remove the official only due to a justified reason properly established. This reason according to article 14 of the Organic Law of the Ministerio Público is conviction of the attorney general for committing a crime during the exercise of their functions.

== List of attorneys general ==
| No. | Name | Image | Term | Notes |
|---|---|---|---|---|
| 1 | Rámses Cuestas Gómez | | May 15, 1994 – March 14, 1996 | Appointed by President Ramiro de León Carpio; Guatemala's first Attorney General. |
| * | Héctor Hugo Pérez Aguilera | | March 15, 1996 – May 14, 1998 | Interim Attorney General named by President Álvaro Arzú. |
| 2 | Adolfo González Rodas | | May 15, 1998 – May 17, 2002 | Appointed. |
| 3 | Carlos David de León Argueta | | May 18, 2002 – February 25, 2004 | Appointed and later removed by President Óscar Berger. |
| 4 | Juan Luis Florido Solís | | February 26, 2004 – July 30, 2008 | Interim and later appointed. Presented his resignation to President Álvaro Colom. |
| 5 | José Amílcar Velásquez Zárate | | July 31, 2008 – May 14, 2010 | Interim and later appointed. |
| * | María Encarnación Mejía García de Contreras | | May 15, 2010 – May 25, 2010 | Interim; first female Attorney General. |
| * | Conrado Arnulfo Reyes Sagastume | | May 25, 2010 – June 10, 2010 | Removed by the Constitutional Court. |
| * | María Encarnación Mejía García de Contreras | | June 11, 2010 – December 9, 2010 | Interim (second term as Interim Attorney General). |
| 6 | Claudia Paz y Paz Bailey | | December 9, 2010 – May 17, 2014 | Appointed; first female (non-interim) Attorney General. Nominated for Nobel Peace Prize while in office as minister of justice in 2013. |
| 7 | Thelma Aldana Hernández de López | | May 17, 2014 – May 17, 2018 | |
| 8 | María Consuelo Porras Argueta de Porres | | May 17, 2018 – May 16, 2026 | |
| 9 | Gabriel Estuardo García Luna | | May 17, 2026 – present | |

== See also ==
- Justice ministry
- Politics of Guatemala
