= Claudia Paz y Paz =

Guatemalan lawyer

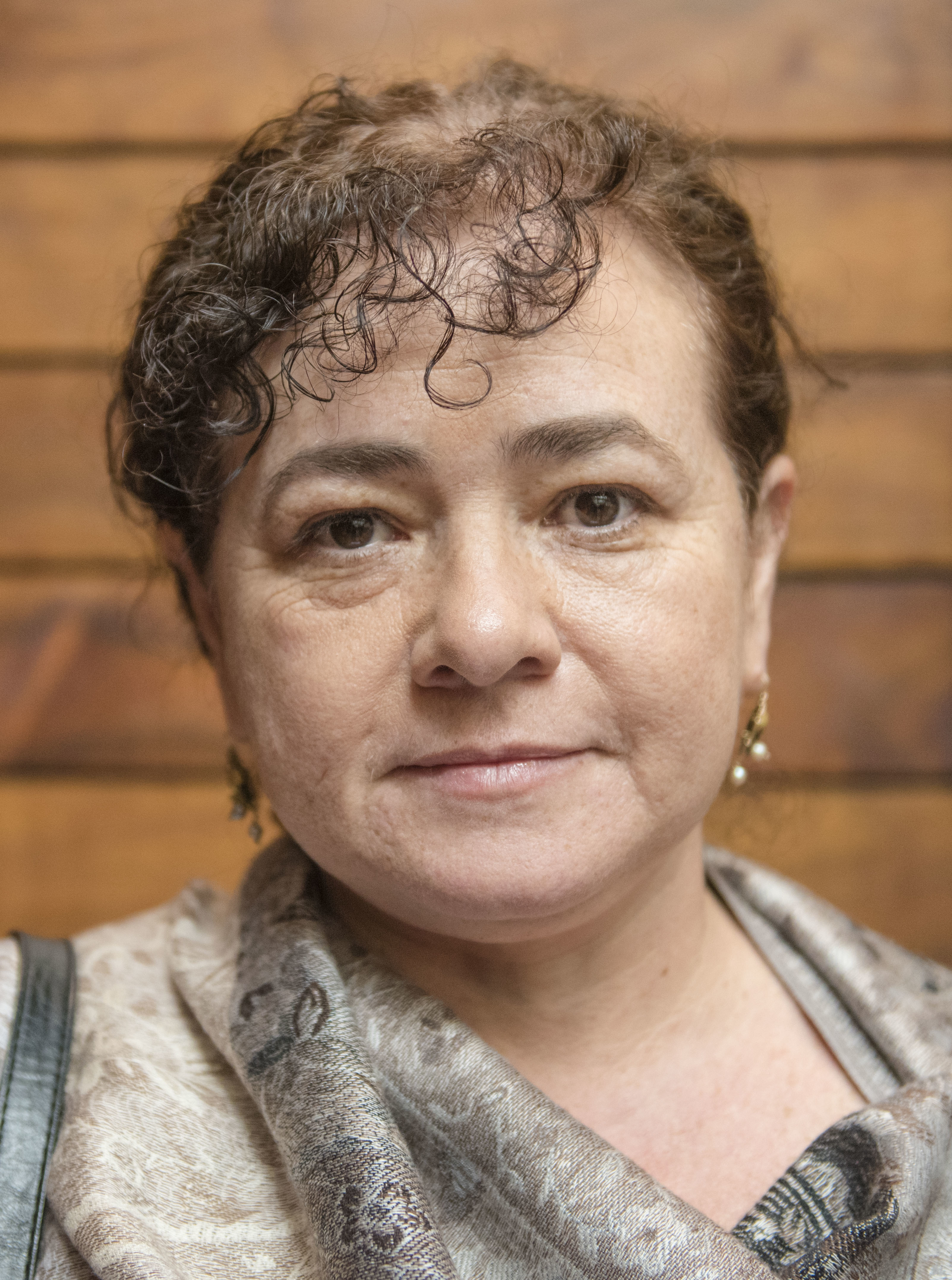

Attorney General of Guatemala
- In office 9 December 2010 – 17 May 2014
- President: Álvaro Colom; Otto Pérez Molina
- Preceded by: María Mejía García (interim)
- Succeeded by: Thelma Aldana

Personal details
- Born: ca. 1966

Claudia Paz y Paz Bailey (born 1966) is a Guatemalan attorney who served as the first female attorney general of Guatemala, from 2010 to 2014. A former judge and litigator, Paz y Paz made unprecedented strides in the prosecution of organized crime, corruption, and human rights violations.

== Career ==
Paz y Paz has been praised for her aggressive prosecution of organized crime in Guatemala (resulting in a 9% drop in crime) and has subsequently received numerous threats against her life. She is also noted for her prosecution of human rights abuses, including high-profile cases against former president Efraín Ríos Montt, indicted for genocide in January, 2012, and against the perpetrators of the Dos Erres massacre, committed during the latter's dictatorship. In her tenure as attorney general, Paz y Paz has earned a reputation as the most impassioned prosecutor Central America has seen since the war's end in the mid-1990s. She is the first-ever Guatemalan law enforcement official to have brought to justice prominent human rights abusers from Guatemala's civil war era.

Throughout the remainder of her term, Claudia Paz y Paz has set numerous records. More drug traffickers were arrested in the first six months of her term than in the previous decade. Under her leadership, five of Guatemala's 10 most wanted criminals were caught, and 10 times more cases of violence against women and of homicide were resolved than in any previous administration. "Claudia Paz y Paz has been a savior for Guatemala. We have seen sentences that we thought were never before possible in our country," said Blanca Hernández, a human rights advocate whose son was detained by security forces and never seen by his family again. "Now Rios Montt faces genocide charges. Her work has been incredible."

Paz y Paz is currently an active member of the Justice Leadership Initiative. She is also a senior fellow at the Washington Office on Latin America (WOLA). Paz y Paz is also a recipient of the WOLA 2014 Human Rights Award, which honors organizations or individuals who have been exemplary in WOLA's vision of a world where human rights and social justice are the foundation of public policy.

== North American and international recognition ==
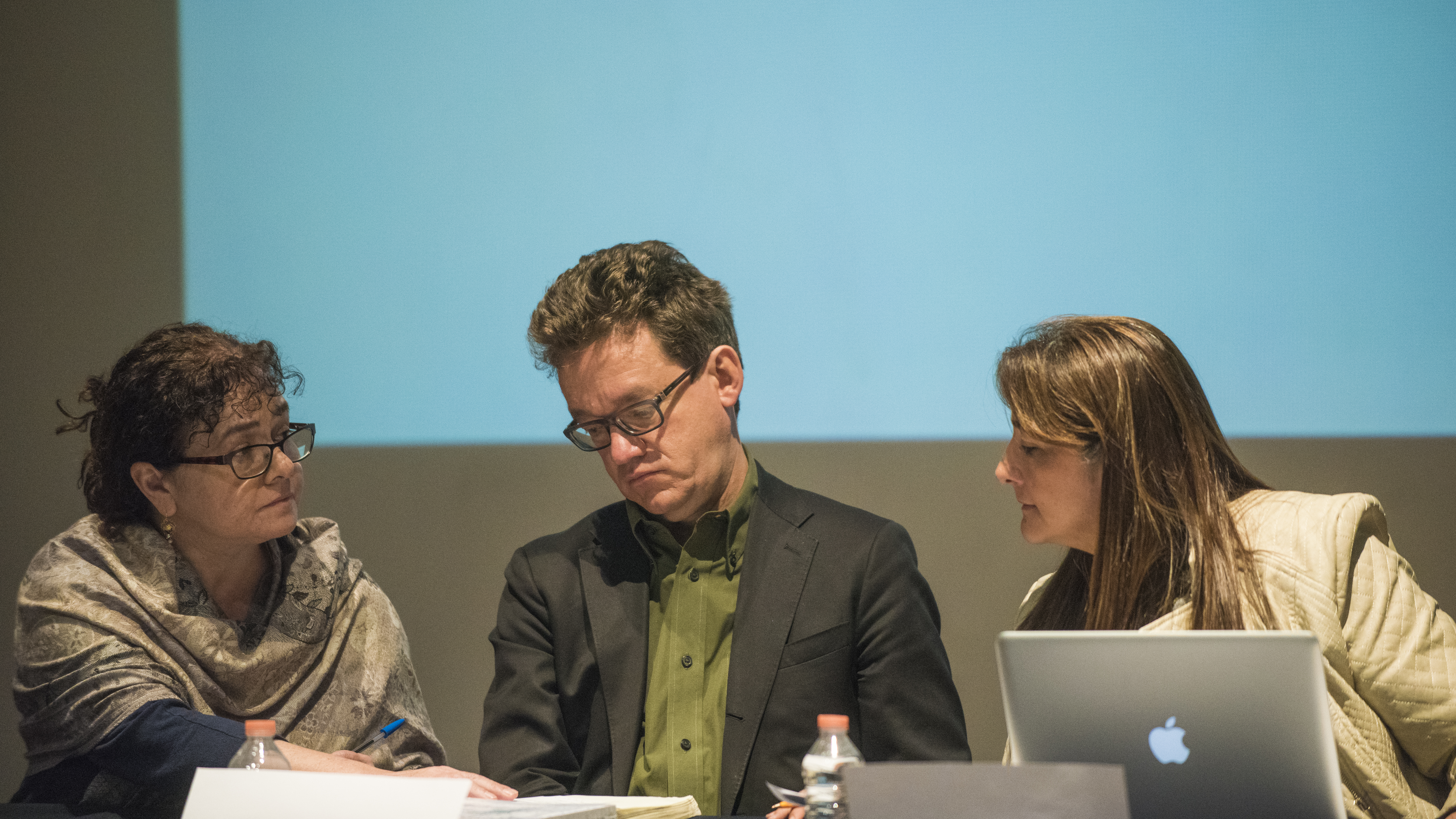
Paz y Paz (left) with fellow GIEI members Alejandro Valencia (center) and Ángela María Buitrago (right).

In 2012, Forbes magazine named Paz y Paz one of the "five most powerful women changing the world". In 2013, Paz y Paz was awarded the Judith Lee Stronach Human Rights Award. Paz y Paz was also considered to be a leading candidate for the 2013 Nobel Peace Prize. The prize was ultimately won by the Organisation for the Prohibition of Chemical Weapons.

On 15 December 2011, the International Crisis Group held its "In Pursuit of Peace" Award Dinner. Claudia Paz y Paz was one of four women honored by U.S. Secretary of State Hillary Clinton for their dedication to promoting peaceful, just, and open societies in some of the world's most conflict-affected regions.

In 2012, the Latin American Studies Association awarded Paz y Paz the LASA/Oxfam America Martin Diskin Memorial Lectureship, which honors distinguished individuals who combine rigorous scholarship with a commitment to human rights activism.

Paz y Paz was named one of BBC's 100 Women of 2013.

== Education ==
PhD in Criminal Law and Human Rights, Universidad de Salamanca

J.D. Universidad Rafael Landivar

Honorary Doctorate, Georgetown University

Political offices
Preceded by María Encarnación Mejía García de Contreras (interim)	Attorney General of Guatemala; 2010–2014	Succeeded by Thelma Aldana
