= Roberto Molina Barreto =

Guatemalan lawyer and politician

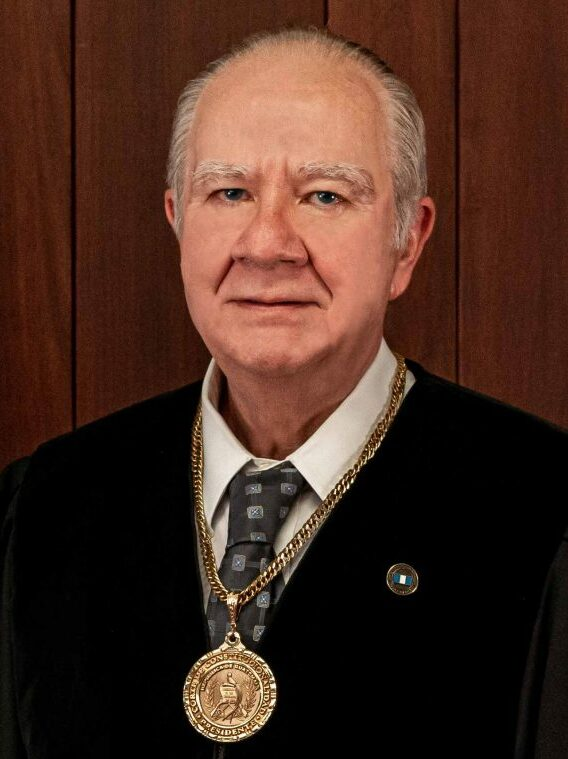
- Official portrait, 2021

Personal details
- Born: Roberto Molina Barreto; 8 November 1955 (age 70) Guatemala City, Guatemala
- Party: Valor (since 2018)
- Spouse: Nora Patricia Spillari Umaña (m. 1975)

Roberto Molina Barreto (born November 8, 1955) is a Guatemalan attorney and politician, who served as Attorney General of the Nation from 2005 to 2006, magistrate of the Constitutional Court from 2006 to 2016 and from 2020 and President of the Constitutional Court on three occasions.

On December 2, 2018, he was proclaimed candidate for vice president by Valor along with Zury Ríos –daughter of Efraín Ríos Montt– as candidate for president.

== Biography ==
He graduated in 1984 from the University of San Carlos of Guatemala where he obtained the titles of Law and Social Sciences, Lawyer and Notary Public. He began his career, in 1974, in the Judicial Branch where he served as an assistant officer in the courts until 1980, from that year he founded his own law firm "Molina Barreto & Asociados" in which he worked for several years in the private sphere.

=== Attorney General of the Nation ===
On March 18, 2005, Óscar Berger, president of Guatemala at the time, appointed him as Attorney General of the Nation -PGN in spanish-, after having dismissed Luis Alfonso Rosales, who had been appointed in 2002 by Alfonso Portillo. Before that appointment, Molina Barreto worked and was a founding associate at the Center for the Defense of the Constitution -CEDECON in spanish-, a non-governmental organization in charge of litigating cases of constitutional rank before the Constitutional Court of Guatemala, it was there where he acquired knowledge constitutional law practitioner and belonging to said association was a determining factor for Berger to decide to appoint him as attorney general.

As a lawyer and constitutionalist, Molina participated in studies, analyzes and opinions that were carried out for initiatives to reform the Electoral Law and the Law of Amparo, Habeas Corpus and Constitutionality, both two very important laws in Guatemala. In his position as Attorney General of the Nation, he was a representative of Guatemala and advised on the implementation of the issue of adoptions in the Hague Intercountry Adoption Convention. He also presented a bill to approve an organic law of the Office of the Attorney General of the Nation and promoted legislation for adoption of minors in Guatemala and the development of the matter in the PGN.

The following year, in March 2006, Berger appointed him as a magistrate of the Constitutional Court for the period that began that year and ended in 2011, for which Molina Barreto resigned from the position of attorney general to be able to take office on the court in April of that year.

=== Constitutional magistrate ===
From April 14, 2006, to the same date in 2011, he was a magistrate of the constitutional court, and he additionally was president in 2010 to 2011. During that period, he founded the Institute of Constitutional Justice, which is attached to the Constitutional Court.

In 2011 he was again appointed as a magistrate of the Constitutional Court, but this time it was by the Supreme Court of Justice, during this period he signed in favor of a resolution that annulled the sentence made to Efraín Ríos Montt for alleged crimes of lesa humanity, arguing that the "First High Risk Court A" had not resolved a challenge filed against two members of that judiciary by the defendant's defense attorney, committing a procedural error; this resolution was signed by Héctor Pérez Aguilera and Alejandro Maldonado Aguirre supporting this criterion.

He was president of the court, again, between 2014 and 2015 and during the political crisis in Guatemala in 2015, in the framework of the discovery of several cases of corruption, including the La Línea case, it was controversial when, in June, he voted in favor to stop a process to withdraw Otto Pérez Molina's immunity due to an appeal filed by some opposition deputies but that had nothing to do with the case and had not been requested by the Public Ministry. His period in the Constitutional Court finished in April, 2016.

On November 10, 2020, he was appointed, by the Supreme Court of Justice, again as a Magistrate of the Constitutional Court to fill the vacant position left by Neftaly Aldana Herrera, who resigned as a magistrate on October 21 of that year because of a disease that he had, in the period ending April 14, 2021.

On March 10, 2021, he was confirmed in office to serve in the VIII magistracy that will end in 2026, he was also its president between April 2021 and April 2022.

=== Political career ===
On December 2, 2018, he was proclaimed a candidate for vice president of Guatemala by the Valor political party together with Zury Ríos, daughter of Efraín Ríos Montt, as a candidate for the presidency. but he could not participate in the elections because the Constitutional Court annulled the registration of both due to an alleged constitutional prohibition of his running mate, of which he assured that it did not apply to her and pointed to Gloria Porras as responsible for having led the opinion of the other 3 magistrates who voted in favor of the resolution. They didn't participate in that elections.
