= Cristina Siekavizza =

Guatemalan murder victim

- Born: 9 December 1977 (age 48); Guatemala City, Guatemala
- Disappeared: July 7, 2011 (aged 33); Guatemala City
- Status: Missing for 15 years, 2 months and 23 days
- Occupation: Housewife
- Spouse: Roberto Eduardo Barreda de Leon
- Children: 2

Cristina Siekavizza (born 9 December 1977) was a Guatemala City woman, a graduate in Business Administration and mother of two children, whose disappearance and possible murder by her husband early in July 2011 resulted in an extensive national news coverage focused on the connected issues of femicide and impunity.

Roberto Barreda (born 1976; deceased 6 August 2020, aged 44, in Guatemala City) was the main suspect in the disappearance and possible murder of his wife, Cristina Siekavizza. The crime would have occurred on July 6, 2011 and the trial was expected to take place in April 2020. However, the Covid-19 pandemic has prevented its realization. The trial was later cancelled given Barreda’s death on August 6, 2020 from Covid-19.

In this case, Ofelia de León, Barreda's mother and former president of the Supreme Court of Justice, is also accused. Investigator Óscar José Celada Cuevas and Javier Armando Mendizábal Ruiz are also implicated, whom the MP accuses of hiding information about the disappearance of Cristina Siekavizza.

== Investigations ==
The case was originally thought to be a kidnapping, and private investigators were hired to solve the case. After several weeks passed without a call from the alleged kidnappers, the case was turned over to the Guatemalan police. As the police began to investigate, they found incriminating evidence (traces of blood in the house) against Siekavizza's husband, Roberto Barreda de León. A housekeeper testified that there had been a violent domestic quarrel the evening before the woman's disappearance and that she had seen her lifeless body lying in one of the rooms.

== Prosecution of the husband ==
In early August, before the housekeeper could even testify and while the search for Cristina Siekavizza was still going on, Roberto Barreda suddenly disappeared with the family's two children, Roberto José (age 7) and Maria Mercedes (age 4). An international warrant was issued for his arrest. In the meantime, three people were arrested on the suspicion of having aided the husband in removing the traces of the crime. On 21 October 2011, Barreda's mother, Beatriz Ofelia de León, ex-magistrate of the Supreme Court of Guatemala, was arrested for corruption of justice in the Siekavizza case. Barreda was finally caught in Mérida, Yucatán (Mexico) and extradited on 8 November 2013. Guatemalan authorities credited the Facebook group "Voces por Cristina," which had approximately 25,000 followers helping to track Barreda, with providing the tip about his location; he was reportedly traced via his mobile phone's GPS signal. Since then, his lawyers had consistently attempted to obstruct the course of justice, so that seven years after Siekavizza's disappearance, the process was still to begin, with the husband remaining in custody. In August 2020 it was announced that Barreda had died due to contracting COVID-19 in the Hospital General San Juan de Dios in Guatemala City.

== Public protests against femicide ==
Siekavizza's disappearance, and possible murder, have moved Guatemalans to demand justice against a growing epidemic of femicide happening in their country. Siekavizza's family has organized marches throughout Guatemala City (Obelisco, Avenida Las Américas, carretera an El Salvador and Vista Hermosa) to support victims of domestic violence. Cristina Siekavizza's case has dominated the Guatemalan press since news of her disappearance went public.

In July 2024, on the 13th anniversary of her disappearance, the Guatemalan human rights organization Fundación Sobrevivientes held a tribute to Cristina Siekavizza, naming one of its rooms in her honour. Cristina's parents and her two children attended the ceremony. The case remains open, with the Public Ministry continuing to search for her remains. The director of Fundación Sobrevivientes, Norma Cruz, noted that the case still awaits results despite the special prosecutor's office remaining active.

== See also ==
- List of people who disappeared mysteriously: post-1970
