= Thelma Aldana =

Guatemalan jurist and politician

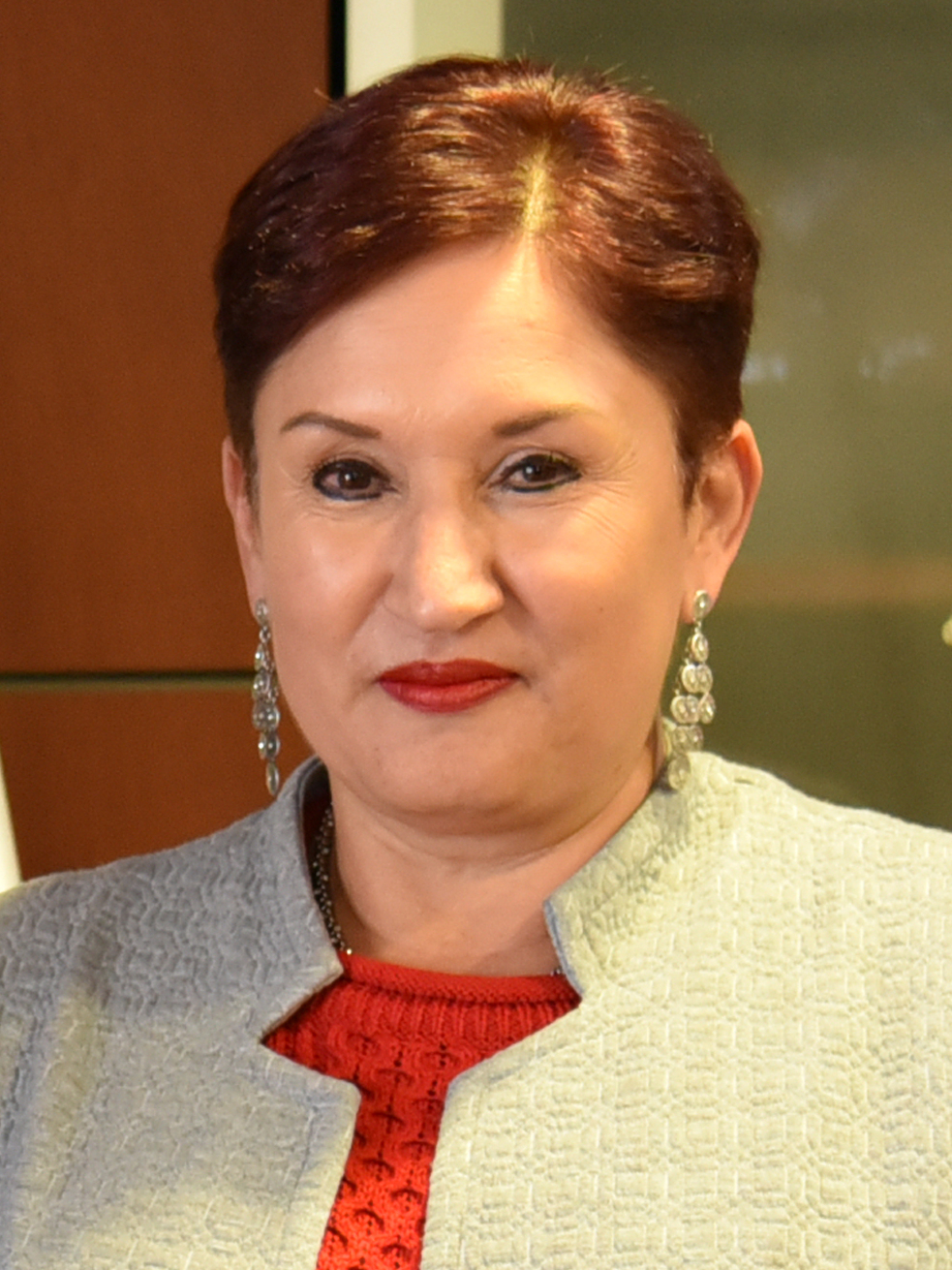

11th Attorney General of Guatemala
- In office 17 May 2014 – 16 May 2018
- President: Otto Pérez Molina; Alejandro Maldonado; Jimmy Morales
- Preceded by: Claudia Paz y Paz
- Succeeded by: María Consuelo Porras

55th President of the Supreme Court of Justice of Guatemala
- In office 13 October 2011 – 13 October 2012
- President: Álvaro Colom; Otto Pérez Molina
- Preceded by: Arturo Archila
- Succeeded by: Gabriel Medrano

Personal details
- Born: Thelma Esperanza Aldana Hernández; 27 September 1955 (age 71) Gualán, Zacapa, Guatemala
- Party: Semilla
- Awards: Right Livelihood Award

Thelma Esperanza Aldana Hernández (Note: In this Spanish name, the first or paternal surname is Aldana and the second or maternal family name is Hernández.) (Spanish pronunciation: ['telma espe'ɾansa al'dana eɾ'nanðes]; born 27 September 1955) is a Guatemalan jurist and politician who served as president of the Supreme Court from 2011 to 2012 and as attorney general from 2014 to 2018.

== Early life and education ==
Thelma Aldana was born in Gualán, in the eastern department of Zacapa, in 1955. She is daughter of Humberto Aldana Vidal, a pharmacy attendant, and Marta Julia Hernández Garza, a rural teacher. In 1982 Aldana graduated as a lawyer and notary from the University of San Carlos in Quetzaltenango. She has a master's degree in civil and procedural law.

== Career ==
She started her career in 1981 as a janitor at a family court in Quetzaltenango. In 1999 she was appointed judge in a court of appeals. In 2009 she became a magistrate in the Supreme Court. She served as the president of the Supreme Court from 2011-2012. In 2014 she replaced Claudia Paz y Paz as Guatemala’s attorney general. She is married.

=== Courts for violence against women ===
In 2011, when she was president of the Supreme Court, Aldana started special courts in Guatemala for femicide cases. Killing women, and violence against women are rampant in Guatemala; every year there are on the average 56,000 reports of violence against women. Eleven districts now have the special courts. Judges and police officers receive special gender crime training.

=== Against corruption ===
In 2015 Aldana led another investigation into government corruption. In this, she closely cooperated with the Commissioner of the UN International Commission against Impunity in Guatemala (CICIG), Iván Velásquez Gómez. As a result, President Otto Pérez Molina was forced to resign.

== Presidential campaign ==
In 2019, Aldana entered the presidential election, campaigning on the platform of anti-corruption with new party Semilla. However, on 15 May, the Constitutional Court rejected her candidacy for president, since she had been charged with corruption, despite no evidence being presented. It's believed that the charges were presented to stop her candidacy and an eventual presidency since she was the front-runner.

== Awards ==
In 2015 Aldana won the Jaime Brunet Prize for the Promotion of Human Rights from the Public University of Navarra. The prize was for her work for women's rights, against gender violence, and for the rights of the indigenous peoples, as well as against political corruption. The prize was 36,000 euros.

In 2016 she was recognised with an International Women of Courage Award by the US Secretary of State.

In 2018 she was awarded the Right Livelihood Award along with Iván Velásquez Gómez for "their innovative work [with CICIG] in exposing abuse of power and prosecuting corruption, thus rebuilding people’s trust in public institutions."

== See also ==
- Beatriz Ofelia de León - First female president of the Supreme Court of Guatemala
- Silvia Valdés - Third female president of the Supreme Court of Guatemala
- María Consuelo Porras - Attorney General of Guatemala
- List of the first women holders of political offices in North America

Legal offices
Preceded by Claudia Paz y Paz	Attorney General of Guatemala; 2014–2018	Succeeded by María Consuelo Porras
Preceded by Luis Arturo Archila	President of the Supreme Court of Justice; 2011–2012	Succeeded by Gabriel Antonio Medrano
Party political offices
New political party	Semilla Movement nominee for President of Guatemala; 2019	Succeeded by Bernardo Arévalo
Diplomatic posts
Preceded by Aleksandr Konovalov	President of United Nations Convention against Corruption; 2017–2018	Succeeded by María Consuelo Porras
