= Constitutional Court of Guatemala =

- Corte de Constitucionalidad de la República de Guatemala

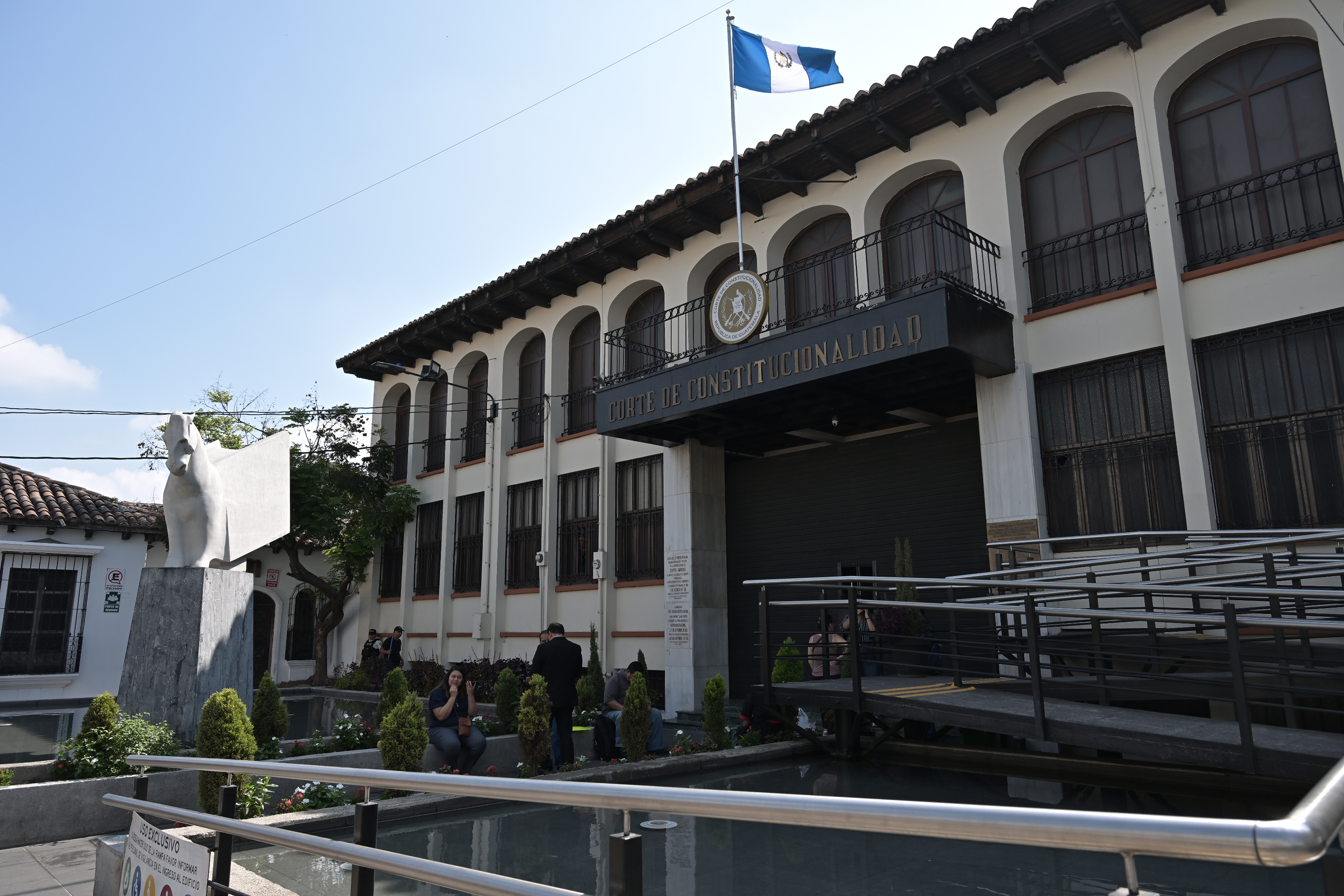
- Building of the Constitutional Court
- Interactive map of Constitutional Court of Guatemala
- Location: Zone 1, Guatemala City
- Number of positions: 10
- Website: www.cc.gob.gt/

The Constitutional Court of Guatemala is the highest court for constitutional law in the Republic of Guatemala. It is tasked with preserving the constitutional order by ruling on questions of the constitutionality of laws or state actions. The Court is normally composed of five titular or primary magistrates who serve five year terms. Each titular magistrate is appointed with a substitute. In special cases two substitutes are added to the bench for a total of seven to hear that case. Each titular member serves for one year as the president of the court.

== History ==
The Court was established by Guatemala's 1985 Constitution. The 1985 Constitution was written after the suspension of the prior constitution as part of Efraín Ríos Montt's Coup d'état on March 23, 1982. His regime suspended the constitution and the subsequent years demonstrated the need for stronger protections and thus a new constitution.

== Function ==
The Guatemalan Constitution lists nine broad functions of the Constitutional Court. These duties serve to establish state overreach but is not equal to the Supreme Court of the United States because it is not a control institution; its sole purpose is the interpretation of the constitution and see to that the laws and regulations are not superior to this. Instead, the Guatemalan Constitutional Court splits final appellate authority with the Supreme Court of Justice of Guatemala. The latter is responsible for reviewing whether a lower court interpreted the law correctly. The Constitutional Court is responsible for deciding whether a law or state action was consistent with the Constitution. Its specific duties are:

- To hear challenges of laws on the grounds of partial or total unconstitutionality.
- To serve as an Extraordinary Tribunal of Amparo for challenges against the Congress, the Supreme Court of Justice, or the President or Vice-President.
- To hear appeals of writs of amparo from other courts.
- To hear appeals of challenges of laws on the grounds of constitutionality.
- To issue an advisory opinion on constitutionality of treaties, agreements, and bills of law.
- To hear and resolve conflicts of jurisdiction in the realm of constitutionality.
- To maintain a jurisprudential bulletin on resolved questions of constitutionality.
- To confirm or reject Executive vetoes alleging unconstitutionality.
- To render opinions on matters under its jurisdiction as defined by the Constitution.

== Appointment and Composition ==
=== Appointment ===
The Court is composed of five titular magistrates, each of whom has a designated substitute. When the Court hears cases against the Supreme Court of Justice, the Congress, or the President or Vice-President two substitutes are drawn by lot to hear the case with the main five. Every five years a new set of magistrates are appointed along with new substitutes. Each of the following bodies appoints one set of magistrates: The Supreme Court of Justice, the Congress of the Republic, the President and the Council of Ministers, the Superior University council of the University of San Carlos de Guatemala, and the Assembly of the College of Attorneys and Notaries.

=== Composition ===
For the 2021-2026 term the Court is composed of the following members:

Magistrate	Role	Appointed By
Dina Josefina Ochoa Escribá	Titular Magistrate	Congress of the Republic
Luis Alfonso Rosales Marroquín	Substitute Magistrate	Congress of the Republic
Héctor Hugo Pérez Aguilera	Titular Magistrate	Superior University council of the University of San Carlos
Rony Eulalio López Contreras	Substitute Magistrate	Superior University council of the University of San Carlos
Néster Mauricio Vásquez Pimentel	Titular Magistrate	Assembly of the College of Attorneys
Claudia Elizabeth Paniagua Pérez	Substitute Magistrate	Assembly of the College of Attorneys
Roberto Molina Barreto	Titular Magistrate	Supreme Court of Justice
Walter Paulino Jiménez Texaj	Substitute Magistrate	Supreme Court of Justice
Leyla Susana Lemus Arriaga	Titular Magistrate	President and the Council of Ministers
Juan Jose Samayoa Villatoro	Substitute Magistrate	President and the Council of Ministers

== Notable cases ==
=== Efraín Ríos Montt trial ===
The Constitutional Court, specifically the VI Magistracy, is best known internationally for overturning the conviction of Efraín Ríos Montt on charges of genocide. The Court ruled 3-2 that his trial did not proceed appropriately and ordered a new process. The majority found that the trial judges erred in expelling Ríos Montt's lawyer during the trial. The dissenting magistrates, Mauro Chacon and Gloria Porras, called the ruling disproportionate. A retrial was delayed by claims of inadequate health. This was the first time a nation tried a former leader domestically for genocide and thus drew significant scholarly and activist attention.
