= Universidad Mariano Gálvez =

University in Guatemala City, Guatemala

Coordinates: 14.6589°N 90.5133°W

- Type: Private
- Location: 3a. Avenida 9-00 zona 2, Interior Finca el Zapote Ciudad de Guatemala, Guatemala City, Guatemala
- Language: Spanish
- Colors: Red and blue
- Website: www.umg.edu.gt

Universidad Mariano Gálvez de Guatemala (UMG) is a private university in Zone 2 of Guatemala City.
