= Constitution of Guatemala =

Constitution of Republic of Guatemala

- Created: 31 May 1985
- Date effective: 14 January 1986
- Location: Hall of Sessions of the Constituent National Assembly
- Author(s): Deputies of the National Constituent Assembly
- Signatories: 88 Deputies
- Purpose: To replace the Guatemalan constitution of 1965

The Constitution of Guatemala is the supreme law of the Republic of Guatemala. It sets the bases for the organization of Guatemalan government and it outlines the three main branches of Guatemalan government: executive branch, legislative branch, and judicial branch.

== History ==
For the current Constitution of the Republic it is necessary to know its history, which is as follows:

- 1824: Decreed on November 22, 1824, the Constitution of the Federal Republic of Central America by the National Constituent Assembly, the first in Central America.
- 1825: Promulgating the October 11, 1825, the first Constitution of the State of Guatemala, also entering into force the same year.
- 1879: Promulgating the 11 December 1879, the Constitutive Act of the Republic of Guatemala, the second of Guatemala and the first of the Republic, also having several reforms throughout its term .
- 1921: Promulgating the September 9, 1921 the Constitution of the Federal Republic of Central America (which includes the states of Guatemala, El Salvador and Honduras ) and enters into force on 1 October 1921 the Constitution of 1921, this being the second in Central America.
- 1945: Adopted on March 11, 1945, and comes into force on March 15, 1945, the Constitution of 1945.
- 1956: Adopted on 2 February 1956 and entered into force on 1 March 1956 the Constitution of 1956.
- 1965: Adopted on September 15, 1965, and comes into force on May 5, 1966, the Constitution of 1965.
- 1985: Adopted on 31 May 1985 and comes into force on January 14, 1986, the current Constitution of the Republic of Guatemala by the National Constituent Assembly.
- 1993: Reform the Constitution on 17 November of that year, after the overthrow of then President of the Republic of Guatemala Jorge Antonio Serrano Elias.
- 1999: A referendum is done to reform the Constitution again, said reform bill not approved by such consultation .

== Provisions ==
The Constitution of the Republic of Guatemala of 1985 is legally divided into three parts:

- Dogmatic Part: Article 1 to Article 139. Considered the most important part of the charter, these articles enumerate the fundamental rights and freedoms.
- Organic Part: Article 140 to Article 262. These articles establish the Organization of the State and the State Agency, which are:
  - Legislative body (Article 157 to Article 181)
  - Executive Agency (Article 182 to Article 202)
  - Judiciary (Article 203 to Article 222)
  As well as autonomous and decentralized entities
- Procedural, pragmatic or practical part: Guarantees the mechanisms established to enforce the rights enshrined in the Constitution, in order to defend the constitutional order.

=== Preamble ===
The preamble to the current Constitution of the Republic is:

Calling on the name of God

We, the representatives of the people of Guatemala, elected freely and democratically, meeting in National Constituent Assembly in order to organize legally and politically the State; affirming the primacy of the human person as the subject and purpose of social order; recognizing the family as the primary and fundamental genesis of the spiritual and moral values of society and the State, responsible for promoting the common good, the consolidation of the regime of legality, security, justice, equality, freedom and peace; inspired by the ideals of our ancestors and picking up our traditions and cultural heritage; determined to promote the full enjoyment of human rights within a stable, permanent and popular institutional order, where rulers and ruled proceed with absolute adherence to the law.

We Solemnly Decree, Sanction and Promulgate
The Following:
Constitution of the Republic of Guatemala

=== Structure ===
- Title I: The human person, purpose and duties of the State (arts. 1–2)
  - Chapter One (arts. 1–2)
- Title II: Human Rights (arts. 3–139)
  - Chapter I: Individual Rights (arts. 3-46)
  - Chapter II : Social Rights (arts. 47–134)
    - Section One : Family
    - Section Two: Culture
    - Section Three: Indigenous Communities
    - Section Four: Education
    - Section Five: Universities
    - Section Six: Sport
    - Section Seven : Health, Safety and Welfare
    - Section Eight : Work
    - Section Nine : State Workers
    - Section Ten : Economic and Social Regime
  - Chapter III : Duties and Civil and Political Rights (arts. 135–137)
  - Chapter IV : Limitation of Constitutional Rights (arts. 138–139)
- Title III: The State (arts. 140–151)
  - Chapter I: The State and its form of government (arts. 140–143)
  - Chapter II : Nationality and Citizenship (arts. 144–148)
  - Chapter III : International Relations of the State (arts. 149–151)
- Title IV: Public Power (arts. 152–222)
  - Chapter I: exercise of public authority (arts. 152–156)
  - Chapter II: Legislative Branch (sections 157–181)
    - Section One: Congress
    - Section Two: Powers of Congress
    - Section Three: Training and Punishment Act
  - Chapter III: Executive Agency (arts. 182–202)
    - Section One: President of the Republic
    - Section Two: Vice President
    - Section Three: Ministers of State
  - Chapter IV: judiciary (arts. 203–222)
    - Section One: General Provisions
    - Section Two: Supreme Court
    - Section Three: Court of Appeal and other courts
- Title V: Structure and Organization of the State (arts 223–262)
  - Chapter I: Political Election System (arts. 223)
  - Chapter II: Administrative Regime (arts. 224–231)
  - Chapter III: Board of Control and Supervision (arts. 232–236)
  - Chapter IV: Financial Regime (arts. 237–243)
  - Chapter V: Army (sections 244–250)
  - Chapter VI: Public Ministry and Attorney General's Office (arts. 251–252)
  - Chapter VII: Municipal Regime (arts. 253–262)
- Title VI: Constitutional Guarantees and Defense of the Constitutional Order (arts. 263–276)
  - Chapter I: Personal Exhibition (arts. 263–264)
  - Chapter II : Amparo (art. 265)
  - Chapter III : Unconstitutionality of Laws (arts. 266–267)
  - Chapter IV : Court Constitutionality (arts. 268–272)
  - Chapter V : Commission and Ombudsman for Human Rights (arts. 273–275)
  - Chapter VI : Law on Amparo, Habeas Corpus and Constitutionality (art. 276 )
- Title VII: Amendments to the Constitution (arts. 277–281)
  - Chapter One (arts. 277–281)
- Title VIII: Transitional and Final Provisions (arts. 1 to 27)
  - Chapter One : Transitional and Final Provisions (arts. 1 to 27)

== Amendment process ==
The Constitution of the Republic of Guatemala is mixed class, as may be amended part by the Congress of the Republic of Guatemala and elsewhere by the National Constituent Assembly. The Constitution of the Republic of Guatemala to be reformed is based from Article 277 to Article 281 of the same supreme law.

=== Methods of reform ===
Initiatives to propose reforms to the Constitution:

- The President of the Republic in Council of Ministers
- Ten or more deputies to the Congress of the Republic
- The Constitutional Court
- The people by petition to Congress, not less than five thousand citizens duly registered by the Register of Citizens

In any of the above cases, Congress must address the matter raised without any delay.

== Constitutional principles ==
Principle of the supremacy of the Constitution

- Article 44 last paragraph
- Article 175
- Article 204

Principle of hierarchy

- Article 9 of the Judiciary Act
  - 1. National Constituent Assembly
    - The Constitution of the Republic of Guatemala
    - The Law on Amparo, Habeas Corpus and Constitutionality
    - The Public Order Act
    - Electoral and Political Parties Law
    - Law of Thought
  - 2. Legislative Branch
    - Decrees of the Congress of the **Republic of Guatemala
  - Civil Code
  - Penal code
  - Civil and Commercial Code
  - Criminal Procedure Code
  - Work code
  - Commercial Code of Guatemala
  - Municipal code
  - 3. Common and Statutory Law
    - Governmental Agreements created by the President of the Republic of Guatemala, autonomous institutions and decentralized
  - 4. Individualized
    - Are the resolutions, contracts or judgments that affect a person or group of determined persons.

=== Law initiative ===
Article 174 of the Constitution says that for the formation of the legislation lies with the following institutions :

- The Congress of Guatemala .
- The Executive Agency.
- The Supreme Court of Justice.
- The University of San Carlos of Guatemala.
- The Supreme Electoral Tribunal.

== Autonomous bodies regulated in the Constitution ==
- Central National School of Agriculture (Article 79)
- University of San Carlos of Guatemala (Article 82)
- Autonomous Sports Confederation of Guatemala and the Guatemalan Olympic Committee (Article 92)
- Guatemalan Institute of Social Security (Article 100)
- Monetary Board (Articles 132–133)
- Municipalities (Article 253)

== Human Rights classes ==
- 1. Rights of the First Generation
  - Individual ( Civil ) : Arts. 3-46 .
  - Civic and Political Arts. 135-139 .
- 2. Second Generation Rights
  - Social and Cultural Arts. 47-134 .
- 3. Rights of the Third Generation
  - Environmental Rights
  - Information Rights : Art . 44 .
  - International Treaties

== See also ==
- Politics of Guatemala
- Guatemala
- List of political parties in Guatemala
