= Supreme Court of Justice of Guatemala =

- Corte Suprema de Justicia de Guatemala

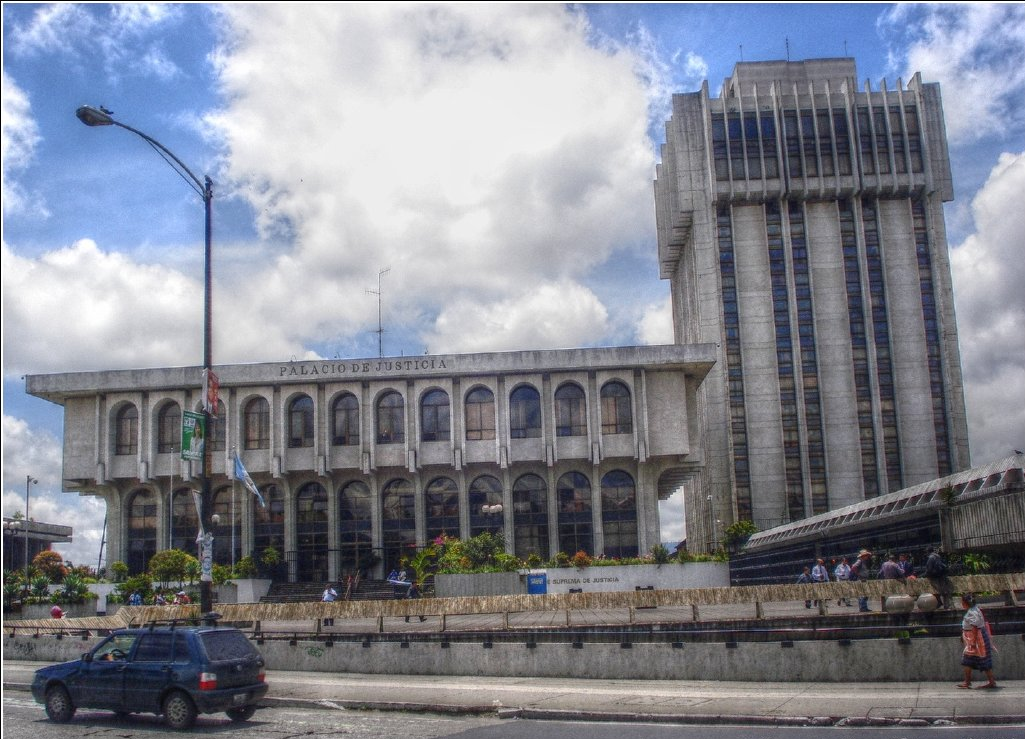
- Palace of Justice, the seat of the Supreme Court of Justice
- Interactive map of Supreme Court of Justice of Guatemala
- 14°37′37.1077″N 90°30′47.6303″W
- Established: October 11, 1825; 200 years ago
- Jurisdiction: Guatemala
- Coordinates: 14°37′37.1077″N 90°30′47.6303″W
- Number of positions: 13
- Language: Spanish
- Website: www.oj.gob.gt

President of the Supreme Court of Justice
- Currently: Oscar Cruz Oliva
- Since: 21 November 2023

The Supreme Court of Justice of Guatemala (La Corte Suprema de Justicia), or CSJ, is the highest court within Guatemala's judiciary branch. As the highest Court in Guatemala, it has jurisdiction over all legal matters that may arise in the country. The Court sits in the Palace of Justice, in Zone 1 of Guatemala City. The current president of the Supreme Court of Justice is Oscar Cruz Oliva, who was voted in by the Congress of the Republic of Guatemala.

The Supreme Court of Justice was established by the Constitution of Guatemala (articles 203–222) and also operates under the legal framework set out in the Law of the Judicial Branch, Decree Number 2-89 of the Congress of the Republic of Guatemala and the General Regulation of the Courts, Agreement Number 36-2004. The Supreme Court is composed of thirteen justices, including its president.

== Composition ==
The Justices of the CSJ are elected for a five-year term and choose their president from among themselves. The current composition of the Court is as follows:

Name	Position
Oscar Ruperto Cruz Oliva	President
Elvia Ester Velásquez Sagastume	
René Guillermo Girón Palacios	
Evert Obdulio Barrientos Padilla	
Jorge Eduardo Tucux Coyoy	
Gustavo Adolfo Morales Duarte	
Claudia Lucrecia Paredes Castañeda	
Ronald Manuel Colindres Roca	
Benicia Contreras Calderón	
Héctor Ricardo Echeverría Méndez	
Manuel Reginaldo Duarte Barrera	
Carlos Humberto Rivera Carillo	
José Luis de Jesús Samayoa Palacios	
