= 2022 in Guatemala =

- Decades: 2000s; 2010s; 2020s
- See also: Other events of 2022; Timeline of Guatemalan history

The following lists events in the year 2022 in Guatemala.

== Incumbents ==
- President:Alejandro Eduardo Giammattei Falla (since 2020)
- Vice-President: César Guillermo Castillo Reyes (since 2020)

== Events ==
Ongoing – COVID-19 pandemic in Guatemala

=== January ===
- A court sentences five former paramilitary members to 30 years for the rapes and enslavement of 36 Mayan women between 1981 and 1985.

=== February ===
- 16 February – 2022 Guatemala earthquake: A magnitude 6.2 earthquake strikes southern Guatemala, causing light damage, landslides, three deaths from heart attacks, and injuring two people.

=== March ===
- 8 March –
  - Journalist Orlando Villanueva is killed in Puerto Barrios.
  - Congress passes the Law for the Protection of Life and the Family, raising abortion penalties to 25 years, banning same-sex marriage, and restricting teaching on sexual diversity.

=== May ===
- 16 May – President Alejandro Giammattei reappoints Consuelo Porras as Attorney General amid a criticized selection process. On the same day, the United States sanctions her over accusations of involvement in significant corruption.

=== June ===
- 25 June – Guatemala Pride returns after two years, drawing over 10,000 participants and featuring embassy delegations.
- 29 June – Guatemala’s under-20 football team qualifies for the 2023 FIFA U-20 World Cup after defeating Mexico on penalties in the CONCACAF U-20 Championship.

=== July ===
- 9 July – Guatemala puts 66 of its municipalities on alert due to a sharp increase in the number of COVID-19 cases.
- 30 July –
  - Armed civilians attack a checkpoint during President Giammattei’s visit to La Laguna, Huehuetenango; one person is injured, four arrested, the president is unharmed, and the official account is questioned.
  - Journalist José Rubén Zamora, founder of El Periódico, is arrested on allegations of money laundering and blackmail; he begins a hunger strike in protest.

=== August ===
- 11 August – Demonstrators protest alleged government corruption outside Guatemala’s National Palace of Culture.
- 30 August – Foreign Minister Mario Búcaro meets with Taiwan’s President Tsai Ing-wen in Taipei, affirming that Guatemala will "always support" Taiwan. China criticizes the visit as political manipulation.

=== September ===
- A judge acquits journalist Carlos Choc, after he was previously accused of incitement related to a 2021 Indigenous protest.

=== November ===
- 16 November – Prosecutors accuse President-elect Bernardo Arévalo and Vice President-elect Karin Herrera of backing university protests, and request to strip their political immunity.
- A judge overseeing a forced disappearance case resigns and leaves the country. UDEFEGUA then reports the government failed to implement a IACHR ruling to protect human rights defenders.

=== December ===
- 7 December – Former President Otto Pérez Molina and ex-Vice President Roxana Baldetti are sentenced to 16 years in prison for illicit association and customs fraud in the La Línea corruption case.

== Deaths ==
- January 6 – Rómulo Méndez, 83, football referee
- February 17 – Gerardo Humberto Flores Reyes, 96, Roman Catholic prelate, bishop of Verapaz (1971–2001)
- February 24 – Roberto Carpio, 91, politician, vice president (1986–1991)
- March 14 – José Ramiro Pellecer Samayoa, 92, Roman Catholic prelate, auxiliary bishop of Guatemala (1967–2010)

== See also ==
- COVID-19 pandemic in North America
- 2020s
- 2022 Atlantic hurricane season
- 2020s in political history
