= 2027 in Guatemala =

- Decades: 2000s; 2010s; 2020s
- See also: Other events of 2026; Timeline of Guatemalan history

The following lists events in the year 2027 in Guatemala.

== Events ==
=== Predicted and scheduled ===
- June –
  - 2027 Guatemalan general election
  - 2027 Guatemala City mayoral election

== Holidays ==
- 1 January – New Year's Day
- 25 March – Maundy Thursday
- 26 March – Good Friday
- 28 March – Easter Sunday
- 1 May – Labour Day
- 28 June – Army Day
- 15 September – Independence Day
- 20 October – Revolution Day
- 1 November – All Saints' Day
- 25 December – Christmas Day
