= 2023 in Guatemala =

- Decades: 2000s; 2010s; 2020s
- See also: Other events of 2023; Timeline of Guatemalan history

The following lists events in the year 2023 in Guatemala.

== Incumbents ==
- President:Alejandro Giammattei
- Vice-President: Guillermo Castillo Reyes (until January 20); Guillermo Castillo onwards

== Events ==
- Ongoing – COVID-19 pandemic in Guatemala
- 4 May – Volcán de Fuego eruption

=== June ===
- 25 June
  - 2023 Guatemalan general election
  - 2023 Guatemala City mayoral election
  - 2023-2024 Guatemalan political crisis

=== September ===
- 3 September – Guatemala's Supreme Electoral Tribunal temporarily reinstates President-elect Bernardo Arévalo's Semilla party, which had been suspended pending an investigation into alleged registration irregularities.
- 12 September – The office of the Guatemala Attorney General carries out raids in the offices of the Supreme Electoral Tribunal and opens electoral boxes that contain the electoral ballots. The Supreme Electoral Tribunal condemns the decision.

=== October ===
- 9 October – Dozens of road blockades are reported throughout the country, mainly in Guatemala City, organized by community organizations demanding Attorney General María Consuelo Porras' resignation.

=== December ===
- 8 December – The Attorney General's Office says that the results of the 2023 general election are "null and void" and should be "annulled". The Organization of American States condemned the actions and called them an "attempted coup d'état".
- 15 December – A ruling from the Inter-American Court of Human Rights finds Guatemala to have violated indigenous rights by allowing a large nickel mine to operate on tribal land.

== Sports ==
- July 2022 - May 2023: 2022–23 Liga Nacional de Guatemala

== Deaths ==
- 23 January - Álvaro Colom, 71, engineer and politician, president (2008–2012).
- 5 April - Hugo Rodríguez Chinchilla, 47, politician, deputy (since 2020).
- 26 August - Milton Francisco Guerra Calderón, 48, farmer and politician, deputy (2012–2020).

== See also ==
- COVID-19 pandemic in North America
- 2020s
- 2020s in political history
