= Guatemala–United States relations =

- Guatemala: United States

Diplomatic mission
- Guatemala Embassy, Washington D.C.: United States Embassy, Guatemala City

There is a U.S. Embassy in Guatemala located in Guatemala City. According to the United States Department of State, relations between the United States and Guatemala have traditionally been close, although sometimes they are tense regarding human, civil, and military rights.

According to a world opinion poll, 82% of Guatemalans viewed the United States positively in 2002. According to the 2012 United States Global Leadership Report, 41% of Guatemalans approved of U.S. leadership, with 16% disapproving and 43% uncertain. In 2017, 67% of Guatemalans had either a "good" or "very good" perception of the United States, down from 80% in 2015.

== History ==
The U.S. Central Intelligence Agency (CIA) has a history of interference in the government of Guatemala. Guatemala is bordered by the North Pacific Ocean and the Gulf of Honduras (also known as the Caribbean Sea). It shares land borders with Mexico, El Salvador, Honduras and Belize. Due to Guatemala's proximity to the United States, fear of the Soviet Union creating a beachhead in Guatemala created panic in the United States government during the Cold War. In an interview, CIA chief Howard Hunt stated that "We were faced here with the obvious intervention of a foreign power, because these home grown parties, are not really home grown, they are being funded... or advised by a foreign power, i.e., the Soviet Union." The CIA undertook Operation PBFortune to overthrow the democratically elected Jacobo Árbenz in the 1954 Guatemalan coup d'état. Carlos Castillo Armas replaced him as a military dictator. Guatemala was subsequently ruled by a series of military dictatorships for decades. Between 1962 and 1996, Left-wing guerrillas fought the U.S. backed military governments during the Guatemalan Civil War.

== Country comparison ==
	Republic of Guatemala	United States of America
Coat of Arms		
Flag	Guatemala	United States
Population	16,176,133	342,197,000
Area	108,889 km^{2} (42,042 mi^{2})	9,820,630 km^{2} (3,791,770 mi^{2})
Population Density	129/km^{2} (330/sq mi)	35/km^{2} (91/sq mi)
Capital	Guatemala City	Washington, D.C.
Largest City	Guatemala City – 2,110,100 (4,500,000 Metro)	New York City – 8,600,710 (19,006,798 Metro)
Government	Unitary presidential constitutional republic	Federal presidential constitutional republic
First Leader	Rafael Carrera	George Washington
Current Leaders	Bernardo Arévalo; Karin Herrera	Donald Trump; JD Vance
Official languages	Spanish	English (de facto, none at federal level)
GDP (nominal)	US$68.389 billion ($4,101 per capita)	US$16.245 trillion ($51,704 per capita)

== Goals of U.S. policy in Guatemala ==
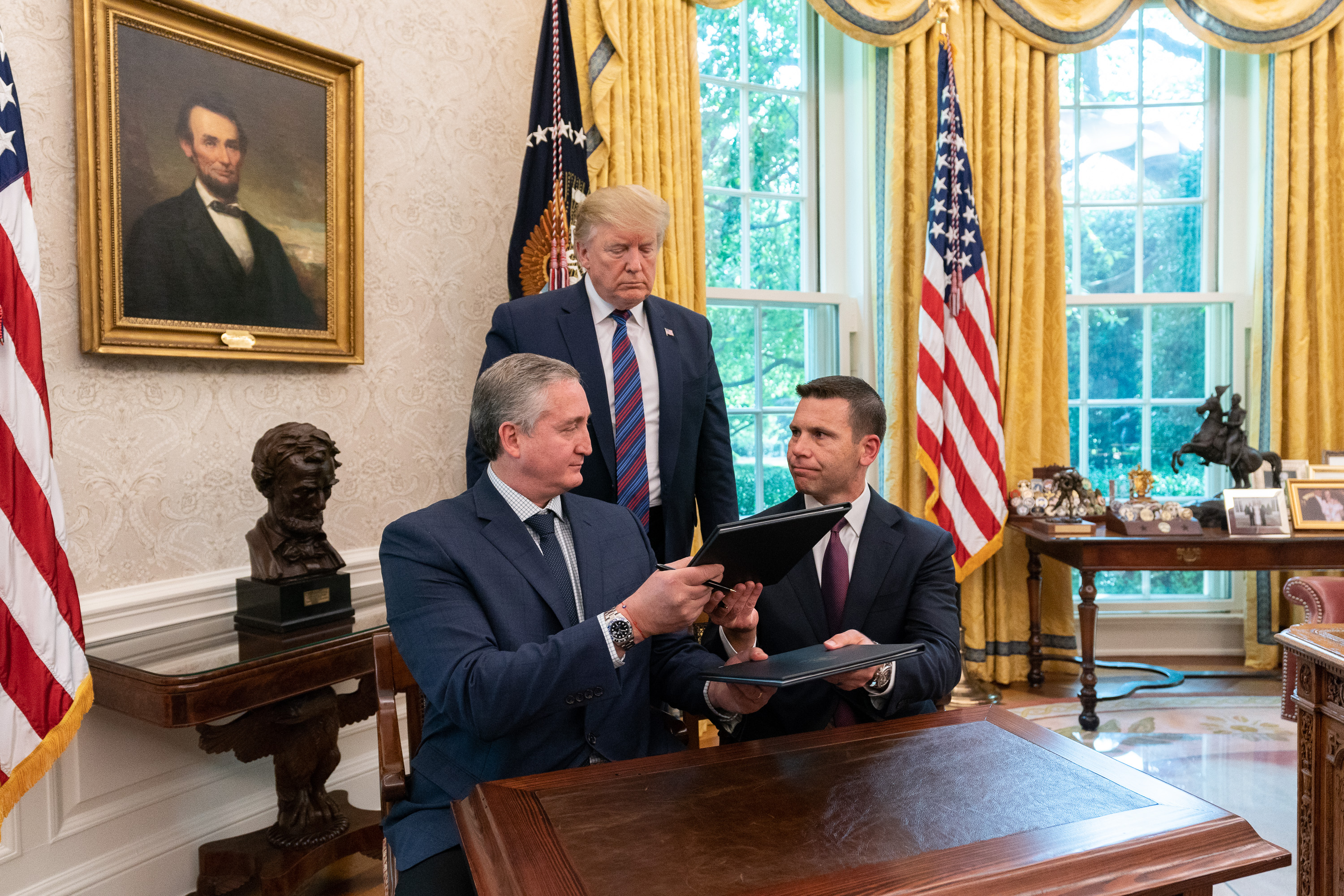
U.S. President Donald Trump watches as Guatemalan Minister of the Interior Enrique Degenhart (left) and U.S. Acting Secretary of Homeland Security Kevin K. McAleenan (right) sign an agreement on Cooperation Regarding the Examination of Protection Claims in 2019

The United States Department of State lists the policy objectives in Guatemala which include:

- Support the institutionalization of democracy and the process of peace accords;
- Promotion of human rights and the rule of law, and application of the International Commission Against Impunity in Guatemala (CICIG);
- Support an increase in economic growth and sustainable development and maintain mutually beneficial commercial and commercial relationships, including ensuring that the benefits of CAFTA-DR reach all sectors of the Guatemalan population;
- Cooperating to combat money laundering, corruption, narcotics trafficking, alien-smuggling, and other transnational crime; and
- Supporting Central American integration through support for resolution of border/territorial disputes.

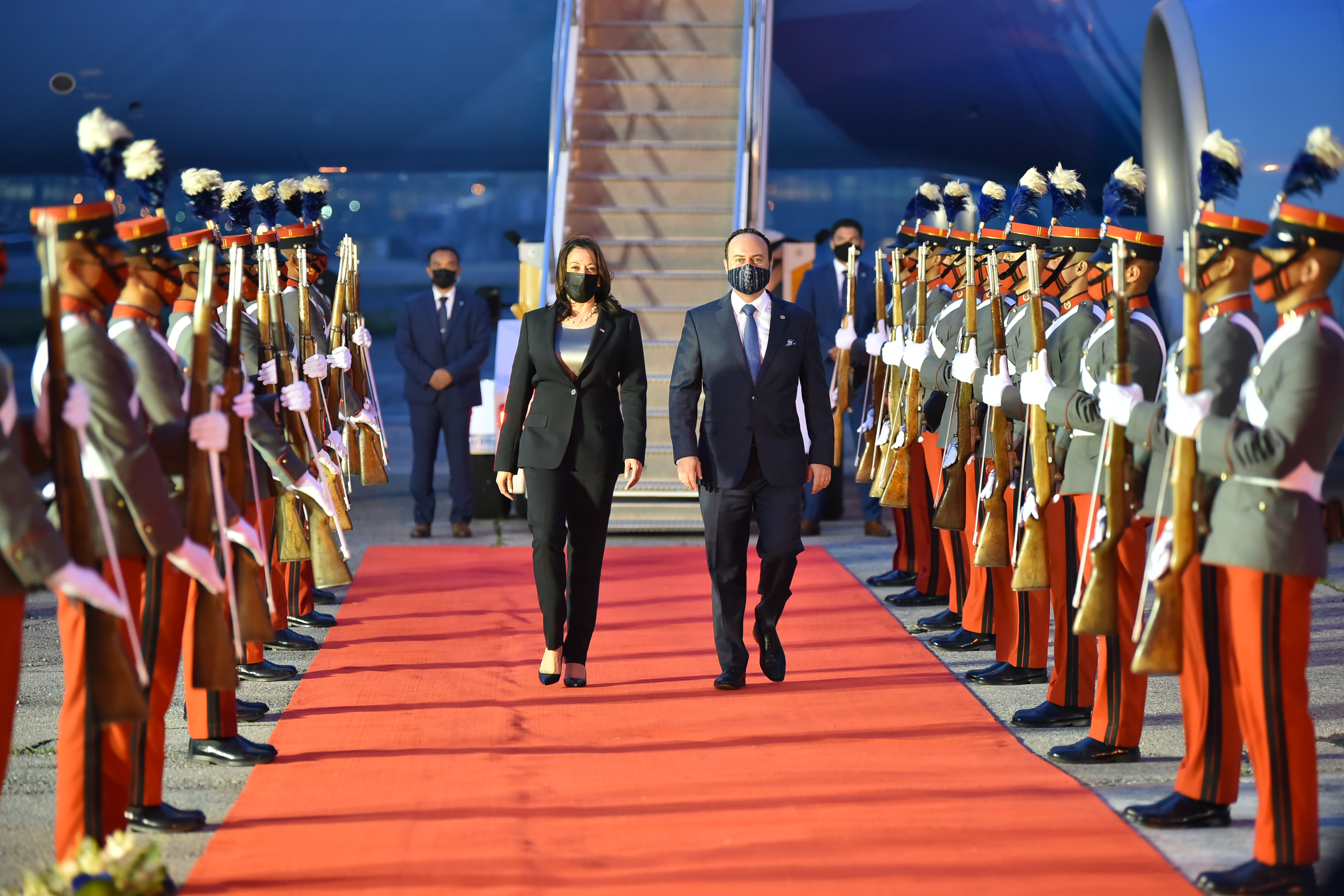
United States Vice President Kamala Harris with the Guatemalan Minister of Foreign Affairs Pedro Brolo during her arrival in Guatemala, 2021.

The United States Department of State says that the U.S., as a member of the ‘Los Amigos de Guatemala’ coalition, along with Colombia, Mexico, Spain, Norway, and Venezuela, played an important role in peace agreements moderated by the UN, provided public support. The United States strongly supports the six substantial peace agreements and three procedural agreements that, combined with the signing of the final agreement on December 29, 1996, form the blueprint for a profound political, economic, and social change. To this end, the government of the United States has committed more than $500 million to support the application of peace since 1997.

The U.S. State Department says most U.S. assistance to Guatemala is provided through the U.S. Agency for International Development's (USAID) for Guatemala. The current USAID / Guatemala program is based on the achievements of the peace process that followed the signing of the peace accords in December 1996, as well as the achievements of its 1997-2004 peace program. The current program works to advance the United States' foreign policy goals, focusing on Guatemala's potential as the United States' most important economic and commercial partner, but also recognizes the country's lagging social indicators and its high poverty rate.

=== Migration policy ===
Under the administration of U.S. President Donald Trump, the U.S. government has expressed concern about granting asylum to migrants from Guatemala and other Central American countries and has made efforts to use Guatemala to curb the number of U.S. migrants from Central America.

On July 15, 2019, Guatemalan President Jimmy Morales cancelled a meeting with U.S. President Donald Trump after the Guatemalan Supreme Court issued an injunction against a proposed deal concerning the Trump Administration's policy objective of limiting the number of Guatemalan migrants entering the United States of America. Morales had been expected to sign the deal, which also sought to use Guatemala as a place where crossing Central American migrants had to apply for asylum before entering the U.S., under pressure from the U.S. government. The agreement was canceled by the Biden administration on February 5, 2021.

== Resident diplomatic missions ==
of the United States in Guatemala

- Guatemala City (Embassy)

of Guatemala in the United States

- Washington, D.C. (Embassy)
- Atlanta (Consulate-General)
- Chicago (Consulate-General)
- Columbus (Consulate-General)
- Denver (Consulate-General)
- Houston (Consulate-General)
- Las Vegas (Consulate-General)
- Los Angeles (Consulate-General)
- Miami (Consulate-General)
- Nashville (Consulate-General)
- New York City (Consulate-General)
- Oklahoma City (Consulate-General)
- Omaha (Consulate-General)
- Philadelphia (Consulate-General)
- Phoenix (Consulate-General)
- Providence (Consulate-General)
- Raleigh (Consulate-General)
- Rockville (Consulate-General)
- San Francisco (Consulate-General)
- Seattle (Consulate-General)
- Dallas (Consulate)
- Del Rio (Consulate)
- Lake Worth (Consulate)
- McAllen (Consulate)
- Riverhead (Consulate)
- San Bernardina (Consulate)
- Tucson (Consulate)
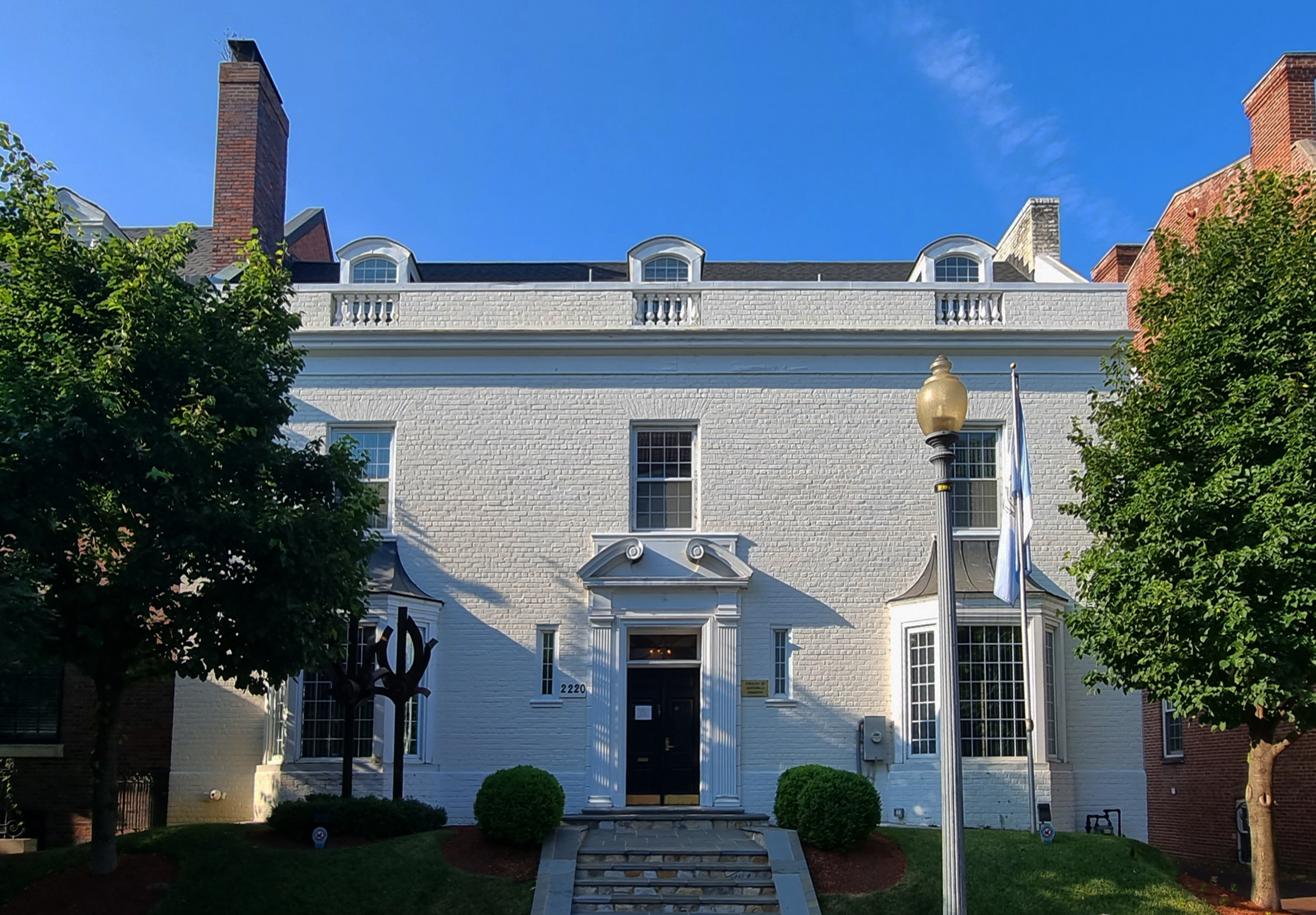
Embassy of Guatemala in Washington, D.C.

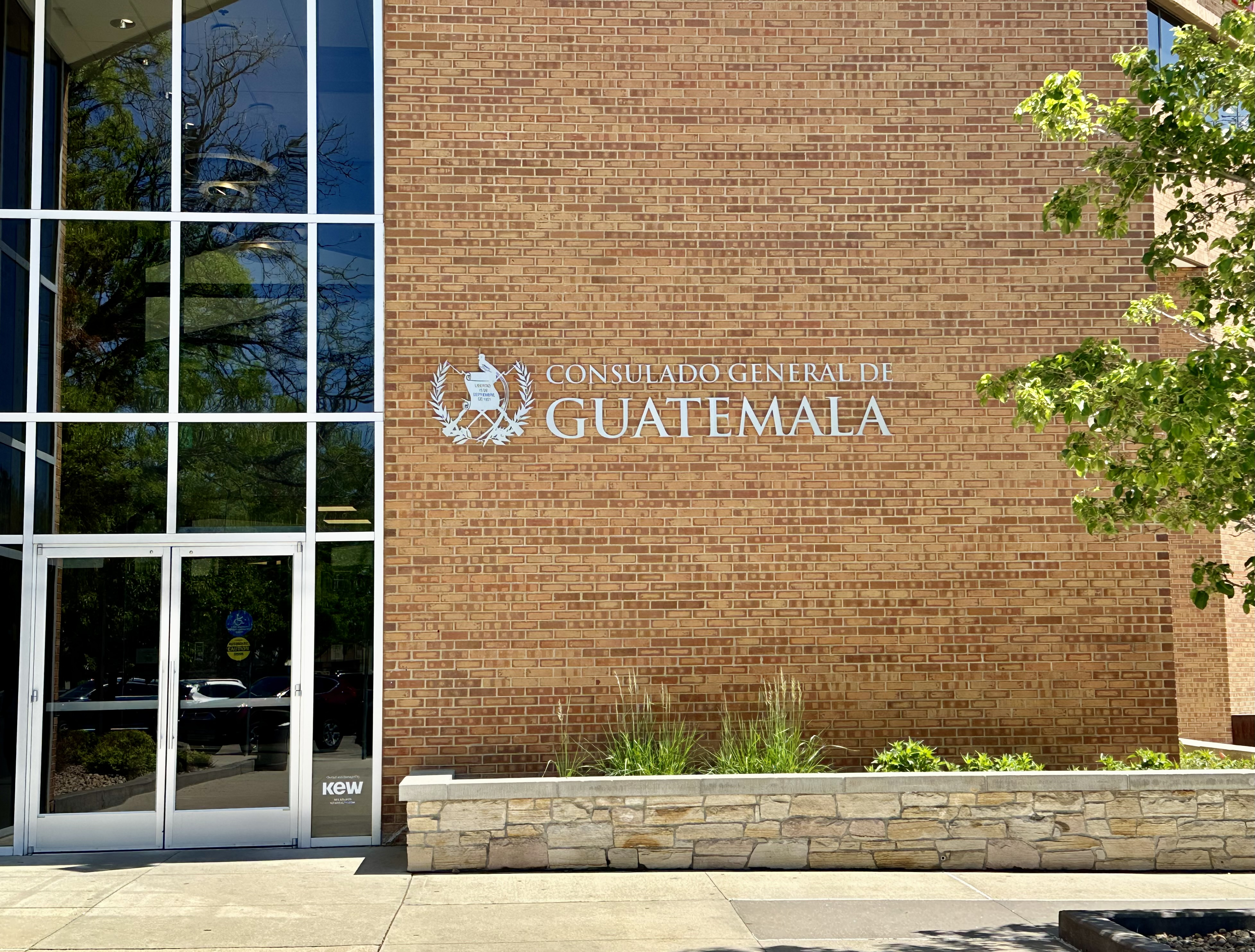
Consulate-General of Guatemala in Denver

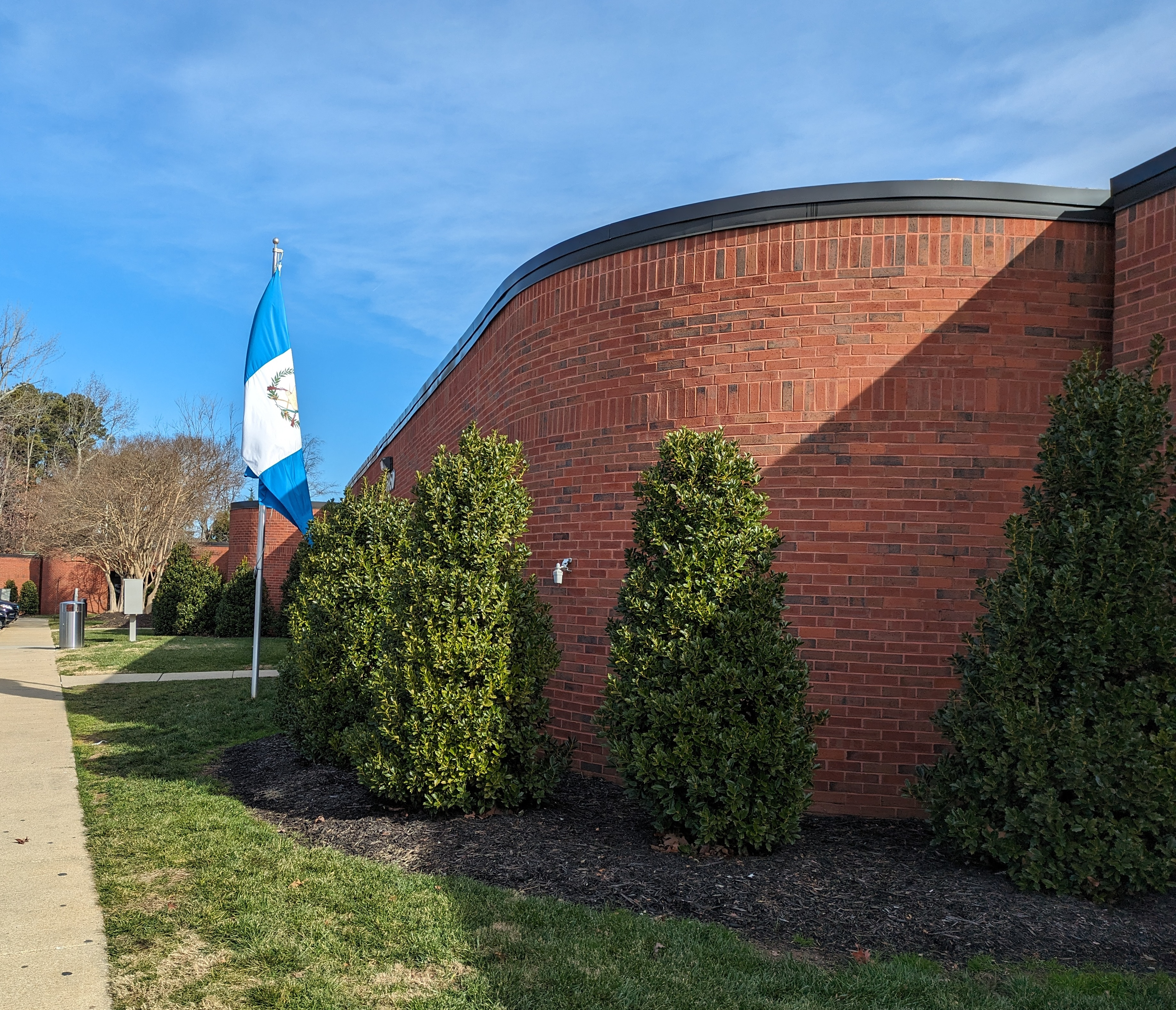
Consulate-General of Guatemala in Raleigh

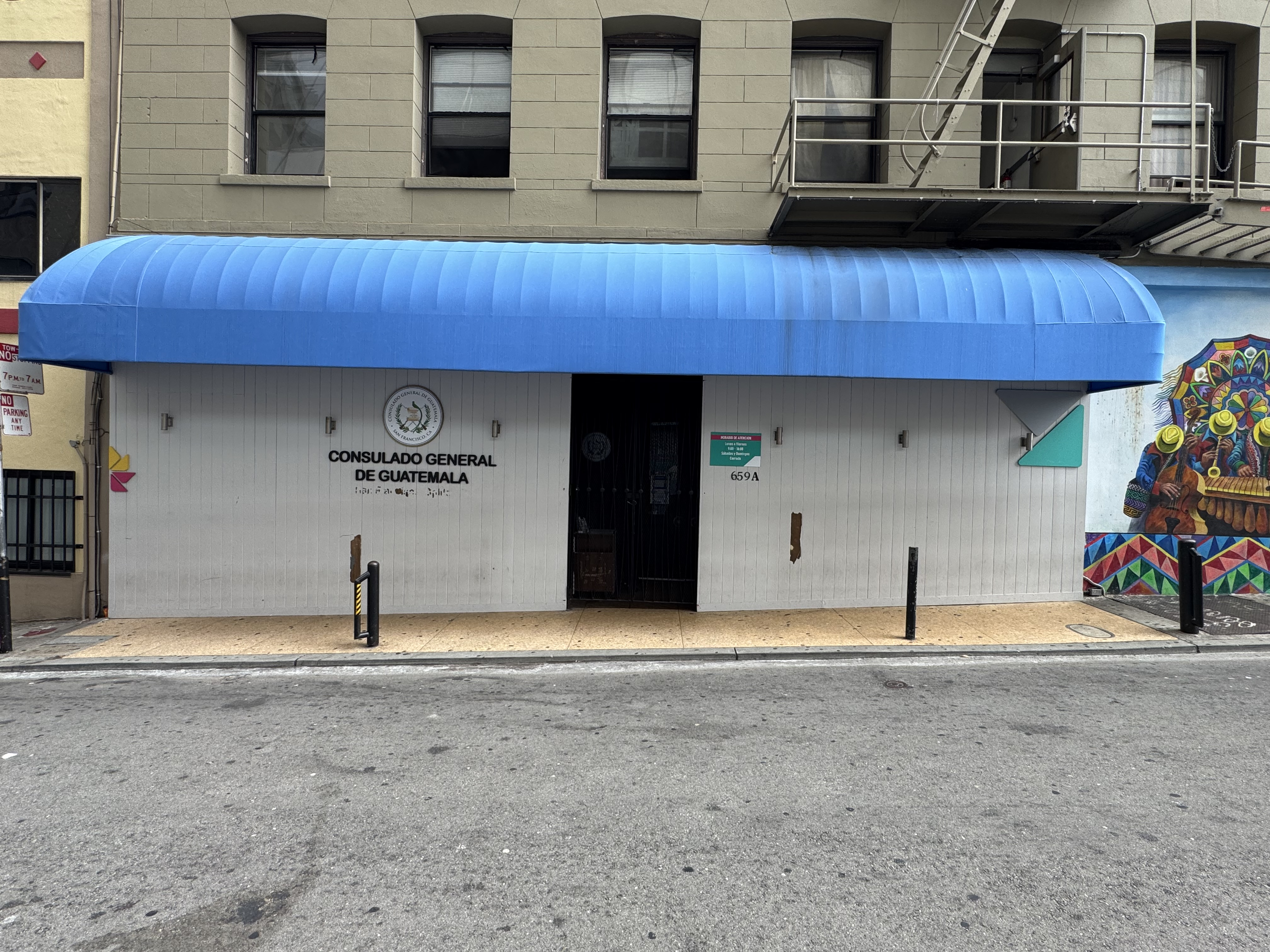
Consulate-General of Guatemala in San Francisco
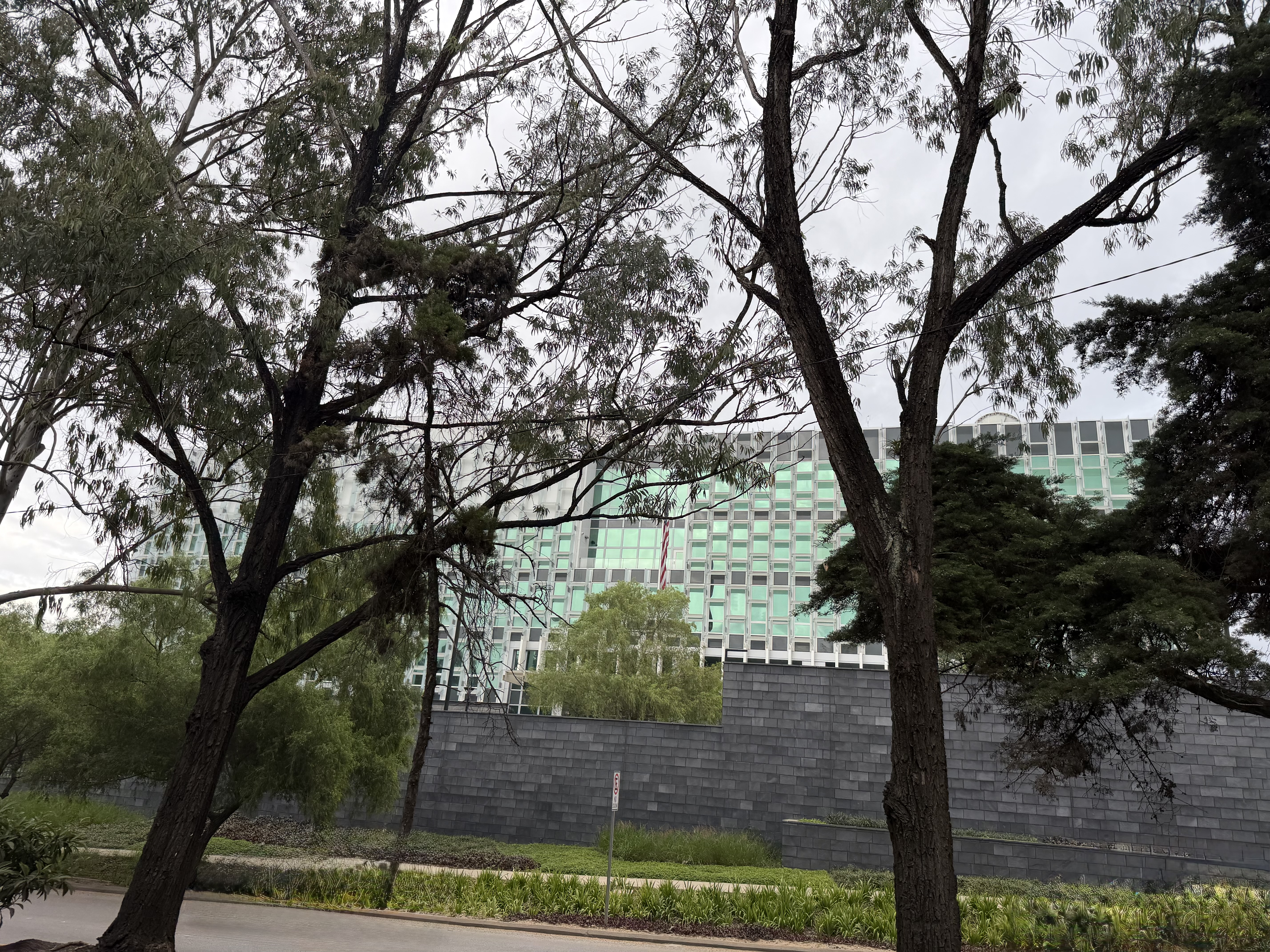
Embassy of the United States in Guatemala City

== See also ==
- Guatemalan Americans
- United States involvement in regime change in Latin America
- Guatemalan Immigration to the United States
- Foreign relations of the United States
- Foreign relations of Guatemala
- Guatemalan Civil War
- Western Hemisphere Institute for Security Cooperation
- Syphilis experiments in Guatemala
- 1954 Guatemalan coup d’état
- CIA activities in Guatemala
- Guatemalan genocide
