= 2026 in Guatemala =

- Decades: 2000s; 2010s; 2020s
- See also: Other events of 2026; Timeline of Guatemalan history

The following lists events in the year 2026 in Guatemala.

== Incumbents ==
- President: Bernardo Arévalo
- Vice-president: Karin Herrera

== Events ==
- 17 January – Inmates stage coordinated uprisings in three prisons nationwide, resulting in 46 guards held hostage.
- 18 January – President Arevalo declares a 30-day state of siege in response to the killing of seven police officers by gangs in retaliation for rescue efforts by authorities in the prison uprisings.
- 12 February –
  - A judge orders imprisoned journalist José Rubén Zamora to be placed under house arrest pending his trial on money laundering charges.
  - 2026 Guatemalan judicial elections.
- 5 May – President Arevalo appoints Gabriel Estuardo García Luna as attorney-general effective 17 May.
- 24 July – The United States imposes a 10% tariff on Guatemala, citing the presence of alleged forced labor in the supply chain.
- 3 August – The Volcán de Fuego erupts.

== Holidays ==
- 1 January – New Year's Day
- 2 April – Maundy Thursday
- 3 April – Good Friday
- 4 April – Easter Sunday
- 1 May – Labour Day
- 30 June – Army Day
- 15 September – Independence Day
- 20 October – Revolution Day
- 1 November – All Saints' Day
- 25 December – Christmas Day

== Deaths ==
- 5 April – Mario Enrique Ríos Montt, 94, Roman Catholic prelate, auxiliary bishop of Guatemala (1987–2010)
- 17 October – Juan Francisco Solórzano Foppa, 43, public prosecutor and anticorruption activist.
