= 2020 in Guatemala =

- Decades: 2000s; 2010s; 2020s
- See also: Other events of 2020; Timeline of Guatemalan history

The following lists events in the year 2020 in Guatemala.

== Incumbents ==
- President: Jimmy Morales (until January 14) Alejandro Eduardo Giammattei Falla (from January 14)
- Vice-President: Jafeth Cabrera (until January 14) César Guillermo Castillo Reyes (from January 14)

== Events ==
=== January and February ===
- January 14 – New President Alejandro Giammattei takes office after a five-hour delay due to protests. Outgoing president Morales is pelted with eggs.
- January 16
  - Guatemala breaks off diplomatic relations with Venezuela.
  - Arrest warrants on corruption charges are issued for eight politicians; former congresswoman Aracely Chavarria and former mayor Angel Ren of Chiche, Quiché, are arrested.
- January 17 – 19 – Guatemalan Soccer League championship.
- January 18
  - The United States Border Patrol tries to deport a sick Honduran woman and her two sick children, ages six and one, to Guatemala.
  - Mexico stops thousands of Honduran immigrants on the border with Guatemala.
- January 20
  - Thousands of Honduran migrants and asylum-seekers battle with Mexican National Guard and try to force their way across the Suchiate River near Ayutla, San Marcos.
  - The government seizes two farms belonging to former Minister of Communications, Infrastructure, and Housing, Alejandro Sinibaldi.
- January 22 – Guatemala is seen as the fifth most corrupt country in the world.
- January 24 – Calm returns to the Mexico-Guatemala border after 800 Honduran immigrants were arrested on January 23.
- January 27 – Guatemalan President Alejandro Giammattei offers El Salvador an opportunity to build and operate a port in Guatemalan waters in the Atlantic.
- January 30 – US Congressman Vicente Gonzalez (D-TX) receives the Order of the Quetzal.
- February 1
  - The United States deported a record 4,171 Guatemalans (3,000 men, 692 women, 479 minors), a 2.27% increase over 2019, during the month of January, according to the Instituto Guatemalteco de Migración (Guatemalan Institute of Migration, IGM).
  - More than 30,000 motorcyclists, many masked and costumed, rode from Guatemala City to Esquipulas, Chiquimula on the 59th pilgrimage to honor the Black Christ of Esquipulas.
- February 4
  - 200,000 people in an earthquake drill held on the 44th anniversary of the 1976 Guatemala earthquake in which 22,000 people died.
  - Oscar Dávila, 44, is appointed to head the investigations into government corruption.
- February 6 – In a visit to the Mexican Senate, President Alejandro Giammattei suggests the two countries construct Muros de Prosperidad ("Prosperity Walls") in the form of an investment bank in the Guatemalan departments of San Marcos, Quiché, and Huehuetenango and the Mexican states of Chiapas and Tabasco in order to stem migration.
- February 7 – The United States offers thousands of H-2B visas to temporary agricultural workers from Guatemala.
- February 7 – 10 – Ultramarathon Xocomil in Lake Atitlán, Sololá Department
- February 15 – 16 – Thousands celebrate the 59th birthday of Trompito the elephant at La Aurora zoo in Guatemala City.
- February 18 – A campaign to reunite families separated by kidnapping and/or irregular adoption during the Guatemalan Civil War of 1960-96 has begun.
- February 22 – March 8 – Campeonato Femenino Sub-20 Concacaf 2020 (Concacaf 2020 Under-20 Women's Championship) in the Dominican Republic.
- February 24 – Thelma Aldana, the former chief prosecutor known for fighting corruption, is granted asylum in the United States after being charged with embezzlement in Guatemala.
- February 28 – Patricia Marroquín de Morales, the wife of former president Jimmy Morales, is wanted for questioning for possible fraud.

=== March and April ===
- March 2 – Pedro Muadi, former president of the Congress of Guatemala, is sentenced to 30 years of prison for corruption.
- March 9 – Guatemala launches its first satellite, the Quetzal 1.
- March 15 – The government announces the first death from COVID-19, an 85-year-old man from San Pedro Sacatepéquez, San Marcos who returned from Spain on March 6.
- March 31 – A riot in a migrant detention center in Tenosique, Tabasco, Mexico, leaves a Guatemalan man dead and four people injured. The detainees were worried about a possible COVID-19 outbreak.
- April 3 – 2,250 people have been arrested for violating the curfew imposed since mid-March while 5,705 people have been detained for leaving their homes without justification.
- April 2 – Rodolfo Galdamez, the technical deputy minister of health, and Hector Marroquin, the administrative deputy minister of health, are fired amid revelations of an alleged corruption ring inside the ministry.
- April 23
  - Gilmer Barrios, a Guatemalan immigrant to the United States, was arrested on March 23 in southern California and deported to Tijuana, Mexico, on March 23. He spent 21 days in Mexico before Guatemalan Consul General was able to get him returned to his home in San Diego.
  - The United Nations Commission on Human Rights calls on Mexican and Central American governments to halt deportations during the coronavirus pandemic. 2,500 migrants are stuck in Panama because Honduras has closed its border. Mexico has dumped migrants in Guatemala, but Guatemala has not let them in. On April 23 the organization helped 41 migrants return to El Salvador from Mexico.
- April 23 – 26 – 2020 Pan Am Badminton Championships in Guatemala City.
- April 26 – Mexico′s National Institute of Migration (INM) empties the 65 migrant detention centers it has across the country by returning 3,653 people to Guatemala, El Salvador, and Honduras in the hope of preventing outbreaks of COVID-19.

=== May and June ===
- May 1 – Santa Catarina Palopó, Sololá Department, and other Maya communities spurn returned migrants, threatening some with burning their homes or lynching as fear spreads about more than 100 deportees from the United States who tested positive for the coronavirus. The U.S. Immigration and Customs Enforcement (ICE) has said deportees were screened for elevated temperatures and symptoms associated with COVID-19 before a plane with 89 Guatemalans, a dozen of them minors, arrived in the country on April 30.
- June 8 – U.S. Secretary of State Mike Pompeo announces that Gustavo Adolfo Alejos Cámbara, private secretary to former President Álvaro Colom (2008-2012) is ineligible for admission to the United States because of corruption. The ban also applies to Alejos Cámbara's family.

=== July to September ===
- July 29, 2019 – May – 2019–20 Liga Nacional de Guatemala.
- July 13 – COVID-19 pandemic: A report by The New York Times and the Marshall Project indicates that U.S. Immigration and Customs Enforcement (ICE) worsened the spread of the pandemic by deporting sick people to their countries of origin, including Guatemala. Guautemala is the only country that protested against the practice.
- July 21 – The Grupo de Apoyo Mutuo (GAM) says that during the first six months of 2020, 262 minors have been murdered, 138 with firearms. Choking was the second cause of death with 66, and drowning was third with 24. There have been 1,638 confirmed cases of COVID-19 among minors.
- July 24 – August 9 – Guatemala at the 2020 Summer Olympics.
- August 16 – Forty Qʼeqchiʼ families were forced to leave the Cubilgüitz coffee farm, which they had been occupying in protest for fifteen years, after an armed group set fire to several residences.
- August 18 – A 5.6 magnitude earthquake in Escuintla Department with no reports of damages of or injuries.
- August 19 – The United States deports 127 Guatemalans, all certified as having recuperated from COVID-19. 100 Guatemalans had been deported from Mexico on August 16. 4,392 Guatemalans have been deported from the two countries since April 1.
- August 22 – Dozens of protesters demand the resignation of President Alejandro Giammattei for mismanaging the response to the pandemic. Guatemala reports 67,856 cases of infection and 2,580 deaths.
- September 12 – COVID-19 pandemic: With nearly 3,000 deaths, more Guatemalans have died than in other counties in Central America. Guatemala is second in confirmed cases (81,909), behind Panama's 100,000. Overall, the public health situation seems to be improving, as La Aurora International Airport is due to open on September 18.
- September 15 – The Google Doodle is dedicated to Guatemala.
- September 18 – COVID-19 pandemic: President Alejandro Giammattei says he has tested positive for COVID-19. Guatemala reports 84,344 and 3,076 deaths.

=== October to December ===
- October 19 – Day of the 1944 Revolution
- November 20 – Vice President Guillermo Castillo says he and President Giammattei should both resign in opposition to the 2021 budget that calls for large cuts in social benefits.
- November 1 – All Saints' Day
- November 21 – 2020 Guatemalan protests begin.
- December 5 – Protesters demand the resignation of President Giammattei, Vice President Castillo, and Congressional leaders.
- December 25 – Christmas
- December 28 – The U.S. cuts military aid to El Salvador, Guatemala, and Honduras.

== Deaths ==
- January 2 – Ricardo Rosales Román, politician and guerrilla (b. 1934).
- April 18 – Erik Súñiga, politician (b. 1975).
- June 8 – Domingo Choc, Mayan spitirtual guide and natural medicine expert (b. 1934).
- June 14 – Haroldo Rodas, diplomat and politician, former Minister of Foreign Affairs (b. 1946).
- July 20 – Jorge Villavicencio, surgeon, former Minister of Public Health and Social Assistance (b. 1958).
- August 26 – Víctor Hugo Martínez Contreras, Roman Catholic prelate, former Archbishop of Los Altos Quetzaltenango-Totonicapán (b. 1930).
- August 30 – Rodolfo Abularach, painter (b. 1933).
- December 16 – Adela de Torrebiarte, 71, politician, Deputy (since 2020), President of the National Football Federation of Guatemala (2016–2017) and Minister of the Interior (2007–2008), lung cancer.

== See also ==
- 2020 in Central America
- 2020 coronavirus pandemic in Guatemala
- 2020 coronavirus pandemic in North America
- 2020 in Mexico
- 2020 in the Caribbean
- 2020 in politics and government
- 2020s
- 2020s in political history
- 2020 Atlantic hurricane season
