= 2015 in Guatemala =

- Decades: 1990s; 2000s; 2010s; 2020s
- See also: Other events of 2015; Timeline of Guatemalan history

The following lists events that happened during 2015 in Guatemala.

== Incumbents ==
- President: Otto Pérez Molina (until 3 September), Alejandro Maldonado (acting) (from 3 September)
- Vice President:
  - until 8 May: Roxana Baldetti
  - 8–14 May: Vacant
  - 14 May–3 September: Alejandro Maldonado
  - 3–16 September: Vacant
  - starting 16 September: Juan Alfonso Fuentes Soria

== Events ==
- March 11: Two journalists are murdered in Mazatenango.
- April 25-September 6: The 2015 Guatemalan protests take place, leading to the resignation of president Otto Pérez Molina.
