= Murder of Danilo López and Federico Salazar =

2015 murder of two journalists in Guatemala

Danilo López
- Born: ca. 1977
- Died: March 15, 2015; Mazatenango Park, Mazatenango, Suchitepéquez Department, Guatemala
- Cause of death: Shooting
- Occupation: Journalist
- Years active: 10
- Employer: Prensa Libre
- Organization: Suchitepequez Press Association
- Spouse: Wife
- Children: 5 year-old daughter and unborn child

Federico Salazar
- Born: c. 19??
- Died: March 15, 2015; Mazatenango Park, Mazatenango, Suchitepéquez Department, Guatemala
- Cause of death: Shooting
- Occupation: Radio journalist
- Years active: 3
- Employer: Radio Nuevo Mundo
- Organization: Suchitepequez Press Association

Murder of Danilo López and Federico Salazar is about the murders of two Guatemalan journalists that happened in Mazatenango Park, Mazatenango, located in the southern part of Suchitepéquez Department, Guatemala. Another journalist, Marvin Túnchez, was an injured victim of them same attack but survived. In the same area, camera operator Giovanni Guido Villatoro was killed in an unrelated crime just days after the deadly attack on the first three journalists.

== Death ==
The three journalists attacked were covering an event for International Women's Day. Two suspected gunmen on a motorbike killed two journalists and injured the other while in Mazatenango Park, Mazatenango, Guatemala. The attack occurred at approximately 12:45 p.m., 10 March 2015. In all four shots were fired by the gunman. Danilo López was shot twice and died on the scene. Frederico Salazar was shot in the back and died later at the hospital. Marvin Túnchez was injured by one shot fired in the incident.

According to Túnchez, López was the intended target of the attack. Lopez identified the source of threats against him as coming from José Linares Rojas, mayor of San Lorenzo, Suchitepéquez. The mayor was said to have made this threat as early as July 2013, which was reported on then by Prensa Libre with the headline, "Mayor Threatens Journalist". López repeated this claim in an interview in February 2014 and the Guatemala Human Rights Commission also made this claim after his murder.

== Victims ==
Danilo Efraín Zapón López studied at Universidad de San Carlos de Guatemala. He was survived by his 5-year-old daughter, and his wife was pregnant at the time of his murder. López was a reporter for the Guatemala City daily Prensa Libre for about 10 years. He covered politics, sports and other news but he often reported on corruption with politicians and use of public funds. He had been receiving threats since 2013 but had called the attorney general's office for assistance an hour before the attack.

Federico Salazar was a reporter and radio journalist for the Guatemala City station Nuevo Mundo radio for the last 3 years.

Both López and Salazar were leaders of the Suchitepequez Press Association in Guatemala. López was its vice-president. Salazar served as its secretary.

Marvin Túnchez is a reporter for a local Canal 30 cable TV station on channel 23 in Guatemala. He also reported for a newspaper called Publinews.

== Perpetrators ==
Shortly after the murder on 10 March, police arrested two suspects in connection to the murders of López and Salazar. An image of the two fleeing the scene on a motorcycle was captured on video at the event. The first occurred hours after the attack when Sergio Valdemar Cardona Reyes, 31, considered a suspect, was arrested on a blue motorcycle in Cuyotenango, Suchitepéquez Department. He was accused at his hearing of being the driver. Later, Artemio de Jesús Ramírez Torres, alias "El Barbas" or "Fluff", 29, was captured by police in the village of El Carmen, Champerico, Retalhuleu Department. He was accused at his hearing of being the shooter.

The prosecution said in March the identities of the source who ordered the attack was still under investigation. In June 2015, three more suspects were arrested in connection with the murder, including two members of the Policía Nacional Civil de Guatemala. They were Jorge León Cabrera Solís and Artemio de Jesús Juárez Pichiyá. The prosecutor said Juárez Pichiyá's phone number was linked with the suspected perpetrators. The third arrested was German Amílcar Morataya Beltrán.

== Context ==
Mentioned locations within Guatemala relative to the capital Guatemala City.

Guatemala and Honduras rank high among countries in Central America with the most unsolved murders involving journalists. Many arrests have been made but no convictions.

Guatemala is historically one of the most dangerous countries for journalists. According to the Guatemala Human Rights Commission, 342 journalists were killed over the 36 years of the Guatemalan Civil War. More recently, 2014 World Press Freedom Index ranked Guatemala 125 out of 180 countries. The committee to Protect Journalists lists 22 journalists who have been killed confirmed or unconfirmed as a result of their journalism in Guatemala since 1992. The Inter American Press Association (IAPA) reported during Guatemalan President Otto Pérez Molina's government alone, seven journalists have been killed, four in 2013 and three on the week of 10 March 2015. From 2012 to 2015 during his term, there have been more than 200 attacks against journalists.

== Impact ==
Danilo López received a number of threats from politicians throughout his career. The Unit for the Protection of Human Rights Defenders in Guatemala revealed that López first reported being threatened in 2008, when the ex-governor of the department of Suchitepéquez, Leonor Toledo allegedly threatened him by phone following critical reports of the department's management. Another article by López in 2011 caused then-mayor of Mazatenango, Juan Manuel Delgado, to attack the journalist in the street.

== Reactions ==
Irina Bokova, director-general of UNESCO, said, "The cold-blooded murder of Danilo Lopez and Federico Salazar must not go unpunished. Press freedom and freedom of expression are backbones to democratic societies, where citizens can count on being kept informed, where they have a voice. Defending these rights means journalists must be able to work without fearing for their lives. Criminals must know that their acts will be punished."

Guatemala Human Rights Commission said, "The Guatemalan government is directly responsible for these assassinations; its inaction has allowed previous attacks against journalists to remain unsolved. This impunity has opened the door for countless cases of spurious criminal charges to be made against journalist and, as a result, there has been an increase in the censure and silencing of journalists. The government has been negligent in the development of a Protection Program for Human Rights Defenders..."

Miguel Ángel Méndez Zetina, director of Prensa Libre, said, "We're alerting the international community that it's time that as Guatemalans we be more concerned about the terrible climate of insecurity and ungovernability that we are experiencing in this country."

== Memorial ==
A memorial was constructed at the park where the two journalists were murdered.

== See also ==
- List of journalists killed in Guatemala
