= 2018 in Guatemala =

- Decades: 1990s; 2000s; 2010s; 2020s
- See also: Other events of 2018; Timeline of Guatemalan history

The following lists events in the year 2018 in Guatemala.

== Incumbents ==
- President: Jimmy Morales
- Vice-President: Jafeth Cabrera

== Events ==
=== January ===
- 14 January – President Morales presents his second government report and begins his second term in government amid corruption allegations and protests with Álvaro Arzú Escobar taking office as President of the Congress, despite also being accused of corruption.
- 23 January – President Morales dismisses allegations of embezzlement after questions relating to his spending on high cost luxury items.
- 26 January – Williams Mansilla, former Defense Minister, is arrested for possible corruption in collusion with President Morales with the Attorney General requesting another Supreme Court consideration to impeach Morales.

=== February ===
- 13 February – Former President Alvaro Colom and his entire cabinet were arrested for alleged involved in corruption cases being investigated by the CICIG and detained at the Mariscal Zavala Military Center.

=== April ===
- 1 April – Former President Efrain Rios Montt dies ending the trials of genocide against him.
- 15 April – Guatemalan territorial dispute referendum, 2018, on whether the Guatemalan government should request the International Court of Justice to finally resolve the Belizean–Guatemalan territorial dispute.

=== June ===
- 3 June – Volcán de Fuego Eruption up in air, 38 people dies, 100 injured report, last time bigger Eruption since 1974.

== Deaths ==
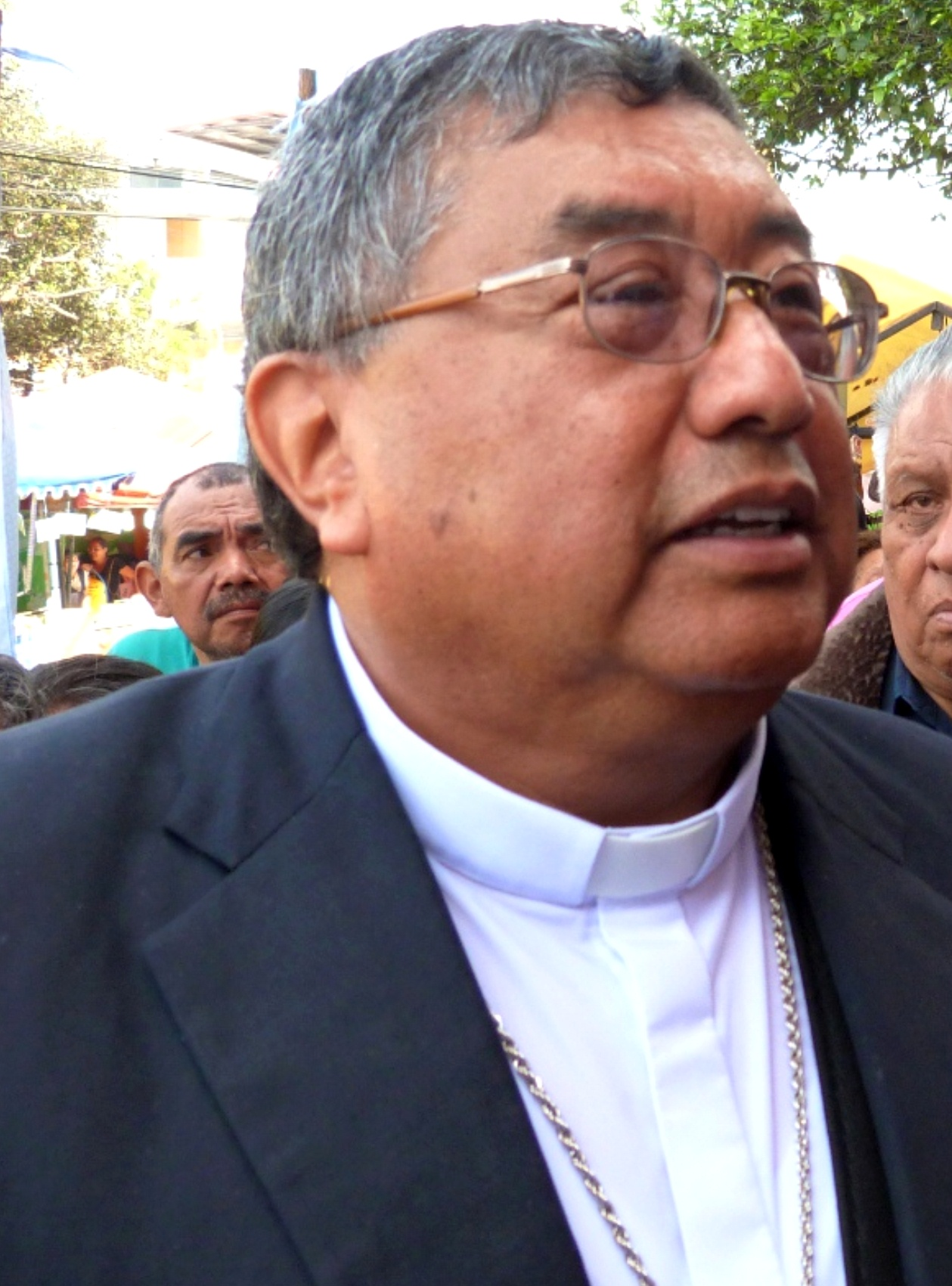
Óscar Julio Vian Morales

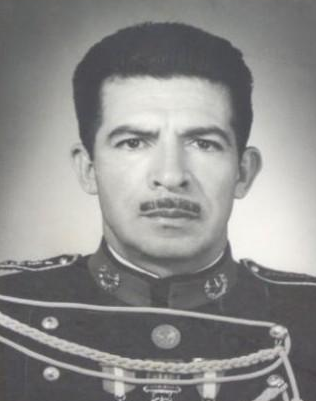
Efraín Ríos Montt

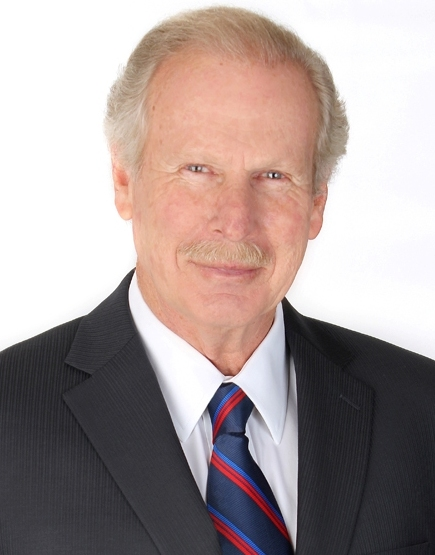
Álvaro Arzú

- 18 February – Elmar Rojas, artist (born 1941).
- 24 February – Óscar Julio Vian Morales, Roman Catholic prelate (born 1947)
- 31 March – Margarita Carrera, philosopher, professor and writer (born 1929)
- 1 April – Efraín Ríos Montt, military officer, President (1982–1983) (born 1926).
- 27 April – Álvaro Arzú, politician, President (1996–2000) (born 1946).
- 25 December – Felipe Gomez Alonzo, 8, Guatemalan refugee who died while in the custody of U.S. Immigration and Customs Enforcement in El Paso, Texas; influenza
