= 1979 in Guatemala =

- Decades: 1950s; 1960s; 1970s; 1980s; 1990s
- See also: Other events of 1979; Timeline of Guatemalan history

The following lists events that happened during 1979 in the Republic of Guatemala.

== Incumbents ==
- President: Fernando Romeo Lucas García
- Vice President: Francisco Villagrán Kramer

== births ==
- March 9 – Oscar Isaac, Guatemalan-American actor
