= 2023-2024 Guatemalan political crisis =

2023–2024 Guatemalan political crisis
- Part of the 2023 Guatemalan general election
- Results (by department) of the first round of elections. After the vote count, Arévalo surprisingly advanced to the runoff
- Date: 25 June 2023 – 15 January 2024
- Location: Guatemala
- Caused by: Accusations of electoral fraud, promoted by National Unity of Hope and other political parties; Proclamation of Bernardo Arévalo as president-elect of Guatemala
- Result: A judge's order to outlaw the Semilla Movement and the awarding of its positions; Actions of the Public Prosecutor's Office regarding fraud allegations; Attempts by political actors to overturn the election results; Raids by the Public Prosecutor's Office at the facilities of the Supreme Electoral Tribunal; Accusations of a coup d'état by the elected authorities

Lead figures
Irma Palencia; Blanca Alfaro; Mynor Franco; Gabriel Aguilera; Bernardo Arévalo; Karin Herrera	Sandra Torres; María Consuelo Porras; Rafael Curruchiche; Fredy Orellana

Units involved
(Guatemala) Supreme Electoral Tribunal; (Guatemala) Movimiento Semilla; Organization of American States; European Union; United Nations; United States	Public Prosecutor's Office; Vamos; National Unity of Hope

Casualties
- Deaths: 53 killed
- Injuries: 1,080 injured

The political crisis in Guatemala arose after the preliminary results of the first round of elections were made public on 25 June 2023, in which, surprisingly Bernardo Arévalo came in second place behind Sandra Torres and advanced to the second round to be held on August 20. During the electoral process, polls did not identify Arévalo's rise, despite high popular discontent with the "political class"; it is likely that the events of the day before the elections influenced the popular vote for someone who, a few months earlier, had been an unknown candidate.

The main parties alleged electoral fraud in the counting of data to the electronic system and requested a recount which was granted by the country's Courts, having failed to reverse the results, the Public Ministry announced a court order establishing the suspension of the Movimiento Semilla party and the non-awarding of its elected positions, which put the second round of elections at risk.

After the official announcement of the results and the proclamation of Bernardo Arévalo as president-elect, the Public Prosecutor's Office raided the electoral offices following claims of alleged "fraud" made by the National Unity of Hope (UNE) party, which refused to accept the election results. Furthermore, they have requested the removal of immunity from prosecution for the magistrates of the Supreme Electoral Tribunal (TSE) due to alleged irregularities in the Preliminary Electoral Results Transmission (TREP) system.

On 8 December 2023, the Public Prosecutor's Office declared that the electoral records used in the elections "are null and void" since "they were not authorized" beforehand by the Supreme Electoral Tribunal, thus annulling the elections for president, deputies, mayor, and deputies to the Central American Parliament.

== Development ==
On 26 June, the results were accepted by contenders Zury Ríos and Edmond Mulet, who in the polls appeared to be strong contenders against Torres in the second round. Despite this, days later, Ríos removed the post in which she expressed her concession.

Preliminary results of the general elections indicated that Sandra Torres of the National Unity of Hope (UNE) and Bernardo Arévalo of the Movimiento Semilla would compete in the second round, while the ruling party' Manuel Conde Orellana of Vamos, was in third place. However, the certification of the results was delayed due to a controversial injunction granted by the Constitutional Court (CC) to nine right-wing parties, including the ruling Vamos party. These parties challenged the result alleging "irregularities" and "electoral fraud" in favor of Arévalo, even going so far as to request a new election or a recount of the votes.

The Court ordered a new review of the disputed ballots, which was carried out during the first week of July and did not reflect major changes in the preliminary results; in fact, in some polling stations, the votes for Arévalo increased. Despite this, the losing parties intensified their narrative of fraud and alleged that the Court's order had not been followed. The Supreme Court of Justice rejected the parties' request for an injunction to recount the ballots at the polling stations and declared that the official announcement of the results was likely to be delayed. From then on, the Supreme Electoral Tribunal was authorized to officially announce the results and hold the second round between Torres and Arévalo.

=== Case against the winning party ===
On 12 July 2023, the Supreme Electoral Tribunal officially announced the results and confirmed that Torres and Arévalo would compete in the second round. However, at the same time, Public Prosecutor Rafael Curruchiche announced that, at the request of the Special Prosecutor's Office Against Impunity, Judge Fredy Orellana had ordered the suspension of the legal status of the Semilla Movement due to an alleged case of forged signatures of members for the formation of the political party. He also ordered the electoral tribunal to suspend the political party and, consequently, to suspend its eligibility for any elected office in which it had participated, announcing the decision almost as a celebration. Both the Supreme Electoral Tribunal and legal experts stated that the judge did not act in accordance with the Law on Elections and Political Parties and that his measure jeopardized the development of the second round of elections because it prevented the party from participating. They also suggested that the intention was likely to remove Arévalo from the race. In response, the Semilla Movement filed an appeal with the Constitutional Court to overturn the judge's order. The Court granted the appeal provisionally, and Semilla remained in the second round, which it won with 61% of the vote. From then on, demonstrations were organized to demand the resignation of Attorney General María Consuelo Porras, Prosecutor Curruchiche, and Judge Orellana.

Days after the second round, the director of the Citizens Registry was pressured to suspend the winning party. He did so at the end of August, but the full Supreme Electoral Tribunal (TSE) suspended the order because the electoral process was still underway according to the decree calling for the elections. This led to suggestions among the tribunal's magistrates to extend the decree to prevent actions by the Attorney General's Office from hindering the elected officials from taking office. However, they did not do so because ending the decree was a way to ensure the election results.

With the electoral process officially concluded on 31 October 2023, the Citizens Registry issued a suspension resolution against the Semilla Movement party. It is believed this was under pressure from the Attorney General's Office, as they had previously requested the removal of immunity from the Director General of that body. Immediately, the FECI notified Congress that the party's parliamentary group would lose its status and, consequently, some positions on committees. It had also done so in August, but on that occasion, Congress did dissolve the group, appointing the deputies as independents.

=== UNE reaction to the results ===
After the second round in which Arévalo was elected with 61% of the vote, Sandra Torres did not appear before the media again after her last statement at midday on election day, where she alleged irregularities in the process. On Friday, 25 August, the UNE executive committee filed a complaint against the Electoral Tribunal, alleging that the Preliminary Electoral Results Transmission (TREP) system failed and presented irregularities such as: tally sheets uploaded before the election ended, votes that did not physically match the system, duplicate ballots, and more tally sheets than the number of polling stations; however, this was due to the fact that the TSE also held municipal elections in five municipalities.

On 12 September, the Public Prosecutor's Office raided the headquarters where the Supreme Electoral Tribunal (TSE) had stored the boxes containing the ballots and tally sheets with the election results, following an alleged complaint from "a citizen" who claimed that the actual results did not match those published in the Preliminary Results Transmission System (TREP) despite the fact that the TSE had explained many times that this was only an information system and that the official results were based on the physical tally sheets. The Public Prosecutor's Office remained at the site for two days, and media outlets filmed prosecutors counting votes without any formal procedures, breaking the established security measures.

In November, an audio recording of the hearing in which the search warrant was requested was released, and in which prosecutors emphasized the need to recount the votes. The request stemmed from a complaint filed by activist Giovanni Fratti, a member of the organization Guatemala Inmortal, who has denounced "fraud" in his columns. As a result, members of the Prosecutor's Office requested authorization from the judge to search the warehouse where the ballots and electoral records were stored, with the aim of analyzing them. The Prosecutor's Office carried out the search and seized all the original records despite the opposition of magistrates who asserted that from that point forward they could no longer vouch for their contents.

=== Persecution of judges ===
In September, the Public Prosecutor's Office (MP) filed a request to lift the immunity of all magistrates in response to an investigation stemming from a complaint filed by political parties and the UNE (National Unity of Hope party). The investigation began in July, and according to the MP, the data transmission system presented irregularities both in its operation and in its acquisition. Several right-wing civil organizations also filed complaints against magistrates and officials of the Supreme Electoral Tribunal alleging irregular or overpriced purchases.

In early November, the Supreme Court of Justice of Guatemala, composed of substitute magistrates, forwarded the request to Congress. The full Congress reviewed it before the end of the first half of the month and appointed a committee to analyse it and issue a recommendation to the members of Congress. The committee was chaired by Enrique Montano and included four other congressmen. However, three of them (Flavio Muñoz, Douglas Rivero, and Julio Longo) pressured the committee to deliver the report to the full Congress before November 30, the last day of the ordinary sessions. Therefore, the committee only had seven days to analyse the file. The Constitutional Court declared that President Blanca Alfaro and the three substitute magistrates could not be included, as Alfaro had voted against acquiring the computer system and the other three had not participated in the vote.

During the proceedings, it was discovered that the complaint had been filed by conservative lawyers Giovanni Fratti and Karen Fisher (former daughter-in-law of Jorge Carpio Nicolle) who did not attend the first session and requested a rescheduling. Both alleged "fraud"; when questioned, they claimed they were referring to tax fraud. Fisher said that Congress should hurry because 14 January, the date of the inauguration, was approaching; the magistrates of the Supreme Electoral Tribunal also requested an extension, but it was denied. Magistrate Irma Palencia was even unable to defend herself because she could not attend the hearing. The commission recommended removing immunity with three votes in favor and two against (from Montano and Osmundo Ponce), and the following day, Congress received the report in a prepared manner but did not achieve the cuórum of 107 to begin the vote to remove their immunity. That day they approved the 2024 General Budget and almost at midnight, by motion, they began the vote in which they obtained 108 affirmative votes to remove the immunity of: Irma Palencia, Rafael Rojas, Mynor Franco and Gabriel Aguilera, in which they managed to convince four at the last minute during the course of the vote.

The following day, the four sitting magistrates requested leave and vacation; they immediately left the country, the last to leave being Palencia, two days later. From that moment the TSE was effectively dissolved because the full court is composed of five magistrates and only four were available (one sitting magistrate and three alternates) because Congress had not elected the other two alternate magistrates, whose positions had been vacant for months.

== Reactions ==
The constant judicialization of the elections has been widely criticized by various national and international organizations, including the Supreme Electoral Tribunal, civil society, the private sector, non-governmental organizations, the media, the Catholic Church, the Electoral Observation Mission in Guatemala, the United Nations, the Organization of American States, the United States, the United Kingdom, and European and Latin American countries, which called for respect for the verdict of the ballot box, denied the accusations of fraud, and affirmed that the results coincided with their observations. They also condemned the attempt to outlaw the Semilla party. In a bipartisan statement, the United States Congress called on President Joe Biden to impose sanctions against those responsible for “threatening democracy” in Guatemala. Around twenty conservative former presidents from Spain and Latin America issued a joint statement condemning the attempt to disqualify Arévalo and his party, comparing it to the recent disqualification of Venezuelan opposition leader María Corina Machado. The Argentine journalist Andrés Oppenheimer described the accusations of electoral fraud in Guatemala as an attempted "coup d'état," comparing them to Donald Trump's attempts to overturn the results of the 2020 United States presidential election.

For its part, the Public Prosecutor's Office has defended itself by stating that it does not intend to "interfere" or "disqualify" the participation of the candidates and the inauguration of those elected.

On 18 December 2023, the European Union in Guatemala issued a statement highlighting the current problems in Guatemala, considering the direct involvement of Attorney General María Consuelo Porras, Special Prosecutor against Impunity José Rafael Curruchiche, Judge Fredy Raúl Orellana Letona, Prosecutor Cinthia Edelmira Monterroso Gómez, Prosecutor Leonor Morales, and the Secretary of the Public Prosecutor's Office Ángel Pineda, all of whom were already on the "List of Corrupt and Anti-Democratic Actors" compiled and issued by the United States. Taking into account that, as signatories to the Association Agreement between the European Union and Central America, the "respect for democratic principles and fundamental human rights" is included as an "essential element" of the foundations that underpin the agreements, the European Union condemned the Public Prosecutor's Office's continued efforts to invalidate the results of the general and presidential elections based on unfounded accusations of alleged fraud, thus attempting a coup d'état. The European Parliament calls on its Council to immediately adopt specific restrictive measures against these individuals and calls on the Guatemalan authorities, in particular the Public Prosecutor's Office, to refrain from any attempt to obstruct the work of human rights defenders, justice operators, and journalists, expressing its concern about the arbitrary detention of prosecutors, judges, former officials of the International Commission against Impunity in Guatemala (CICIG), and independent journalists, the closure of elPeriodico, and the persecution of José Rubén Zamora, among other issues, and expresses its support for the ongoing work carried out by the OAS Special Mission to assist with the presidential transition, in accordance with the mandate of the OAS Permanent Council.

== See also ==
- 2023 Guatemalan general election
- List of political parties in Guatemala
- Supreme Electoral Tribunal (Guatemala)
