= 2021 in Guatemala =

- Decades: 2000s; 2010s; 2020s
- See also: Other events of 2021; Timeline of Guatemalan history

The following lists events in the year 2021 in Guatemala.

== Incumbents ==
- President:Alejandro Eduardo Giammattei Falla (since 2020)
- Vice-president: César Guillermo Castillo Reyes (since 2020)

== Events ==
Ongoing – COVID-19 pandemic in Guatemala

=== January and February ===
- January 14 – Guatemalan troops, police, and health workers set up 16 checkpoints to stop migrants.
- January 15 – A magnitude 5.9 earthquake with an epicenter located 5 kilometres (3 mi) south-southwest of Champerico at a depth of 10 km (6 mi) shakes buildings in Guatemala City, but no damage or injuries are reported.
- January 29 – The Argentine Forensic Anthropology Team (EAAF) and the International Committee of the Red Cross (ICRC) offer to help identify 19 migrants believed to be Guatemalan nationals murdered in Tamaulipas, Mexico, on January 23.
- February 5 – An agreement wherein asylum–seekers are forced to wait in Guatemala until they receive a hearing is canceled by the Biden administration.
- February 18 – Mexico and Guatemala sign an agreement to return 16 bodies identified as Guatemalan migrants in the massacre in Santa Anita, Camargo, Tamaulipas, on January 22.
- February 19 – Thousands of farmers march to demand the resignations of President Alejandro Giammattei and Attorney General Consuelo Porras for corruption.
- February 22 – Outrage after it is revealed that health officials spent US$1,000,000 to purchase 30,000 fake COVID-19 tests. Guatemala has had 171,289 infections and 6,306 deaths related to the virus.
- February 25 – Survivors of the Guatemalan Civil War march to demand justice on the ″National Day of Dignity for Victims of the Internal Armed Conflict″. “This day carries so much meaning. It honors our dead,” said Rigoberta Menchu.

=== March and April ===
- March 4 – Villagers near Pacaya ignore an evacuation request as the volcano throws ashes into the air.
- March 8
  - A thousand women and men march in Guatemala City demanding an end to violence against women on International Women's Day.
  - Judge Erika Aifan of the High-Risk Criminal Court is awarded the International Women of Courage Award.
- March 29
  - Seven Mexican soldiers are being held in La Esperanza, Tacaná, San Marcos Department, after a 30-year-old Guatemalan was killed in Mazapa de Madero, Chiapas, Mexico. The incident is being investigated as a murder.
  - President Giammattei decrees a “state of prevention” along the border with Honduras amid reports that a new migrant caravan may be forming in Honduras.
- March 30 – President Giammattei and U.S. Vice President Kamala Harris agree to work together on immigration issues after a phone call.

=== May and June ===
- June 7 – U.S. vice president Kamala Harris visits President Alejandro Giammattei to discuss immigration.

== Scheduled events ==
- March 28–April 3 — Holy Week.
- May 10 – Mother's Day
- September 15 – Independence Day, 200th anniversary of the Act of Independence of Central America.
- November 1 – All Saints' Day.

== Culture ==
- March 1 – The French/Guatemalan movie La Lollorona is nominated for a Golden Globe Award.
- March 5 – El Universal reports that traditional black salt is likely soon to be a thing of the past as only one person, named Don Maximilano, who is over 70 years old, knows how to prepare it.

== Sports ==
- TBA – 2020–21 Liga Nacional de Guatemala

== Deaths ==
- February 11 – Rubén Alfonso Ramírez, 84, television presenter and politician, Minister of Education (2015–2016).
- March 6 – Herbert Meneses, 81, actor (Sólo de noche vienes, The Silence of Neto).

== See also ==
- COVID-19 pandemic in North America
- 2020s
- 2020s in political history
- 2021 Atlantic hurricane season
