= 2020 Guatemalan protests =

Protests

- Part of COVID-19 pandemic in Guatemala, Hurricane Eta and Hurricane Iota
- Date: 21 November 2020
- Location: Guatemala City (and other areas within the country)
- Caused by: 2021 budget bill passed by Congress; Effects of COVID-19; Aftermath of Hurricanes Eta and Iota
- Goals: Demand veto of 2021 budget bill by President Alejandro Giammattei; Call for resignation of legislators in Congress
- Methods: Civil disorder; Nonviolent resistance
- Result: Use of tear gas by security forces; Damage to the National Congress building

Parties
(Guatemala) Guatemalan Protesters	Government of Guatemala; Guatemala Police

On November 21, 2020, protests began in Guatemala City and several other parts of the country in response to the passing of a controversial budget bill by Congress in the midst of the COVID-19 pandemic and the aftermath of Hurricanes Eta and Iota. More than 7,000 protesters gathered in the capital city to demonstrate against the bill, which included cuts to education and health spending and increased funding for meals and expenses for lawmakers. During the protests in Guatemala City, social media reports showed a fire burning inside a window of the National Congress building.

== Background ==
At the time of the protests, Guatemala was dealing with the effects of Hurricanes Eta and Iota, back-to-back storms that brought torrential rains to the country, and the COVID-19 pandemic. The storms caused landslides that buried more than 100 Indigenous people and caused crop damage across the country. During this time, Congress passed a budget bill that cut spending for COVID-19 patients and human rights agencies. The protesters claimed that this bill was passed while the country was distracted by national disasters. The bill also increased the legislator's stipend for meals and expenses while cutting $25 million from the budget earmarked to fight malnutrition in the country. The budget also cut spending for the judiciary.

On November 20, 2020, Vice President Guillermo Castillo called for himself and President Alejandro Giammattei to resign. Castillo said he would not resign unless the president did so as well.

== Protests ==
On November 21, 2020, more than 7,000 people gathered in protest in Guatemala City, the capital of Guatemala. Hundreds of protesters also gathered in other parts of the country. University students led a protest that began four blocks away from the National Congress. Once they arrived at the plaza in front of the building, they set up a guillotine. Protesters called on President Giammattei to veto the 2021 budget bill. They also called for the resignation of 125 of the 160 legislators in Congress. Uniformed police officers stood by as protesters climbed the front of the National Congress building, broke windows, and threw in incendiary devices. After the building was set on fire, the security forces fired tear gas in an attempt to disperse the crowd. Several people were injured. Firefighters arrived to stop the fire. The building, which was empty at the time, was on fire for about 10 minutes but the extent of the damage is not yet known.

The protests also included peaceful demonstrations in the nation's capital. Among the targets of the protesters was the Supreme Court of Justice which recently withdrew immunity from prosecution for constitutional magistrates. The magistrates had blocked efforts by politicians to stop investigations into corruption in the government. Attorney General María Consuelo Porras was also targeted for requesting the withdrawal of immunity for the constitutional magistrates.

== Reaction ==
President Giammattei condemned the events, saying: "I reiterate that people have the right to protest as allowed by law. But we cannot permit public and private property to be vandalised." He warned that anyone identified to have participated in causing the fire would be prosecuted to the fullest extent of the law.
