= Hugo Rodríguez Chinchilla =

Guatemalan politician (1975–2023)

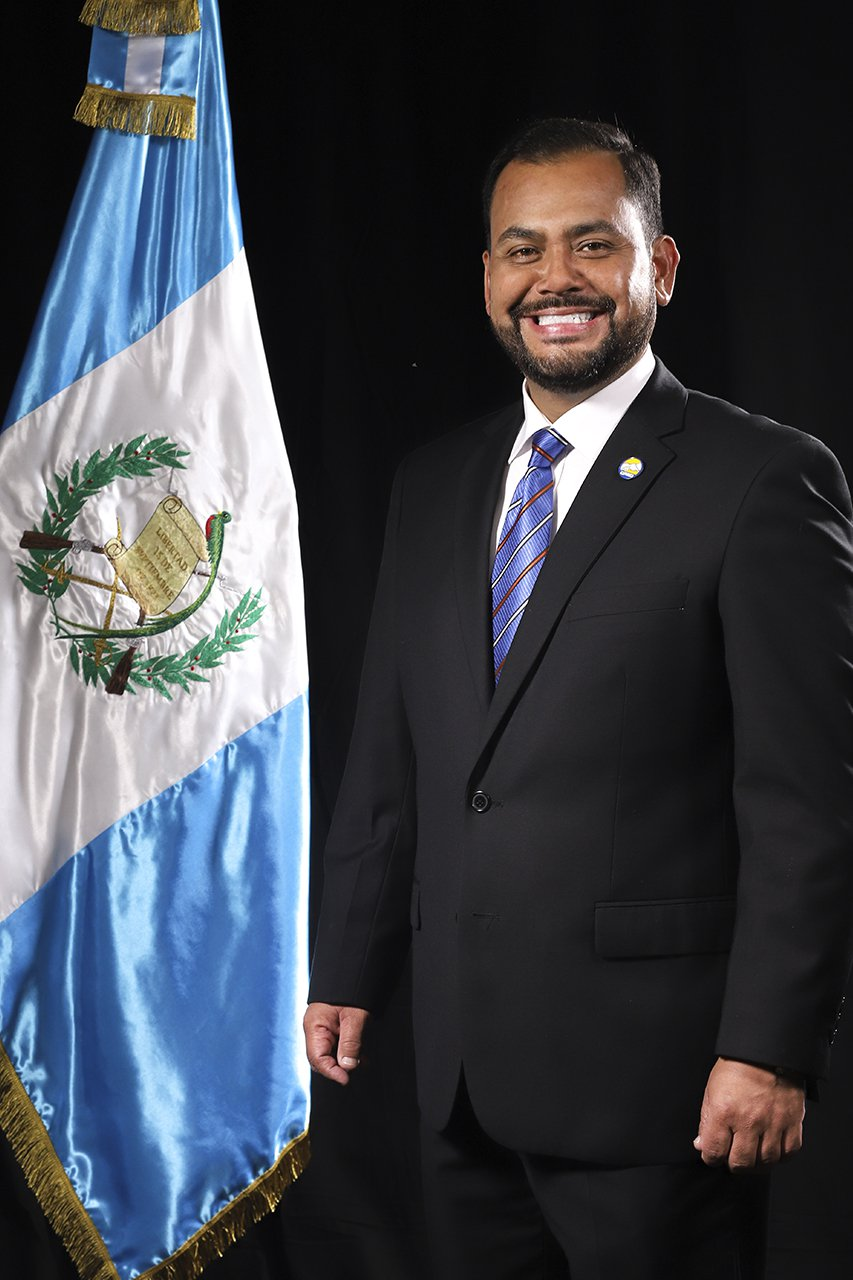
- Official portrait

Member of the Congress of Guatemala
- In office 14 January 2020 – 5 April 2023
- Succeeded by: Yesmín María Poroj Orellana

Personal details
- Born: Hugo Otoniel Rodríguez Chinchilla; 5 October 1975; Guatemala
- Died: 5 April 2023 (aged 47); Guatemala City, Guatemala
- Political party: Commitment, Renewal and Order

Hugo Otoniel Rodríguez Chinchilla (5 October 1975 – 5 April 2023) was a Guatemalan politician who served as a deputy of the Congress of Guatemala for the Central District from January 2020 until his death in April 2023. Rodríguez was a member of the political party Commitment, Renewal and Order (CREO).

== Early life ==
Rodríguez was born on 5 October 1975.

== Political career ==
In the 2015 municipal elections, Rodríguez was elected as fifth councilor of the Municipality of Chinautla, Guatemala Department, for the Patriotic Party (PP), from 2016 to 2020.

Rodríguez ranked second in the list of candidates for deputies for the Central District of the Commitment, Renewal and Order (CREO) party in the 2019 legislative elections. He was elected as a deputy and took office on 14 January 2020 as part of the IX Legislature of Congress. As a member of Congress, Rodríguez was a member of several high-level parliamentary commissions such as Communications, Transportation and Public Works, National Defense, Labor, and the Interior, among others. At the time of his death, he was chairman of the Communications, Transportation and Public Works Commission. He was also a speaker for various bills, the most relevant of which was one that sought to compensate each military veteran who served during the Guatemalan Civil War.

At the beginning of 2023, it was announced that Rodríguez would seek re-election as deputy for the same district, occupying the first position on the CREO list for the 2023 general elections.

== Death ==
Rodríguez died on 5 April 2023, in Guatemala City due to consequences related to pneumonia. It was known that he had been affected by pneumonia several days before and for this reason he was admitted to a care center. The said disease had caused damage to his lung, his state of health worsened and caused him two heart attacks.

His fellow bench members, as well as other deputies and the president of Congress Shirley Rivera expressed their condolences through social networks. Rodríguez was the fourth deputy to die in office in the IX Legislature, as well as the second CREO deputy to die in office during said legislature (the first was Adela de Torrebiarte in 2020).
