= 2024 in Guatemala =

- Decades: 2000s; 2010s; 2020s
- See also: Other events of 2024; Timeline of Guatemalan history

The following lists events in the year 2024 in Guatemala.

== Incumbents ==
- President: Alejandro Giammattei (until 15 January); Bernardo Arévalo onwards
- Vice-President: Guillermo Castillo Reyes (until 15 January); Karin Herrera onwards

== Events ==
=== January ===
- 11 January: 2023 Guatemalan general election:
  - Former Minister of the Interior Napoleón Barrientos is arrested for failing to comply with his duties for not using force to evict the blockades and demonstrations that occurred in October, which called for the resignation of Attorney General María Consuelo Porras.
  - The Public Ministry orders the arrest of four magistrates of the Supreme Electoral Tribunal who have been living in exile since losing their immunity in November.
  - Vice President-elect Karin Herrera presents a legal appeal before the Constitutional Court due to the risk of a possible arrest warrant against her, thereby violating her immunity.
- 14 January: Bernardo Arévalo is inaugurated as President of Guatemala.

=== February ===
- 2 February: The European Council applies sanctions to Attorney General of Guatemala María Consuelo Porras and three of her collaborators, as well as a judge, for undermining democracy, the rule of law and the transfer of power.

=== April ===
- 10 April: President Arévalo declares a state of national disaster due to 44 wildfires raging across the country.

=== May ===
- 12 May: A magnitude 6.4 earthquake strikes along the Guatemala–Mexico border, causing damage in Quetzaltenango and San Marcos Departments.

=== June ===
- 17 June: Three people are killed during floods in Jalpatagua.

=== July ===
- 12 July: President Arévalo makes an official apology on behalf of the Guatemalan state to victims of widespread illegal adoptions during the 1990s and 2000s.
- 24 July: Authorities announce the arrival of 600 refugees from Mexico fleeing drug-related violence in Chiapas.
- 29 July: The Guatemalan government grants temporary resident permits to over 200 Mexicans, mostly children, on humanitarian grounds as they escape drug violence.

=== August ===
- 13 August: Ligia Hernández, the head of the national victims’ advocacy agency, is arrested on charges of failing to provide financial disclosures during a previous political campaign.
- 21 August: Seven people are arrested following police raids in three departments on suspicion of human trafficking and involvement in the 2022 San Antonio migrant deaths in Texas.

=== September ===
- 24 September: President Arévalo announces plans to deploy 150 military police officers to Haiti to help in operations against the country's gang war.

=== October ===
- 18 October: Investigative journalist José Rubén Zamora, whose imprisonment for money laundering was criticized by human rights groups as politically motivated, is moved to house arrest following a court order. The decision is overturned on 15 November following an appeal.

=== November ===
- 14 November : The Inter-American Court of Human Rights rules that the Guatemalan government was responsible for the forced disappearance of four Indigenous human rights activists in 1989 that was blamed on the Guatemalan Army.

=== December ===
- 20 December: Authorities conduct a raid on a farm compound in Oratorio against the Lev Tahor sect, an extremist ultra-Orthodox Jewish group with a history of legal issues across various countries, following reports of severe child abuse, including forced pregnancies, mistreatment, and rape.

== Holidays ==
- 1 January – New Year's Day
- 28 –30 March – Holy Week
- 1 May – Labour Day
- 1 July – Army Day
- 15 September – Independence Day
- 20 October – Guatemalan Revolution
- 1 November – All Saints' Day
- 25 December – Christmas Day

== Deaths ==
- 18 January: Silent Servant, 46, Guatemalan-born American techno DJ and producer.
- 18 May: Francisco Villagrán de León, 70, diplomat, academic and presidential advisor, ambassador to the United States (2008–2011, 2012–2013)
- 21 September: Raquel Blandón, 81, politician and lawyer, first lady (1986–1991)
