= 2017 in Guatemala =

- Decades: 1990s; 2000s; 2010s; 2020s
- See also: Other events of 2017; Timeline of Guatemalan history

The following lists events that will happen or have happened during 2017 in Guatemala

== Incumbents ==
- President: Jimmy Morales
- Vice-President: Jafeth Cabrera
