= Guatemala Pride =

Annual LGBTQ event in Guatemala

Guatemala City LGBT Pride March
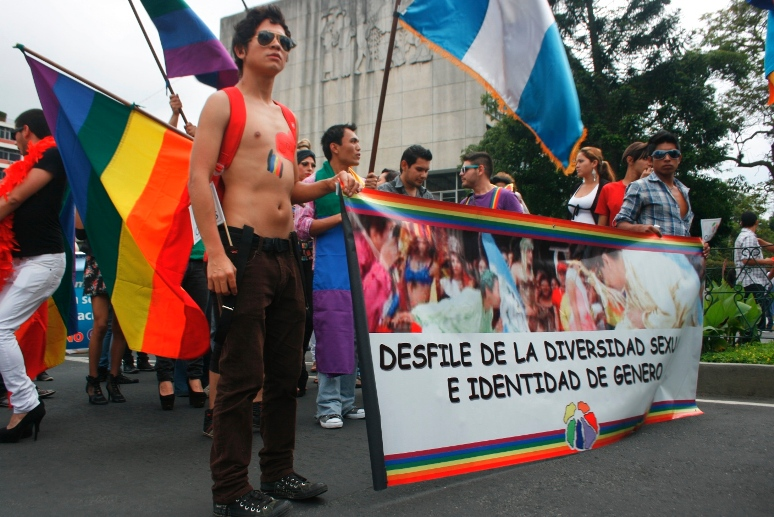
- LGBT Pride March in Guatemala City
- Date: Annually around June 25
- Location: Guatemala City, Guatemala
- Type: Pride march
- Cause: Commemoration of International LGBT Pride Day
- First march held on June 25, 2000

The Sexual Diversity and Gender Identity Parade of Guatemala, also known as the Guatemala Pride, is an LGBT Pride demonstration held annually in Guatemala City to advocate for the rights of LGBT communities. The event was first held in 2000 and brings together thousands of participants each year, making it one of the most widely attended recurring events in the country.

The parade is organized collaboratively by dozens of Guatemalan LGBT organizations and features floats, artistic performances, and dances that take place along the route. Participants often march while displaying LGBT flags, and many wear costumes.

== History ==
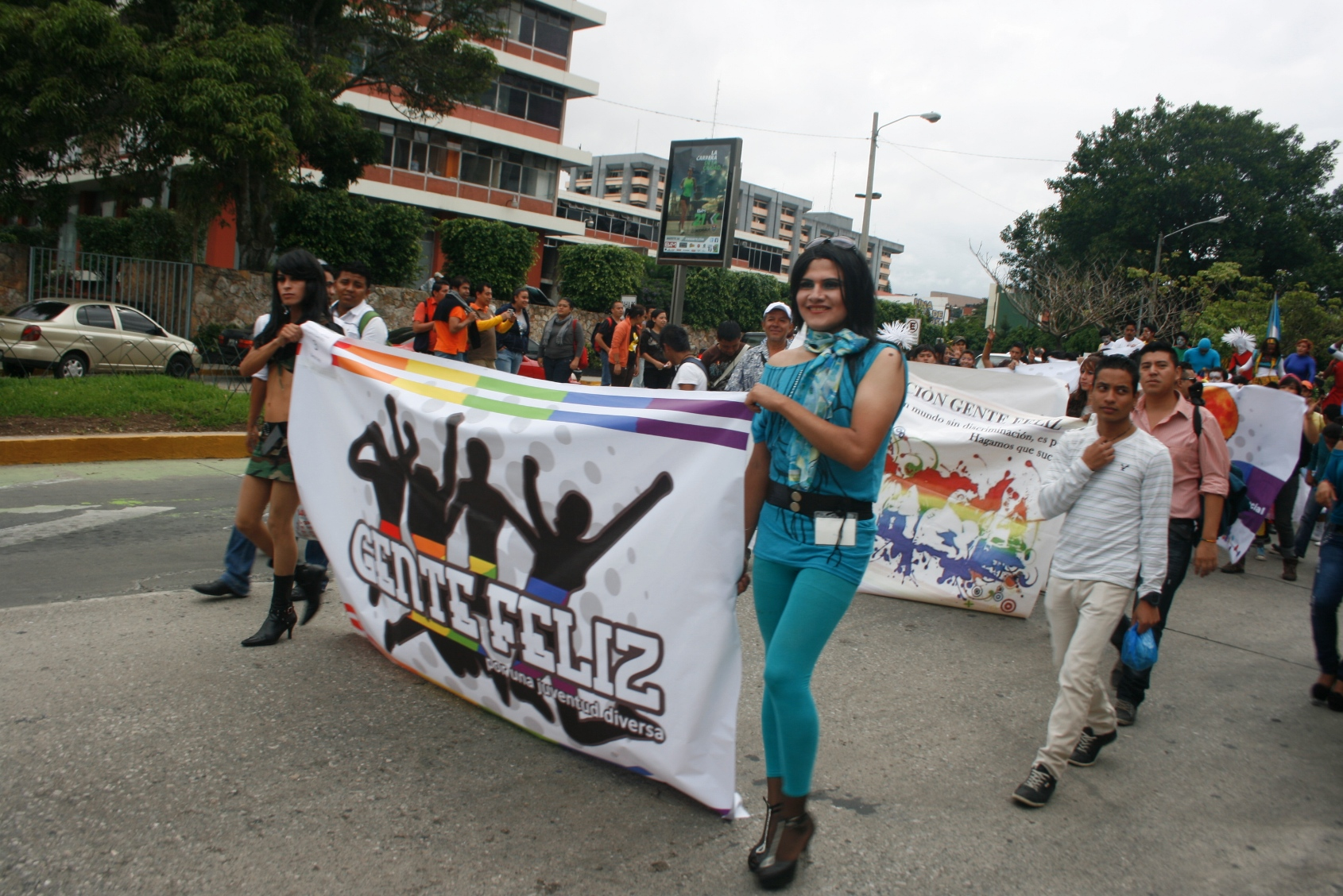
Participants of the Sexual Diversity Parade in 2012.

The origin of the parade dates back to the murder of María Conchita Alonso, a transgender woman who was fatally shot on October 2, 1997, in Zone 1 of Guatemala City. The crime was never fully clarified. On October 11 of the same year, after the funeral mass for Conchita, 24 of her friends left the church and began a march to commemorate her memory. They walked to Central Park, where they read a statement and a poem.

On June 25, 2000, around 200 LGBT activists held the country’s first “Gay Pride March.” The route began at the La Bodeguita del Centro establishment, proceeded toward the National Palace of Culture, and ended at the Pandora’s Box nightclub, where a plaque was placed to honor the memory of Conchita. The following year, no march took place.

The 2004 edition was notable for featuring, for the first time, the participation of an organization exclusively for transgender women: Otrans-Reinas de la Noche. The 2006 march, on the other hand, took on a tone of mourning due to a wave of murders targeting LGBT individuals, including activists from some of the country’s LGBT organizations. As a result, most participants dressed in black.

In 2007, the organizers decided to change the name of the event and began using the word “parade” to identify it, due to the military connotations associated with the word “march.”

Due to disagreements among the organizers, there were two parades in 2012, one held on June 23 and the other on June 30.

Over the years, the parade has steadily grown in attendance. By 2014, it was estimated that around 500 people took part, while by 2018 the number had grown to several thousand.

The parade was canceled in 2020 and 2021 due to the COVID-19 pandemic. In 2022, it returned and brought together more than ten thousand people, who followed a route from Plaza de la República to Plaza de las Niñas. That year’s edition featured the participation of delegations from various embassies and international cooperation organizations.

== See also ==
Sexual diversity in Guatemala
