= 2016 in Guatemala =

- Decades: 1990s; 2000s; 2010s; 2020s
- See also: Other events of 2016; Timeline of Guatemalan history

The following lists events that happened during 2016 in Guatemala.

== Incumbents ==
- Acting President: Alejandro Maldonado, 3 September 2015-current
- President-elect: Jimmy Morales, will take office on 14 January
- Vice President: Juan Alfonso Fuentes Soria (until 14 January), Jafeth Cabrera (from 14 January)

== Events ==
- Police arrested Manuel Benedicto Lucas Garcia, brother of former President Fernando Romeo Lucas García, and 13 others on 7 January on suspicion of involvement in the murders of 558 people during the Guatemalan Civil War.
- Soldiers shoot a 13-year-old boy named Julio Rene Alvarado Ruano and his younger border on the Belieze-Guatemala border starting border tensions.

== See also ==
- Timeline of Guatemalan history
