= Elmar Rojas =

Guatemalan Painter and Minister

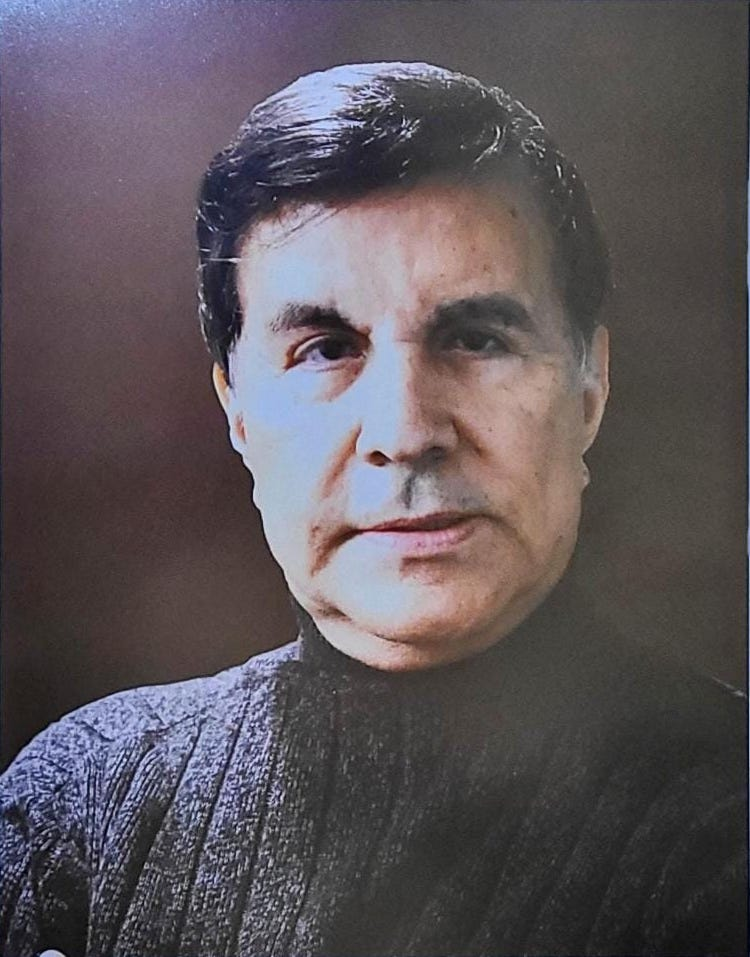

Minister of Culture and Sports
- In office 10 January 1986 – 14 January 1991
- President: Vinicio Cerezo
- Preceded by: Office established
- Succeeded by: Roberto Tomás Ogarrio

Personal details
- Born: December 1, 1936 Sacatepéquez, Guatemala
- Died: February 18, 2018 (aged 81)
- Occupation: Painter; architect

Elmar René Rojas Azurdia (1936 in San Raymundo Peñafort, Guatemala – 18 February 2018), was a Guatemalan painter who served as the first Minister of Culture and Sports under the government of Vinicio Cerezo. Rojas practiced as an architect before studying art in Guatemala, Spain, France, and Italy. He funded Guatemala's Ministry of Culture and was the subject of many exhibitions in cities around the world. His art is seen as expressive of "magical realism" or "wonderful reality." His international awards include the Gran Premio Iberoamericano "Cristobal Colón," presented in Madrid, Spain in 1989. Rojas, one of Latin America's most important artists, was also renowned as a great communicator of culture.

Rojas died on 18 February 2018 at the age of 76.

== Awards ==
MAAA Award (Mid-America Arts Alliance): One of the 15 best world artists in 1991.

Camilo Mori Award: IX Bienal de Arte, Valparaíso in 1989.

"Cristobal Colon" Iberoamerican Award: Madrid, Spain in 1989.

Bienal Mesoamericana. Museo de Arte Contemporáneo, Panamá in 1983.

Latinamerican Award of 'Casa de la Cultura Ecuatoriana', Quito, Ecuador in 1970

== Wonderful Real in Rojas' Art ==
The "wonderful real" is a “boundary state” in which the “inadvertent riches of reality,” or more simply, the day-to-day miracles, can become evident. The "wonderful real" displays the astonishment that surrounds the viewers of Rojas' art without their being able to see it, revealing revelations and facts that would seem more a part of dreams than of reality, although they belong to reality.

The "wonderful real" is connected to André Breton's definition of Surrealism: “It is a state of the spirit, in which the true and the false, the tall and the short, the dictory and contradictory stop being perceived as opposing each other. It is in vain to search in surrealist activity for a motive other that the hope of being able to determine this point.”

Miguel Ángel Asturias wrote in a foreword of a book on the classic Mayan city of Tikal: “Guatemala is only equal to itself. Mysterious presences and absences. That which is kept by the enigma. There is no need to read hieroglyphs. Stars are read."

Elmar Rojas' creative work also comes from this reality of prodigies and sufferings, from that intact vessel of the wonderful real which is Guatemala, the tormented and hallucinating land from which Rojas came. The strangeness of its contents is due to the fact that it is incarnated in this prodigious realm.

Elmar Rojas represents, in Latin American painting of this century, what Miguel Ángel Asturias, Alejo Carpentier or Gabriel García Márquez represented in American novels: builders of magical realism in literature.

Elmar Rojas' work inquires in the inexhaustible reservoir of the Guatemalan mestizo, drinking from the primeval sources of his culture. It shows and provokes the awe felt when getting amorously and devotedly closer to reality, closer to culture.

However, his work does not follow the immediate path of folklore, or any other non-depurated mechanism, but that of a painstaking artistic reconstruction of reality's composite order, which Rojas turns decipherable, trapped in its immanence so it will captivate and hallucinate from the bottom of his productions.
