= 2019 in Guatemala =

- Decades: 1990s; 2000s; 2010s; 2020s
- See also: Other events of 2019; Timeline of Guatemalan history

The following lists events in the year 2019 in Guatemala.

== Incumbents ==
- President: Jimmy Morales
- Vice-President: Jafeth Cabrera

== Events ==
- 28 March – At least 18 killed when a truck crashes into a crowd along the Pan-American Highway in Nahualá, Solola
- 16 June – Scheduled date for the 2019 Guatemalan general election
- 11 August – Alejandro Giammattei wins the second round of the presidential elections with 58% of the vote, defeating Sandra Torres, wife of the current president.

== Deaths ==
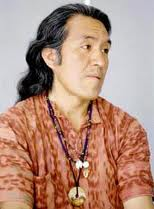
Humberto Ak'ab'al

- 10 January – Juan Francisco Reyes, politician, Vice President (b. 1938).
- 28 January – Humberto Ak'ab'al, poet (b. 1952).
- 13 April – Rodolfo Francisco Bobadilla Mata, Roman Catholic prelate, Bishop of Huehuetenango (b. 1932).
- 14 May – Wilmer Josue Ramirez Vasquez, 2, Guatemalan refugee who died while in the custody of U.S. Immigration and Customs Enforcement in El Paso, Texas; multiple intestinal and respiratory infectious diseases
- 25 September – Michael Coe, 90, American archaeologist and anthropologist who worked in Guatemala and Mexico (b. 1929)
- 1 November – Rina Lazo, 93, muralist (Fertile Earth), painter, and activist in Guatemala (Order of the Quetzal, 2004) and Mexico (b. Guatemala City, 1923)

== See also ==
- 2019 Pan American Games

== Links ==
- Media related to 2019 in Guatemala at Wikimedia Commons
