= Román Castellanos =

Guatemalan politician

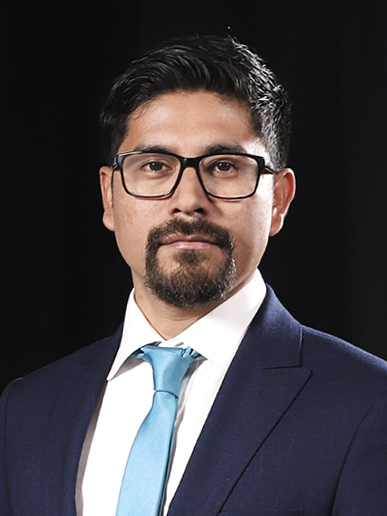
- Official portrait, 2020

Member of the Congress of Guatemala
- Incumbent
- Assumed office 14 January 2020
- Constituency: Guatemala City

Personal details
- Born: 8 April 1985 (age 41) Cobán, Alta Verapaz
- Party: Roots
- Other political affiliations: Semilla
- Education: Universidad de San Carlos de Guatemala

Román Wilfredo Castellanos Caal (born 8 April 1985) is a Guatemalan politician and political scientist. A founding member of Semilla party, he has been a member of Congress since January 2020. Castellanos is a Qʼeqchiʼ Mayan.
