= Ricardo Falla-Sánchez =

Guatemalan anthropologist

- Born: 1932 (age 93–94)
- Occupations: Priest, Anthropologist

Ricardo Falla-Sánchez (born 1932) is a Guatemalan Jesuit and anthropologist. He studied in the United States and has dedicated his life to documenting the lives and cultures of the Quiché [K'iche'] Maya Indians in Guatemala and other indigenous peoples in Central America. His writings document the massacres of indigenous communities, their struggles for justice and human rights, and their revitalization with assistance by Catholic Action, an outside organization.

== Books ==
- La conversión religiosa: estudio sobre un movimiento rebelde a las creencias tradicionales en San Antonio Ilotenango, Quiché, Guatemala (1948-1970), University of Texas at Austin, 1975
- Quiché Rebelde: estudio de un movimiento de conversión religiosa, rebelde a las creencias tradicionales, en San Antonio Ilotenango, Quiché (1948-1970), 1978; Quiché Rebelde: Religious Conversion, Politics, and Ethnic Identity in Guatemala, 2003
- Masacres de la selva: Ixcán, Guatemala, 1975–1982, 1993; Massacres in the Jungle: Ixcan, Guatemala, 1975–1982, 1994
- Historia de un gran amor: recuperación autobiografica de la experiencia con las Comunidades de Población en Resistencia, Ixcán, Guatemala, 1993

== Archival Collections ==
The Falla-Sánchez papers now reside at the Marquette University, a Jesuit university, in Milwaukee, Wisconsin. The collection includes reformatted versions of Falla's papers and documentation regarding the indigenous Cuna, Quiché [K'iche'], and Yaruro of Panama, Guatemala, and Venezuela, respectively. The microfilm includes textual materials, maps, and charts such as various field notes and related materials on the life, culture, and victimization of indigenous people. The collection also includes photographic copy prints and negatives and interview recordings in separate series.

== See also ==
- Marquette University Special Collections and University Archives
