= Milton Francisco Guerra Calderón =

Guatemalan politician (1974–2023)

Member of the Congress of Guatemala
- In office 14 January 2016 – 14 January 2020

Personal details
- Born: 29 October 1974; Izabal, Guatemala
- Died: 26 August 2023 (aged 48); Jutiapa, Guatemala
- Political party: National Change Union; National Convergence Front

Milton Francisco Guerra Calderón (29 October 1974 – 26 August 2023) was a Guatemalan businessman, rancher and politician who served as a member of the Congress of Guatemala from 2016 to 2020. Guerra was a member of the political parties National Change Union (UCN) and National Convergence Front (FCN) and represented the latter in congress. Guerra was assassinated on 26 August 2023.

== Life and career ==
Guerra was born on 29 October 1974.

In the 2015 Congressional elections, Guerra ran for the FCN, in which his party received the fifth-highest vote share (9%) and Guerra himself was one of 11 FCN members elected.

On 26 August 2023, Guerra was shot to death in Jutiapa. He was 48.
