= 2025 in Guatemala =

- Decades: 2000s; 2010s; 2020s
- See also: Other events of 2025; Timeline of Guatemalan history

The following lists events in the year 2025 in Guatemala.

== Incumbents ==
- President: Bernardo Arévalo
- Vice-President: Karin Herrera

== Events ==
=== February ===
- 5 February – President Bernardo Arévalo announces an agreement allowing for Guatemala to host migrants deported from the United States.
- 10 February – 2025 Guatemala City bus crash. A bus falls off of a bridge over the Las Vacas River in Guatemala City, Guatemala, killing at least 55 people, and seriously injuring 9 others.
- 11 February – Former congressman Jose Armando Ubico Aguilar is sentenced to 18 years' imprisonment by a US court for involvement in trafficking cocaine to the United States.

=== March ===
- 10 March –
  - The Volcán de Fuego erupts, forcing the evacuation of nearly 300 families.
  - Journalist José Rubén Zamora is returned to prison after his appeals against the reversal of his house arrest are denied.

=== April ===
- 23 April – Deputy energy and mines minister Luis Pacheco is arrested on charges of terrorism related to his role in protests by indigenous peoples in 2023.

=== May ===
- 30 May – Three former paramilitaries are convicted of crimes against humanity for rape and other abuses committed against 36 Achi women in Rabinal from 1981 to 1985 during the Guatemalan Civil War and sentenced to 40 years' imprisonment.

=== June ===
- 2 June – An appeals court acting on a request by the office of the Attorney General of Guatemala orders the arrest of Colombian attorney-general Luz Adriana Camargo and defense minister Iván Velásquez Gómez over their role in the International Commission against Impunity in Guatemala.
- 5 June – The Volcán de Fuego erupts, forcing the evacuation of 594 people.
- 8 June – Mexican police enter the Guatemalan border town of La Mesilla during an operation that leaves four gunmen dead.
- 29 June - Guatemala made it to the 2025 CONCACAF Gold Cup Semifinal for the first time in 29 years since the 96 Edition

=== July ===
- 8 July – A magnitude 5.7 earthquake hits Escuintla Department, killing 10 people.
- 11 July – Five people accused of robbing victims of the 8 July earthquake are fatally lynched by residents in Santa María de Jesús.
- 29 July – A magnitude 5.6 earthquake hits Jutiapa Department, killing one person.

=== August ===
- 12 August –
  - Six former government officials, including Social Welfare Secretary Carlos Rodas, are convicted and sentenced to up to 25 years on charges of manslaughter and abuse of authority over the 2017 Guatemala orphanage fire.
  - The Barrio 18 and Mara Salvatrucha gangs stage riots in two prisons in Guatemala City, injuring two people and leaving 11 guards hostage before being rescued by police later in the day.
- 14 August – A prison guard is killed in a riot believed to have been staged by Mara Salvatrucha at a jail in Cuilapa.
- 15 August – Mexico, Guatemala and Belize announce an agreement to create a tri-national nature reserve to protect the Maya Forest.
- 20 August – The government grants asylum to 161 Mexican nationals who fled organized crime from Frontera Comalapa in Chiapas.

=== October ===
- 15 October – Interior Minister Francisco Jiménez resigns along with two of his deputies over the escape of 20 members of the Barrio 18 gang from prison.

=== December ===
- 6 December – Nelson Luciano Marroquín, the mayor of Masagua, is shot dead by unidentified gunmen while attending a Christmas parade.
- 14 December – A 15-day state of emergency is declared in Nahuala and Santa Catarina Ixtahuacan in Solola Department following a series of attacks that leave five people dead.
- 27 December – A bus falls into a ravine along the Inter-American Highway in Cumbre de Alaska, Totonicapan Department, killing 15 people and injuring 19 others.

== Holidays ==
- 1 January – New Year's Day
- 17–19 April – Holy Week
- 1 May – Labour Day
- 1 July – Army Day
- 15 September – Independence Day
- 20 October – Guatemalan Revolution
- 1 November – All Saints' Day
- 25 December – Christmas Day

== Deaths ==
- 8 December – Rosa Leal de Pérez, 71, psychologist, first lady (2012–2015)
