= Law enforcement in Guatemala =

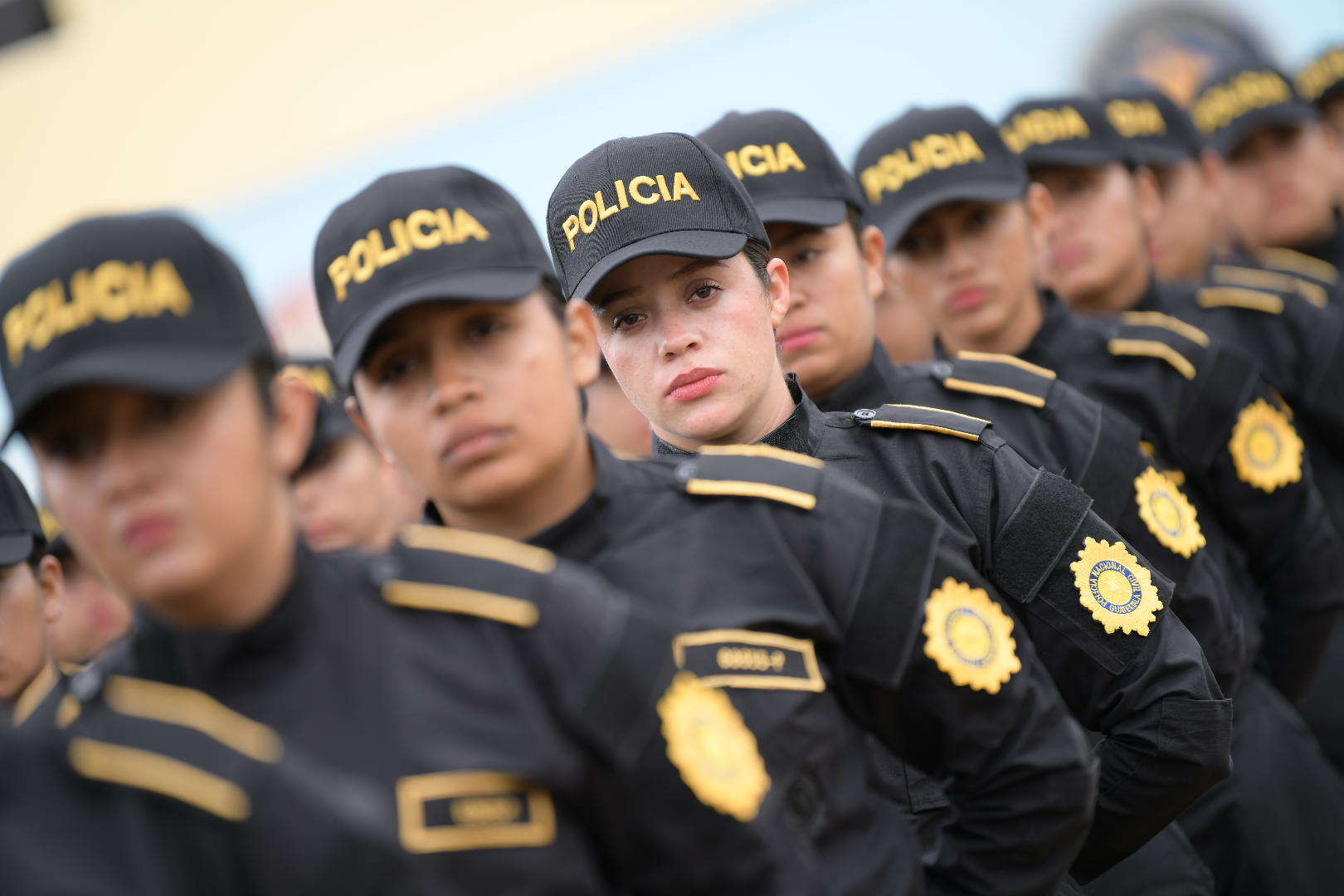
Elements of the National Civil Police.

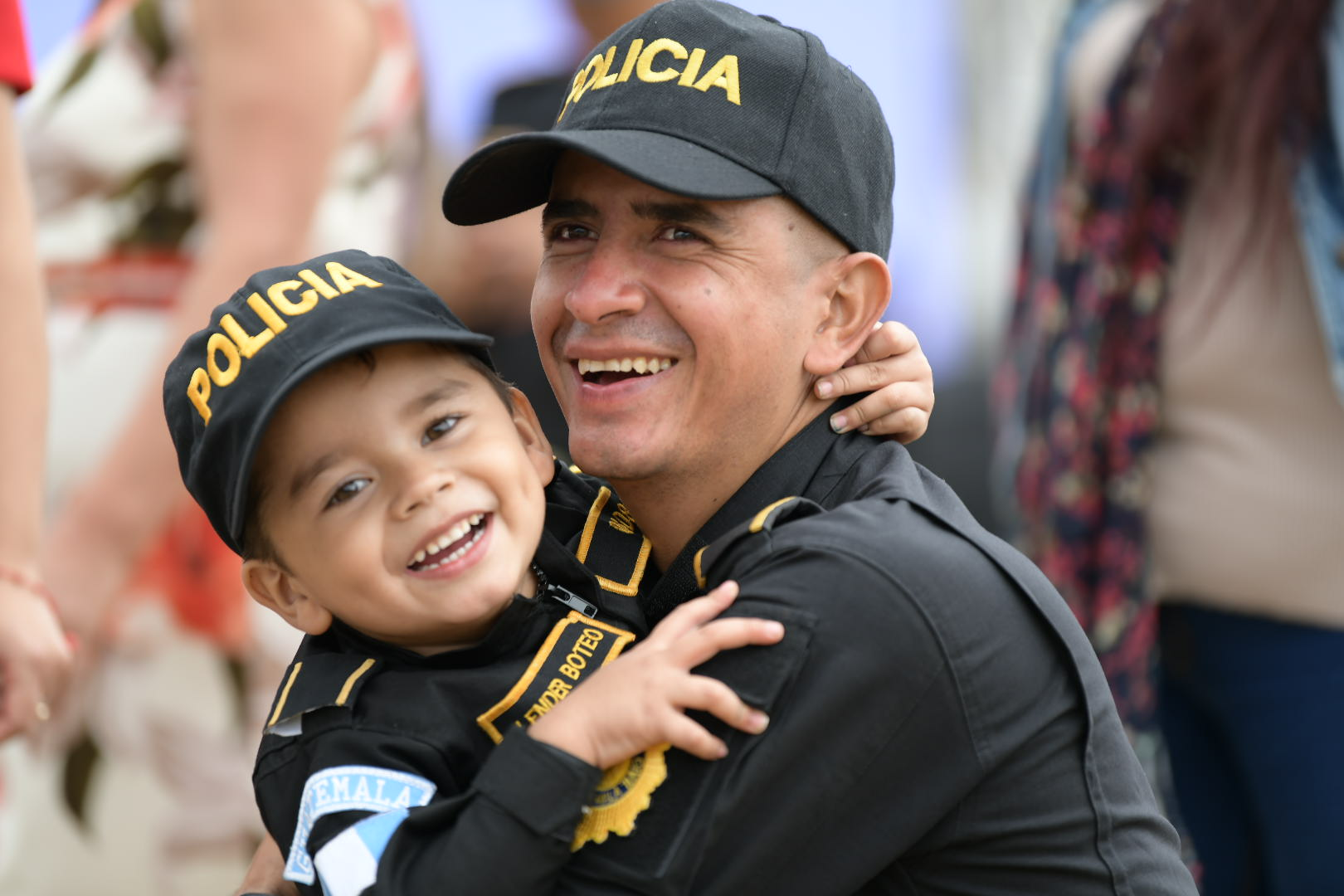
Recently graduated cadet with his son.

Law enforcement in Guatemala, mainly performed by the civilian-led National Civil Police (PNC), yet assisted by its military, which has a poor record with regard to human rights violations. During President general Otto Pérez Molina, elected in 2012, stepped up the use of military reinforcement in the country's law enforcement, which was introduced in 2005 as a 'temporary measure' yet lasted several electoral periods. During the country's civil war from 1960 to 1996, 200,000 people were killed and 45,000 forcibly disappeared.

According to the Historical Clarification Commission, Guatemala's truth and reconciliation commission, the Guatemalan state (military and government paramilitaries) was responsible for over 90 percent of human rights abuses recorded there. More recently, in October 2012, six people were killed and another 34 injured when soldiers opened fire into a crowd of indigenous protesters. The military has also been tied to drug trafficking and organized crime.

After the internal conflict, as part of the peace agreements, the National Civil Police (PNC) was established as national civilian police with a nationwide jurisdiction and a department based division.

== Military deployment ==
Since 2012, the government has opened at least five new military bases, with over 21,000 troops deployed throughout nine states. These "Citizen Security Squadrons" range from Huehuetenango to Quiche and Alta Verapaz, from Escuintla to Suchitepequez and Santa Rosa, and from Zacapa to Izabal and Chiquimula, and are also stationed in Guatemala City. A new military unit, known as Joint Task Force Tecún Umán (Fuerza de Tarea Tecún Umán), began operating in zones along the border shared with Mexico.

== Historical secret police organizations ==
- Policía Judicial (Judicial Police)
- Policía Militar Ambulate (PMA) (Mobile Military Police)
- Guardia de Hacienda (Palace Guard)
- Ejército Secreto Anti-Comunista (ESAC) (Secret Anti-Communist Army)
- Centro de Servicios Especiales de la Presidencia (Centre for Special Presidential Services)

== Sources ==
- World Police Encyclopedia Wo, ed. by Dilip K. Das & Michael Palmiotto. by Taylor & Francis. 2004.
- WoWorld Encyclopedia of Police Forces and Correctional SystemsWo, 2nd edition. Gale, 2006.
- Sullivan, Larry E. et al. WoEncyclopedia of Law EnforcementWo. Thousand Oaks: Sage Publications, 2005.
