= 2022 Huehuetenango attack =

Guatemalan assassination attempt

- Location: Huehuetenango Department, Guatemala
- Date: 30 July 2022
- Target: Alejandro Giammattei
- Attack type: assassination attempt
- Deaths: 0
- Injuries: 1 (a perpetrator)

The 2022 Huehuetenango attack was an alleged assassination attempt against the president of Guatemala, Alejandro Giammattei, during a visit to a village of the Huehuetenango Department, less than half a kilometer from the border with Mexico on July 30, 2022.

On Saturday, July 30, 2022, a group of armed civilians opened fire at a checkpoint of the Guatemalan Army to protect the visit of the president of the village La Laguna —which is located two kilometers from the point— belonging to the municipality Jacaltenango, in the department of Huehuetenango. The balance of this armed confrontation resulted in an injured attacker of Mexican nationality and, shortly thereafter, the arrest of four other alleged attackers of Guatemalan nationality who had fled into Mexico. The president was unharmed.

The official version of events has been questioned by some local media, who consider it a "smokescreen" to cover up the highly controversial arrest of the president of one of the country's leading newspapers.
