= 1981 in Guatemala =

- Decades: 1960s; 1970s; 1980s; 1990s; 2000s
- See also: Other events of 1981; Timeline of Guatemalan history

The following lists events that happened during 1981 in the Republic of Guatemala.

== Incumbents ==
- President: Fernando Romeo Lucas García
- Vice President: Óscar Mendoza Azurdia

== Events ==
=== April ===
- April 21 - Soldiers of the Army of Guatemala entered the village of Acul, near Santa Maria Nebaj in the Guatemalan highlands, and executed most of the adult men for suspected collaboration with leftist guerillas. "Within two weeks," an investigator for the government noted in 1997, "the village was empty, and the army burned every house and field of corn in Acul". The village was rebuilt two years later.
