= Karin Herrera =

Vice President of Guatemala since 2024

Her Excellency Karin Herrera
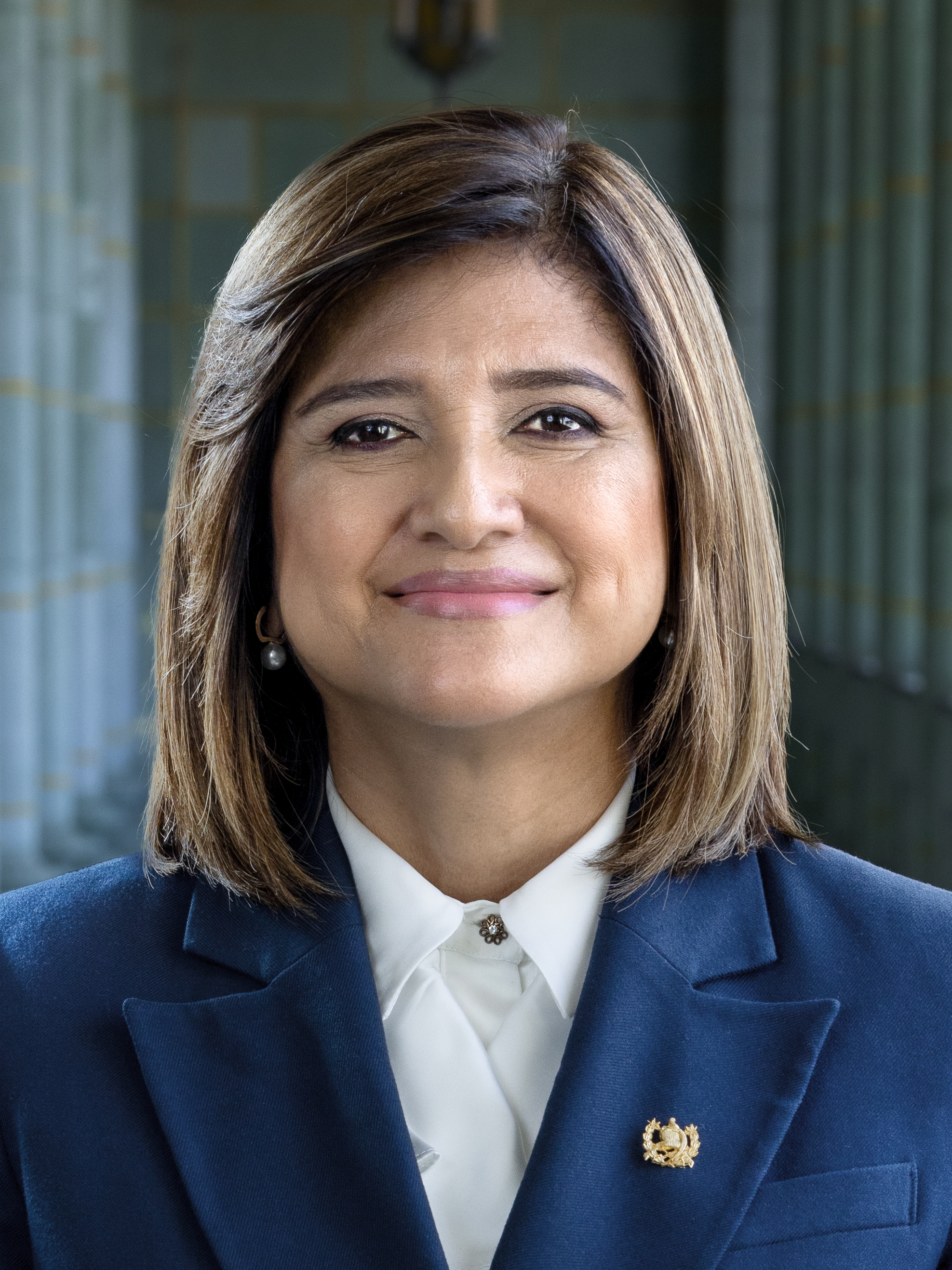
- Official portrait, 2024

18th Vice President of Guatemala
- Incumbent
- Assumed office 15 January 2024
- President: Bernardo Arévalo
- Preceded by: Guillermo Castillo

Personal details
- Born: 25 July 1967 (age 59) Guatemala City, Guatemala
- Party: Semilla
- Spouse: Gustavo Gómez Álvarez (m. 2001; div. 2021)
- Children: 2
- Education: University of the Valley (MA); Pontifical University of Salamanca (PhD)
- Occupation: Biologist; professor; sociologist; author; politician

Karin Larissa Herrera Aguilar (born 25 July 1967) is a Guatemalan biologist, professor, sociologist, and politician who has served as the 18th vice president of Guatemala since 2024. A member of the political party Semilla, she was elected vice president alongside President Bernardo Arévalo, having won the second round of the 2023 presidential election.

== Early life and career ==
Herrera was born on 25 July 1967 in Guatemala City into a conservative middle-class family. She is the only daughter of Adalberto Herrera and Gladis Aguilar. Her father was a lawyer from Huehuetenango who served in 1976 as the titular judge of the Departmental Court of First Instance of Petén, while her mother is a housewife from Jutiapa. Herrera has remarked that her mother was conservative and anti-communist but would later change her ideological positions after reading the book Massacres of the Jungle by Ricardo Falla-Sánchez.

During her childhood, her parents tried to protect her from the hostile environment caused by the internal armed conflict in the country. Both Herrera and her mother would witness the kidnapping of a neighbor, a young student from the University of San Carlos. The incident would leave a negative mark on Herrera's life, leading her to keep a low profile.

=== Education ===
Herrera graduated from the Faculty of Chemical Sciences of the University of San Carlos with a degree in Biological chemistry. She has a master's degree in environmental studies from the University of the Valley and a doctorate in political science and sociology from the Pontifical University of Salamanca in Spain. She has received several international awards for her work in favor of the environment.

==== Lecturer and advisor ====
After graduation, Herrera began to work as a professor at the University of San Carlos and also as the university's director for the Chemical and Biological Research program. As a professor, she has taught courses on topics such as Microbiological Analysis and Control of Industrial Processes and, Microbiological Control of Food, Medicines and Cosmetics. She would also become an advisor to various organizations such as the Amatitlán Lake Authority (AMSA), Doctors Without Borders, and the National Network for Environmental Training and Research (REDFIA).

Herrera has collaborated with the Guatemalan Standards Commission (COGUANOR) and the Guatemalan Accreditation Office (OGA) and was a representative for the Technical Committee of Testing and Calibration Laboratories of the OGA. She has also participated as an advisor to several theses, seminars, and research projects.

==== USAC board member ====
During the 2015 demonstrations, Herrera decided to participate with the USAC's policy board where she would be elected as a representative of the College of Pharmacists and Chemists of Guatemala. She would hold that position from 2015 to 2017.

In 2021, she was elected as the vice president of the Board of Directors of the College of Pharmacists and Chemists of Guatemala for the 2021–2023 period.

== Political career ==
Herrera sympathized with the positions held by the Movimiento Semilla party. At the end of 2022, Deputy Román Castellanos invited her to participate in the internal process of electing the candidate for the vice presidency of Semilla. She was selected and elected by the party and was officially proclaimed in January 2023 as a candidate for the vice presidency and running mate of presidential candidate Bernardo Arévalo to participate in the 2023 general elections.

However, January 14, 2024, her planned inauguration would be delayed. She would instead be sworn in minutes after midnight on January 15, 2024, after protests demanding the government transfer power.

== Political position ==
Herrera has stated that her political ideology is based on Christian humanism.

== Personal life ==
In 2001, she married biologist Gustavo Gómez Álvarez. The couple divorced in 2021. They have two children.

Apart from Spanish, Herrera is fluent in English.

Party political offices
Preceded by Jonathan Menkos	Semilla Movement nominee for Vice President of Guatemala; 2023	Dissolved party
Political offices
Preceded by Guillermo Castillo Reyes	Vice President of Guatemala; 2024–present	Incumbent
