= COVID-19 pandemic in Guatemala =

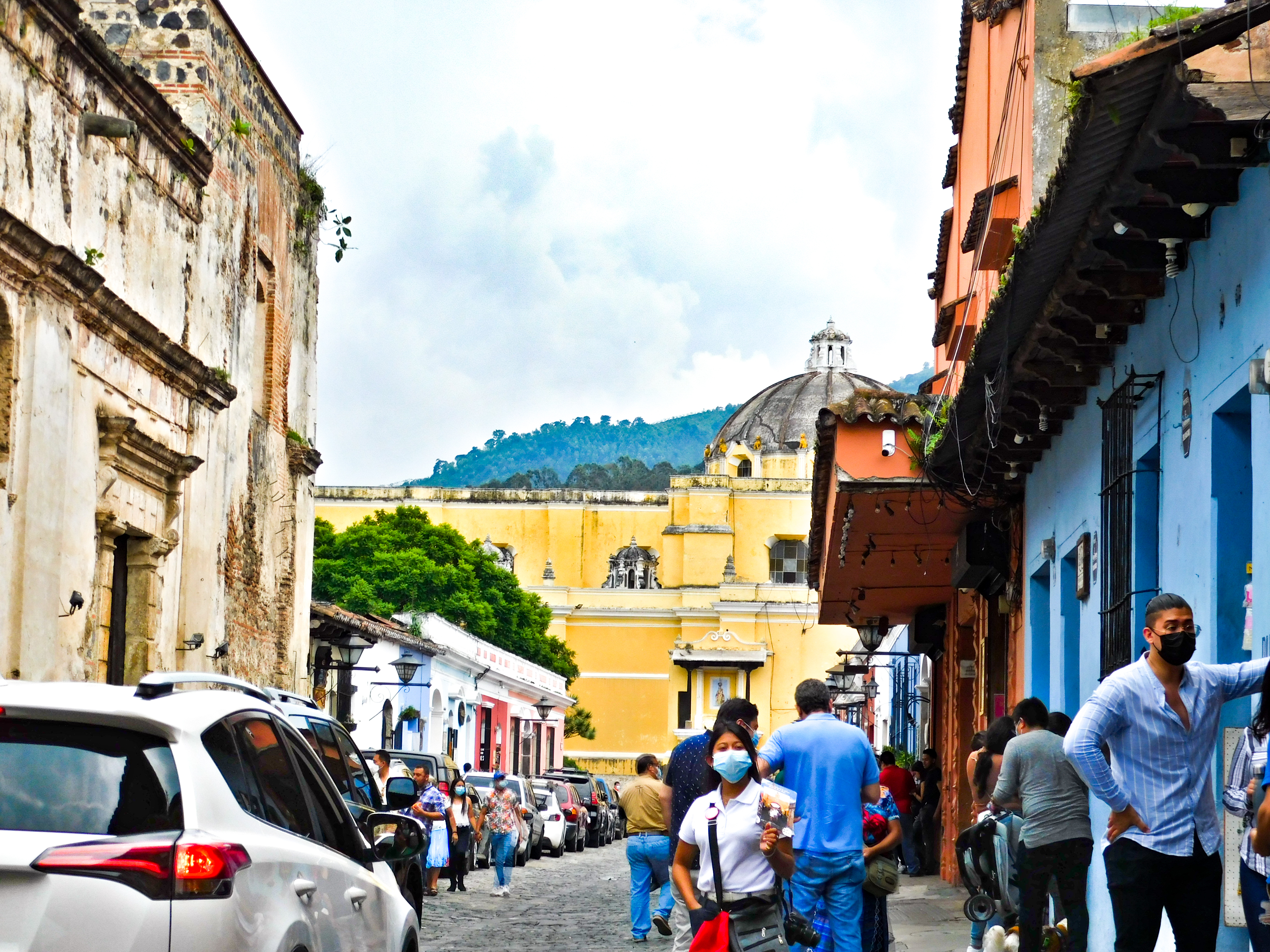
- People wearing masks in Antigua
- Disease: COVID-19
- Pathogen: SARS-CoV-2
- Location: Guatemala
- First outbreak: Wuhan, Hubei, China
- Index case: Guatemala City
- Arrival date: 13 March 2020 (6 years, 7 months and 2 weeks)
- Confirmed cases: 142,064
- Active cases: 9,491
- Suspected cases: 61,600
- Recovered: 129,990
- Deaths: 16,097
- Fatality rate: 3.8%

Government website
- www.mspas.gob.gt

The COVID-19 pandemic in Guatemala is a part of the worldwide pandemic of coronavirus disease 2019 (COVID-19) caused by severe acute respiratory syndrome coronavirus 2 (SARS-CoV-2). The virus was confirmed to have reached Guatemala in March 2020.

== Background ==
On 12 January 2020, the World Health Organization (WHO) confirmed that a novel coronavirus was the cause of a respiratory illness in a cluster of people in Wuhan, Hubei, China, which was reported to the WHO on 31 December 2019. The case fatality ratio for C OVID-19 has been much lower than SARS of 2003, but the transmission has been significantly greater, with a significant total death toll.

On January 31, president of Guatemala Alejandro Giammattei issued a prohibition for the arrival of visitors coming from the People's Republic of China due to the international concern for the outbreak that originated in Wuhan.

On February 25, the government implements safety procedures for travellers coming from high-risk countries who are entering Guatemala from any terrestrial, maritime or aerial transport. These countries include China, South Korea, Iran and every European country.

Throughout the pandemic, there have been corruption scandals related to a fraud ring inside the ministry and fraudulent test purchases. Hence, there have been protests throughout the country, mainly in Guatemala City, where citizens stood up for more protective equipment for frontline workers, against ongoing labour rights violations and pandemic-related corruption.

== Timeline ==
Cases

Deaths

On 13 March 2020, the first case in Guatemala, a Guatemalan man who traveled from Italy to Guatemala, was confirmed. The man arrived in Villa Nueva, a suburb of Guatemala City, along with two of his family members and five Salvadorans on an Aeroméxico flight.

Two days prior to the country's first case, the Guatemalan government banned entry to citizens of all European countries, Iran, China and South Korea, which was put into effect on 12 March.

On 13 March 2020, the Guatemalan government extended its travel restrictions to travelers from the US and Canada. Starting on 16 March, no travelers coming from these countries will be allowed to enter Guatemala, until March 31 (15 day quarantine is in place as of March 16).

On 15 March 2020, the Guatemalan government confirmed its second case and the first COVID-19 death in the country. an 85-year-old man who arrived from Madrid with his family nine days earlier. The same day, the Guatemalan government cancels all public events and prohibits agglomerations of more than 100 people. All public and private schools and universities are to be closed for at least three weeks. Holy Week celebrations are also cancelled.

On March 21, 2020, the Guatemalan President Alejandro Giammattei alongside its vice-president and the Council Of Ministry declared a nationwide curfew and a global travel ban, in an effort to tackle the COVID-19 pandemic and prevent the spreading of the virus.

On April 23, the United Nations Commission on Human Rights calls on Mexican and Central American governments to halt deportations during the COVID-19 pandemic. 2,500 migrants are stuck in Panama because Honduras has closed its border. Mexico has dumped migrants in Guatemala, but Guatemala has not let them in. On April 23 the organization helped 41 migrants return to El Salvador from Mexico.

On April 26, Mexico's National Institute of Migration (INM) empties the 65 migrant detention centers it has across the country by returning 3,653 people to Guatemala, El Salvador, and Honduras in the hope of preventing outbreaks of COVID-19.

At least forty Mexican and Guatemalan farm workers in Canada have coronavirus, according to the United Food and Commercial Workers (UFCW) union on May 2.

On May 25, at least two hundred textile workers at the ′′K.P. Textil′′ plant in San Miguel Petapa tested positive for COVID-19. Nine cases were reported at the plant on May 12, but human rights groups complain that no action was taken at the time. Guatemala reported more than 3,300 confirmed infections and 58 deaths.

On 18 September, Guatemalan President Alejandro Giammattei said that he tested positive for the coronavirus.

== Vaccination ==
Guatemala has developed a vaccination campaign in four phases: (1) health professionals, (2a) People over 70, (2b) people over 50, (3) essential workers, (4) people over 18. Each phase is categorized in more specific subgroups. Guatemala is among the countries with the slowest vaccine roll out in Central America. By the end of May 2021, Guatemala has administered 2.36 doses per 100 people. Similar to other countries in the region, Guatemala has received 403,000 vaccines doses through the COVAX mechanism, a global initiative that aims at equitable access to COVID-19 vaccines. Furthermore, Guatemala has received donations from Israel, India and Russia which makes a total of 658,200 doses out of which 90 percent consist of AstraZeneca's Covishield vaccine. However, by the end of May 2021 only 429,959 doses have been administered. The supply of Guatemala as of May 2021 covers 44.7% of the population. Like Honduras, Nicaragua and Paraguay, Guatemala is not a recipient of vaccine donations from China, as they have diplomatic ties with Taiwan instead of China and recognize Taipei over Beijing. As the vaccination roll out has been slow and the government failed to prepare cold storages, vaccine centres and personnel in time, some of vaccine doses may expire by June 2021.

== See also ==
- COVID-19 pandemic in North America
- COVID-19 pandemic by country
- 2020 in Guatemala
- 2020 in Central America
- List of epidemics
- History of smallpox in Mexico
- Cocoliztli epidemics
- 1889–1890 flu pandemic
- 1918-20 Spanish flu pandemic
- 1968 Hong Kong flu pandemic
- HIV/AIDS
- 2019–2020 dengue fever epidemic
- 2002–2004 SARS outbreak
- Mumps outbreaks in the 21st century
- 2013–2014 chikungunya outbreak
