= Jazmín de la Vega =

Guatemalan architect and politician (born 1956)

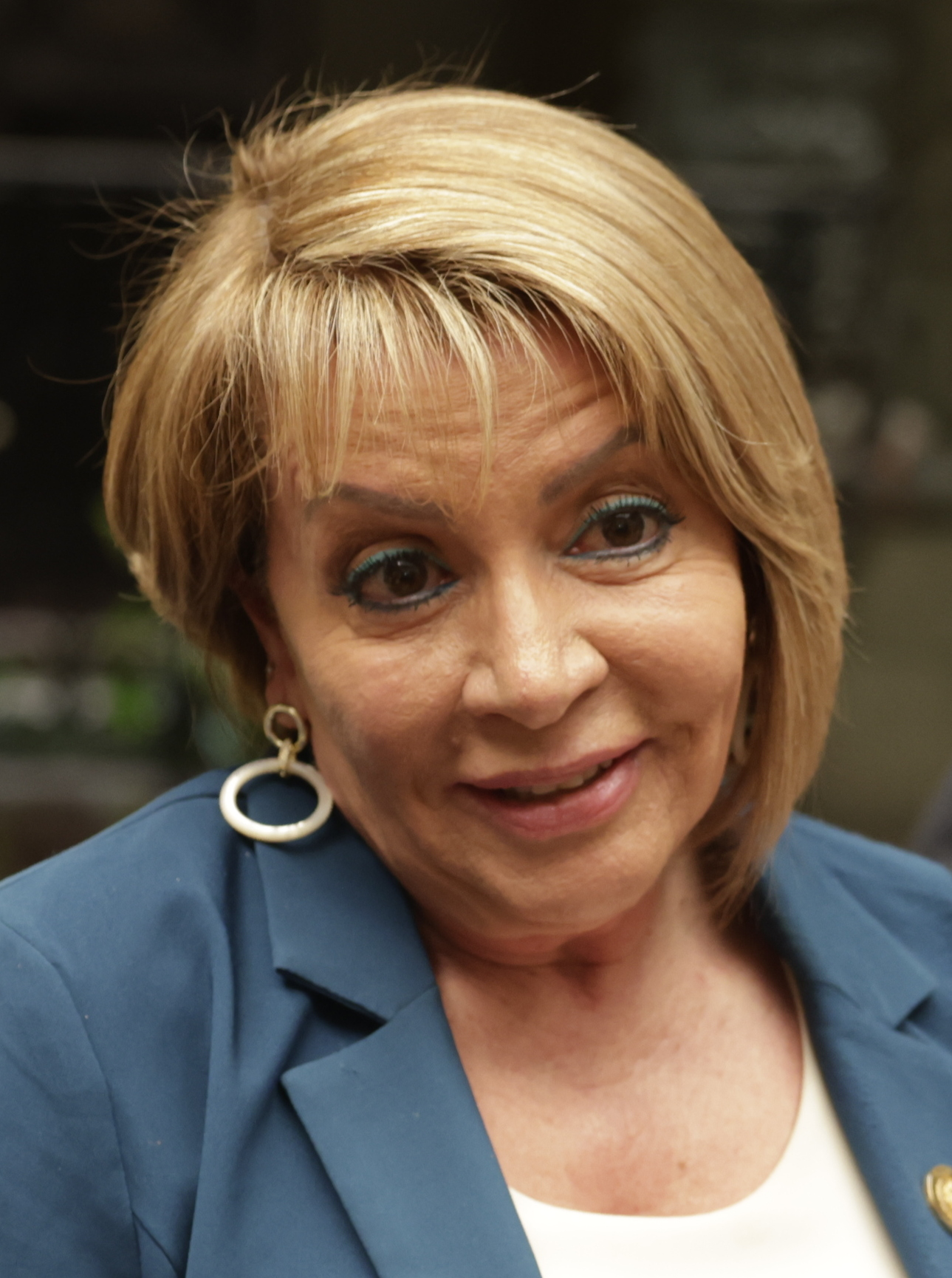

Minister of Communications, Infrastructure and Housing
- In office 15 January 2024 – 17 May 2024
- President: Bernardo Arévalo
- Preceded by: Javier Maldonado Quiñónez
- Succeeded by: Félix Alvarado

Personal details
- Born: 11 June 1956 (age 70) Guatemala City, Guatemala
- Party: National Advancement Party
- Education: Universidad de San Carlos de Guatemala

Diana Jazmín de la Vega (born 11 June 1956) is a Guatemalan architect and politician. She served as Minister of Communications, Infrastructure and Housing in the Government of Guatemala in 2024.

== Biography ==
Jazmín de la Vega was born on 11 June 1956 in Guatemala City. She has a bachelor's degree in architecture and postgraduate degrees in costs and budgets in construction and environmental law.

In the 1995–96 Guatemalan general election, de la Vega ran as a candidate for the National Advancement Party, but was not elected.

In January 2024, President of Guatemala Bernardo Arévalo appointed de la Vega as Ministry of Communications, Infrastructure and Housing in the Government of Guatemala (Spanish: Ministro de Comunicaciones, Infraestructura y Vivienda de Guatemala), succeeding Javier Maldonado Quiñónez.

With Bernardo Arévalo, the mayor of Guatemala City Ricardo Quiñónez, the United States ambassador to Guatemala Tobin Bradley and the Guatemala City councilor of Semilla Ninotchka Matute, de la Vega supervised the progress of the construction of the first phase of Metro Riel, a light-rail system that is one of the priorities of the Arévalo government.

De la Vega was fired from her ministerial position in May 2024. She was succeeded by Félix Alvarado.
