= 2027 Guatemala City mayoral election =

Local election in Guatemala

- June 2027
Incumbent Mayor
Ricardo Quiñónez
Unionist

The 2027 Guatemala City mayoral election will be held in June 2027, to elect the mayor of Guatemala City, Guatemala Department and thirteen members of the Municipal Council. Incumbent Ricardo Quiñónez Lemus is eligible for another term.

It is expected to be a highly competitive election, due to the decline in popularity of the Unionist Party and the current mayor Ricardo Quiñónez, and the rise of Roberto González and Samuel Pérez, prominent opposition figures to Unionism.

== Council composition ==
The table below shows the composition of the political groups in the Municipal Council at the present time.

Current Municipal Council composition
Parties
Parties	Seats
Unionist Party	4
Commitment, Renewal and Order	3
Movimiento Semilla ⇒ now Roots	1
Winaq	1
National Unity of Hope	1

== Potential candidates ==
- Jazmín de la Vega, former minister of Communications, Infrastructure and Housing; (Vision with Values)
- Ricardo Quiñónez Lemus, incumbent mayor; (Unionist)
- Roberto González Díaz-Durán, former minister of Energy and Mines; (CREO)
- Samuel Pérez Álvarez, incumbent member of Congress and former President of Congress; (Roots)
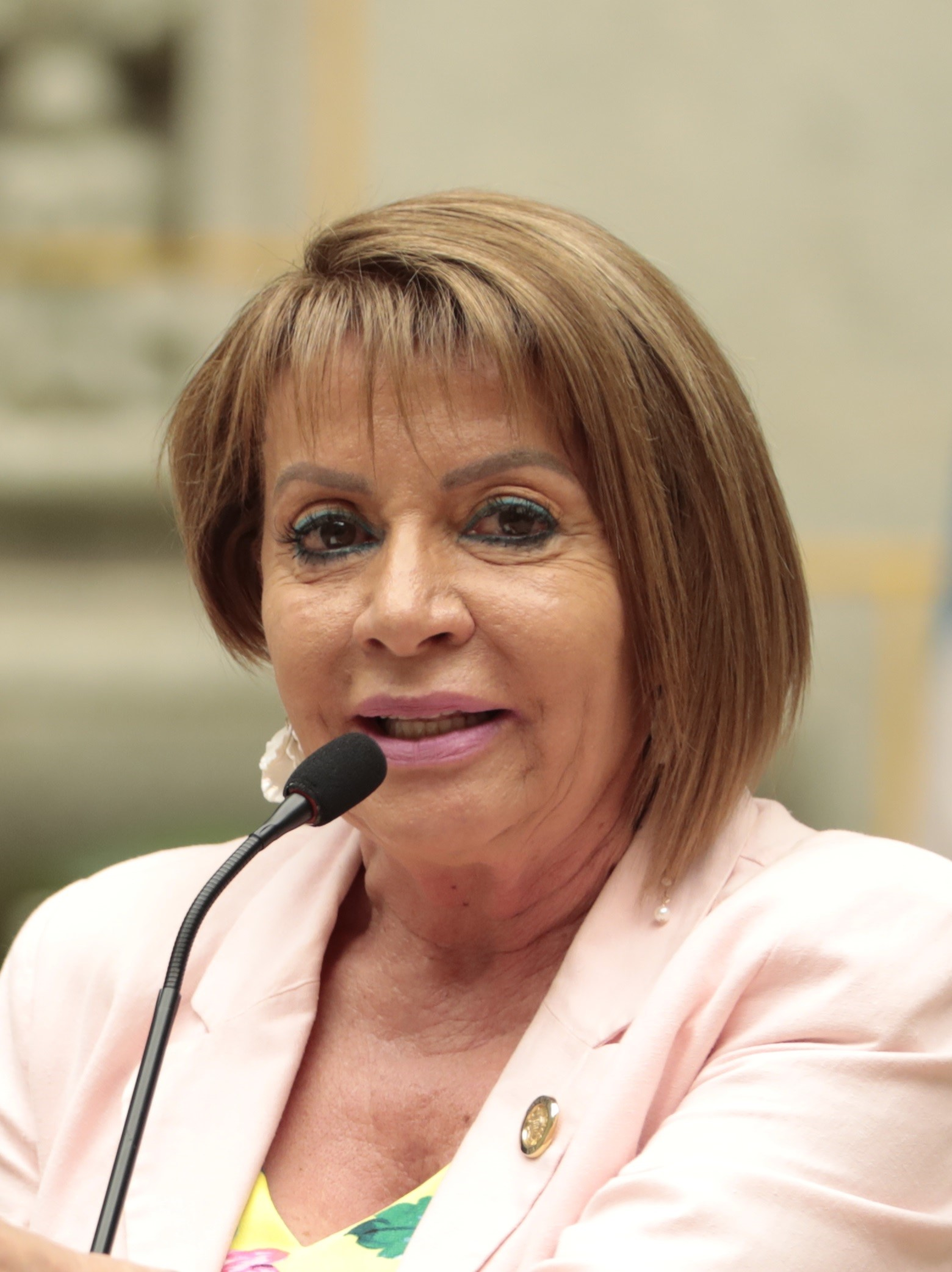
Former minister
Jazmín de la Vega
(VIVA)

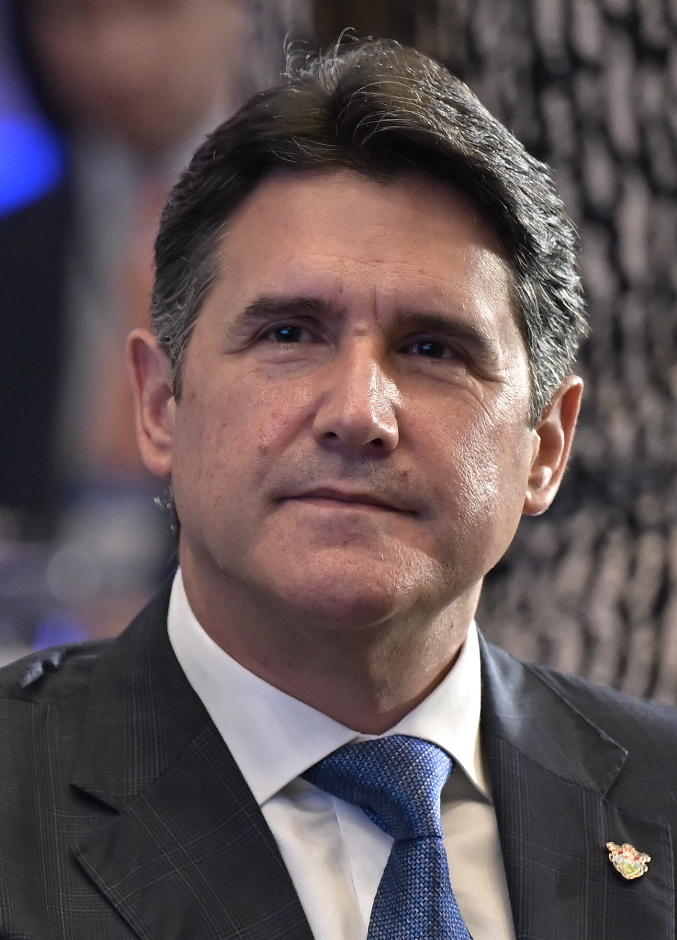
Incumbent mayor
Ricardo Quiñónez
(Unionist)

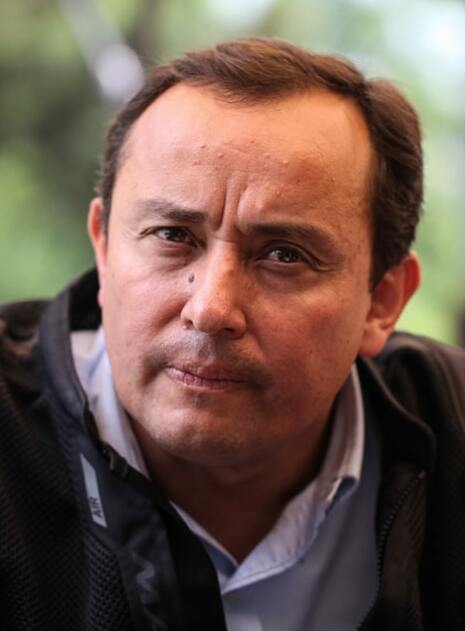
Former minister
Roberto González
(CREO)

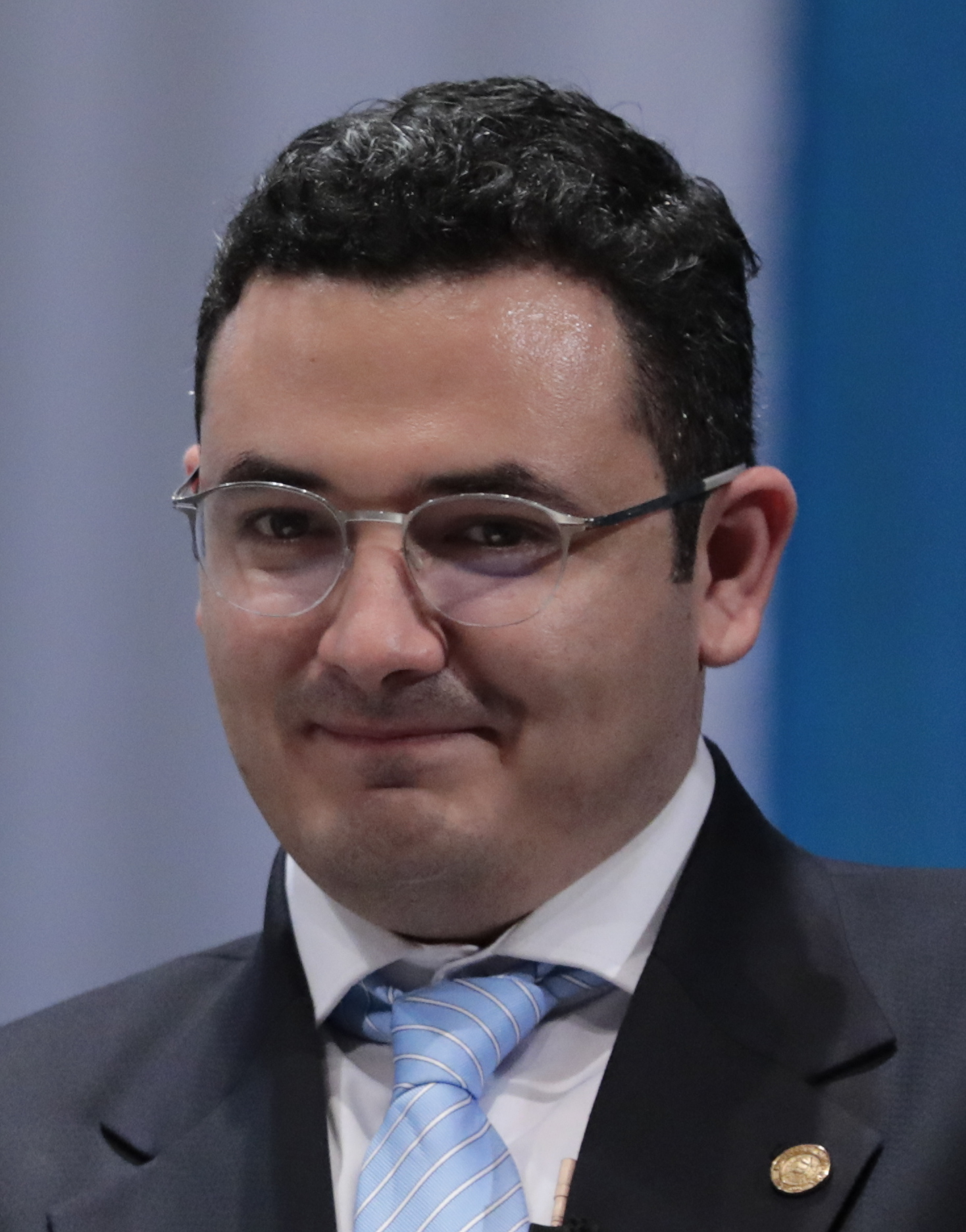
Former president of Congress
Samuel Pérez
(Roots)

== Opinion polls ==
=== Opinion polls before candidate registration ===
- Political parties that are crossed out are not active or have been cancelled; and political parties in italics refer to those that are in formation.

Polling firm	Fieldwork date	Sample size	Sebastián Arzú	Tono Coro	Jazmín de la Vega	Roberto González	Samuel Pérez	Ricardo Quiñonez (I)	Others	No one
Polling firm	Fieldwork date	Sample size	Cabal	PODER	VIVA	CREO	Roots	Unionist	Others	No one
Estudio Electoral	27 July–1 August 2026	924	1.9%	0.9%	4.7%	12.3%	9.7%	6.1%	4.7% (Note: 3.8%: Ninotchka Matute (Roots) 0.9%: Nadia Castellanos (Elephant Community))	59.8%
