= Hiba Qasas =

Palestinian-Swiss activist

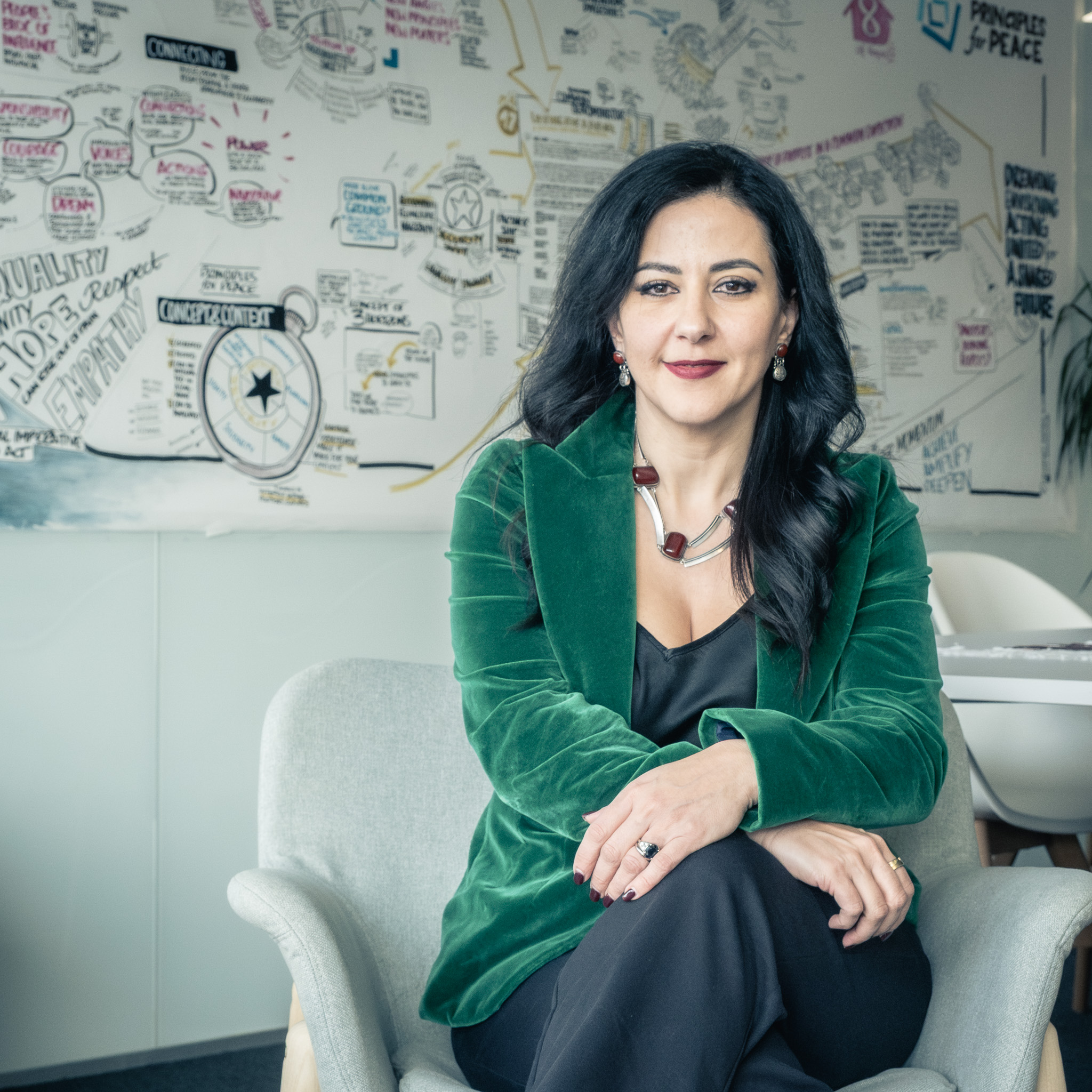
- Hiba Qasas, Geneva, 2025
- Born: Nablus, West Bank
- Education: University of Pavia
- Occupations: Peacebuilder; Executive Director
- Employer: Principles for Peace Foundation
- Known for: Founding Principles for Peace; convening Uniting for a Shared Future

Hiba Qasas (born 1980) is a Palestinian-Swiss conflict mediator and the Founding Executive Director of the Principles for Peace Foundation, based in Geneva, Switzerland.

Born in Nablus in the West Bank, she spent nearly two decades at the United Nations before leading the "Principles for Peace" initiative from 2020 and establishing the independent Principles for Peace Foundation in 2023. As part of her work with the foundation, she is the convenor of the Uniting for a Shared Future coalition, an Israeli-Palestinian initiative bringing together more than 550 leaders from politics, security, business, finance, civil society, media, and public life.

== Early life and education ==
Qasas was born in 1980 in Nablus, in the West Bank. She grew up during the First Intifada a period marked by school closures, curfews, and restrictions on movement. At the age of 19, she left the West Bank after receiving a scholarship to study in Italy. She earned a master’s degree in International Cooperation for Development from the University of Pavia in 2001. She later returned to work in her home country, in the West Bank, before pursuing an international career and eventually settling in Geneva, where she became a Swiss citizen.

== Career ==
=== Early work and United Nations ===
After completing her studies, Hiba Qasas worked with Palestinian non-governmental organisations on microfinance and rural development in the West Bank and Jerusalem, before joining the United Nations. She spent approximately 18 years at the UN, at both the United Nations Development Programme (UNDP) and UN Women, including serving as UN Women Country Representative in Iraq and as Chief of the Crisis Prevention, Preparedness and Response Office of UN Women in Geneva.

=== Principles for Peace Foundation ===
In 2020, Hiba Qasas became Head of the Secretariat of the Principles for Peace Initiative at Interpeace, a Geneva-based peacebuilding organisation. In 2023, Qasas co-founded the independent Principles for Peace Foundation in Geneva with Yves Daccord, and became the Foundation’s Founding Executive Director. Between 2020 and 2022, Principles for Peace led a global participatory process to develop new principles for achieving lasting peace, under the auspices of the International Commission on Inclusive Peace, which included Guatemalan President Bernardo Arévalo de León, General Roméo Dallaire, former Dutch Foreign Minister Bert Koenders, former UK Development Secretary Rory Stewart and Philippines peacemaker Teresita Quintos Deles. The process included more than 150 consultations across 61 countries, engagement with thousands of stakeholders from grassroots to state level, and analysis of over 700 research documents. The resulting eight "Principles for Peace" advocate for a new approach for peacebuilding and received recognition from the United Nations Security Council during a High-Level Open Debate in May 2023 as an important frame of reference for peacebuilding.

The organization has worked in several active conflict and post-conflict settings, including the Philippines, in relation to the Bangsamoro peace process, and in Somalia, where the principles were incorporated into the National Reconciliation Framework launched by the government in 2024, and the foundation later signed a partnership agreement with Somalia’s Interior Ministry to support implementation.

In October 2025, several Swiss newspapers — including 24 Heures, Blick, Tribune de Genève, and Tages-Anzeiger, as well as the Belgian daily Le Soir — reported that elements of the Trump administration's Gaza peace plan had been discussed previously in closed-door conferences in Geneva that Hiba Qasas had organised.

== See also ==
- Principles for Peace Foundation
- Interpeace
- Bangsamoro peace process
- Israeli–Palestinian peace process
