= Bernardo Arévalo =

President of Guatemala since 2024

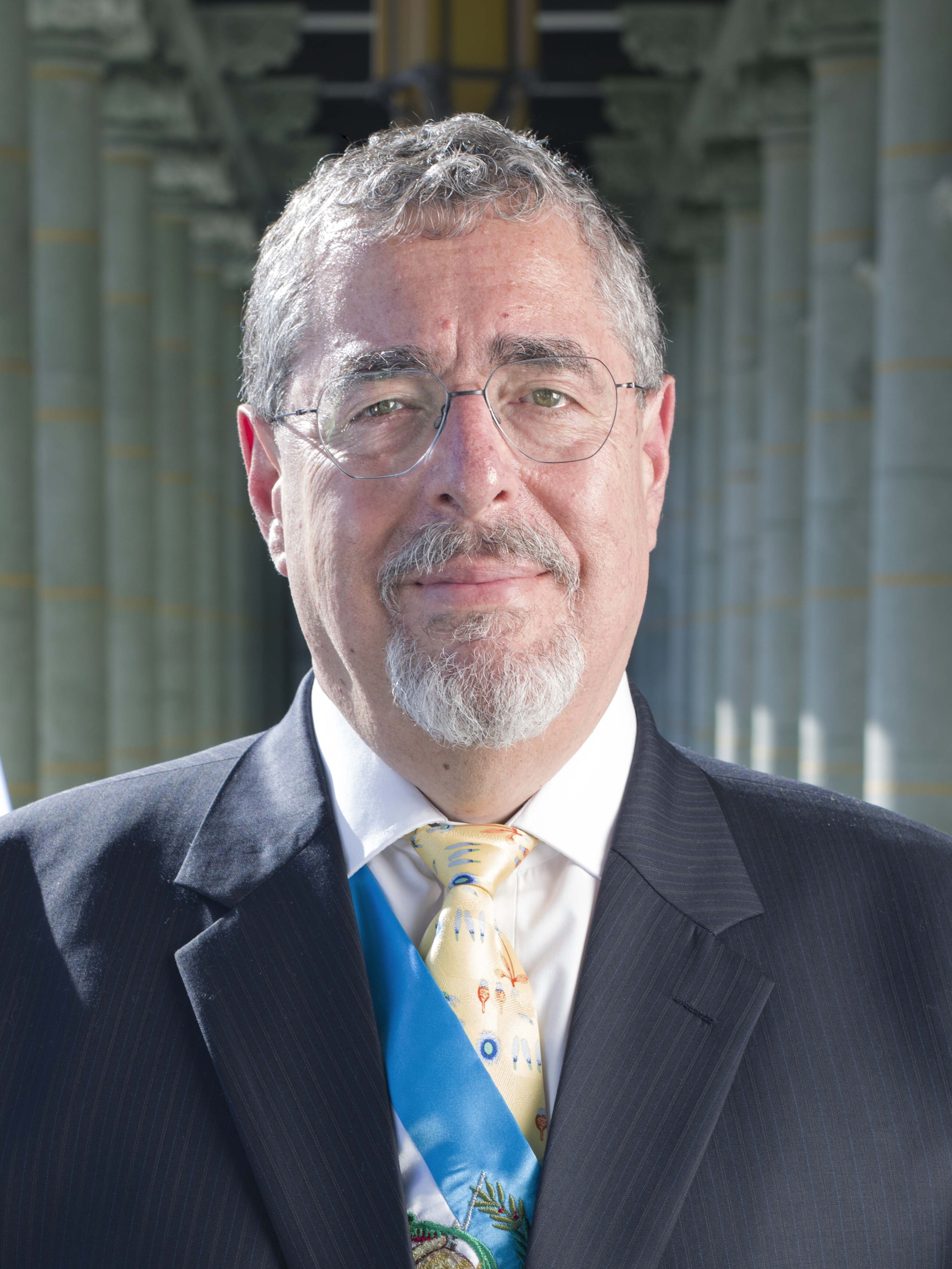
- Official portrait, 2024

52nd President of Guatemala
- Incumbent
- Assumed office 14 January 2024
- Vice President: Karin Herrera
- Preceded by: Alejandro Giammattei

Member of the Congress of Guatemala
- In office 14 January 2020 – 14 January 2024
- Constituency: National List

Guatemalan Ambassador to Spain
- In office 1995–1996
- President: Ramiro de León Carpio

Personal details
- Born: César Bernardo Arévalo de León; 7 October 1958 (age 68) Montevideo, Uruguay
- Party: Independent (2026–present)
- Other political affiliations: Movimiento Semilla (2017–2026)
- Spouse(s): Teresa Lapín (m. 1983; div. 1992) Eva Rivara Figueroa (m. 1993; div. 2004) Lucrecia Peinado (m. 2011)
- Children: 6 (3 stepchildren)
- Parents: Juan José Arévalo (father); Margarita de León (mother)
- Education: Hebrew University of Jerusalem (BA); Utrecht University (PhD)
- Occupation: Politician; diplomat; sociologist; author
- Website: President's website
- Bernardo Arévalo's voice Recorded July 2023

César Bernardo Arévalo de León (Latin American Spanish pronunciation: [beɾˈnaɾ.ðo aˈɾe.βa.lo]; born 7 October 1958) is a Guatemalan diplomat, sociologist, writer, and politician who has served as the 52nd president of Guatemala since 2024. A member and co-founder of the defunct Semilla party, he previously served as a deputy in the Congress of Guatemala from 2020 to 2024, as ambassador to Spain from 1995 to 1996 and as deputy minister of foreign affairs from 1994 to 1995.

Arévalo was born in Montevideo, Uruguay, during the exile of his father, former president Juan José Arévalo. He graduated from the Hebrew University of Jerusalem with a bachelor of arts in sociology. In the 1980s, Arévalo joined the Ministry of Foreign Affairs. He held several key positions, including deputy minister of foreign affairs and ambassador to Spain. After his diplomatic service, he joined Interpeace, where he served as an advisor on conflict resolution. Later, he graduated from Utrecht University with a doctorate in philosophy and social anthropology. Arévalo returned to Guatemala as a result of the 2015 protests, where he co-founded an analysis group that later became the Movimiento Semilla political party. He was elected as a member of Congress in the 2019 election, then as general secretary of the party in 2022.

Arévalo was nominated as a presidential candidate in the 2023 general election and, surprisingly qualified for the second round, triggering accusations of electoral fraud and a judicial investigation into his party and its members, threatening the election results, which was widely condemned nationally and internationally. He defeated former first lady Sandra Torres in the second round on 20 August 2023. His electoral victory made him the first son of a former Guatemalan president to be elected as president and the second individual not born in Guatemala to hold the office. The Organization of American States stepped in to support and facilitate the presidential transition. Arévalo was sworn in on 15 January, following a lengthy delay in the certification of the results by the outgoing Congress.

Arévalo's administration has been characterized by the implementation of primarily symbolic measures and by moderate legislative achievements in agriculture, health, economy, and infrastructure. Progress has also been recorded in education, labor, foreign relations, tourism, culture, and sports. He has faced strong opposition from the judiciary, the Congress of the Republic and the establishment. However, factors such as government inexperience, political miscalculations, the rising cost of living, and persistent violence have weakened his administration, leading to a decline in popularity and to widespread perceptions of a limited or ineffective government.

== Early life and education ==
Arévalo was born on 7 October 1958 in Montevideo, Uruguay, the son of Juan José Arévalo (1904–1990), president of Guatemala from 1945 to 1951, and his second wife, Margarita de León (born in 1925). At the time of Arévalo's birth, his father was living in political exile in South America following the 1954 Guatemalan coup d'état.

Arévalo's family left Uruguay when he was less than two years old, and he spent parts of his childhood living in Venezuela, Mexico, and Chile. He went to Guatemala for the first time at the age of 15 to study at the Liceo Guatemala, a private Catholic school in Guatemala City.

While his father was serving as the ambassador of Guatemala to Israel, Arévalo attended and graduated from the Hebrew University of Jerusalem with a bachelor's degree in sociology. At the Hebrew University, he studied the history of Christianity in Latin America. He then obtained a doctorate in philosophy and social anthropology from Utrecht University in the Netherlands.

== Diplomatic career ==
Arévalo joined the Ministry of Foreign Affairs during the 1980s as a diplomat. Between 1984 and 1986, he was the first secretary and consul at the Guatemalan embassy in Israel and subsequently acted as minister counselor from 1987 to 1988.

In 1988, Arévalo returned to Guatemala, where he was appointed deputy director of strategic studies and planning, again within the Ministry of Foreign Affairs. He went on to serve as director of bilateral foreign policy from 1990 to 1991, international bilateral relations from 1992 to 1993, and international economic and multilateral relations from 1993 to 1994.

In 1994, President Ramiro de León Carpio appointed Arévalo deputy minister of foreign affairs, a role Arévalo held until 1995. During his time as deputy minister, President of Mexico Ernesto Zedillo decorated Arévalo with the Order of the Aztec Eagle in 1995.

In 1995, Foreign Minister Alejandro Maldonado appointed Arévalo as Guatemala's ambassador to Spain; that same year, he presented his credentials to King Juan Carlos I. In 1996, Arévalo left his position as ambassador as well as the Ministry of Foreign Affairs.

== Professional career ==
After leaving his career as a diplomat, Arévalo served on the Center for Mesoamerican Regional Research (CIRMA) board and acted as its president. From 1999, Arévalo held various roles at Interpeace, including advising on peacebuilding and conflict resolution in Africa, Asia, and Latin America.

In addition to his peacekeeping work, Arévalo also worked as an advisor to organizations, including the United Nations, the United States Institute of Peace, and the University of San Diego. He has written books and articles on history, politics, sociology, and diplomacy.

== Political career ==
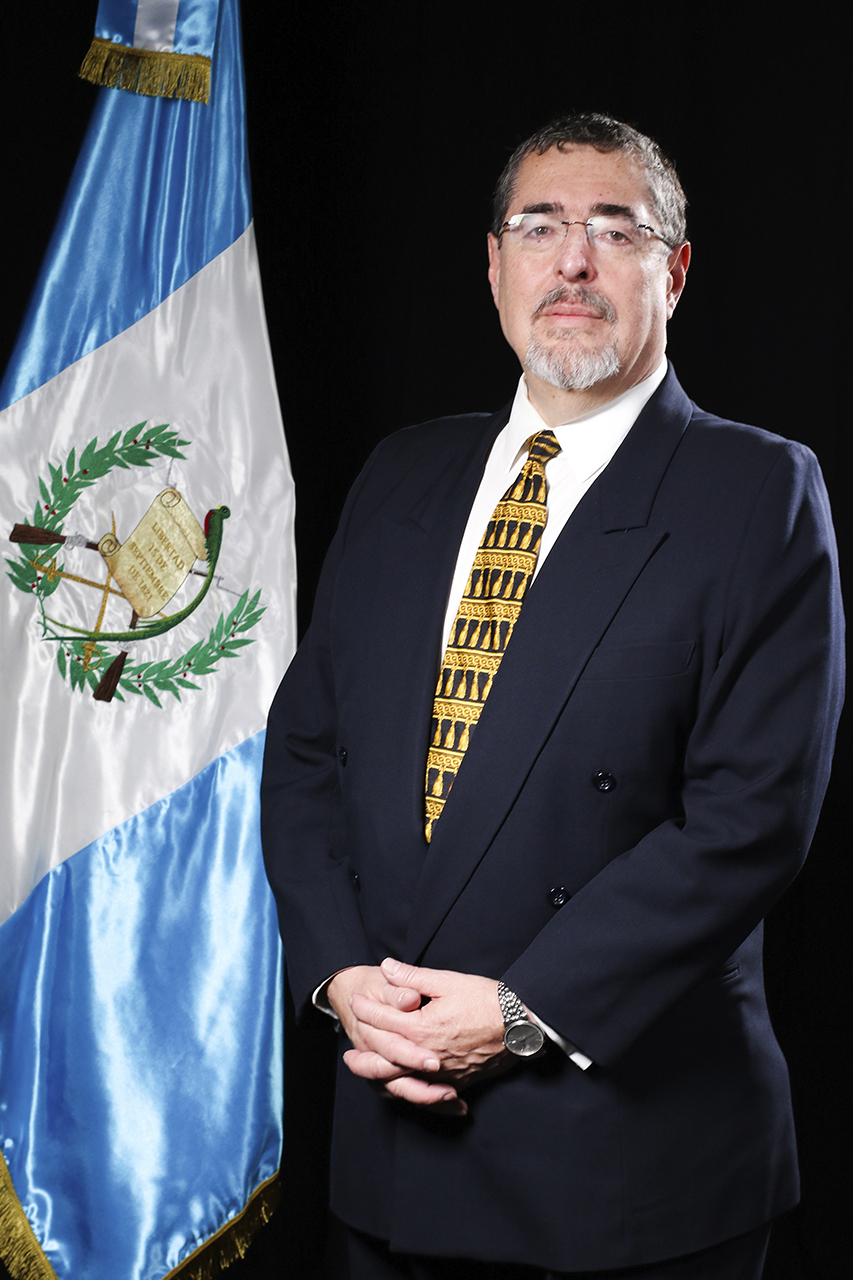
Official portrait of Arévalo as a deputy of the Guatemalan Congress

In 2015, Arévalo took part in the 2015 Guatemalan protests demanding the resignation of President Otto Pérez Molina. Shortly after the demonstrations, Arévalo was among a group of intellectuals who formed Semilla, a think tank that subsequently was developed into the political party Movimiento Semilla ("Seed Movement") in 2017.

Arévalo was announced as Semilla's preferred candidate for the 2019 presidential election but ultimately declined the candidacy. He was succeeded by Thelma Aldana, who was eventually prohibited from running. Arévalo instead ran as a candidate for Congress on the national list and was elected as a congressman in the first round of the 2019 general election, becoming one of seven candidates from the Semilla party to win a seat for the ninth session of Congress. After taking office on 14 January 2020, he served on the committees for foreign affairs, governance, human rights, national security, and national defense and led the Semilla parliamentary bloc between 2020 and 2022. In 2022, he was elected as the general secretary of Semilla, succeeding Samuel Pérez Álvarez.

During his four years as a deputy, Arévalo took on the role of a rapporteur for several bills. These bills dealt with various issues such as cutting off cellular connections to prisons, extending social security benefits to migrants, deputies, and workers in the informal sector, providing stricter penalties for animal abuse, and regulating the prices of pharmaceutical products.

During the COVID-19 pandemic, Arévalo and the other members of the Semilla party introduced a bill that would have provided temporary relief to the populace. The bill proposed a budget of 10 million quetzals, with each person receiving 1500 quetzals per month for the duration of the pandemic. In March 2022, Arévalo was the rapporteur for a legislative proposal calling on President Alejandro Giammattei to take action against Russia following its invasion of Ukraine. The proposal included the cancellation of the mining license of the Compañía Guatemalteca de Níquel, a nickel-mining company that is owned by the Russian company Solway Investment Group. In addition, the legislation called for the cancellation of the contract with the Russian government regarding the Sputnik V vaccines.

== 2023 presidential campaign ==
On 22 January 2023, Arévalo was announced as Semilla's presidential candidate for the 2023 election, running alongside Karin Herrera as his vice-presidential running mate. He was officially registered by the Supreme Electoral Tribunal on 16 February 2023. During his campaign, his supporters referred to him as Tío Bernie (transl. Uncle Bernie) in reference to both his name and his similarity to American politician and former presidential candidate Bernie Sanders.

Arévalo's campaigning focused on addressing state corruption and insecurity in Guatemala, as well as generating employment opportunities and promoting climate change policies.

Initial polling by Prensa Libre in April 2023 showed Arévalo ranked next to last among the candidates, with 0.7% of people polled stating their intention to vote for him. Subsequent polls showed support for Arévalo hovering around 2% in June and May 2023.

During the first round of the 2023 election, Arévalo placed second with over 600,000 votes and faced a second-round run-off against Sandra Torres, a former first lady of Guatemala and candidate of the National Unity of Hope party. Arévalo's second place was described as a "surprise" by El País and BBC News. Semilla also received a large share of the votes, positioning it as the third largest party in Congress, the Central American Parliament, and the Guatemala City municipal government.

=== Certification and legal challenges ===
The certification of the results was delayed due to a controversial appeal granted by the Constitutional Court to nine right-wing parties, including the ruling party, Vamos. Those parties challenged the result, alleging "irregularities" and "electoral fraud" in favor of Arévalo, and went as far as to request a fresh election. The Court ordered a new review of the contested results, which was carried out during the first week of July. The new review found no significant changes in the preliminary results. Subsequently, the Supreme Court dismissed the appeal made by the parties and authorized the Supreme Electoral Court to formalize the election results.

On 12 July 2023, the TSE formalized the election results; at the same time, prosecutor Rafael Curruchiche of the Public Prosecution Service announced, at the request of Judge Fredy Orellana, the suspension of Semilla due to allegations of falsifying signatures to establish the party in 2017. Arévalo, in a CNN interview, stated that he would challenge the suspension, claiming that the court had "no legal substance" to make the order. Similarly, legal experts affirmed that Orellana did not act in accordance with the country's election laws.

On 13 July 2023, the Constitutional Court, the highest court for constitutional law, guaranteed Arévalo's participation although it was ambiguous about the status of the party, allowing the second round of the presidential election to proceed. Nevertheless, demonstrations were organized calling for the resignation of Attorney General María Consuelo Porras, prosecutor Curruchiche, and Judge Orellana. Arévalo and his vice presidential candidate, Karin Herrera, were present at the demonstration and filed a criminal complaint against Curruchiche and Orellana.

Members of the United States Congress called on President Joe Biden to impose sanctions on those responsible for "threatening democracy" in Guatemala and expressed concerns about actions being taken against Arévalo's candidacy. Twenty former leaders from Latin America and Spain issued a joint statement condemning attempts made to disqualify Arévalo from the election, and compared it to the recent disqualification of Venezuelan opposition leader María Corina Machado.

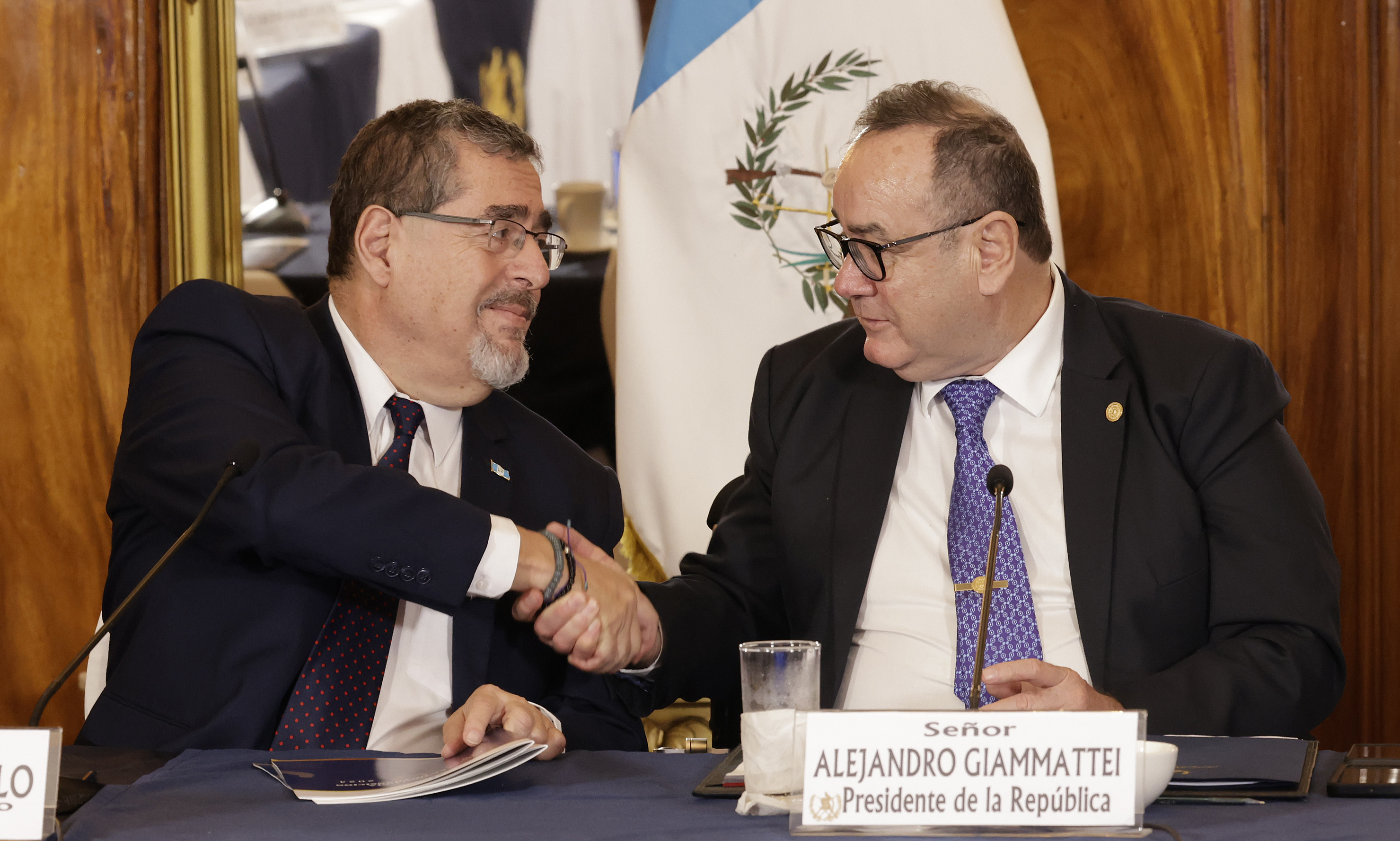
President-elect Bernardo Arévalo (left) and outgoing president Alejandro Giammattei meet in the presidential residency as part of the presidential transition, September 2023.

=== Presidential transition ===
The Electoral and Political Party Act restricts a political party's general secretary from presiding over the executive branch. Accordingly, on 29 November, Arévalo renounced his affiliation with Semilla and stepped down as the party's general secretary.

On 8 January 2024, Arévalo and Vice President-elect Herrera held a press conference at the Centro Cultural Miguel Ángel Asturias to present the individuals who would serve as ministers in Arévalo's cabinet. The cabinet would have been composed of seven men and seven women. However, on 10 January, two days after the announcement, Anayté Guardado, Arévalo's candidate for the Ministry of Energy and Mines, declined the nomination due to controversy that arose on X when a 2018 interview of her resurfaced that showed her support for hydroelectric plants—a contributor to deforestation in Guatemala. Allegations also arose about Guardado's involvement in the imprisonment of Bernardo Caal, an Indigenous rights activist. Ultimately, Víctor Hugo Ventura Ruiz replaced Guardado as the nominee for the Ministry.

== Presidency (2024–present) ==
=== Inauguration ===
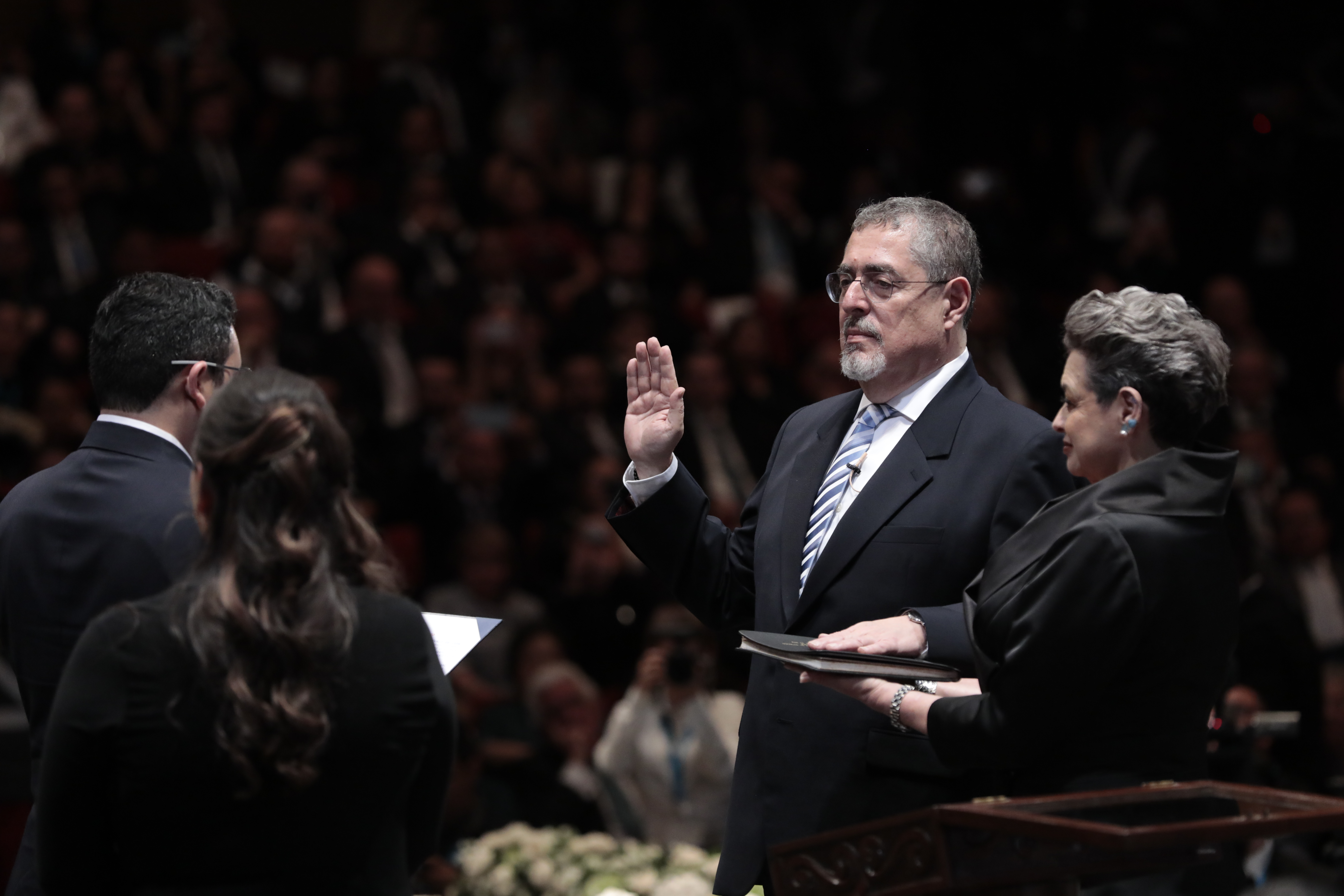
Arévalo takes the oath of office administered by President of Congress Samuel Pérez, 15 January 2024

Arévalo was inaugurated as the 52nd president of Guatemala on 15 January 2024, at 12:20 am CT. His inauguration was scheduled to be on 14 January but was delayed following the failure of the event's overseeing commission to approve the event's congressional delegation. He is the first president to be the son of a former Guatemalan president and the second president to be born outside of Guatemalan territory (after Miguel García Granados).

=== First 100 days ===
In his first days in office, Arévalo reversed a government agreement signed by his predecessor that would have granted security and vehicles to former officials from the Giammattei cabinet for six years.

On 18–19 January Arévalo ordered the removal of metal barriers from the presidential residency and National Palace. These barriers were initially installed in 2016 during the Jimmy Morales administration and remained in place under Alejandro Giammattei. The Arévalo government characterized the gesture "as a symbol of accessibility and closeness" towards the populace. After the removal of the railings, the Ministry of Culture and Sports reported a 43% increase in visits to the National Palace for the month of February.

Between 17 January to 5 February, Arévalo and his cabinet dismissed several heads of government agencies, including the National Institute of Electrification (INDE), the Institute of Victim, and the General Directorate of Civil Aeronautics. These dismissals were attributed to the fact that the agency heads were linked to "acts of corruption" or had not "efficiently fulfilled" their duties. A total of 878 government employees were removed from their positions during Arévalo's first 30 days in office.

On 8 February, Arévalo and Francisco Jiménez, the Minister of the Interior, announced the creation of the Special Group Against Extortion (GECE), a special force within the National Civil Police (PNC) aimed at combatting violent crime and extortions. The GECE will consist of 400 motorized officers who will patrol different regions of the country in phases. At the request of Arévalo, the United States government donated equipment to support the new task force.

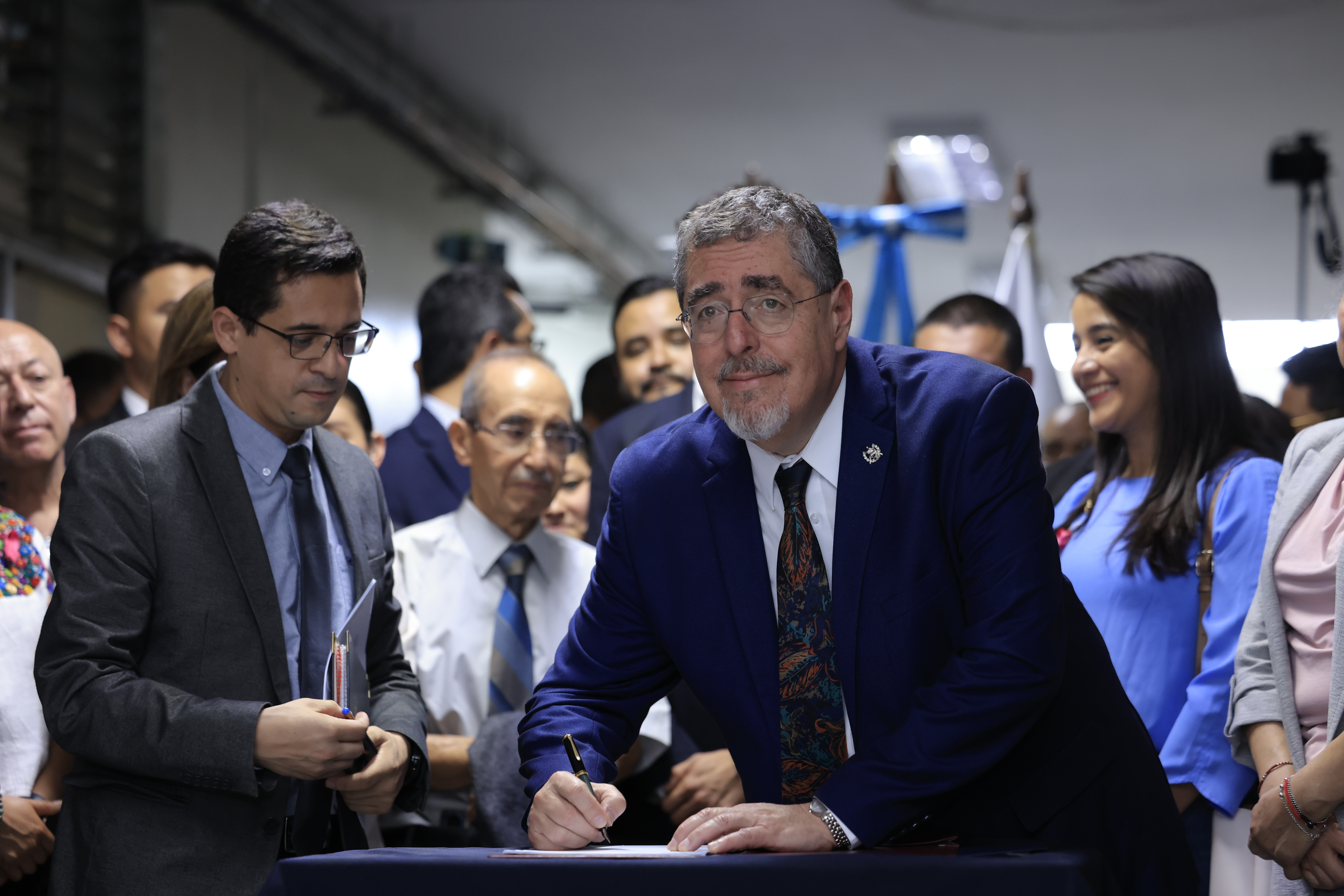
Arévalo signs the Comprehensive Cancer Care Law, 22 March 2024

During his first trip as president to Europe, from 15 to 23 February, Arévalo temporarily delegated his duties to Vice President Herrera, as established by the Constitution. His itinerary included various activities and high-level meetings in different European countries. In Germany, he participated in the 60th Munich Security Conference and met with German Chancellor Olaf Scholz, Bulgarian Prime Minister Nikolai Denkov, Israeli President Isaac Herzog and Ukrainian President Volodymyr Zelenskyy. Later, on 19 February, he arrived in France to meet with French President Emmanuel Macron at the Élysée Palace. The next day, in Belgium, he held meetings with the President of the European Council Charles Michel, and the European High Representative of Foreign Affairs Josep Borrell, thus marking the first visit by a Guatemalan president to the seat of the European Union. On 21 February, Arévalo moved to Switzerland, where he held a meeting with the president of the International Olympic Committee Thomas Bach, who confirmed the elimination of sanctions on the Guatemalan Olympic Committee. Then, on 22 February, he arrived in Spain to meet with the Prime Minister Pedro Sánchez, and attend a banquet offered by King Felipe VI and Queen Letizia. Finally, on 24 February, Arévalo returned to Guatemala.

On 9 March 2024, Congress passed the Comprehensive Cancer Care Law, a bill that was first introduced in July 2022. The act provides millions of quetzals to the Ministry of Health to boost training and research, establish a specialized hospital, and the promotion of cancer care through early detection, prevention, palliative care, and free treatment. Arévalo signed the bill on 22 March 2024.

Some analysts have detected "slowness in decision-making" during the first days of Arévalo's presidency, as well as a "lack of strategy" to achieve the departure of Attorney General María Consuelo Porras and maintain a stable legislative alliance (which fragmented at the end of March).

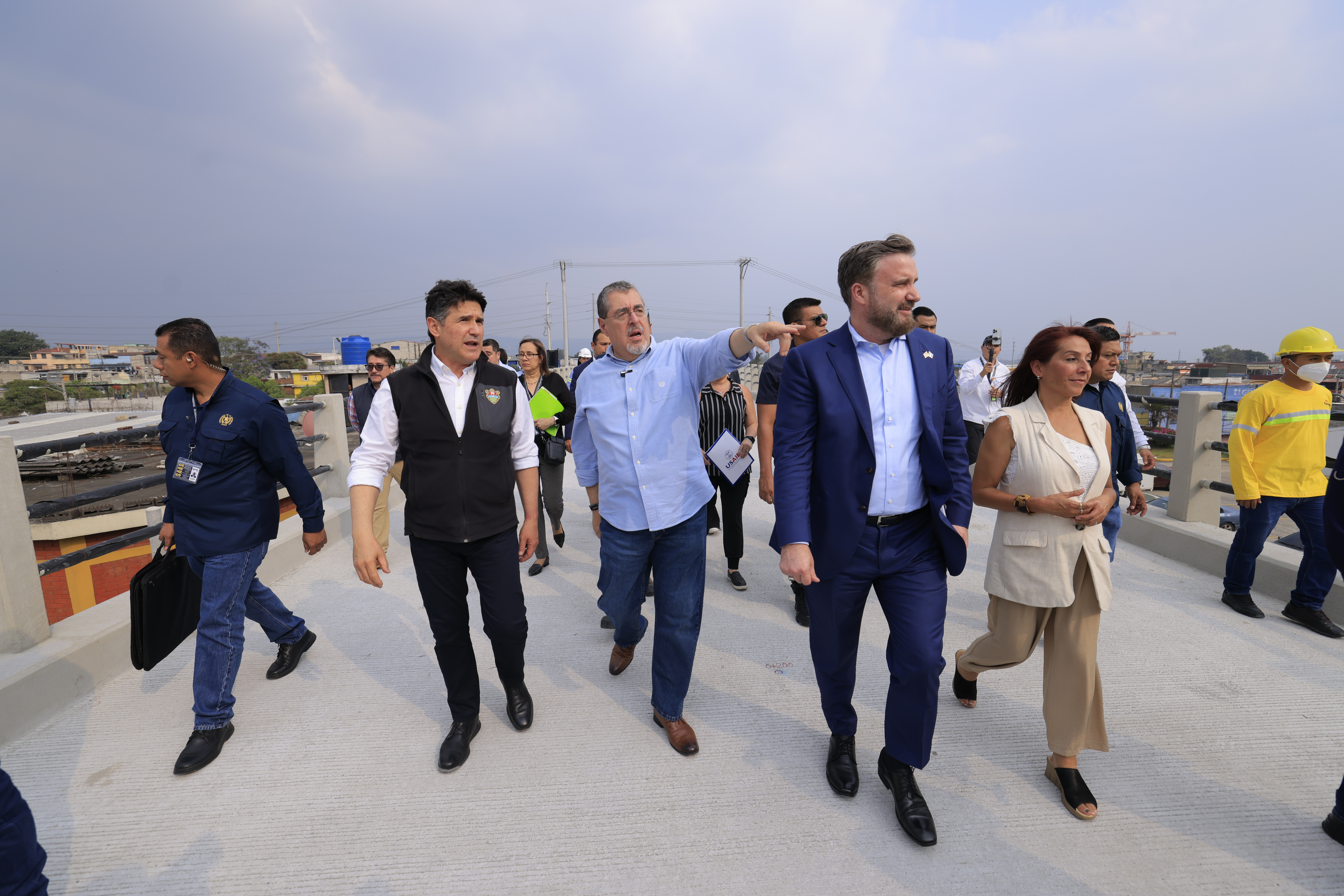
Arévalo supervises construction progress for Metro Riel

On 7 April 2024, Arévalo dismissed Minister of Environment María José Iturbide. His decision came after a report was published by Vox Populi on 4 April, which revealed that María Fernanda Iturbide, daughter of Minister Iturbide, had used state vehicles for personal activities. The Secretary General of the Presidency published a statement on behalf of Arévalo, stating that the decision was made to "avoid any doubt about the commitment of his administration and tolerance to the misuse of State resources and corruption". On 11 April, Arévalo appointed Patricia Orantes as Iturbide's replacement.

On 11 April, Arévalo together with the Minister of Infrastructure Jazmín de la Vega, the mayor of Guatemala City Ricardo Quiñónez, the United States ambassador to Guatemala Tobin Bradley and the Guatemala City councilor of Semilla Ninotchka Matute supervised the progress of the construction of the first phase of Metro Riel, one of the priorities of the Arévalo government.

On 23 April, during a public event marking the first 100 days of his government, Arévalo fulfilled one of his campaign promises by reducing the presidential salary by 25%. As a result of this reduction, the head of state of Guatemala is no longer the highest-paid president in Latin America. Concurrently, Vice President Herrera also announced a 25% reduction in her salary.

=== Domestic policy ===
==== Education ====
On 4 February 2024, Arévalo announced a school remodeling program through the Ministry of Education with the aim of renovating 10,000 schools by the end of 2024. In June 2024, the Ministry of Education reported finishing renovating 4,000 schools.

==== Subsequent dismissals ====
On 17 May, Arévalo dismissed Minister of Communications, Infrastructure, and Housing Jazmín de la Vega. The decision was prompted by Minister Vega's authorization of payments to several construction companies that went against the terms of the government contract.

==== Efforts to dismiss Consuelo Porras ====
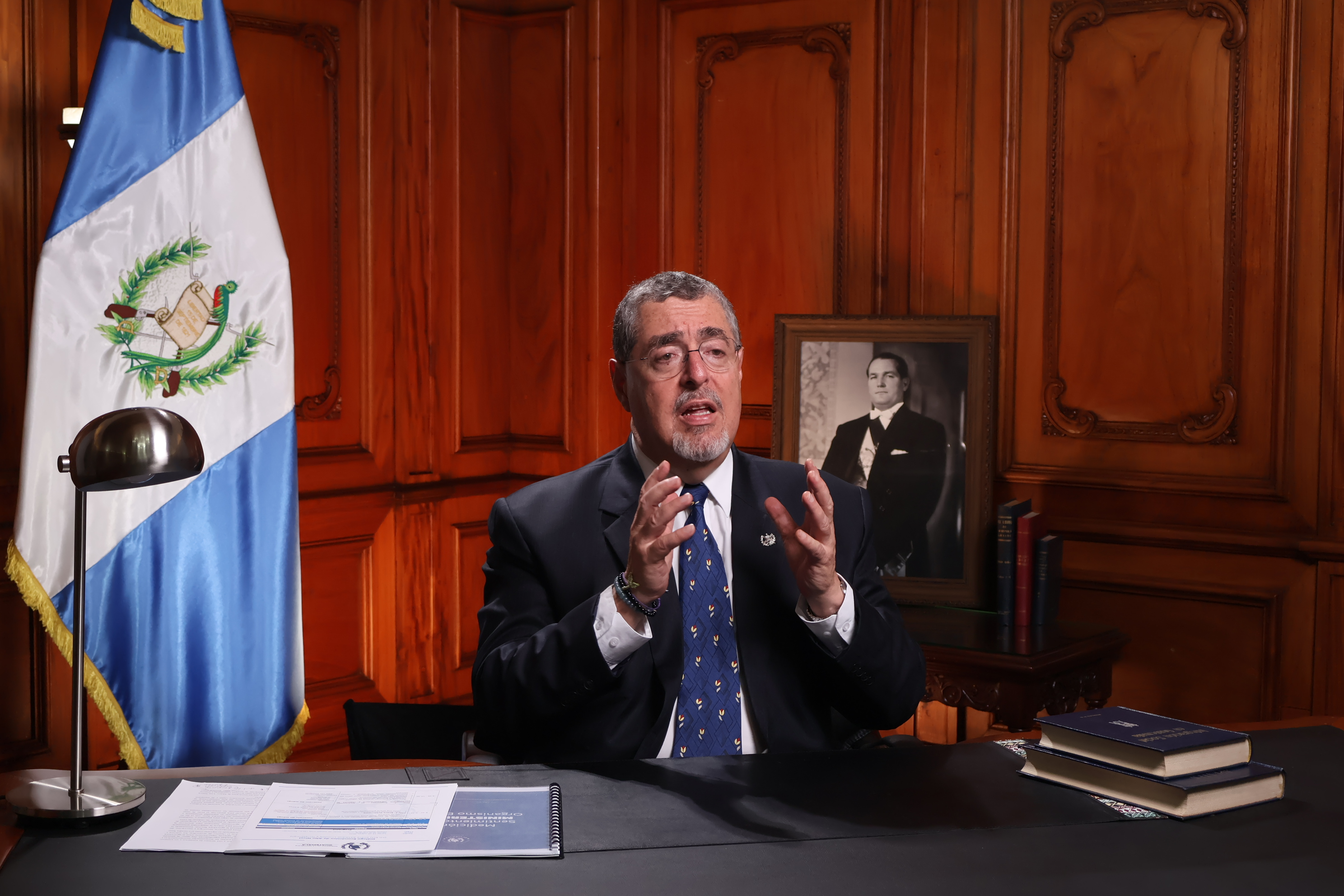
President Arévalo addresses the nation concerning his intention to remove Consuelo Porras from her post of Attorney General, 6 May 2024

On 5 May 2024, Arévalo delivered a nationally televised speech in which he called for the removal of María Consuelo Porras from her position as Attorney General. In his speech, he reported his intentions to reform the organic law through Congress, so that the "Public Prosecutor's Office does not again be used as a political weapon by any government." On 6 May, Arévalo alongside members of his cabinet walked from the National Palace to Congress to deliver the bill that allowed for the dismissal of Porras. However, Congress failed to hold a plenary session for the bill, and negotiations for it stalled until 1 August, when legislators were scheduled to return from recess.

==== Energy subsidy ====
On 31 May, Arévalo announced the expansion of energy subsidies to individuals who consumed up to 99 kilowatts per month (previously 89 kilowatts). The social tariff is estimated to cover 300,000 more users and will remain in effect until December 2024.

=== Foreign policy ===
==== Cuba ====
Unlike all his predecessors, Arévalo maintained a distant relationship with Cuba. At the end of 2025, Arévalo terminated an agreement signed in 1998 that allowed more than 400 Cuban doctors to provide services in the rural areas.

==== Nicaragua ====
Arévalo has had a tense relationship with the Daniel Ortega regime in Nicaragua. On 5 September 2024, the US State Department secured the release of 135 Nicaraguan political prisoners, and the Guatemalan government agreed to take them in. In November 2024, the governments of Guatemala, Costa Rica, Panama and the Dominican Republic opposed the nomination of former Nicaraguan Foreign Minister Denis Moncada as the new secretary general of the Central American Integration System (SICA). In response, Nicaragua announced that it would retaliate.

==== Palestine ====
On 10 May 2024, the Arévalo administration voted in favor of upgrading Palestine's rights in the United Nations as an Observer State.

==== Russia ====
The Arévalo government has kept its distance from Russia, mainly because of its support for Ukraine. Arévalo spoke out against Russia's inclusion as an observer state in the Central American Parliament, calling it "inconsistent" for a state that "does not respect the norms of international law".

==== Taiwan ====
The Arévalo administration has maintained diplomatic relations with Taiwan and has expressed interest in maintaining them throughout his term. Early in his administration, Arévalo was congratulated by a bipartisan group of U.S. senators (included Marco Rubio and Ben Cardin) for maintaining his pro-Taiwan stance.

On 5 June 2025, Arévalo made a state visit to Taiwan, where he met with president Lai Ching-te and reaffirmed Guatemala's support for Taiwan, and vowed to continue to strengthen the ties between both nations.

==== Venezuela ====
The Arévalo administration rejected the results announced by the National Electoral Council for the 2024 Venezuelan presidential election. In a press conference on 5 August, Arévalo announced that his government would not recognize Nicolás Maduro as the president-elect of Venezuela. He would also condemn the repression made by the Venezuelan government against domestic protests that broke out in the aftermath of the election.

In September 2024, he maintained telephone contact with María Corina Machado and Edmundo González Urrutia, where he expressed the support of the Guatemalan government. He subsequently contacted his counterparts Santiago Peña of Paraguay and Luis Lacalle Pou of Uruguay to monitor the situation.

== Political positions ==
Arévalo claims the political legacy of his father, Juan José Arévalo, and former president Jacobo Árbenz. He has described himself as a "social democrat" and favors a republican and democratic system. He believes in a state that guarantees social justice and private property and expresses an interest in establishing a new fiscal pact and strengthening social security.

=== Education ===
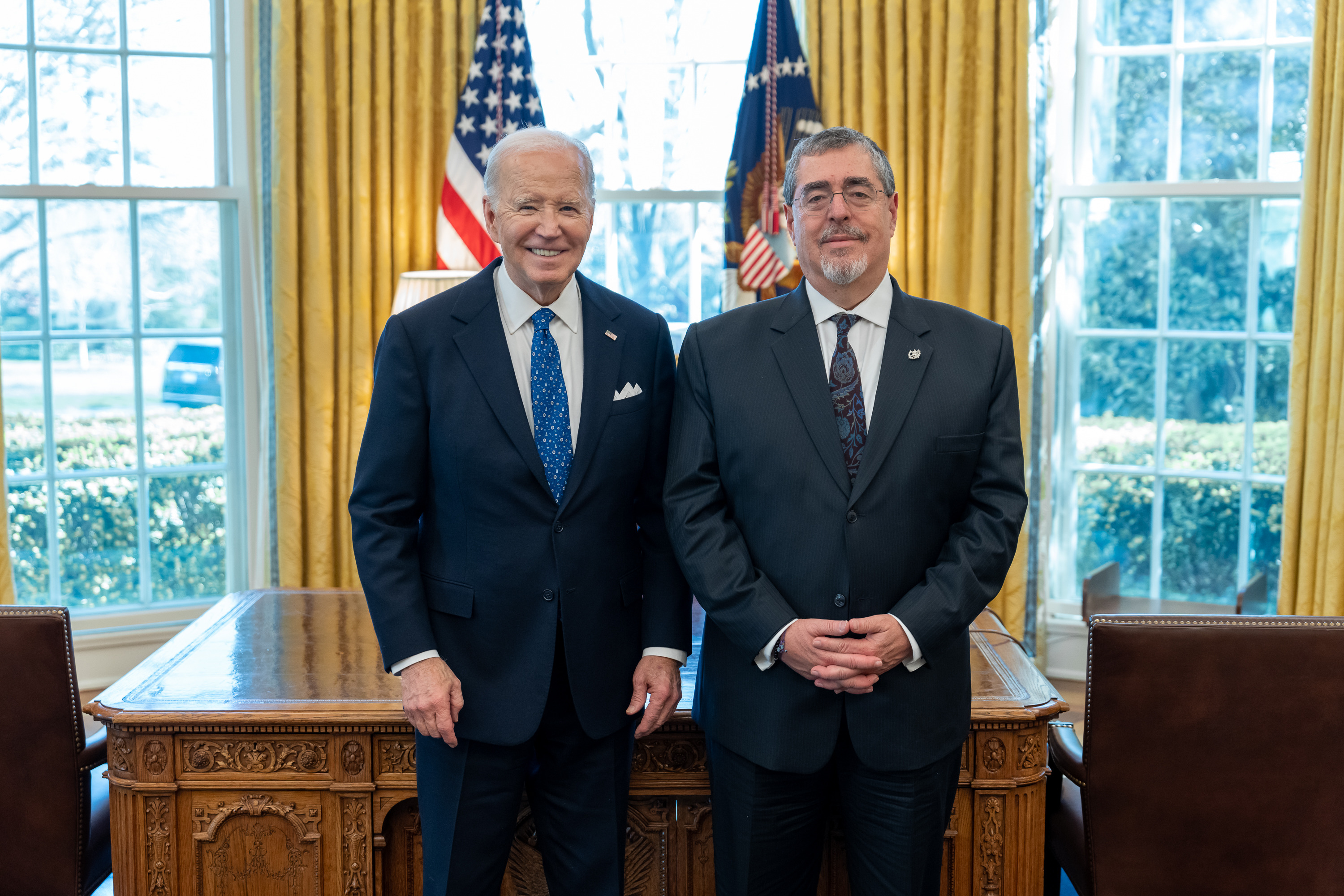
Arévalo meets US President Joe Biden in the White House, 25 March 2024

One of Arévalo's campaign pledges is to adopt a "radically different" public education system. He aims to address the poor conditions found in primary and secondary schools by investing Q110 billion, which would go towards creating 70,000 new classrooms, 29.5 million textbooks, 36,000 new restrooms for faculty and students, and monthly scholarships of 3,600 for students.

=== Health ===
Arévalo favors universal healthcare. He proposes a Q61 billion government budget to cover 7 million people by building 400 new health posts and 50 health centers for regions of more than 15,000 residents and isolated rural areas.

Arévalo has also committed to the construction of a public hospital that specializes in cancer treatment.

=== Foreign policy ===
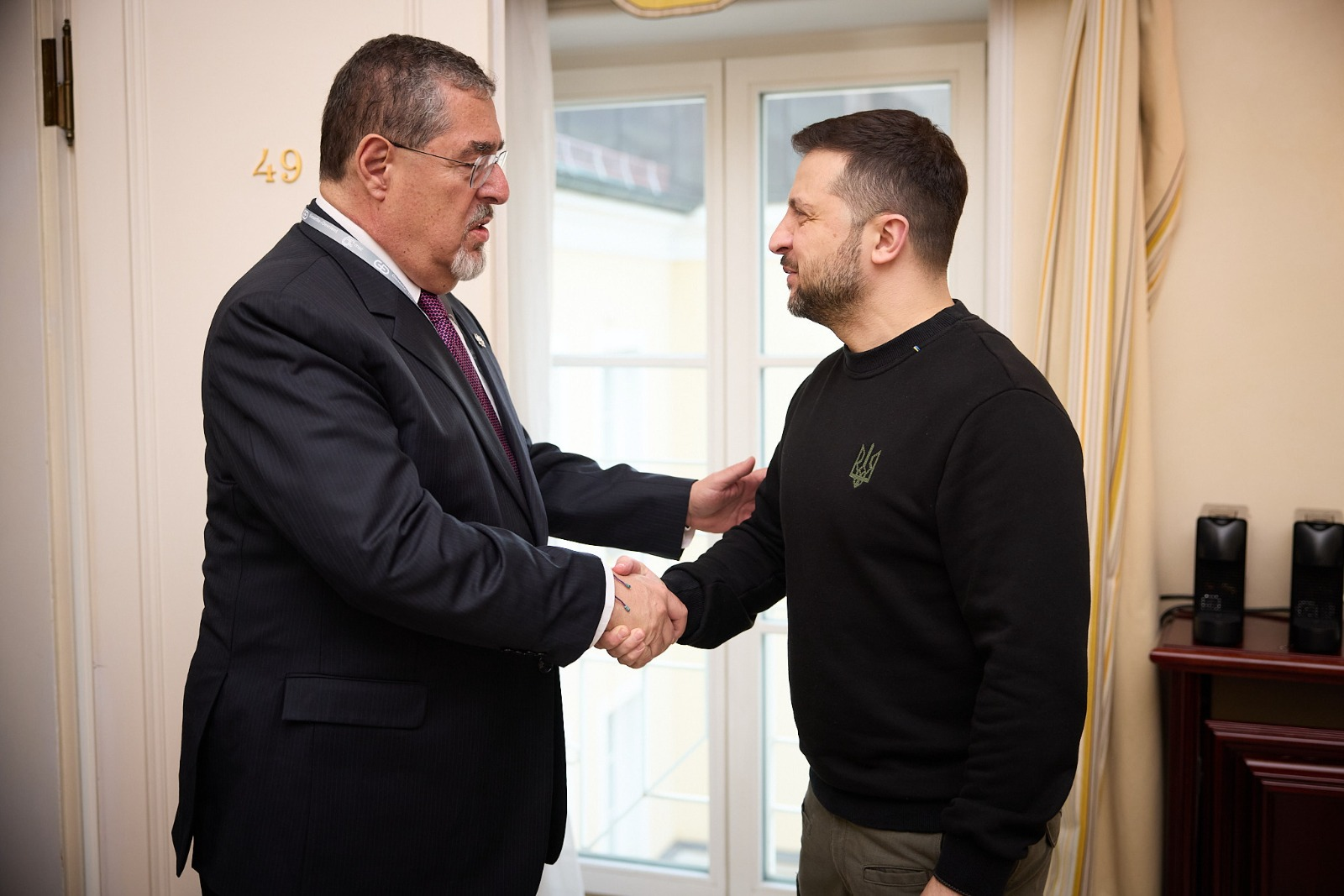
Arévalo greets Ukrainian president Volodymyr Zelenskyy in Munich, Germany, 18 February 2024

Arévalo is in favor of improving trade relations with China but also desires to maintain diplomatic relations with Taiwan. On 20 July, in an interview with República, he reassured his interest in building a relationship with China based on "developing and expanding" economic relations.

Arévalo has condemned the government of Nicaragua and has described the governments of Nicaragua and Venezuela as "dictatorial systems". In March 2022, Arévalo was the rapporteur of a legislative proposal that sought to urge President Alejandro Giammattei to take action against Russia for its invasion of Ukraine. The proposal included the cancellation of the mining license of the Compañía Guatemalteca de Níquel, a nickel-mining company that is owned by the Russian Solway Group. In addition, the legislation called for the cancellation of the contract with the Russian government regarding the Sputnik V vaccines.

=== Social issues ===
Arévalo has ruled out the possibility of legalizing same-sex marriage and abortion (which is only permitted in Guatemala if the mother's life is in danger), but he has also stated that he will not tolerate discrimination due to religion and sexual orientation.

== Personal life ==
Arévalo has been married three times. In 1983, he married Argentine citizen Teresa Lapín Ganman; they divorced in 1992. The following year, Arévalo married Eva Rivara Figueroa, a fellow diplomat, with whom he had two daughters. Since 2011, Arévalo has been married to Lucrecia Peinado. He has three daughters and three stepchildren.

In addition to his native Spanish, Arévalo speaks English, Hebrew, French, and Portuguese. He is a Catholic.

During the election campaign, in a TikTok video, Arévalo referred to the 2009 Kanye West–Taylor Swift incident where he revealed himself to be a fan of Taylor Swift. The video quickly went viral among young voters, which successfully boosted his presidential campaign during the first round.

== Honors ==
- Order of the Aztec Eagle (Mexico, 1995)

== See also ==
- List of current heads of state and government
- List of heads of the executive by approval rating

Party political offices
| Preceded by Thelma Aldana | Semilla nominee for President of Guatemala; 2023 | Most recent |
Political offices
| Preceded by Alejandro Giammattei | President of Guatemala; 2024–present | Incumbent |
