= Norma Zea =

Guatemalan civil engineer and politician)

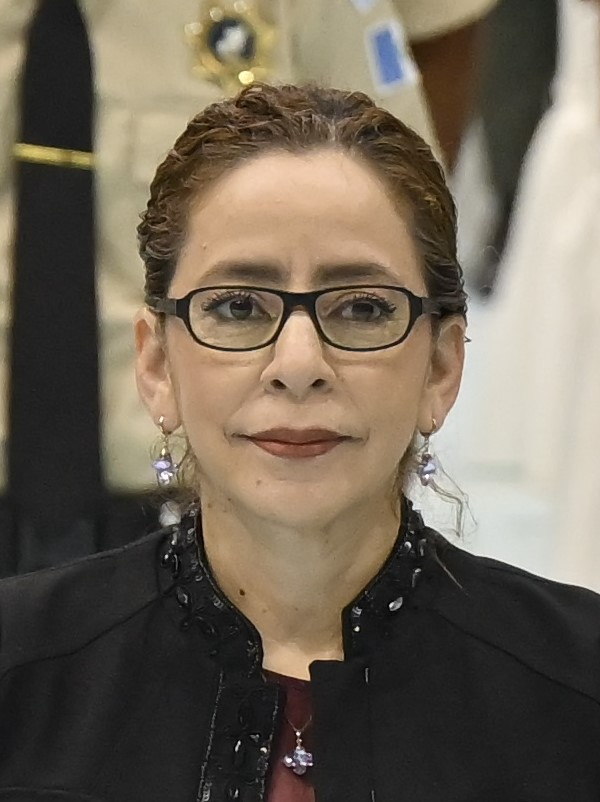
- Norma Zea in 2025

Minister of Communications, Infrastructure and Housing
- Incumbent
- Assumed office 28 November 2025
- President: Bernardo Arévalo
- Preceded by: Miguel Ángel Díaz

Personal details
- Party: Independent
- Education: Universidad de San Carlos de Guatemala

Norma Lissette Zea Osorio is a Guatemalan civil engineer and politician who has been serving as Minister of Communications, Infrastructure and Housing of Guatemala since 2025. She previously served as Deputy Minister of Infrastructure and advisor to the President’s Private Secretariat on strategic management.

== Education ==
Zea graduated with a degree in civil engineering from Universidad de San Carlos de Guatemala and went on to obtain a master’s degree in engineering sciences.

== Career ==
Her 20-year professional career includes planning and consultancy for infrastructure projects and the management of public-private partnerships, as well as the coordination of municipal development projects and national infrastructure plans. She also served as advisor to the President’s Private Secretariat on strategic management, and in August 2025, she was appointed Deputy Minister of Infrastructure.

Following the dismissal of Miguel Ángel Díaz, Zea was appointed Minister of Communications, Infrastructure and Housing on the 28 November 2025 by President Bernardo Arevalo. On 15 January 2026 she presented six infrastructure projects with United States support.
