= Xol =

Xol is a surname. Notable people with the surname include:

- Bernardo Caal Xol (born 1972), Guatemalan human rights activist
- Herlinda Xol (born 1971), Guatemalan long-distance runner
- Eduardo Xol (1966–2024), American television personality and businessman
