= Diego Arzú =

Guatemalan politician (born 1973)

Member of the Central American Parliament for Guatemala
- In office 27 January 2016 – 14 January 2020

Fifth Councillor of Guatemala City
- In office 15 January 2000 – 15 January 2004
- Mayor: Fritz García Gallont
- Preceded by: Roberto Díaz Marroquín
- Succeeded by: Roberto González Díaz-Durán

Personal details
- Born: 1973 (age 51–52); Guatemala City
- Political party: Unionist Party (since 2002); National Advancement Party (1989−2002)
- Parents: Álvaro Arzú Irigoyen (father); Silvia García-Granados (mother)

Diego Arzú García-Granados (born 1973) is a Guatemalan politician and businessman. Arzú is the secondborn of the former President of Guatemala and mayor of Guatemala City Álvaro Arzú Irigoyen. Diego Arzú served from 2016 to 2020 as deputy to the Central American Parliament.

His possible connection with the assassination of Monsignor Juan Gerardi was investigated by the Public Ministry of Guatemala, however it was not possible to prove the hypothesis.
