= Juan Francisco Solórzano Foppa =

Guatemalan attorney and prosecutor (1983–2026)

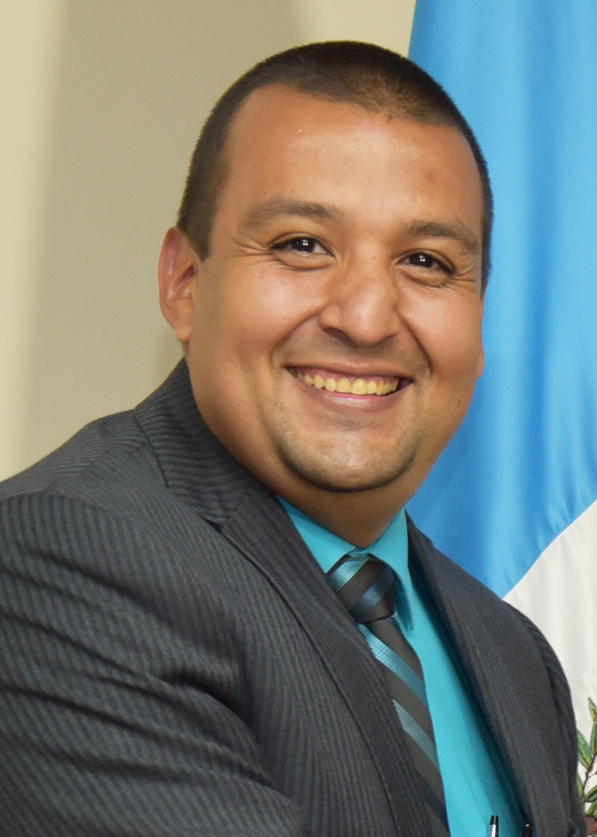
- Foppa in 2017

Head of the Tax Administration Superintendency
- In office 9 March 2016 – 15 January 2018
- President: Jimmy Morales
- Preceded by: Juan Francisco Rivera
- Succeeded by: Abel Cruz Calderón

Personal details
- Born: 26 July 1983 Nicaragua
- Died: 17 October 2026 (aged 43) Guatemala City, Guatemala
- Cause of death: Assassination by gunshot
- Relatives: Alaide Foppa (grandmother)
- Education: Rafael Landívar University

Juan Francisco Solórzano Foppa (Note: Solórzano Foppa is his mother's surname; his father was Carlos Enrique López Arévalo. He was commonly known as "Foppa".) (26 July 1983 – 17 October 2026) was a Guatemalan prosecutor, anti-corruption activist and politician. He was best known for his work to stop government corruption and organized crime. He served as the head of the Tax Administration Superintendency, Guatemala's tax agency, before being removed by the president, and he previously headed criminal investigations at the Attorney General of Guatemala's office. He ran for mayor of Guatemala City in 2023. On October 17, 2026, he was assassinated while attending a football match in Guatemala City.

== Life and career ==
Foppa was born on 26 July 1983 in Nicaragua, according to Silvia Solórzano Foppa, his mother. He was the grandson of poet and activist Alaíde Foppa, who was forcibly disappeared three years prior. His father, Carlos Enrique López Arévalo, "Comandante Camilo", was a leftist guerrilla fighter during the Guatemalan Civil War and was killed two weeks after his son's birth. His mother was also a guerrilla. He grew up in Cuba before the family returned to Guatemala following the signing of the Peace Accords in 1996. Foppa decided to study law and attended Rafael Landívar University.

Foppa began as an assistant prosecutor in the Attorney General of Guatemala's office, where among other cases, he prosecuted homicides and organized crime. He then became head of an office for criminal investigations that had been newly created in 2013. As head, he was responsible for the investigation and arrest of President Otto Pérez Molina for allegedly leading the bribery ring known as La Línea. He also investigated the customs tax department and headed the investigation of steel company Aceros de Guatemala.

In March 2016, President Jimmy Morales appointed him to head the Tax Administration Superintendency as Superintendent, which made him in charge of Guatemala's tax collection. Conservative think tanks immediately became alarmed, with one stating that he would "commit fiscal terrorism". In this position, he continued the legal actions against Aceros de Guatemala, alleging they owed US$100 million in taxes, fees, and interest. The company denied this, and Foppa in response tried to seize control of the company's finances. Aceros ultimately paid the fees, the largest tax fine in Guatemalan history, but has maintained its innocence. He also investigated and extracted US$5.8 million in back taxes, fines, and interest from a company which owned hotels, partially by arresting its owner.

He investigated many similar cases, and by the end of his term extracted US$280 million. However, he later acknowledged his actions were "too aggressive", and detractors stated he "turned administrative cases into criminal cases". He also restructured the agency, removing individuals he alleged were complicit in helping companies perform tax fraud. He tweeted out names of companies he suspected of committing tax fraud, and even insisted his mother catch up with her taxes on Mother's Day. During this time, he was seen as an important member of the anti-corruption wing of the government, along with Attorney General Thelma Aldana and Interior Minister Francisco Rivas Lara. However, he was fired by Morales for missing his goal by 0.3%, which, according to InSight Crime, many thought was a mere pretext to remove him for his anti-corruption fight.

In 2021, the government of Guatemala simultaneously dropped the charges against Pérez Molina and pressed charges against Foppa, allegedly for signature fraud as he began to try to start his own political party. They also charged him with illicit association and conspiracy, both of which were dropped by the case judge. Around this time, he left the country and lived in Washington, D.C., for a period.

In 2022, he became defense counsel for José Rubén Zamora, a media executive who had been arrested under charges of money laundering which both international observers and Zamora viewed as manipulated and as part of an effort to prevent Zamora's reporting. He resigned as defense attorney in March 2023 due to his concerns that he might be charged himself for defending Zamora.

He ran for mayor of Guatemala City in 2023 as the candidate of a coalition led by the Movimiento Semilla. He was polling in second place, but was ultimately unable to complete his campaign as a result of the Supreme Electoral Tribunal revoking his permission: he was arrested for what was alleged to be obstruction of justice stemming from his defense of Zamora. He pled guilty, stating he did not believe he'd receive a fair trial. Charges were ultimately dropped, however.

Foppa was also a volunteer firefighter, and spent thirteen years with the municipal fire brigade.

On 15 October 2026, Foppa alleged that the CIA and the Guatemalan army held an operation which resulted in the deaths of eight people in Huité, department of Zacapa.

== Assassination ==
On 17 October 2026, Foppa was killed by four men in athletic clothing who shot him more than 50 times while he was attending a football match in Guatemala City's Zone 5. He was 43 years old. The Guatemalan government described the incident as an "execution-style" attack. His four security guards were just thirty to forty meters away, protecting his 14-year-old son. Democracy Now! and local journalists characterized the killing as an assassination, and President Bernardo Arévalo called for a full investigation. Another person was also killed and five more injured during the shooting.

Two young men in possession of a firearm were arrested in the immediate aftermath but later released by a judge on the grounds of insufficient evidence linking them to the killings. Subsequently, at least seven policemen were investigated as part of a full review by the Ministry of the Interior. According to U.S. News & World Report, the killing evoked memories of the assassination of Bishop Juan José Gerardi in 1998.

President Arévalo and other senior government officials attended Foppa's wake to pay their respects. His funeral on 20 October 2026 incorporated elements of traditional Mayan ceremonial practices.
