= William W. Popp =

American diplomat

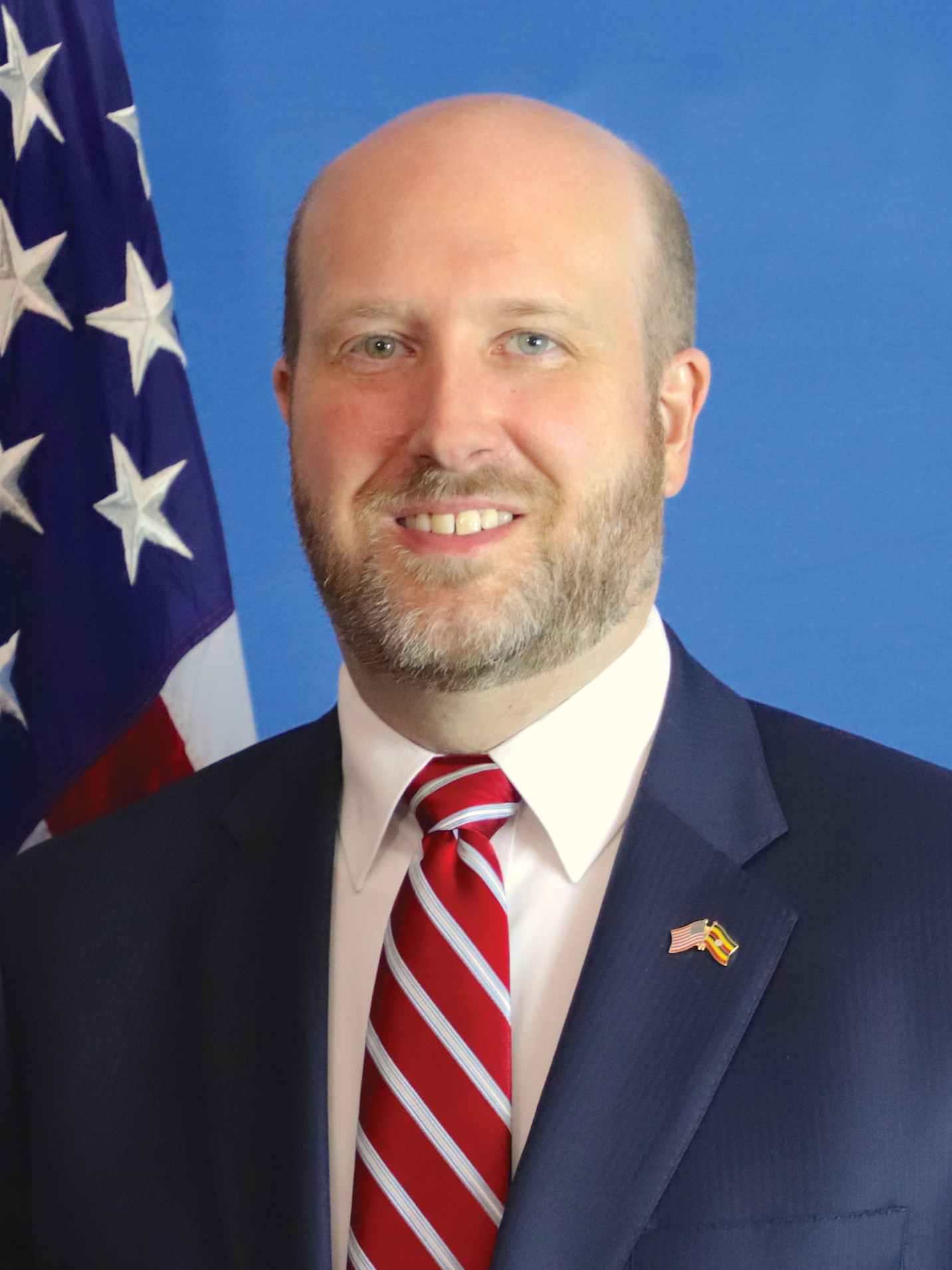

United States Ambassador to Uganda
- In office September 20, 2023 – June 2, 2026
- President: Joe Biden; Donald Trump
- Preceded by: Natalie E. Brown

United States Ambassador to Guatemala
- In office October 19, 2020 – August 24, 2023
- President: Donald Trump; Joe Biden
- Preceded by: Luis E. Arreaga
- Succeeded by: Tobin John Bradley

United States Ambassador to Brazil
- In office November 5, 2018 – March 30, 2020 as Chargé d’Affaires ad interim
- President: Donald Trump
- Preceded by: P. Michael McKinley
- Succeeded by: Todd C. Chapman

Personal details
- Born: William Wayne Popp
- Education: Westminster College (B.A.); George Washington University (M.A.); National War College (M.S.)
- Nickname: Bill

William Wayne Popp is an American diplomat who had served as the United States ambassador to Uganda. He previously served as the United States ambassador to Guatemala.

== Education ==
Popp earned his Bachelor of Arts, magna cum laude, from Westminster College, his Master of Arts from George Washington University, and his Master of Science in National Security Strategy at the National War College.

== Career ==
Popp was the Deputy Principal Officer and then Acting Principal Officer at the United States Consulate General in São Paulo, Brazil. He also served as the Deputy Economic Counselor of the United States Embassy in Bogotá, Colombia. He served as the Political Counselor and then as the Acting Deputy Chief of Mission at the United States Embassy in Nairobi, Kenya. He was also the Director of the Office of Regional Economic Policy and Summit Coordination in the Bureau of Western Hemisphere Affairs at the State Department. He was the Chargé d'Affaires a.i. in Brazil from November 2018 to February 2020. He has been the Deputy Chief of Mission at the U.S. Embassy in Brasilia, Brazil since August 2017.

=== Ambassador to Guatemala ===
On May 28, 2020, President Donald Trump announced his intent to nominate Popp to be the next United States Ambassador to Guatemala. On June 2, 2020, his nomination was sent to the United States Senate. He was confirmed by the U.S. Senate on August 6, 2020 by voice vote. He was sworn into office on August 13, 2020. Popp presented his credentials to Guatemalan President Alejandro Giammattei on October 19, 2020.

=== Ambassador to Uganda ===
On February 27, 2023, President Joe Biden nominated Popp to be the next ambassador to Uganda. Hearings on his nomination were held before the Senate Foreign Relations Committee on May 16, 2023. The committee favorably reported the nomination on June 1, 2023. It was confirmed by the full Senate on July 27, 2023 via voice vote. Popp presented his credentials to President Yoweri Museveni on September 20, 2023.

== Personal life ==
Popp speaks Spanish and Portuguese.

== See also ==
- List of ambassadors of the United States

Diplomatic posts
Preceded by Luis E. Arreaga	United States Ambassador to Guatemala; 2020–2023	Succeeded by Patrick Ventrell (acting)
Preceded by Natalie E. Brown	United States Ambassador to Uganda; 2023–2026	Vacant
