= 2023 Guatemala City mayoral election =

- 25 June 2023
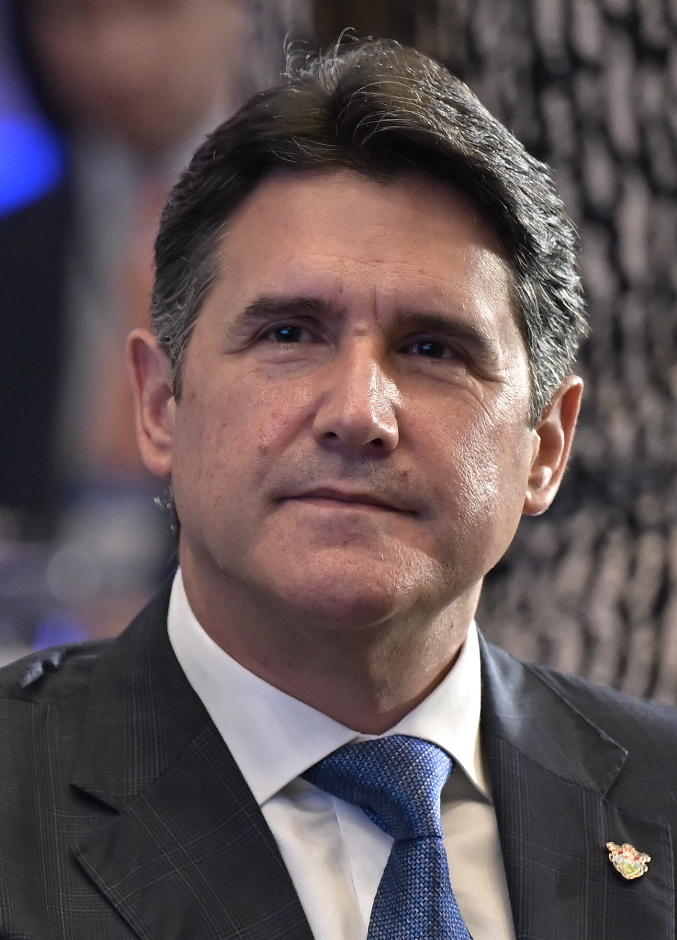

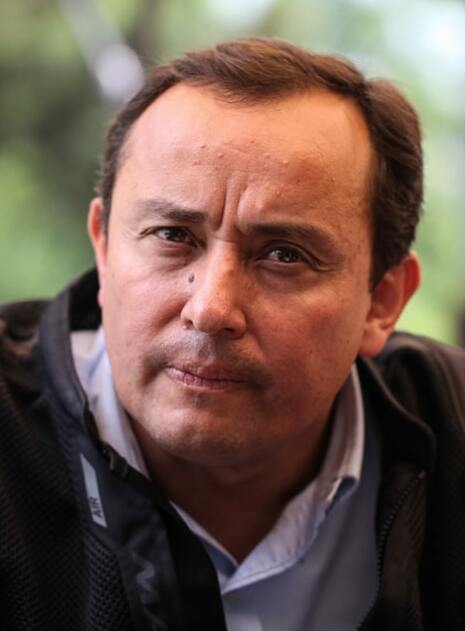

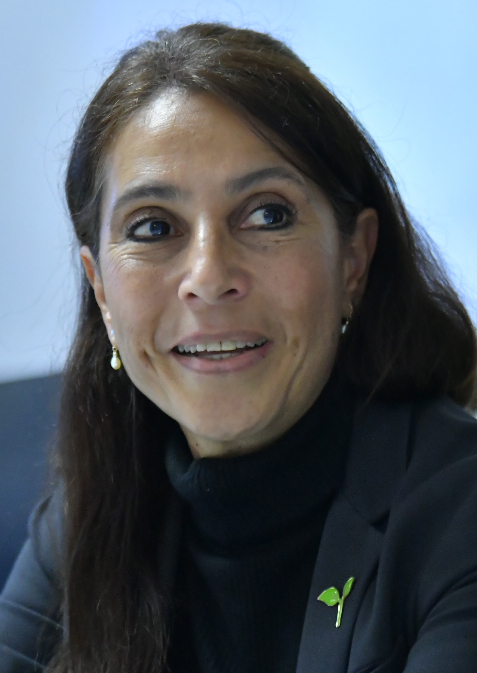
Candidate	Ricardo Quiñónez	Roberto González	Ninotchka Matute
Party	Unionist	CREO	Semilla
Alliance	Valor		URNG–Winaq
Popular vote	106,604	106,181	77,880
Percentage	24.59%	24.49%	17.96%
Mayor before election
Ricardo Quiñónez
Unionist Party
Elected Mayor
Ricardo Quiñónez
Unionist Party

The 2023 Guatemala City mayoral election was held on 25 June 2023, to elect the mayor of Guatemala City, Department of Guatemala and thirteen members of the Municipal Council. Incumbent Ricardo Quiñónez Lemus was eligible for another term. Quiñónez of the Unionist Party ran for re-election with the support of Valor.

Juan Francisco Solórzano Foppa, a pre-candidate of the Semilla–Winaq–URNG–MAIZ coalition, was unable to register due to legal issues, but his team was registered. Under electoral law, if the coalition wins the election, the first councilor would have become the mayor-elect, but she withdrew her candidacy, which led to Ninotchka Matute, the second councilor, becoming the mayor-elect.

== Council composition ==
The table below shows the composition of the political groups in the Municipal Council at the present time.

Current Municipal Council composition
Parties
Parties	Seats
Unionist Party	8
Commitment, Renewal and Order	4
Movimiento Semilla	1

== Candidates ==
=== Major candidates ===
Party	Candidate	Date declared
Unionist Valor	Ricardo Quiñónez; Mayor of Guatemala City (2018–present); First Councillor of Guatemala City (2008–2018)	9 December 2022
Semilla Winaq URNG	Ninotchka Matute	14 January 2023
CREO	Roberto González; Minister of Energy and Mines (2004–2005); Fifth Councillor of Guatemala City (2004–2007)	26 February 2023

=== Other candidates ===
Party	Candidate	Date declared
Todos	Carlos Sandoval; Vice Minister of Sports and Recreation (2020)	6 November 2022
Blue; Party	Jean Paul Briere; Member of the Congress (2012–2020)	11 December 2022
UNE	Antonio Coro; Mayor of Santa Catarina Pinula (2000–2015)	18 December 2022
Republican; Party	Geovany Noriega Salazar	14 January 2023
Vamos	Mario Méndez Montenegro; Minister of Agriculture, Livestock and Food (2016–2020)	29 January 2023
Podemos	Sebastián "Tian" Arzú	29 January 2023
Victory	Ofelia Rodríguez	5 February 2023
BIEN	Carlos Cerezo Blandón	12 February 2023
PPN	Luis Garistú	17 February 2023
PAN	Juan Carlos Eggenberger	18 February 2023
Change	Marlon "Pirulo" Puente	19 February 2023
FCN	Mario Rodríguez	12 March 2023

== Opinion polls ==
Polling firm	Fieldwork date	Sample size	S. Arzú Podemos	Coro UNE	Foppa / Matute Semilla–Winaq–URNG	González CREO	Méndez Vamos	Puente Change	Quiñónez Unionist–Valor	Sandoval Todos	Others	No one
C&E Research	9 May 2023	1.000	7.0%	5.0%	5.0%	21.0%	2.0%	2.0%	22.0%	1.0%	5.0%	30.0%
C&E Research	9 May 2023	1.000	—N/a	—N/a	—N/a	37.0%	—N/a	—N/a	25.0%	—N/a	—N/a	38.0%
Consultora Demoscopia, S.A.	19–21 Apr 2023	713	—N/a	6.2%	—N/a	20.6%	—N/a	—N/a	43.2%	1.8%	7.0%	20.3%
Consultora Demoscopia, S.A.	19–21 Apr 2023	713	—N/a	—N/a	—N/a	21.2%	—N/a	—N/a	41.1%	1.5%	14.1%	22.1%
Demoscopia Digital	15–16 Apr 2023	800	5.0%	13.2%	—N/a	7.4%	3.6%	5.9%	32.7%	3.8%	7.8%	20.6%
Massive Caller	Apr 2023	600	3.4%	4.7%	13.0%	12.3%	3.0%	5.4%	31.0%	3.2%	24.0%	—N/a
Polianalítica	17–18 Mar 2023	700	1.5%	9.2%	12.7%	7.6%	4.5%	3.6%	29.6%	2.6%	12.8%	15.9%
Demoscopia Digital	12 Feb 2023	—N/a	2.9%	9.5%	11.8%	4.8%	4.7%	2.6%	27.1%	2.0%	6.2%	28.2%
Massive Caller	6 Feb 2023	600	—N/a	7.1%	13.8%	6.1%	3.9%	—N/a	25.4%	3.2%	6.7%	33.8%
C&E Research	28 Sep 2022	600	—N/a	—N/a	—N/a	33.0%	—N/a	—N/a	39.0%	6.0%	22.0%	—N/a

== Results ==
Candidate	Party	Votes	%
Ricardo Quiñónez	Valor–Unionist	106,604	24.59
Roberto González	Commitment, Renewal and Order	106,181	24.49
Ninotchka Matute	Semilla–Winaq–URNG–MAIZ	77,880	17.96
Antonio Coro	National Unity of Hope	32,312	7.45
Sebastián Arzú	Podemos	18,413	4.25
Carlos Sandoval	Todos	16,388	3.78
Jean Paul Briere	Blue Party	11,807	2.72
Mario Méndez	Vamos	9,236	2.13
Roberto Peralta	Vision with Values	8,064	1.86
Ofelia Rodríguez	Victory	7,933	1.83
Marlon Puente	Change	6,122	1.41
Carlos Cerezo	Bienestar Nacional	5,566	1.28
Erasmo Coronado	Cabal	4,851	1.12
Alfonso García	Nosotros	4,375	1.01
Juan C. Eggenberger	National Advancement Party	3,452	0.80
Vinicio Guerra	My Family	2,283	0.53
Gilder Guzmán	Movement for the Liberation of Peoples	2,056	0.47
Armando Soto	Republican Union	1,737	0.40
Alberto Valladares	Opportunities and Development Party	1,561	0.36
Mario Rodríguez	National Convergence Front	1,520	0.35
Luis Fernando Morán	National Integration Party	1,381	0.32
Noé Solares	Humanist Party of Guatemala	1,363	0.31
Geovany Noriega	Republican Party	1,317	0.30
Julio Dougherty	Independent	1,110	0.26
Total		433,512	100.00
Source: TSE
