= Interpeace =

Peace-building organization

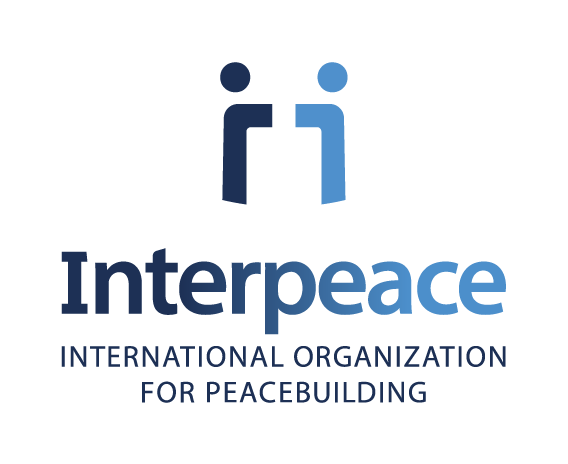
- Formation: 1994
- Type: INGO
- Purpose: Peacebuilding
- Headquarters: Geneva, Switzerland
- Location: Geneva, Switzerland
- Website: interpeace.org

Interpeace is an international peacebuilding organization which advances sustainable peace in two mutually reinforcing ways: (1) strengthening the capacities of societies to manage conflict themselves in non-violent and non-coercive ways; and (2) assisting the international community, particularly the United Nations, to be more effective in supporting peacebuilding. Interpeace tailors its practical approach and peacebuilding policies to each society and ensures that the work is locally owned and driven. Together with in-country partners and teams, Interpeace develops peacebuilding programmes and helps establish processes of change that connect local communities, civil society, government, and the international community. The organisation has worked in more than 20 countries in Africa, the Middle East, Europe, Asia, and Latin America.

In 2017, Interpeace was granted 'international organisation' status by Switzerland's Federal Council of Ministers.

As a strategic partner of the United Nations, with a representative of the United Nations Secretary General on its Governing Board, Interpeace is headquartered in Geneva, Switzerland, and has worldwide offices supporting its in-country peacebuilding and policy advocacy work.

Interpeace has incubated a number of initiatives that later became stand-alone organisations, including the Principles for Peace Foundation, led by Yves Daccord and Hiba Qasas.

== History ==
The origins of Interpeace date back to 1994, when the United Nations conducted a peacebuilding pilot project called the 'War-torn Societies' project. The project became an independent non-profit organization in 2000, now named Interpeace.
