= Natalie E. Brown =

American diplomat

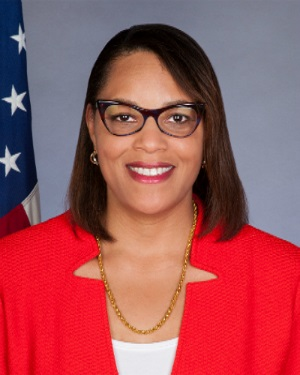

United States Ambassador to Uganda
- In office November 17, 2020 – August 30, 2023
- President: Donald Trump; Joe Biden
- Preceded by: Deborah R. Malac
- Succeeded by: William W. Popp

United States Ambassador to Eritrea
- In office September 23, 2016 – November 25, 2019
- President: Barack Obama; Donald Trump
- Preceded by: Louis Mazel
- Succeeded by: Steven C. Walker

Personal details
- Education: Georgetown University (B.S.); U.S. Marine Corps Command and Staff College (M.S.)
- Occupation: Diplomat

Natalie E. Brown is a career member of the Senior Foreign Service, class of Minister Counselor. In 2019, she was nominated to be the Ambassador to Uganda, and her nomination was confirmed on August 6, 2020. She arrived in Uganda the weekend of October 31, 2020 and presented her credentials on November 17, 2020. She previously served as the Chief of Mission and Chargé d'Affaires of the U.S. Embassy in Asmara, Eritrea from September 2016 to November 2019.

Brown earned a Bachelor of Science from the Georgetown University School of Foreign Service in 1988 and was awarded her Master of Science from the U.S. Marine Corps Command and Staff College in 1999.

== Personal life ==
Brown speaks French and Arabic, and has studied Italian, German, Amharic, and Tigrinya.

== See also ==
- List of current ambassadors of the United States
