= Tobin John Bradley =

American diplomat

Tobin John Bradley OCR
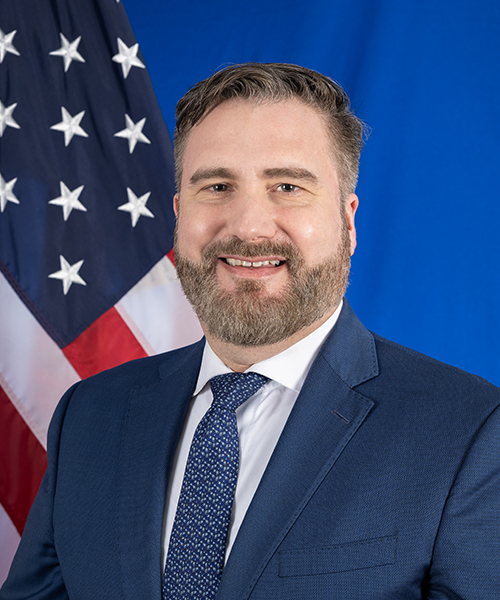

United States Ambassador to Guatemala
- In office February 12, 2024 – January 17, 2026
- President: Joe Biden
- Preceded by: William W. Popp

Personal details
- Education: Georgetown University (BS); Princeton University (MA)

Tobin John Bradley is an American diplomat who served as United States ambassador to Guatemala from 2024 to 2026.

== Early life and education ==
Bradley was born and raised in the San Francisco Bay Area. He received a Bachelor of Science from the Walsh School of Foreign Service at Georgetown University and a Master of Arts from the Princeton School of Public and International Affairs.

Georgetown's School of Foreign Service lists him as a notable alumnus, class of 1996.

== Career ==
Bradley is a career member of the Senior Foreign Service with the rank of Minister-Counselor. Before joining the Foreign Service, he studied in Cameroon. He also worked at the World Bank in Washington, D.C.

Bradley served as the INL Director in Mexico City and consul general in Matamoros, Mexico. He has also served as director for NATO and Western European affairs at the National Security Council, political counselor at the U.S. Embassy in London, special assistant for Near Eastern and South Asian affairs to the Under Secretary of State for Political Affairs, as well as at the U.S. Missions in Amman, USNATO, and the United States Department of State Operations Center. He also served as the political advisor for the Dhi Qar Governorate in Nasiriyah, Iraq and earned the National Service to America Medal for International Affairs for his work organizing local democratic elections. He served as the Deputy Assistant Secretary of State in the Bureau of International Narcotics and Law Enforcement Affairs (INL) from 2020 to 2024.

On April 20, 2023, President Joe Biden announced his intent to nominate Bradley to serve as the next United States ambassador to Guatemala. On April 25, 2023, his nomination was sent to the Senate. On July 26, 2023, a hearing on his nomination was held before the Senate Foreign Relations Committee. On September 20, 2023, his nomination was reported out of committee. On December 20, 2023, his nomination was confirmed in the Senate by voice vote. His first day in country as Ambassador in Guatemala was on February 2, 2024. Bradley presented his credentials to President Bernardo Arévalo on February 12, 2024.

== Personal life ==
Bradley speaks Arabic, French, and Spanish.

== See also ==
- Ambassadors of the United States

Diplomatic posts
Preceded by William W. Popp	United States Ambassador to Guatemala; Appointed January 2024	Ambassador
