= Ministry of Communications, Infrastructure and Housing =

Government ministry of Guatemala

Ministry of Communications, Infrastructure, and Housing
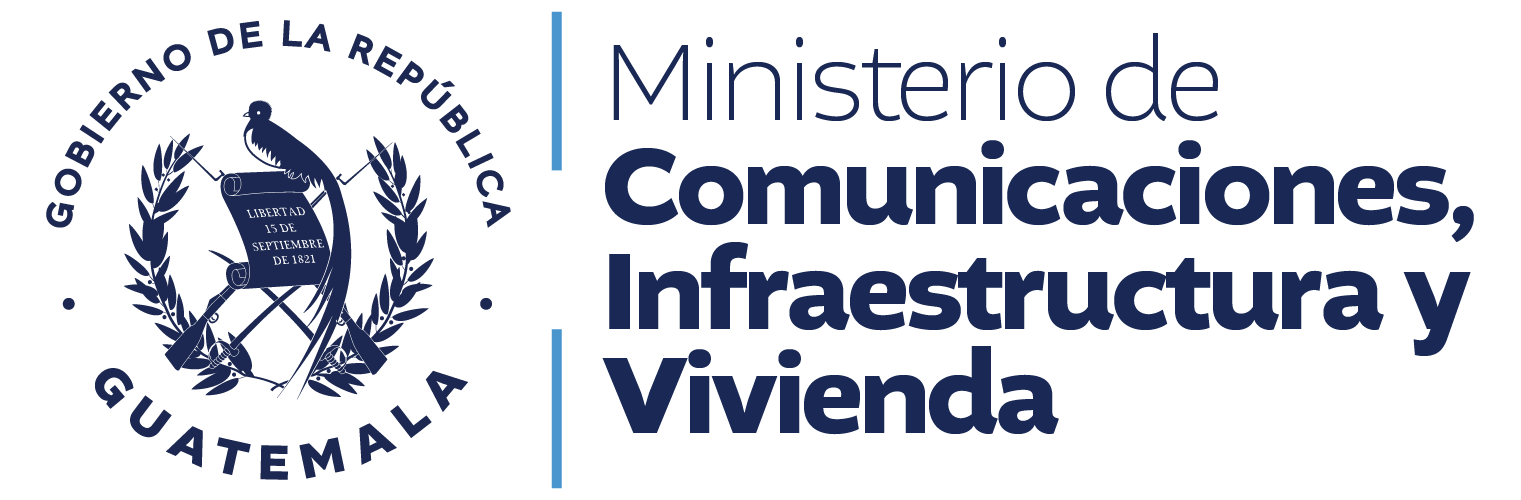
- Ministry logo

Ministry overview
- Formed: August 24, 1871; 154 years ago
- Jurisdiction: Guatemala
- Headquarters: 8th Avenue and 15th Street, Zone 13, Guatemala
- Ministry executive: Norma Zea, Minister
- Website: civ.gob.gt

The Ministry of Communications, Infrastructure, and Housing (Spanish: Ministerio de Comunicaciones, Infraestructura y Vivienda or CIV) is a government ministry of Guatemala, headquartered in Zone 13 of Guatemala City. The current minister is Félix Alvarado.

== List of ministers ==
| Minister | President | Cabinet | Term start | Term end |
|---|---|---|---|---|
| Alejandro Sinibaldi | Otto Pérez Molina | Molina Cabinet | 14 January 2012 | 12 September 2014 |
| Víctor Corado Váldez | Otto Pérez Molina | Molina Cabinet | 12 September 2014 | 3 September 2015 |
| Víctor Corado Váldez | Alejandro Maldonado | Maldonado Cabinet | 3 September 2015 | 14 January 2016 |
| Sherry Ordóñez Castro | Jimmy Morales | Morales Cabinet | 14 January 2016 | 25 January 2016 |
| José Luis Benito Ruiz | Jimmy Morales | Morales Cabinet | 25 January 2016 | 2 February 2016 |
| Aldo García Morales | Jimmy Morales | Morales Cabinet | 2 February 2016 | 13 April 2018 |
| José Luis Benito Ruiz | Jimmy Morales | Morales Cabinet | 13 April 2018 | 14 January 2020 |
| José Lemus Cifuentes | Alejandro Giammattei | Giammattei Cabinet | 14 January 2020 | 29 June 2021 |
| Javier Maldonado Quiñónez | Alejandro Giammattei | Giammattei Cabinet | 1 July 2021 | 14 January 2024 |
| Jazmín de la Vega | Bernardo Arévalo | Arévalo Cabinet | 15 January 2024 | 17 May 2024 |
| Félix Alvarado | Bernardo Arévalo | Arévalo Cabinet | 20 May 2024 | 15 November 2024 |
| Paola Constatino | Bernardo Arévalo | Arévalo Cabinet | 15 November 2024 | 13 January 2025 |
| Miguel Ángel Díaz Bobadilla | Bernardo Arévalo | Arévalo Cabinet | 13 January 2025 | Incumbent |
