= Roberto González Díaz-Durán =

Guatemalan economist and politician

Roberto González
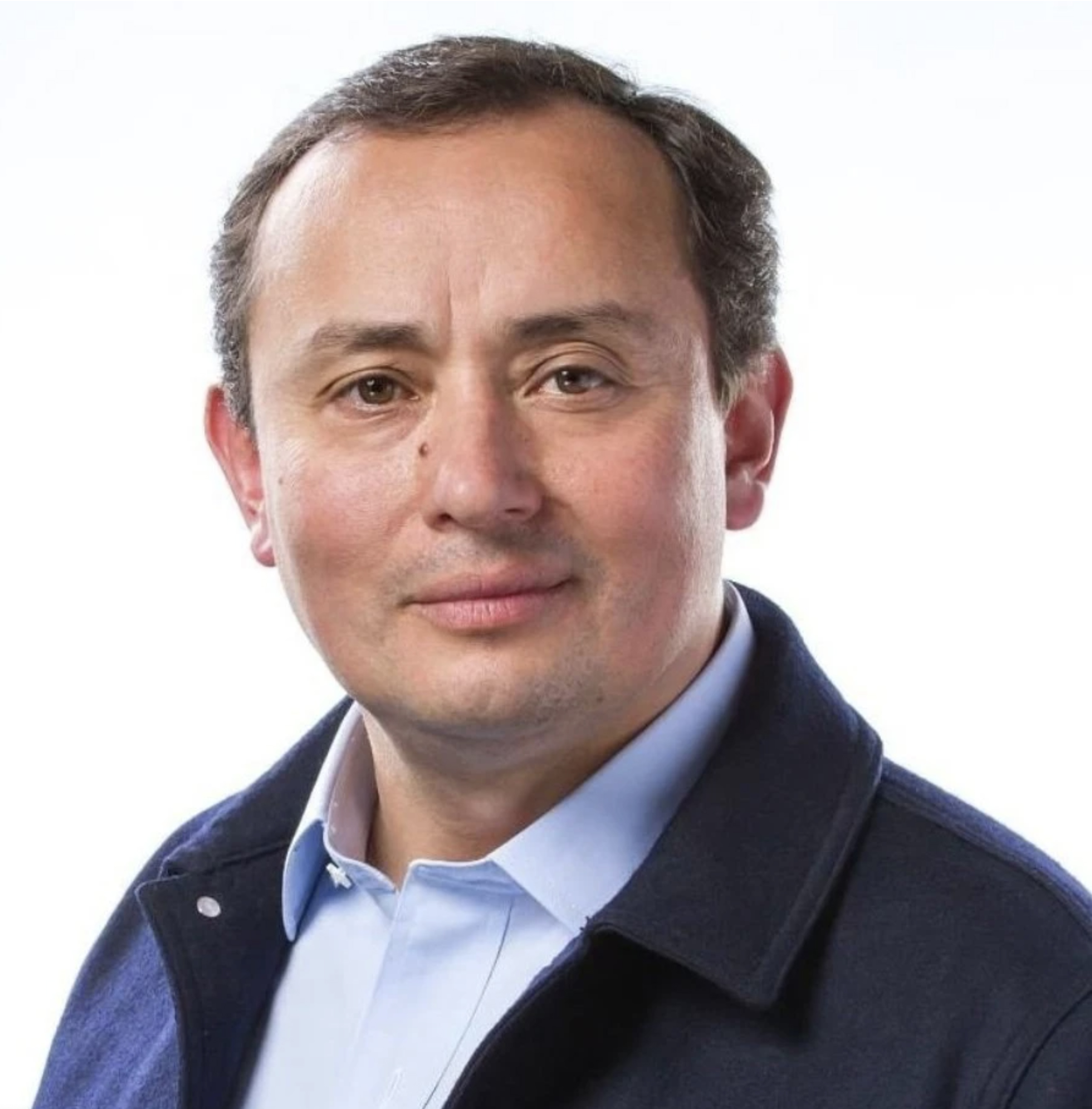

Minister of Energy and Mines
- In office 14 January 2004 – 14 January 2005
- President: Óscar Berger
- Preceded by: Raúl Archila Serrano
- Succeeded by: Luis Romeo Ortíz Peláez

Fifth Councillor of Guatemala City
- In office 15 January 2004 – 2007
- Mayor: Álvaro Arzú
- Preceded by: Diego Arzú
- Succeeded by: Clara Luz Méndez Mere

Personal details
- Born: 15 November 1970 (age 55) Guatemala City, Guatemala
- Party: Commitment, Renewal and Order
- Other political affiliations: Grand National Alliance
- Education: Universidad Francisco Marroquín

Roberto González Díaz-Durán (born 15 November 1970) is a Guatemalan economist and politician who served as Minister of Energy and Mines from 2004 to 2005. González has been an unsuccessful candidate for mayor of Guatemala City in 2007, 2011, 2019 and 2023, he came in second place in all elections.

González was also presidential candidate in 2015 for the CREO–Unionist coalition, after forming a temporary coalition with his political rival, mayor Álvaro Arzú.
