= Metro Riel =

Proposed light rail line in Guatemala City

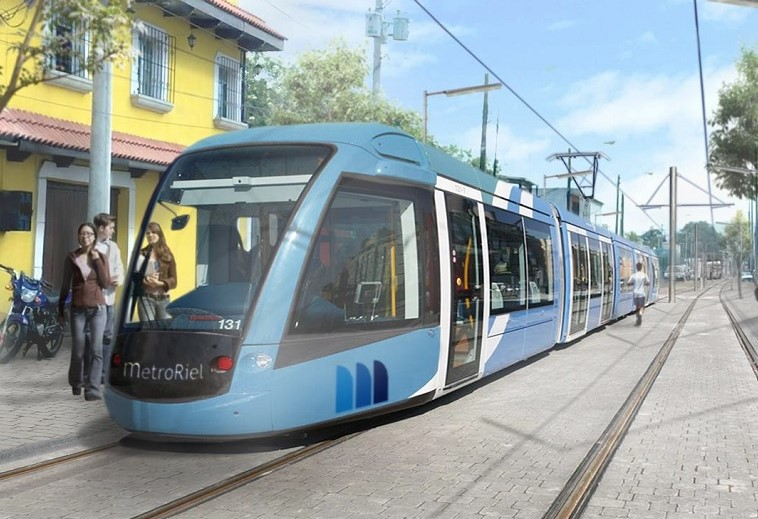
- Illustration showing what a light rail car on the proposed MetroRiel system might look like

Overview
- Locale: Guatemala City, Guatemala
- Transit type: Light rail
- Number of lines: 1
- Number of stations: 20
- Daily ridership: 250,000 (projected)

Technical
- System length: 21 km (13.0 mi)
- Track gauge: 1,435 mm (4 ft 8 1/2 in) standard gauge

Metro Riel is a light rail line proposed for Guatemala's capital, Guatemala City.

== Background ==
In October 2016, it was reported that Spanish consulting engineer IDOM conducted a feasibility study into a 20-kilometre (12 mi) light rail system for Guatemala City, evaluating the cost at $770 million. Journeys between the two termini of the line would take around 40 minutes at a commercial speed of 30 km/h (19 mph) on a largely segregated alignment. The project was then shelved, but revisited in 2018.

In April 2019, the Guatemalan national competition agency Pronacom and public private partnership promotion agency Anadie began seeking a consultant for an advanced design study for Metro Riel.

== Construction ==
In 2019, the municipality of Guatemala City signed an agreement with the country's railway infrastructure manager Ferrovías to use an abandoned heavy rail alignment for the project.

Preliminary construction works began in 2024, with a targeted opening of the first phase in mid-2027.

The Metro uses part of the alignment of the former heavy rail line.
