= Yves Daccord =

Humanitarian leader

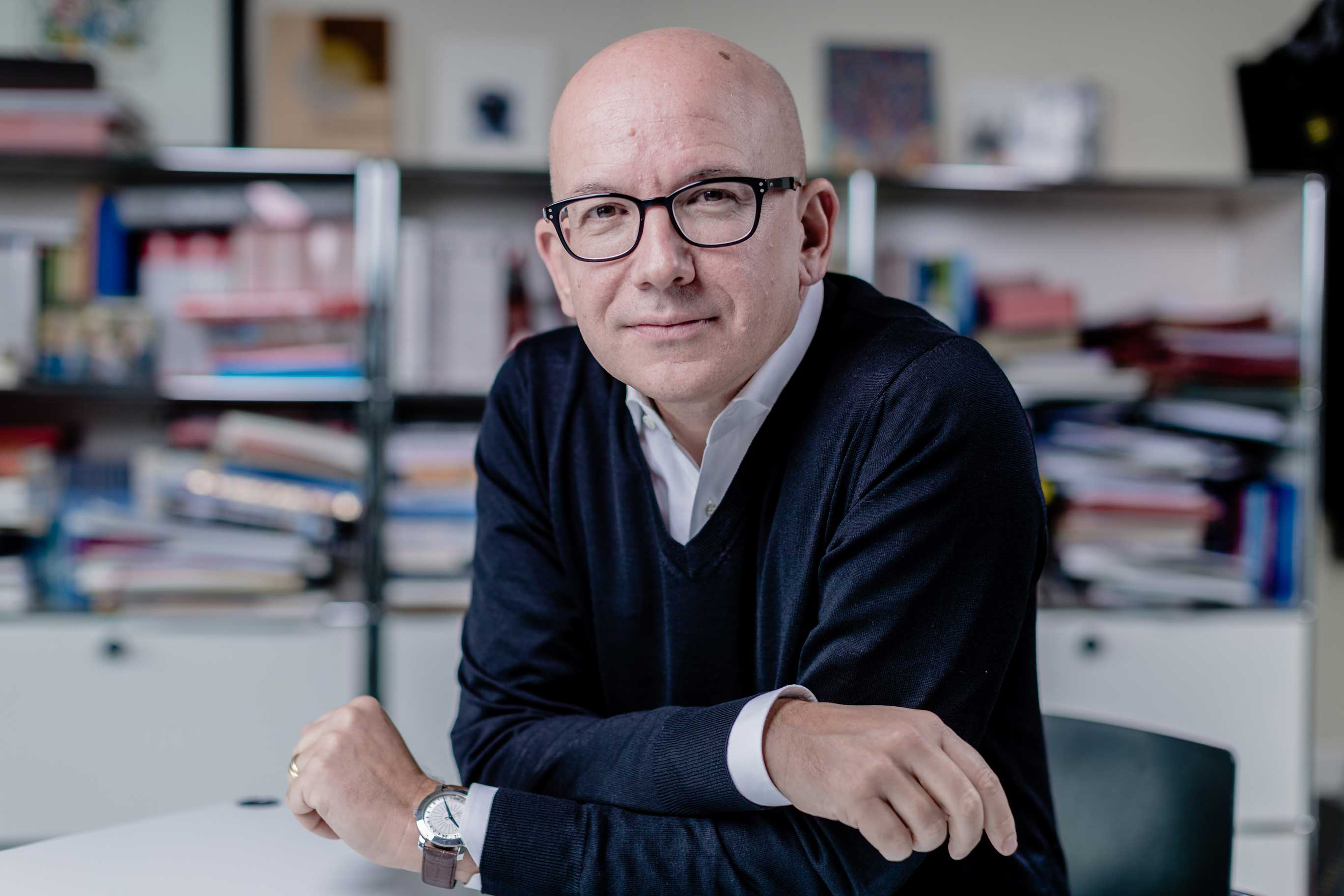
- Born: 1964 (age 61–62); Zürich, Switzerland
- Occupation: Ex-Director General of the International Committee of the Red Cross (2010-2020)

Yves Daccord (born 1964), is a humanitarian leader, international strategist, influencer and changemaker. From 2010 – March 2020, Yves was Director-General of the International Committee of the Red Cross (ICRC), a global humanitarian organization employing 20,000 staff. A former journalist, TV producer and international relations expert, his ICRC career spanned more than two decades in a variety of posts and challenging contexts – including Israel and the Occupied Territories, Sudan, Yemen, Chechnya and Georgia. Daccord currently leads the Edgelands Institute, Harvard University’s first-ever Pop-Up Institute. He also leads the #Principles4Peace initiative to reshape peace processes around the world and chairs the Board of the International Human Rights Film Festival of Geneva.

Yves was a member of the Board of Trustees of ODI, a leading global affairs think tank working to inspire people to act on injustice and inequality and of the Board of Trial International working towards fighting impunity for international crimes and supporting victims in their quest for justice.

Since 2022, he also chairs the Board of Our Common Home, a network that promotes civic participation of everyone in society to build solutions to our changing natural environment. Our Common Home works in Germany, Poland, Brazil, India, Mexico, France, Spain, Lithuania, Estonia, Latvia, Kenya, South Africa, Switzerland and South Korea.

Yves Daccord is part of the international jury of the Media Forward Fund. He finished his mandate as Chairman of the leading Swiss newspaper Le Temps.

Yves holds a degree in political science and an honorary doctorate in social sciences from the University of St. Gallen, awarded in 2017.

== Early life and education ==
Yves Daccord was born in Zürich, Switzerland. He attended the Collège Saint-Michel in Fribourg before pursuing his studies at the University of Geneva, where he graduated with a Bachelor of Arts in political science and international relations in 1986. He subsequently pursued postgraduate training as a broadcast journalist, and began working at Radio Télévision Suisse in Geneva in 1987.

== Professional career at the ICRC ==
Daccord joined the ICRC in 1992, running humanitarian operations in various challenging contexts of armed conflict including Israel and the Occupied Territories, Sudan, Yemen, Chechnya and Georgia. He held a number of progressively senior positions within the organisation, including Head of Communication Division (1998-2002) and Director of Communications (2002-2010) before his appointment as Director-General in 2010.

As Director-General, Daccord has overseen a period of transformative change within the ICRC in response to ever-increasing humanitarian needs in armed conflicts and other situations of violence around the world. As the organisation has seen significant growth in its operations in recent years, employing some 16,000 people in more than 80 countries (as of 2017), Daccord has spearheaded significant institutional reforms in areas such as human resources and people management; partnerships and stakeholder management; and innovation and technology . He has spoken and published widely on key issues such as violence against health care; the risks and opportunities of new technologies in the humanitarian sector; global humanitarian affairs; and the future of humanitarian action.

== The Edgelands Institute ==
In 2020, Yves Daccord founded the Edgelands Institute, Harvard University's first-ever pop-up research institute. The institute was founded in partnership with Dr. Beatriz Arcila Botero and Danil Kerimi, and incubated at the Berkman Klein Center for Internet and Society at Harvard University.

The institute's methodology consists of "popping-up" in different cities around the world to understand the use of digital security technologies, capture local power dynamics, and host diverse spaces of conversation. The institute has so far has been present in five different cities, Medellín, Geneva, Cúcuta, Nairobi, and Houston. The institute has many institutional partnerships including with Magnum Photography, the Berkman Klein Center for Internet and Society at Harvard University, Casa de las Estratégias, among others.

== Our common home ==
In 2022, Yves Daccord became the Chair of Our Common Home, a networked organization which aims to empower people to build the common good for the environment. The philosophy of our common home consists in promoting civic participation of everyone in society, with a focus on people holding more traditional values and feel attached to their place and traditions. Our Common Home supports the creation of civic associations around the world to carry its mission locally and engage a wider part of the population in the debates around environmental protection.

== Honours ==
In 2014, Daccord was appointed to the chair of the Steering Committee for Humanitarian Response (SCHR), a voluntary alliance of nine of the world's leading humanitarian organisations. In 2015, World Health Organization (WHO) Director-General Margaret Chan appointed Daccord as a member of the Advisory Group on Reform of WHO's Work in Outbreaks and Emergencies with Health and Humanitarian Consequences. In May 2017, he was awarded an Honorary Doctor's degree in Social Sciences by the University of St. Gallen, in recognition of his "outstanding services to the fortunes of the ICRC".

== Personal life ==
Daccord is father of three daughters. He lives in Switzerland.
