= Bernardo Caal Xol =

Guatemalan human rights activist

- Born: 1972 (age 52–53); Santa María Cahabón, Alta Verapaz, Guatemala
- Occupation: Activist

Bernardo Caal Xol (born in 1972) is a Guatemalan human rights activist and former teacher who has drawn the attention of Amnesty International.

== Life and activism ==
Caal was a school teacher, but became one of the leaders of the movement to defend water resources of his community; he denounced alleged irregularities in the operation of mining companies in his native Alta Verapaz.

In 2017, Caal was imprisoned for an alleged crime of theft of construction equipment and the illegal retention of four workers from a construction company. He was sentenced in 2018 to 7 years in prison. In 2020, Amnesty International declared him a "prisoner of conscience", considering that the charges against him were retaliation for his activism.

In March 2022, Caal was released on good behavior.

== See also ==
- Human rights in Guatemala
