= Ninotchka Matute =

Guatemalan architect and politician (born 1967)

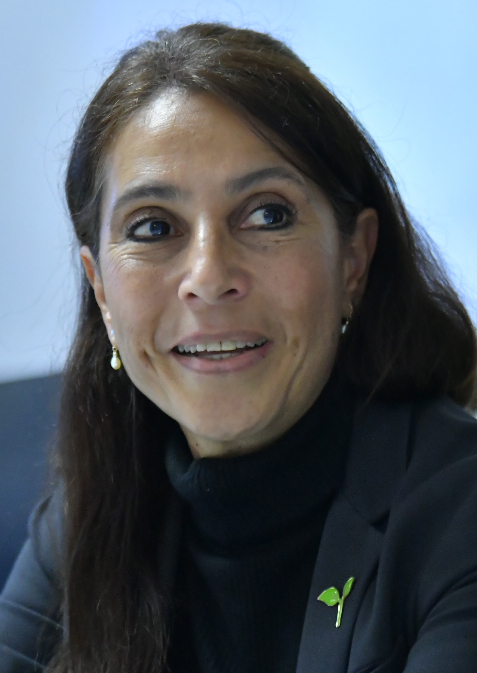
- Matute in 2023.

8th Councillor of Guatemala City
- Incumbent
- Assumed office 15 January 2024
- Preceded by: José Pablo Mendoza Franco

Personal details
- Born: 1967 (age 58–59) Guatemala City
- Party: Roots
- Other political affiliations: Semilla
- Children: 3
- Education: University of Chile; Rafael Landívar University

Ana Silvia Ninotchka Matute Rodríguez (born in 1967), also known as Nino Matute, is a Guatemalan architect, urban planner and politician. A member of Semilla party, she is councillor of Guatemala City since 2024, having been elected in 2023 mayoral election.

In 2023 mayoral election, Matute was nominated as a candidate for 2nd councilor for Semilla–Winaq–URNG–MAIZ coalition. After the presumptive candidate for mayor Juan Francisco Solórzano Foppa was not registered due to legal problems and candidate for 1st councilor resigned, Matute was responsible for leading the coalition but maintaining her candidacy for 2nd councilor. (Note: Matute became de facto candidate for mayor of Guatemala City.) According to the Electoral Law, if the coalition had won the elections, Matute would have taken office as mayor of Guatemala City. Surprisingly, the coalition led by Matute obtained 18% of votes and third place. Although the coalition did not win, Matute was elected as councilor and she will take office in January 2024.
