= Mayorga =

Mayorga can refer to:

== Places ==
- Mayorga, Spain, a Spanish town
- Mayorga, Leyte, a municipality in the Philippines
- Mayorga de Liberia, a district in Costa Rica
- Puente Mayorga, a village and district of the municipality of San Roque, province of Cádiz, Andalusia, Spain
- Saelices de Mayorga, a municipality in the province of Valladolid, Castile and León, Spain

== People ==
- Benjamín Mayorga Mora (born 1966), a Costa Rican soccer player
- Dionisio Gutierrez Mayorga (born 1959), a Guatemalan businessman
- Enrique Mayorga Rivas (1926-1987), a Salvadoran politician
- Francisco Mayorga (born 1949), a Nicaraguan economist and writer
- Francisco Javier Mayorga Castañeda (born 1951), a Mexican businessman and politician
- Juan Mayorga (born 1965), Spanish dramatist
- Juan José Gutiérrez Mayorga (born 1958), Guatemalan businessman
- Lincoln Mayorga (born 1937), an American pianist, arranger, conductor and composer
- Lupe Mayorga, a Mexican filmmaker
- Martín de Mayorga (1721 – 1783), a Spanish military officer and governor
- Milena Mayorga, Salvadoran politician
- Miriam Mayorga (born 1989), Argentine footballer
- Nuvia Mayorga Delgado, Mexican politician
- Patricia Mayorga, Chilean journalist
- Pedro Mayorga (1921–2014), Argentine equestrian
- Román Mayorga Quirós, Salvadoran politician
- Román Mayorga Rivas (1862–1925), Nicaraguan journalist and poet
- Ricardo Mayorga, Nicaraguan boxer
- Roger Mayorga (born 1946), a retired Nicaraguan footballer
- Ronald Mayorga (born 1984), Colombian journalist
- Roy Mayorga, drummer of American heavy metal band Stone Sour
- Salomón Ibarra Mayorga (1887 – 1985), a Nicaraguan poet and political thinker
- Víctor Mayorga, a Peruvian politician
