= Felipe Bosch Gutiérrez =

Guatemalan businessman

- Born: Felipe Antonio Bosch Gutiérrez; 1962 (age 63–64); Guatemala City, Guatemala
- Occupation: Businessman
- Parent(s): Alfonso Bosch; Isabel Gutiérrez de Bosch
- Relatives: Juan Bautista Gutiérrez (grandfather); Juan Luis Bosch Gutiérrez (brother); Juan José Gutiérrez Mayorga (cousin); Dionisio Gutiérrez Mayorga (cousin)
- Website: https://felipebosch.com/

Felipe Antonio Bosch Gutiérrez (born 1962) is a Guatemalan businessman. From 2004 to 2024, he served as Director of CMI’s Board of Directors. In September 2024, he was appointed Chairman of the CMI Capital Business Group, and in May 2026, he became President of the Juan Bautista Gutiérrez Foundation, the social arm of CMI.

Graduated with a Bachelor's degree in Business Administration from Dallas Baptist University and a Master's degree in International Business from the University of Dallas.

He is listed as a past president of the Committee of Agriculture, Commerce, Industry and Finance Association on their website, and is listed as a past president of the Industry Chamber (Cámara de Industria de Guatemala) on the latter's website. According to the Guatemalan newspaper Diario La Hora, Bosch is one of the original directory members who created “Plan Visión de País,” which is an inter-institutional initiative effort to create a long term development plan for the country.

Bosch was a regular columnist in Siglo Veintiuno, one of the leading newspapers in Guatemala. He and his companies have also spearheaded various public policy campaigns. Bosch has organized important relief efforts for poor families and orphans in Guatemala, some of which have been reported by Diario La Hora. He is also a member of the President's Leadership Council for the Inter-American Dialogue.

== Path ==
In May 2026, Felipe Bosch Gutíerrez assumed the Presidency of the Juan Bautista Gutiérrez Foundation, CMI’s social arm, after previously serving as Vice Presicent and board member of the organization, in which he perpetuated 4 programs: University Scholarships, My Health, My Responsibility, Nutrition, and Entrepreneurship. Likewise, he was President of the Foundation for the Development of Guatemala “FUNDESA” and also of the National Meeting of Entrepreneurs “ENADE”.
