= Siglo XXI =

Siglo XXI (Spanish for 21st century) may refer to:

== Media ==
- Diario Siglo XXI, a newspaper from the Valencian Community
- Siglo Veintiuno, a Guatemalan newspaper
- Siglo XXI, former name of the Argentine newspaper El Siglo, published in Tucumán
- Siglo XXI (publisher), a Spanish-language book publisher with business presences in Spain, Argentina, and Mexico

== Other uses ==
- Auditorio Siglo XXI, in Puebla, Mexico
- Siglo XXI Convention Centre, in Mérida, Yucatán, Mexico
- Siglo XXI (Madrid Metro), a station on Line ML-3

== See also ==
- 21st century (disambiguation)
