= Epoca =

Epoca may refer to:

== Media ==
- Epoca (Italian magazine), 1950–1997
- Epoca (Romanian newspaper), 1885–1938 (with interruptions)
- Época (Brazilian magazine), established in 1998
- Época (Spanish magazine), 1985–2013
- La Epoca (Guatemalan newspaper), 1988
- La Epoca (Ladino Ottoman newspaper), 1875–1912

== Others ==
- EPOCA, acronym of Exèrcit Popular Català, Catalan separatist paramilitary group
- European Project on Ocean Acidification
