= El Siglo =

El Siglo (The Century) may refer to:

== Newspapers ==
- El Siglo de Torreón (Mexico)
- El Siglo (Argentina)
- El Siglo (Chile)
- El Siglo (Guatemala)
- El Siglo (Panama)
- El Siglo (Venezuela)
- El Nuevo Siglo, a Colombian newspaper formerly titled El Siglo

== Products ==
- Siglo (cigar brand), a brand of premium cigars created by Frank Llaneza for cigar giant Altadis
- Siglo (cryptocurrency), a cryptocurrency focusing on mobile network access and monetization
