= Isabel Gutiérrez de Bosch =

Guatemalan businesswoman and philanthropist (1931–2020)

- Gutiérrez de Bosch at a 2019 event
- Born: Isabel Gutiérrez Gutiérrez; 23 July 1931; San Cristóbal Totonicapán, Guatemala
- Died: 6 September 2020 (aged 89); Guatemala City, Guatemala
- Occupations: Philanthropist, businesswoman
- Organization: CMI Guatemala
- Spouse: Alfonso Bosch (died 1974)
- Children: 5, including Juan Luis and Felipe
- Parent(s): Juan Bautista Gutiérrez; Felipa Gutiérrez
- Relatives: Juan José Gutiérrez Mayorga (nephew); Dionisio Gutiérrez Mayorga (nephew)

Isabel Gutiérrez de Bosch (23 July 1931 – 6 September 2020) was a Guatemalan businesswoman and philanthropist who was awarded the Order of the Quetzal in 2005.

== Biography ==
Isabel Gutiérrez de Bosch was born at San Cristóbal Totonicapán on 23 July 1931, the daughter of Juan Bautista Gutiérrez, founder of the Corporación Multi Inversiones (CMI). She lived until the age of 5 in Totonicapán, after which her family moved to Quetzaltenango, where she remained until at age 19.

She married Alfonso Bosch; they had five children, including Juan Luis and Felipe Bosch Gutiérrez, both businessmen. Her husband, along with her brother Dionisio, died in a plane crash in 1974 while most of her children were still young.

She was founder and president of Fundaniñas, an organization that cares for abandoned girls, girls in conflict with the law, and young, low-income girls with potential. She was the first female president of a Rotary Club in Central America. She was involved in a scholarship program for low-income Guatemalan youths pursue a college education, a health program for 13 to 18-year old youths, and a nutrition program addressing the problem of chronic malnutrition in rural Guatemala.

Isabel de Bosch was also president of the Juan Bautista Gutierrez Foundation, a Guatemalan philanthropic organization that belongs to Corporación Multi Inversiones (CMI). The Foundation was established in 1974 and provided relief in the earthquake of 1976, Hurricane Mitch in 1998 and the hospital crisis of 2015.

She died in Guatemala City on 6 September 2020. The Isabel Gutiérrez de Bosch Foundation continues her work in child development and nutrition.

== Awards ==
- 1990: The Rotary International Paul Harris Award
- 1993: Dolores Bedoya de Molina Grand Collar Award
- 1995: “Celebration of our Values” recognition by Banco Industrial
- 2005: The Order of the Quetzal (Grand Officer), Guatemala's highest honour
- 2012: Rotary International awarded Gutiérrez a special recognition to her Rotary service, on the occasion of the 90th anniversary of Rotary presence in Central America
- 2019: Golden Fork Award, Person of the Year, at the Food Fair in Guatemala
- 2020: Forbes Central America recognized her as one of the most powerful women of the year
