= Juan Bautista Gutiérrez =

Spanish-born businessman

- Born: Juan Bautista Gutiérrez Blanco; 14 June 1896 (Note: While 14 June 1896 is his most widely reported date of birth, as it is on his official website as well as most available sources, the CMI and FJBG webpages and a few others, cite a date of 15 June 1895.); Sobrescobio, Asturias, Spain
- Died: November 1978 (aged 82); Guatemala City, Guatemala
- Occupation(s): Businessman; Philanthropist
- Known for: Corporación Multi Inversiones; Juan Bautista Gutiérrez Foundation
- Spouse: Felipa Gutiérrez Álvarez (m. 1927; died 1975)
- Children: 3, including Isabel
- Parent(s): Dionisio Gutiérrez; Casimira Blanco
- Relatives: Juan Luis Bosch Gutiérrez (grandson); Felipe Bosch Gutiérrez (grandson); Juan José Gutiérrez Mayorga (grandson); Dionisio Gutierrez Mayorga (grandson)
- Website: https://juanbautistagutierrez.com/

Juan Bautista Gutiérrez Blanco (14 June 1896 – November 1978) was a Spanish-Guatemalan businessman. He founded the Guatemalan company Corporación Multi Inversiones, as well as its philanthropic organization, Juan Bautista Gutiérrez Foundation.

== Early life ==
Juan Bautista Gutiérrez Blanco was born on 14 June 1896 in the Campiellos village of Sobrescobio, Asturias, Spain. In 1902, Juan Bautista Gutiérrez's father, Dionisio Gutiérrez, migrated to the Americas, while Juan Bautista himself migrated in 1911.

== Career ==
In Guatemala, Gutiérrez began to work as a storekeeper at his father's shop in San Cristóbal Totonicapán, with which in 1920 he planted the seed of Corporación Multi Inversiones.

Because there was no electric power in the town, Gutiérrez also became a candle maker. He decided to learn accounting in the School for Commerce in Quetzaltenango. In 1932, the same year his son Dionisio was born, he was elected Mayor of San Cristóbal. During his tenure, he built works that improved the conditions of roads, drainage and water utilities. He introduced electricity in the town and built the bridge of the Samalá River that, after 75 years, is still in good working condition and actively utilized by the community.

In 1936, Don Juan Bautista, together with another investor, created Molino Excelsior. He led and supervised the Gutiérrez gas station and the construction of Molino Excelsior. His workload grew because he purchased the Chevrolet car dealership and a few years later; in addition, he added the German Opel. Soon after, he purchased La Sevillana, a supermarket with products imported from Spain, England and Germany, and where he also sold the Spanish wines that he had been importing for years now.

In 1967, don Juan Bautista, together with Alfonso Bosch, opened “Los Pollos”, a cafeteria that served a fried chicken made with a recipe that was very widely accepted by the public. Later in 1971, together with his son Dionisio, as well as with Francisco Pérez de Antón and Javier Iraizos, he tested other recipes and condiments and finally opened the first Pollo Campero restaurant, of which Dionisio was appointed CEO.

In 1977, Gutiérrez, with the support of Francisco Pérez de Antón, Andrés Sedano and his grandchildren, created the hallmark company with decentralized management and devoted to the creation of new businesses, presently known as CMI. This would also be his final project before his death in 1978.

== Personal life ==
On 2 April 1927, Don Juan Bautista and Doña Felipa Gutiérrez Álvarez were married in Seville, Spain. They had three children:

- Juan Arturo (1930 – 24 June 2016)
- Isabel (23 July 1931 – 6 September 2020)
- Dionisio (10 November 1932 – 3 October 1974)

In 1974, Don Juan Bautista suffered the loss of his youngest son, Dionisio, and of his son-in-law, Alfonso Bosch, in a plane crash. This marked the progressive entry of his grandchildren, both of the Gutiérrez Mayorga and Bosch Gutierrez branches, into the family business as they became of age.

Following stakeholder disputes with other relatives, his oldest son, Juan Arturo, left the family business and moved to Canada with his family in 1982 after his own son, Juan Guillermo, was kidnapped. Juan Arturo died in Toronto in 2016.

=== Death ===
Following the death of his son Dionisio, Gutiérrez and his wife Felipa soon began suffering from health problems; despite this, Gutiérrez never stopped working, focusing his energy on CMI in his final years. Doña Felipa died in 1975, the year after Dionisio's death, while Don Juan Bautista died three years later from cancer in November 1978. Most of his grandchildren continue to be involved in the family business and philanthropy.
