= José Rubén Zamora =

Guatemalan engineer and entrepreneur

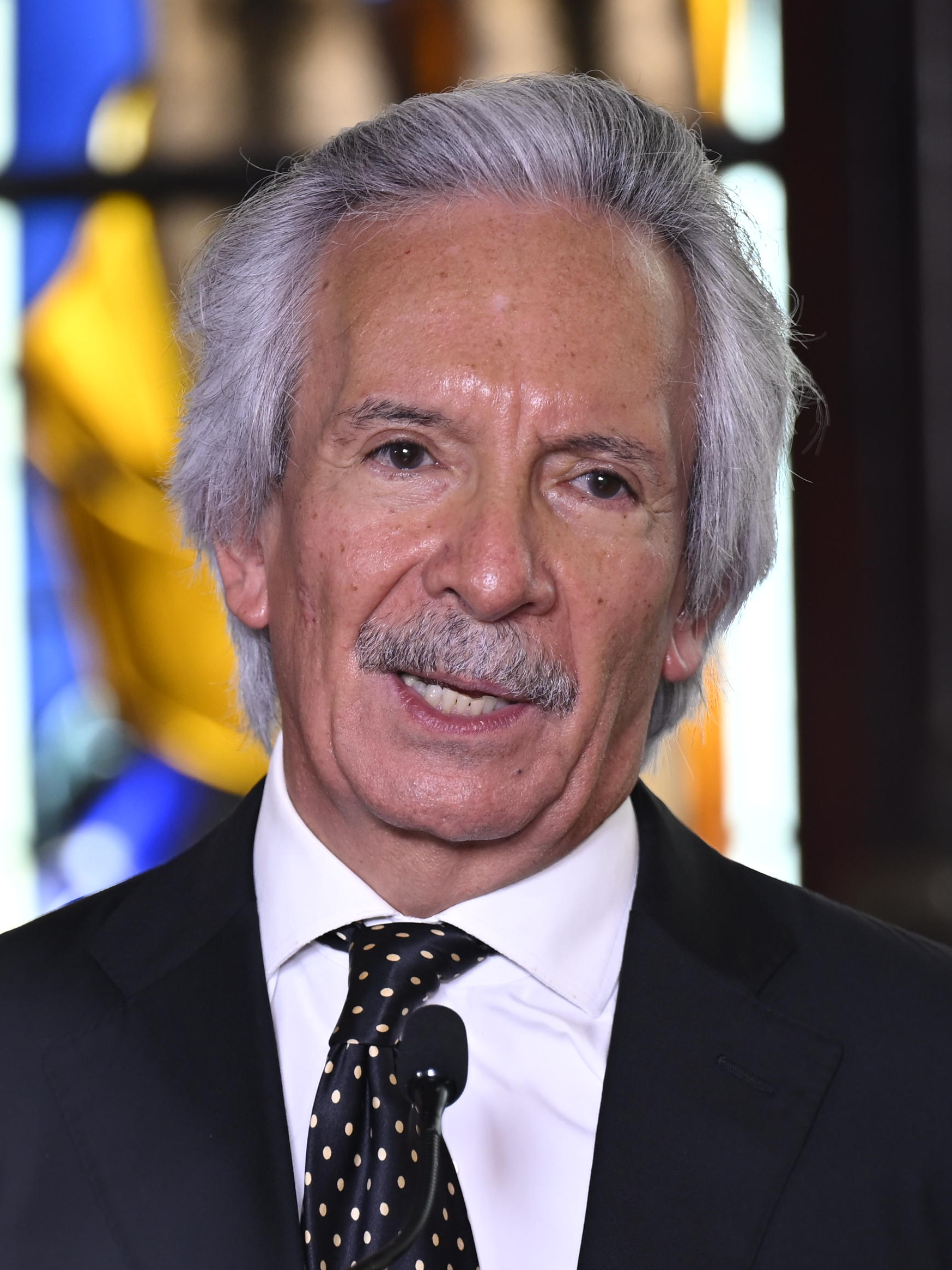
- Rubén Zamora in 2024
- Born: August 19, 1956 (age 69)
- Occupation: journalist
- Organization(s): Siglo Veintiuno (1990–96); El Periódico (1996–2023)
- Awards: International Press Freedom Award (1995); Maria Moors Cabot Prize (1995); World Press Freedom Hero (2000); Knight International Journalism Award (2003)

José Rubén Zamora Marroquín (born August 19, 1956) is a Guatemalan industrial engineer, entrepreneur, and the founder of three Guatemalan newspapers: Siglo Veintiuno ("21st Century") in 1990, El Periódico ("The Newspaper") in 1996, and Nuestro Diario ("Our Daily") in 1998. He has been threatened and attacked on several occasions for his work, including being held hostage in his home in 2003 and being kidnapped and beaten in 2008.

Zamora has received numerous international prizes and distinctions. He was awarded the Maria Moors Cabot Prize from Columbia University in 1994, an International Press Freedom Award from the Committee to Protect Journalists in 1994, was named as one of 50 World Press Freedom Heroes of the 20th century by the International Press Institute in 2000, and the John S. and James L. Knight Foundation awarded him its International Journalism Award in 2003.

On July 29, 2022, Zamora was arrested on charges of money laundering that are widely seen as a retaliation against his coverage of corruption in the Guatemalan government. In 2023, he was sentenced to 6 years in prison. That conviction was overturned by another court, and a new trial ordered. A court ordered his release on May 15, 2024, with the judge ruling that he was not considered a flight risk or a threat to the investigation. The Media Development Investment Fund, which had invested in one of his newspapers, said it welcomed his conditional release but called on the judiciary to "deliver timely justice in the other pending case against him."

== Education and early career ==
Zamora began working as a reporter in La Hora ("The Hour"), a newspaper owned by his family, when he was 17. He earned degrees in industrial engineering and business administration and in 1986 founded ANC, a documentary and news production company in 1985.

== Siglo Veintiuno ==
In 1990, Zamora founded his first newspaper, Siglo Veintiuno. The paper advocated judicial and tax reforms, and reported on dangerous subjects including narcotics smuggling, human rights issues, guerrilla groups, and corruption in the government of President Jorge Serrano. As a result, Zamora and the staff received death threats and were subject to physical attacks.

Three years later, Guatemala saw a constitutional crisis, in which Serrano suspended the constitution and dissolved Congress. He also instituted press censorship, surrounding the Siglo Veintiuno offices with national police forces. During this period, Zamora satirized the censorship by renaming his paper Siglo Catorce ("14th Century") and running stories covered in solid blocks of ink; he also faxed uncensored versions of the stories to newspapers in neighboring countries. The International Press Institute credits this clandestine reporting with contributing to Serrano's condemnation by the international community and his eventual flight from the country.

In May 1996, Zamora left the paper following disagreements with its board of directors.

== El Periódico ==
Zamora's new newspaper, El Periódico, launched on November 6, 1996, funded by the donations of 125 citizens who supported his stand on press freedom. One year later, it was bought by the owners of Prensa Libre, Guatemala's best-selling newspaper.

In 2001, the Periódico offices were attacked by a group of fifty protesters after reporting on alleged corruption in the staff of Communications Minister Luis Rabbé. The crowd attempted to force the building's doors and set it on fire, and Zamora was burned in effigy. According to the Committee to Protect Journalists, police took more than forty minutes to respond and made no arrests.

The newspaper conducted a lengthy investigation into links between the government of President Alfonso Portillo and organized crime, the results of which were published in November 2002. The government then sent auditors to the Periódico offices for 40 days, withdrawing them only after a complaint by the World Association of Newspapers (WAN).

== Attacks on Zamora ==
Zamora has been attacked several times in connection with his reporting. In 1995, his car was driven off the road by two people who threatened to kill him for publishing allegations in Siglo Veintiuno that the military of Guatemala had links to organized crime. In May 1996, attackers drove past his parked car, throwing two grenades at it; Zamora was unhurt because there was no one in the car at the time.

In June 2003, Zamora and his family were held hostage in their home for hours by a group of eleven men and one woman. The attackers beat Zamora's children and forced him to strip and kneel at gunpoint. According to Zamora, one of the gang stated: "If you value your children stop bothering the people above. I don't know who you've annoyed high up the ladder, but we have orders that someone up high despises you. Whatever you do, do not report this." The US government condemned the attack and called for an investigation. WAN also issued a statement on Zamora's behalf following the attack, calling on President Portillo to bring the attackers to justice and protect the safety of his nation's journalists.

Portillo then unexpectedly visited Zamora to offer assistance, including allowing him access to a photographic database of government and armed forces members. In late January 2004, Zamora published the names and photographs of the men and woman he alleged to be his attackers in El Periódico; they included a senior member of Portillo's staff, an employee of the Attorney General, and a counter-intelligence specialist. Two years later, former member of the military Eduviges Funes was later sentenced to sixteen years' imprisonment for his role in the attack. Another former soldier, Belter Álvarez, was acquitted.

On August 20, 2008, Zamora was kidnapped and beaten after a dinner with friends in Guatemala City, and was left unconscious and nearly naked in Chimaltenango, 25 kilometres (16 mi) away.

== Awards ==
In 1995, Zamora and the Siglo Veintiuno staff won International Press Freedom Awards from the Committee to Protect Journalists, which recognize courage in defending press freedom despite facing attacks, threats, or imprisonment. In the same year, he won the Maria Moors Cabot Prize from Columbia University "for promoting press freedom and inter-American understanding". In 2000, he was named one of 50 World Press Freedom Heroes of the 20th century by the International Press Institute. The citation stated that "Zamora and Siglo Veintiuno were in the forefront of a civilian resistance that forced President Jorge Serrano Elias to relinquish his post after he attempted to seize dictatorial power in 1993."

The John S. and James L. Knight Foundation awarded him its International Journalism Award in 2003.

In Guatemala, he was recognized as a Distinguished Engineer by the Professional College of Engineers in 2014 and as an Illustrious Graduate of the Universidad de San Carlos de Guatemala in 2015. He was also awarded the Myrna Mack Prize for the defense of human rights by the Guatemalan Human Rights Commission in 2015.

== Arrest ==
On July 29, 2022, Zamora was arrested on charges of money laundering. However, his arrest was widely seen as a retaliation against his coverage of corrupt practices by the Guatemalan government under president Alejandro Giammattei and was criticized locally and internationally by journalists, freedom of the press activists, political opposition in Guatemala, human rights NGOs, the business sector, the United States, Canada, and the European Union. He was sentenced to 6 years in prison on June 15, 2023. Zamora denied all charges and alleged that he had been given no rights to a defense.

On May 15, 2024, Judge Verónica Ruiz of the Ninth Sentencing Court granted Zamora house arrest after Ruiz found little risk of Zamora fleeing the country or obstructing the investigation against him. He was moved to his residence on 18 October. However, his house arrest was reversed following an appeal by prosecutors in November. In March 2025, Zamora was returned to prison.

On 12 February 2026, a judge ordered Zamora to be placed under house arrest pending his trial.
