= La Red =

La Red (Spanish for "The Network" or "The Net") may refer to:

- Rossana (film), known in Spanish as La red, a 1953 Mexican drama directed by Emilio Fernández
- La Red (Chilean TV channel), a private television channel in Chile
- La Red (Uruguayan TV channel), a television channel in Uruguay
- La Red (TV program), a Colombian variety show with Ronald Mayorga

== See also ==
- Red (disambiguation)
- The Net (disambiguation)
