= Juan Luis Bosch Gutiérrez =

Guatemalan businessman

- Born: Guatemala City, Guatemala
- Occupation: Businessman
- Organization: Corporación Multi Inversiones

Juan Luis Bosch Gutiérrez is a Guatemalan businessman, a grandson of Spanish-born businessman Juan Bautista Gutiérrez as well as a son of Alfonso Bosch and Isabel Gutiérrez de Bosch, the late chairwoman of the Fundación Juan Bautista Gutiérrez. He is married to Elvira Molina de Bosch and has 4 children.

For more than 50 years he has actively directed the growth and expansion strategies of the Corporation’s businesses through roles such as Chairman of the CMI Capital Business Group and recently as Chairman of the Board of Directors of CMI.(Corporación Multi Inversiones), a family multi-Latin corporation founded in Guatemala in 1920.

CMI currently employs over 50,000 people in 16 countries in 2 continents, creating investment, jobs, and development in the region. During over 45 years, Juan Luis Bosch has led the corporation's growth and expansion strategies. He is currently a member of the board of directors of Banco Industrial and PRONACA, a leading Ecuadorian food producer and distributor.

In 2021, he was recognized as "Distinguished Industrial" by the Chamber of Industry of Guatemala, and in 2022, he was selected as Manager of the Year by the Association of Managers of Guatemala, an award that has been given since 2005.

Together with Juan José Gutiérrez Mayorga, they have guided the strategic vision of Corporación Multi Inversiones for over 45 years.

Bosh Gutiérrez is part of the third generation in charge of the family business. "My grandfather had a true devotion to spending time with his grandchildren. As we grew up and learned to drive, there was always one of us acting as his chauffeur, his secretary, and he always talked to us about principles. He used to say that one should go to work content, but when one leaves, one should be happy, happy, happy. In his honor, we've devised the acronym REÍR, which defines the values of both the family and the company," he expressed in the publication of the book "The essence of the family business" in 2019.

== Academic background ==
Juan Luis Bosch Gutiérrez graduated from High School from Liceo Javier in Guatemala. He studied Industrial-Mechanical Engineering at Universidad Rafael Landívar, also in Guatemala. He has also completed Business Administration and strategic planning studies.

== Work experience ==
His work experience includes:

- 1972–1974 – Administration of Molinos Modernos, S. A. Guatemala.
- 1974 to date – Holding different positions in Multi-Inversiones S.A. Guatemala
- 1978 to date – Alternate Board Member of Banco Industrial S.A. Guatemala
- Currently, Chairman of CMI Capital (Corporación Multi-Inversiones) Guatemala
- With the Regional Group, overseeing investments in Central America, the Dominican Republic, Mexico, and franchise development in the United States
- Food Industry (wheat flour derivatives, integrated poultry farming, Pollo Campero fast food restaurants), real estate development, finances, and hydroelectric power
- Board member of Banco Industrial de Guatemala
- Board member of Fundación Universidad del Valle De Guatemala
- Founder of Siglo Veintiuno newspaper in Guatemala
- Board member of various Regional Investment Companies
- Board Member of Bain Consulting Mexico
- Former Director of Telefónica de Centroamérica (TELCA)

== Participation in several organizations ==
Juan Luis Bosch Gutiérrez has led the Chamber of Industry of Guatemala (CIG) as well as the Coordinating Committee of Agricultural, Commercial, Industrial and Financial Associations (CACIF), the most important coordination body of the organized productive sector of Guatemala.

Juan Luis Bosch is a member of the Council of the Americas (COA), that gathers some of the top U. S. Blue Chip companies, and whose objective is to promote free trade, democracy and open trade in America. COA was established in 1963 under the name Business Group for Latin America, by David Rockefeller, at the behest of President John F. Kennedy.

Bosch Gutiérrez is also the founder of the Central American Leadership Initiative (CALI), an effort, together with INCAE (the Central American Business Administration Institute), and the Aspen Institute, to improve future leaderships in Central America through networks that seek to provide support to develop the region.

He is the founder of CEAL – Business Council of Latin America – which was created around 1992, to form a community of business leaders interested in supporting the economic and social growth of Latin America.

He is also a member of the board of directors of Fundación Juan Bautista Gutiérrez, CMI's social outreach organization that supports projects mainly focused on education and health in Guatemala.

He participated as a panelist in the XVI in the "Ibero-American Business Summit" in which energy, commerce and logistics were the main issues addressed.

== Public experience ==
- President of CACIF Guatemala (1989).
- President of the Chamber of Industry of Guatemala.
- Leader of the Peace Accords CACIF Follow-up Commission
- Chair of Asociación de Avicultores de Guatemala -Poultry Farmers’ Association.
- Chair of Central America 2000 – an organization of Central American business leaders.
- Founder of FUNDESA – Fundación para el Desarrollo de Guatemala – (Foundation for the Development of Guatemala)
- Founder of Fundación DIG – Fundación para el Desarrollo Institucional de Guatemala – (Foundation for Institutional Development of Guatemala), promoting ESTNA Center.
- Member of the Board of Trustees of Universidad Del Valle de Guatemala.
- Founder of Fundación Juan Bautista Gutiérrez
