= Juan Bautista Gutiérrez Foundation =

Guatemalan philanthropic entity

The Juan Bautista Gutiérrez Foundation (Spanish: Fundación Juan Bautista Gutiérrez) is a Guatemalan philanthropic entity that belongs to the Corporación Multi Inversiones (CMI). Juan Bautista Gutiérrez was one of the founders of "Corporación Multi Inversiones". The Foundation was established in 1974 and has since helped several national crises such as the 1976 earthquake, Hurricane Mitch in 1998 and the hospital crisis of 2015.

== History ==
On 3 October 1974, Guatemalan businessmen Dionisio Gutiérrez and Alfonso Bosch, Juan Bautista's son and son-in-law respectively, died in a plane crash while en route to Honduras to assist and support victims of Hurricane Fifi. The plane was carrying a shipment of medicines that had been collected by the Rotary Club of Guatemala, but was obstructed by weather conditions and cargo weight near the village of Las Nubes. The descendants of the deceased, owners of companies such as Pollo Campero, Avícola Villalobos and Empacadora Toledo created the "Juan Bautista Gutiérrez Foundation" to centralize a series of social projects that they had carried out for several years.

=== Earthquake of 4 February 1976 in Guatemala ===
On 4 February 1976, a 7.5 magnitude earthquake that shook Guatemala destroyed a third of the City and Guatemala and entire villages were reduced to rubble. Approximately twenty-three thousand people died, seventy-six thousand were injured and there were more of one million victims.

After the 1976 Guatemala earthquake, the Foundation took over the reconstruction of the school in the municipality of San Cristóbal Totonicapán, which the inhabitants baptized under the name of the "Juan Bautista Gutiérrez" School; in fact, the Foundation has been active in the operation of the school since then.

=== Famine in Camotán and Jocotán ===
On 3 August 2001, the municipality of Jocotán declared "yellow alert" in the municipality, having knowledge of the situation in the communities of the rural area of Corredor Seco. The triggers of this situation were, on the one hand, the decrease in rainfall, and on the other, the lack of income from agricultural wages; this caused a situation of nutritional food insecurity that was evidenced by the increase of malnourished girls, boys and women. The government of President Alfonso Portillo decreed a state of public calamity to mobilize international aid; officially forty-eight fatalities were recognized, but there were rumors of a much higher number.

During the food crisis that has been recorded in Jocotán, Camotán and Olopa, Chiquimula, many private organizations joined the common cause of help. One of them was the Juan Bautista Gutierrez Foundation who generated sources of support for these communities.

=== Hurricane Mitch ===
As in the rest of Central America, Hurricane Mitch caused heavy rains that caused landslides and severe flooding, which destroyed six thousand houses and damaged another twenty thousand, forcing the evacuation of more than one hundred thousand people; In addition, floods caused severe crop damage while landslides destroyed arable land throughout the country.4 Transport infrastructure was also damaged, as 1,350 km of roads were destroyed or damaged. In total, the hurricane caused two hundred and sixty-eight deaths in Guatemala.

To help the victims of the hurricane, the Juan Bautista Gutiérrez Foundation provided eighty thousand bags of food in Guatemala, and thirty thousand in Honduras.

=== 2015 Hospital Crisis ===
On 27 May 2015, in the midst of the acute administrative and political crisis caused by the corruption cases of "La Linea" and "IGSS-Pisa" discovered by the International Commission against Impunity in Guatemala, the deficit became evident that affected national hospitals and that prevented the acquisition of food, medicines, payment of services and acquisition of surgical material.

The necessary budget for the proper functioning of the hospitals was 483 million quetzals, but the budget allocated by the Ministry of Public Health and Social Assistance of Guatemala for 2015 was only 282 million quetzals; They also indicated that it was urgent for the Ministry of Health to pay the debt of 133 million in 2014, which increased the deficit to 54%.

At the end of 2015, the Juan Bautista Gutiérrez Foundation promoted the #GuatePorElRoosevelt movement together with Pollo Campero and Corporación Multi Inversiones (CMI) to make a contribution and reduce the hospital crisis in the country.

== Educational programs ==
The Foundation maintains several educational programs, among which are:

- The educator of the new century.
- Supporting those who support
- University Scholarship Programs
