= C21 =

C-21, C 21, or C21 may refer to:

- C21 Sako TRG M10 Sniper Weapon System, Canadian Armed Forces sniper rifle.
- C21 (group), a Danish boy band
  - C21 (album), 2003
- C-21 Dolphin, a flying boat used by the United States Army Air Corps
- HMS C21, a 1909 British C class submarine
- Learjet C-21, an American military transport aircraft
- Sauber C21, a 2002 racing car
- Space Adventures C-21, a Russian design for a suborbital rocket plane for Space Adventures
- Anal cancer (ICD-10 code: C21)
- Center Game (Encyclopaedia of Chess Openings code: C21)
- Caldwell 21 or NGC 4449, an irregular galaxy in the constellation Canes Venatici
- Carbon-21 (C-21 or ^{21}C), an isotope of carbon
- Catch 21, a television game show based on blackjack
- HMS Glasgow (C21)

== See also ==
- 21st century
- Century 21 (disambiguation)
- 21c (disambiguation)
