= 21st century (disambiguation) =

The 21st century of the Anno Domini or Common Era runs from 2001 through 2100.

21st century may also refer to:

== Media ==
- Twenty-First Century, a Hong Kong intellectual journal influential in China during the early 1990s
- The 21st Century, an American television news show hosted by Walter Cronkite, originally called The 20th Century
- 21st Century Fox, an American mass-media conglomerate acquired by Disney

== Music ==
- 21st Century (Blue System album), 1994
- "21st Century Girl", a song from Wings by the group BTS
- 21st Century (Groove Coverage album), 2006
- 21st Century, an album by Lincoln Thompson, 1997
- "21st Century (Digital Boy)", a song by Bad Religion, 1990
- "21st Century", a song by Red Hot Chili Peppers from Stadium Arcadium, 2006
- "21st Century Boy", a song by Sigue Sigue Sputnik, 1986
- 21st Century Romance, a song from 7th Year: A Moment of Stillness in the Thorns by the group Tomorrow X Together
- 21st Century Breakdown, an album by Green Day, 2009
- Twenty First Century Skinned, an album by Praga Khan, 1999
- "21st Century Schizoid Man", a song by King Crimson, 1969

== Business ==
- 21st Century Network (21CN), a networking project by BT Group plc
- 21st Century Insurance, a subsidiary of Farmers Insurance Group

== See also ==
- 21st century BC
- Century 21 (disambiguation)
- Siglo XXI (disambiguation)
