= Angélica García Arrieta =

Mexican politician

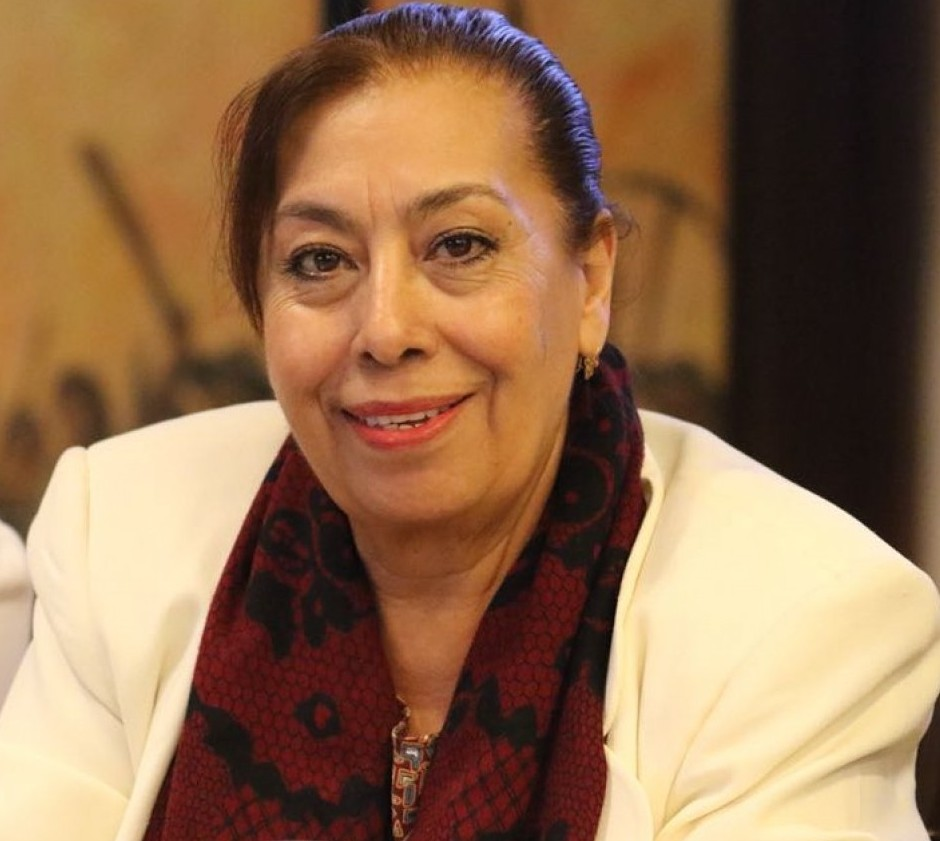
- Born: August 27, 1958
- Died: December 22, 2018 (aged 60)
- Occupation: Politician

Angélica García Arrieta (27 August 1958 – 22 December 2018) was a Mexican public accountant and politician, Senator in the LXIV Legislature of the Mexican Congress, and founder of the National Regeneration Movement political party.

== Life ==
García Arrieta, a native of Tetepango, obtained her degree in accounting in 1981 from the Universidad Autónoma del Estado de Hidalgo. She worked as an auditor in the 1980s at the general hospital of Pachuca, at the state CONASUPO distributor, and at DICONSA. In 1999, she was elected to a three-year term as a local deputy in the Hidalgo state legislature. In 2005, García Arrieta served as the coordinator of get-out-the-vote efforts for Andrés Manuel López Obrador in Tepeapulco, Hidalgo; at the time, both she and López Obrador were members of the Party of the Democratic Revolution. After the 2012 election, she became a founding member of MORENA and rose to become the secretary general of the state party in Hidalgo. García Arrieta was elected to the Senate in June 2018, sharing a ticket with Julio Ramón Menchaca Salazar. She was the secretary of the Mining and Regional Development Commission and sat on four other commissions in the Senate.

Her death was announced by Senate leader Martí Batres Guadarrama on 22 December 2018. Friends of the senator stated she died due to complications of diabetes. Alternate senator María Merced González González, an environmental activist and accountant, was sworn in to replace her on January 2, 2019.
