= El Periódico (Guatemala) =

Guatemalan newspaper

- Type: Daily newspaper
- Founder: José Rubén Zamora
- Founded: November 6, 1996
- Ceased publication: May 15, 2023
- Language: Spanish
- Headquarters: Guatemala
- Sister newspapers: Prensa Libre
- Website: http://www.elperiodico.com.gt

El Periódico was a daily Guatemalan newspaper founded by José Rubén Zamora on November 6, 1996.

== History ==
Considered one of Central America's leading independent journalists, Zamora had left his previous paper, Siglo Veintiuno, earlier in the year after a disagreement with the board of directors. He then founded Periódico, funded by the donations of 125 citizens who supported his stand on press freedom. One year later, it was purchased by the owners of Prensa Libre, Guatemala's best-selling newspaper.

In 2001, the Periódico offices were attacked by a group of fifty protesters after reporting on alleged corruption in the staff of Communications Minister Luis Rabbé. The crowd attempted to force the building's doors and set it on fire, and Zamora was burned in effigy. According to the Committee to Protect Journalists, police took more than forty minutes to respond and made no arrests.

The newspaper conducted a lengthy investigation into links between the government of President Alfonso Portillo and organized crime, the results of which were published in November 2002. The government then sent auditors to the Periódico offices for 40 days, withdrawing them only after a complaint by the World Association of Newspapers (WAN).

In July 2022, Zamora was detained on charges of money laundering. The assets of the newspaper were frozen as part of the case against Zamora, and the newspaper could no longer sustain itself financially. El Periódico published its final edition on May 15, 2023.

== Attacks on Zamora ==
Zamora was attacked on several occasions for reasons related to Periódico's reporting. In June 2003, Zamora and his family were held hostage in their home for hours by a group of eleven men and one woman. The attackers beat Zamora's children and forced him to strip and kneel at gunpoint. According to Zamora, one of the gang stated: "If you value your children stop bothering the people above. I don't know who you've annoyed high up the ladder, but we have orders that someone up high despises you. Whatever you do, do not report this." The US government condemned the attack and called for an investigation. WAN also issued a statement on Zamora's behalf following the attack, calling on President Portillo to bring the attackers to justice and protect the safety of his nation's journalists.

Portillo then unexpectedly visited Zamora to offer assistance, including allowing him access to a photographic database of government and armed forces members. In late January 2004, Zamora published the names and photographs of the men and woman he alleged to be his attackers in El Periódico; they included a senior member of Portillo's staff, an employee of the Attorney General, and a counter-intelligence specialist. Two years later, former member of the military Eduviges Funes was later sentenced to sixteen years' imprisonment for his role in the attack. Another former soldier, Belter Álvarez, was acquitted.

On August 20, 2008, Zamora was kidnapped and beaten after a dinner with friends in Guatemala City, and was left unconscious and nearly naked in Chimaltenango, 25 kilometres (16 mi) away.

== See also ==
- List of newspapers in Guatemala
