= List of newspapers in Guatemala =

This is a list of newspapers in Guatemala.

== Newspapers ==
- Prensa Libre, the second-most widely circulated newspaper in Guatemala
- Al Día
- Noticias Guatemala
- Diario de Centro América, the nation's newspaper of public record
- La Hora
- El Metropolitano, based in Mixco; published twice each month
- Nuestro Diario, the most widely circulated newspaper in Central America
- El Periódico, no longer in circulation
- Publinews, the first free daily in Guatemala
- El Quetzalteco, based in Quetzaltenango; digital only and part of Prensa Libre
- El Siglo
- Siglo Veintiuno
- La Voz del Migrante
- La Epoca, no longer in circulation
- El Gráfico, no longer in circulation
- El Imparcial, no longer in circulation

== See also ==
- Media of Guatemala
