= Nuvia Mayorga Delgado =

Mexican politician

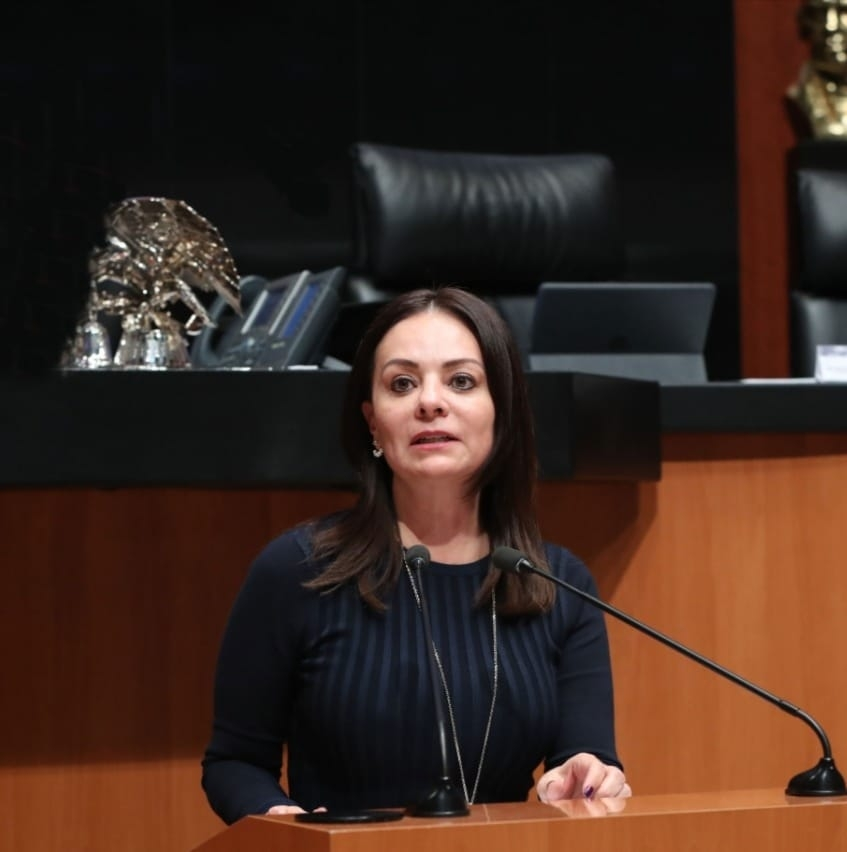
- Mayorga Delgado in 2021

Senator of the Congress of the Union for Hidalgo
- In office 1 September 2018 – 31 August 2024 Serving with María Merced González González and Navor Rojas Mancera
- Preceded by: Isidro Pedraza Chávez
- Succeeded by: Carolina Viggiano

Personal details
- Born: Nuvia Magdalena Mayorga Delgado; 31 January 1966 (age 60) Mexico City, Mexico
- Party: PRI
- Education: UAEH
- Occupation: Politician

Nuvia Magdalena Mayorga Delgado (Note: In this Mexican name, the surname is Mayorga and the second or maternal family name is Delgado.) (born 31 January 1966) is a Mexican politician affiliated with the Institutional Revolutionary Party (PRI). Born in Mexico City, she has represented her party in both chambers of Congress.

In the 2012 general election, she was elected to a plurinominal seat (5th region) in the Chamber of Deputies for the duration of the 62nd Congress. From 2013 to 2018 she was the director general of the National Commission for the Development of Indigenous Peoples.

In 2018, she was elected to a six-year term in the Senate for the state of Hidalgo.
