= 21c =

21c or 21C may refer to:

- 21c (TV series), a Canadian newsmagazine
- 21c Museum Hotel, an American hotel chain
- Carbon-21 (^{21}C), an isotope of carbon
- Czinger 21C, an American hybrid supercar

== See also ==
- 21st century
- MIKE 21C
- Techno Police 21C
- C21 (disambiguation)
