= Corporación Multi Inversiones =

Guatemala-based agro-industrial corporation

Multi Investment Corporation
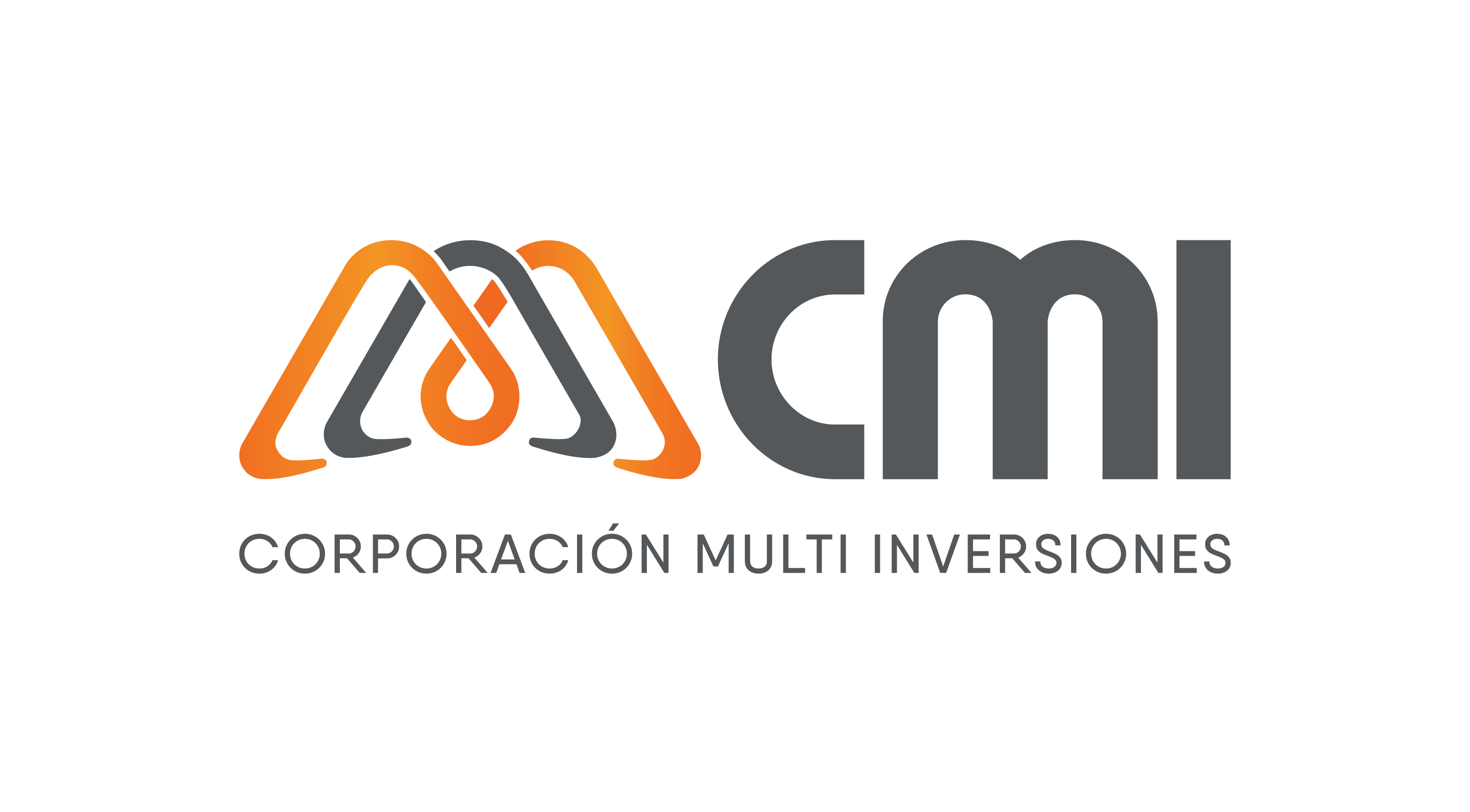
- Native name: Corporación Multi Inversiones
- Industry: Conglomerate
- Founded: 1920; 106 years ago
- Founder: Juan Bautista Gutiérrez
- Headquarters: Guatemala City, Guatemala
- Area served: Worldwide
- Key people: Juan José Gutiérrez; Dionisio Gutiérrez; Juan Luis Bosch Gutiérrez; Felipe Bosch Gutiérrez
- Products: Fast food, real estate, finance, energy
- Number of employees: 54,000 (2025)
- Website: somoscmi.com

Corporación Multi Inversiones (CMI) is a multinational corporation based in Guatemala. It was founded in the 1920s by Juan Bautista Gutiérrez as a family business.

The company operates in two main business segments: food production and capital investments. Its activities include flour milling, pasta and packaged food production, poultry and pork processing, animal feed manufacturing, restaurant operations, renewable energy generation, real estate development, and financial services.

CMI has operations in multiple countries across the Americas and Europe.

== Business units ==
- B4B – milling and animal feed production.
- Meat Solutions – poultry and pork processing.
- B4C – consumer goods such as pasta, cookies and sauces.
- Restaurants & Retail – restaurant brands including Pollo Campero.
- Campero USA – operations and franchises in the United States.
- Energy – renewable energy generation projects.
- Real Estate Development – construction and property development.
- Finances – financial and investment services.

== History ==
The company originated in 1920 with a small store in Totonicapán, Guatemala.

In 1936, the "Molino Excelsior" flour mill was established in Quetzaltenango.

In 1964, poultry operations began with the Villalobos Poultry Farm. In 1971, the restaurant brand "Pollo Campero" was launched.

During the 1980s and 1990s, the company expanded into construction, finance, and international markets in Central America and the Caribbean.

== Milestones ==
- 2002 – Launch of Pollo Campero franchise model in the United States.
- 2004 – Entry into the energy sector.
- 2013 – Expansion into Mexico with acquisition of a flour mill.
- 2017 – Investment in renewable energy projects.
- 2021 – Issuance of green bonds.
- 2022 – Announcement of regional infrastructure investments.
