= Jean-Pierre Gattuso =

French ocean scientist (born 1958)

- Born: Jean-Pierre Gattuso; 14 December 1958 (age 67); Antibes, France
- Education: University of Nice, University of Aix-Marseille II
- Known for: Role of coral reefs in the global carbon cycle, Consequences of ocean acidification
- Scientific career
- Fields: Biology, ecology, biogeochemistry
- Workplaces: CNRS Research Professor at Sorbonne University; Associate researcher at Institute for Sustainable Development and International Relations(IDDRI)
- Academic advisors: Jean Jaubert

Jean-Pierre Gattuso (French pronunciation: [ʒɑ̃ pjɛʁ gatɥzo]) (born 14 December 1958 in Antibes) is a French ocean scientist conducting research globally, from the pole to the tropics and from nearshore to the open ocean. His research addresses the biology of reef-building corals, the biogeochemistry of coastal ecosystems, and the response of marine plants, animals and ecosystems to global environmental change. He is also interested in transdisciplinary research, collaborating with social scientists to address ocean-based solutions to minimize climate change and its impacts. He is currently a CNRS Research Professor at Sorbonne University.

== Education ==
Gattuso earned a bachelor's degree from the University of Nice (1980) and a master's degree in oceanography at the University of Aix-Marseille II. In 1987, he obtained a Ph.D. in oceanography from the University of Aix-Marseille II.

== Career ==
Upon receiving his Ph.D., Gattuso moved to Australia where he was a postdoctoral researcher at the Australian Institute of Marine Science(1988-1990). In 1990, Gattuso took a position of CNRS research scientist at Centre de Biologie et Écologie Tropicale et Méditerranéenne of the University of Perpignan (1990-1992). He then moved to the Scientific Center of Monaco to launch and lead the Ecophysiology and Biogeochemistry group. In 1998, Gattuso went back to a CNRS joint laboratory at the Villefranche Oceanographic Observatory and moved to the ranks of Research Professor (directeur de recherche). He is also Associate Scientist at the Institute for Sustainable Development and International Relations (IDDRI-SciencesPo, Paris). Gattuso has been visiting professor or scientist at Rutgers University, the National Center for Atmospheric Research and Shantou University.

Gattuso is the founding editor-in-chief of Biogeosciences and served or has served in the editorial board of several scientific journals. He founded the Biogeosciences Division of the European Geosciences Union, and has received multiple awards and honors for his research contributions. He led the launch of the Ocean Acidification International Coordination Centre at the International Atomic Energy Agency, co-edited the first book on ocean acidification (Oxford University Press) and contributed to several IPCC products (5th Assessment Report, Special Report on 1.5°C of Warming, and the Special Report on the Ocean and Cryosphere in a Changing Climate).

Gattuso co-chaired the One Ocean Science Congress, a United Nations special event which preceded the 2025 United Nations Ocean Conference.

== Research ==
Gattuso was originally trained as a marine biologist. He first investigated photoadaptation of reef-building corals. He then looked at the cycling of carbon and carbonates in corals and coral reefs. These biogeochemical studies were expanded to temperate and Arctic coastal areas. Gattuso was an early investigator of the consequences of ocean acidification on marine organisms and ecosystems. He led the European Project on Ocean Acidification and is the lead developer of the R package seacarb (R package version 3.2.14.) His current research relates to the effects of ocean acidification and warming on marine ecosystems and the services that they provide to society. He also investigates ocean-based solutions to mitigate and adapt to climate change.

== Awards and distinctions ==
- 2025: Chevalier, Ordre national de la Légion d'honneur
- 2025: Engaged for the ocean award of Fondation de la mer
- 2024: Fellow, Association for the Sciences of Limnology and Oceanography
- 2023, Elected foreign member, Chinese Academy of Sciences
- 2020, Ruth Patrick Award, Association for the Sciences of Limnology and Oceanography
- 2018, Elected member, Academia Europaea
- 2014, Blaise Pascal Medal in Earth and Environmental Sciences, and elected member of the European Academy of Sciences
- 2012, Vladimir Vernadsky Medal, European Geosciences Union
- 2005, Union Service Award, European Geosciences Union
- 2002, Outstanding reviewer, Limnology & Oceanography
- 2001, Oceanography medal, Société d'océanographie de France

== Selected works ==
The complete list of papers is available here. Here are a few key papers :

- Gattuso, J.-P.; Frankignoulle, M.; Wollast, R. (1998). "Carbon and carbonate metabolism in coastal aquatic ecosystems". Annual Review of Ecology and Systematics. 29 (1): 405–434. Bibcode:1998AnRES..29..405G. doi:10.1146/annurev.ecolsys.29.1.405.
- Gattuso, J.-P.; Frankignoulle, M.; Smith, S. V. (1999). "Measurement of community metabolism and significance of coral reefs in the CO2 source-sink debate". Proceedings of the National Academy of Sciences of the United States of America. 96 (23): 13017–13022. doi:10.1073/pnas.96.23.13017. PMC 23892. PMID 10557265.
- Kleypas, J. A.; Buddemeier, R. W.; Archer, D.; Gattuso, J.-P.; Langdon, C.; Opdyke, B. N. (1999). "Geochemical consequences of increased atmospheric CO2 on coral reefs". Science. 284 (5411): 118–120. doi:10.1126/science.284.5411.118. PMID 10102806.
- Gattuso, J.-P.; Allemand, D.; Frankignoulle, M. (1999). "Photosynthesis and calcification at cellular, organismal and community levels in coral reefs: a review on interactions and control by carbonate chemistry". American Zoologist. 39 (1): 160–183. doi:10.1093/icb/39.1.160.
- Gattuso, J.-P.; Gentili, B. W.; Duarte, C. M.; Kleypas, J.A.; Middelburg, J. J.; Antoine, D. (2006). "Light availability in the coastal ocean: impact on the distribution of benthic photosynthetic organisms and their contribution to primary production". Biogeosciences. 3 (4): 489–513. Bibcode:2006BGeo....3..489G. doi:10.5194/bg-3-489-2006. hdl:20.500.11937/23744.
- Gazeau, F.; Quiblier, C.; Jansen, J. M.; Gattuso, J.-P.; Middelburg, J. J.; Heip, C. H. R. (2007). "Impact of elevated CO2 on shellfish calcification". Geophysical Research Letters. 34 (7): L07603. Bibcode:2007GeoRL..34.7603G. doi:10.1029/2006GL028554. hdl:20.500.11755/a8941c6a-6d0b-43d5-ba0d-157a7aa05668.
- Gattuso, J.-P.; Hansson, L.; "Ocean acidification" (Oxford University Press)
- Kroeker, K.; Kordas, R.; Crim, R.; Hendriks, I.; Ramajo, L.; Singh, G.; Duarte, C.; Gattuso, J.-P. (2013). "Impacts of ocean acidification on marine organisms: quantifying sensitivities and interaction with warming". Global Change Biology. 19 (6): 1884–1896. Bibcode:2013GCBio..19.1884K. doi:10.1111/gcb.12179. PMC 3664023. PMID 23505245.
- Gattuso, J.-P.; Magnan, A.; Billé, R.; Cheung, W.W.L.; Howes, E.L.; Joos, F.; Allemand, D.; Bopp, L.; Cooley, S.; Eakin, C.M.; Hoegh-Guldberg, O.; Kelly, R.P.; Pörtner, H.; Rogers, A.D.; Baxte, J.M.; Laffoley, D.; Osborn, D.; Rankovic, A.; Rochette, J.; Sumaila, U. R.; Treyer, S.; Turley, C. (2015). "Contrasting futures for ocean and society from different anthropogenic CO2 emissions scenarios" (PDF). Science. 349 (6243) aac4722. doi:10.1126/science.aac4722. PMID 26138982. S2CID 206639157.
- Magnan, A.K.; Colombier, M.; Billé, R.; Hoegh-Guldberg, O.; Joos, F.; Pörtner, H.-O; Waisman, H.; Spencer, T.; Gattuso, J.-P. (2016). "Implications of the Paris Agreement for the ocean". Nature Climate Change. 6 (8): 732–735. Bibcode:2016NatCC...6..732M. doi:10.1038/nclimate3038.
- Gattuso, J.-P.; Williamson, P.; Duarte, C.; Magnan, A.K. (2021). "The potential for ocean-based climate action: negative emissions technologies and beyond". Frontiers in Climate. 2 575716. Bibcode:2021FrCli...2.5716G. doi:10.3389/fclim.2020.575716. hdl:10754/667576.
