= María Merced González González =

Mexican politician (born 1970)

Senator of the Congress of the Union for Hidalgo
- Incumbent
- Assumed office 2 January 2019 Serving with Navor Rojas Mancera and Nuvia Mayorga Delgado
- Preceded by: Angélica García Arrieta

Personal details
- Born: María Merced González González; 5 December 1970 (age 55) Maney, Hidalgo, Mexico
- Party: Morena
- Occupation: Politician

María Merced González González (Note: In this Mexican name, the surname is González and the second or maternal family name is González.) (born 5 December 1970) is a Mexican politician affiliated with the National Regeneration Movement (Morena) party. She was a senator of the Congress of the Union for the state of Hidalgo from 2 January 2019 to 31 August 2024.

== Early years ==
María Merced González González was born in the town of Maney, municipality of Huichapan, in the state of Hidalgo. She studied public accounting and a specialization in administration and development of companies and businesses.

In the 2016 state elections, she was a candidate of the Movimiento de Regeneración Nacional party for deputy for the Congress of Hidalgo for the 6th local district, but lost the election to the National Action Party (PAN) candidate.

== Senator ==
In the 2018 federal elections, she was the alternate of Angélica García Arrieta, first-round candidate for senator for the state of Hidalgo on behalf of the Movimiento Regeneración Nacional (Morena) party, holding office for the 64th session of Congress. After García Arrieta's death on 22 December 2018, González González took over the seat on 2 January 2019. In the Senate, she was the secretary of the mining and regional development commission.
