= Pollo Brujo =

Central, North and South American chicken restaurant chain

Pollo Brujo is a fast food chain of chicken restaurants, which operates with 10 locations in Guatemala, as well as in Colombia, and Costa Rica.

== See also ==
- List of chicken restaurants
- Pollo Campero
