= Saelices de Mayorga =

Coordinates: 42°13′N 5°12′W

Saelices de Mayorga, Spain
- Flag Coat of arms
- Interactive map of Saelices de Mayorga, Spain
- Country: Spain
- Autonomous community: Castile and León
- Province: Valladolid
- Municipality: Saelices de Mayorga

Area
  - Total: 15 km^{2} (5.8 sq mi)

Population (2025-01-01)
  - Total: 116
  - Density: 7.7/km^{2} (20/sq mi)
- Time zone: UTC+1 (CET)
  - Summer (DST): UTC+2 (CEST)

Saelices de Mayorga is a municipality located in the province of Valladolid, Castile and León, Spain. According to the 2004 census (INE), the municipality has a population of 179 inhabitants.

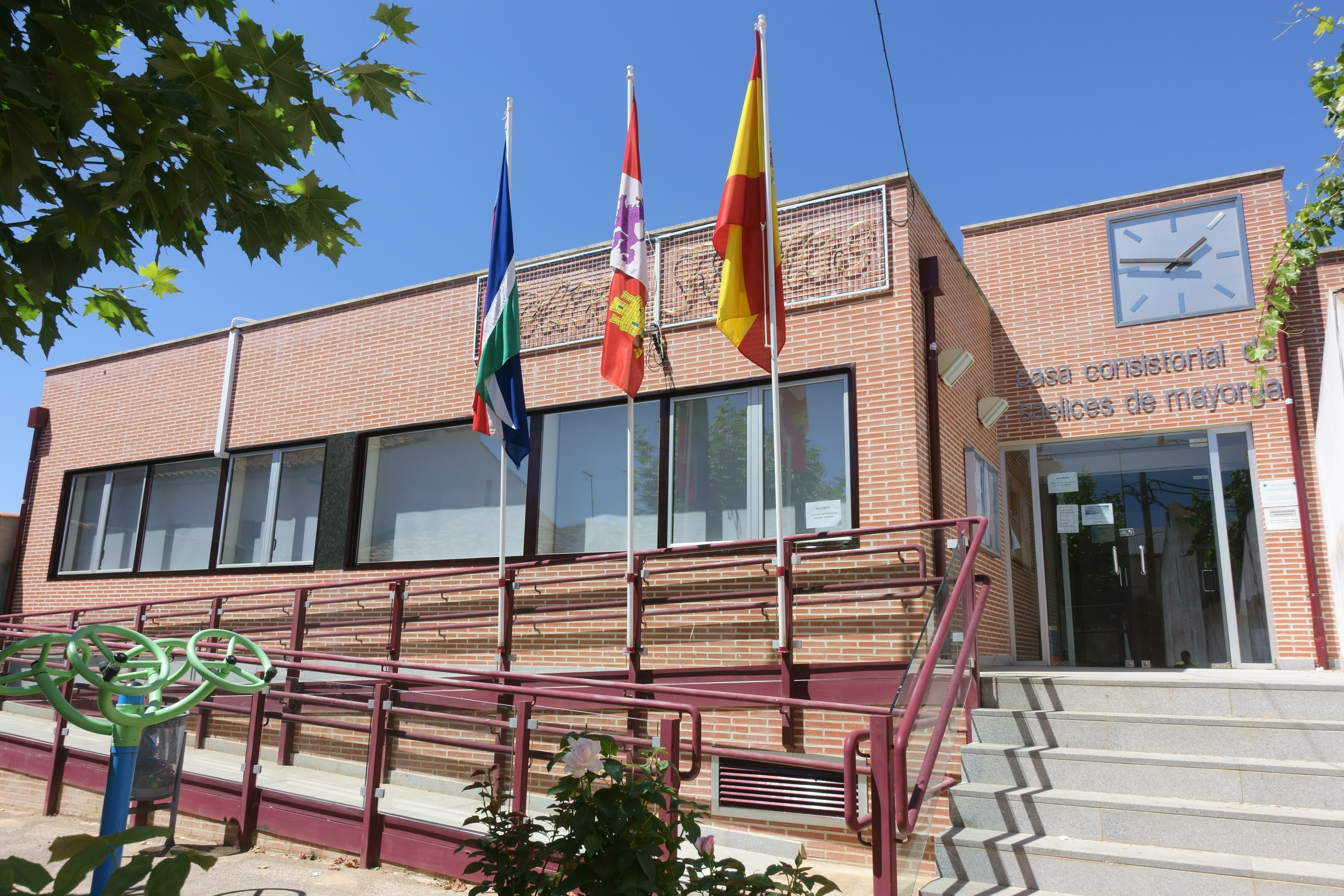
Saelices de Mayorga Town Hall Building
