= San Cristóbal Totonicapán =

Coordinates: 14°55′N 91°26′W

- Municipality
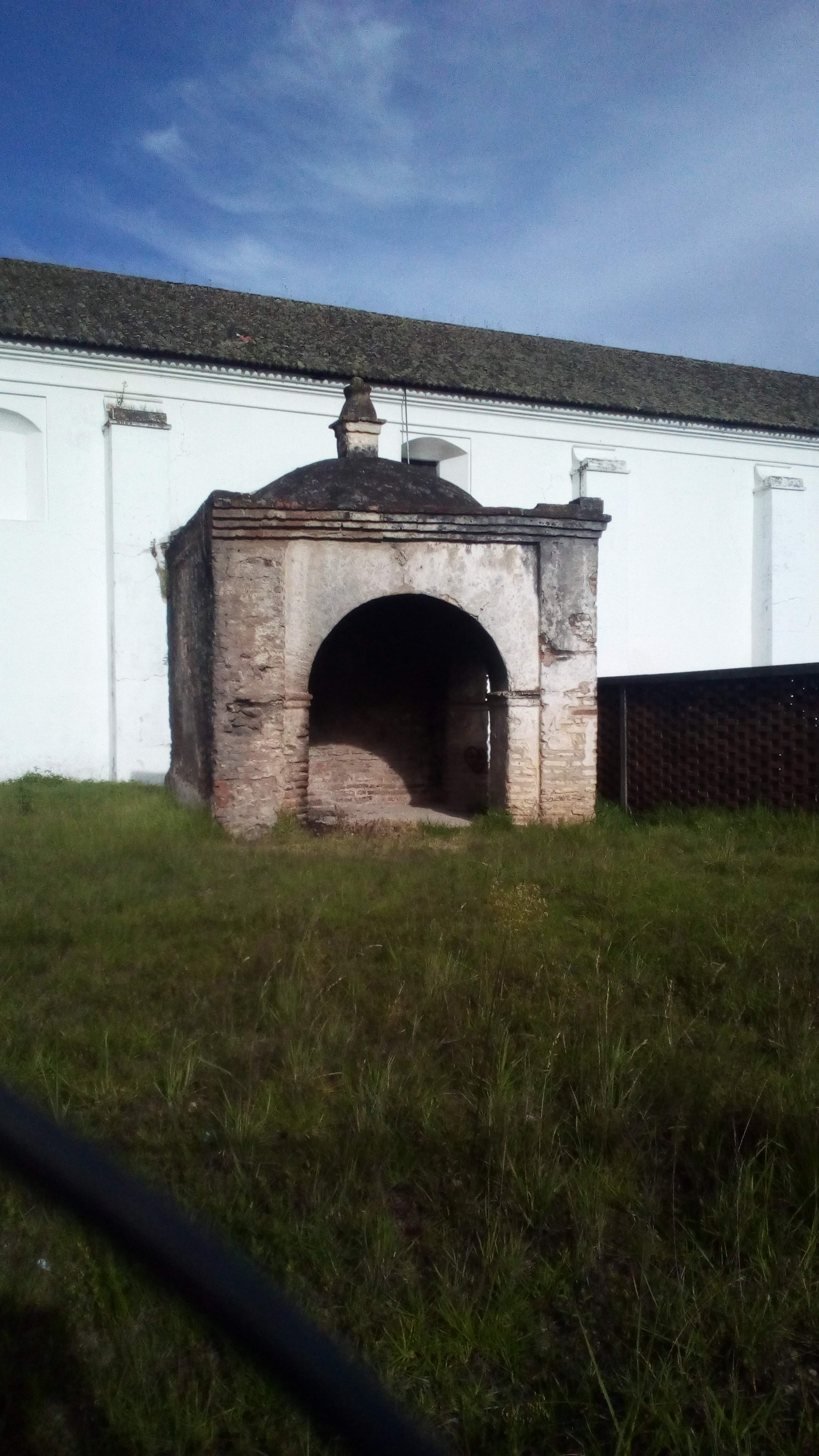

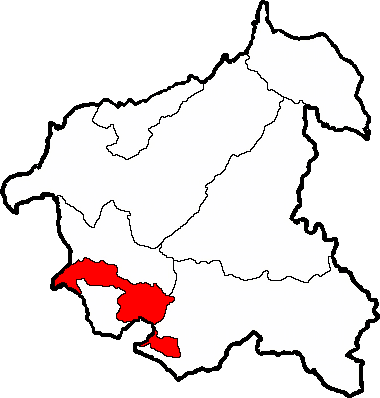
- San Cristóbal Totonicapán within Totonicapán

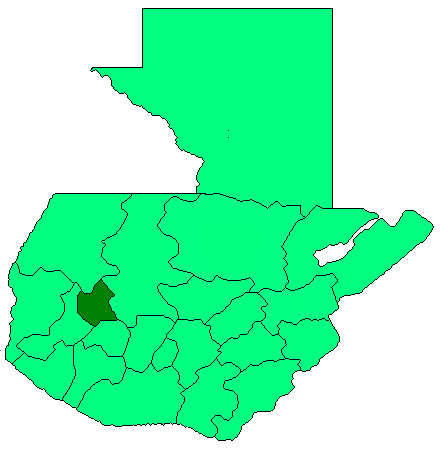
- Totonicapán within Guatemala
- Country: Guatemala
- Department: Totonicapán

Government
  - Type: Municipal

Area
  - Total: 52.8 km^{2} (20.4 sq mi)

Population (2018 census)
  - Total: 36,119
  - Density: 684/km^{2} (1,770/sq mi)
  - Ethnicities: K'iche' Ladino
  - Religions: Catholicism Evangelicalism Maya

San Cristóbal Totonicapán is a town, with a population of 36,119, and a municipality in the Totonicapán department in the South-Western region of Guatemala. It celebrates its titular party on 25 July.

Spanish-born businessman Juan Bautista Gutiérrez migrated to San Cristóbal Totonicapán in the 1920s and began some of his first business ventures there, running a bookstore and making candles. He was eventually elected mayor for a time and helped introduce electricity and other viable infrastructure to the then-small indigenous town, including a bridge over the Samalá River that is still in good, working condition and actively utilized by the community. In addition, his children, including his daughter Isabel, were all born in San Cristóbal Totonicapán.
