= Dionisio Gutiérrez =

Guatemalan businessman and communicator (born 1959)

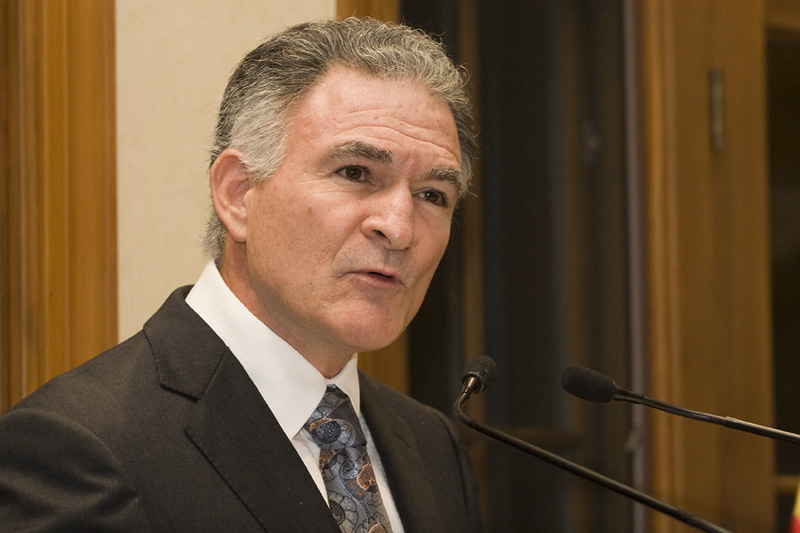
- Gutiérrez in 2012
- Born: Dionisio Gutiérrez Mayorga; 23 July 1959 (age 67); Guatemala City, Guatemala
- Education: Pontifical University of Salamanca
- Occupations: Businessman; Media personality
- Years active: 1979 – present
- Parent(s): Dionisio Gutiérrez; Esperanza Mayorga
- Relatives: Juan José Gutiérrez Mayorga (brother); Juan Bautista Gutiérrez (grandfather); Isabel Gutiérrez de Bosch (aunt); Juan Luis Bosch Gutiérrez (cousin); Felipe Bosch Gutiérrez (cousin)
- Website: www.dionisiogutierrez.gt

Dionisio Gutiérrez Mayorga (born 23 July 1959) is a Guatemalan businessman and media personality. He is currently the President of Fundación Libertad y Desarrollo.

== Early years and family ==
Dionisio Gutierrez is the second son of Dionisio Gutierrez and Esperanza Mayorga. His grandfather, Juan Bautista Gutiérrez, was a Spaniard businessman and entrepreneur who established himself in Guatemala in the first years of the 20th century.

On 3 October 1974, Gutierrez's father died in a plane crash. According to Francisco Perez de Antón, that tragedy led to a “generational void” inside the Gutierrez family, and Gutierrez began to work in Grupo Gutierrez in 1976, when he was only 17 years old.

== Business career ==
By the end of the 1970s, Gutiérrez and his cousin Juan Luis Bosch took on a shared chief executive officer role at Corporación Multi Inversiones, a family owned multinational corporation. Gutierrez held the presidency role in the company until In 2010, when he gave away his position in the company to his brother Juan José, to focus on the academia and political analysis think tank over which he presides.

== Civic career ==
Gutierrez was in projects of several student associations and groups during his college years, where he denounced both the actions of the military government and the Marxist guerrilla, including Electorama 82, an effort by young people to audit the electoral process of 7 March 1982. Gutierrez also participated with the “Student Committee Against Terrorism” and the “Civil Student Front”, with several publications in the independent journal El Imparcial

For seven years, Gutierrez was president of the Free Enterprise Chamber and led one of the first programs of political surveys in the country. The first publication “Guatemala Responde 1987” (Guatemala Answers 1987) revealed Guatemalan citizen's opinion about the economic, political and social situation in the first years of Vinicio Cerezo. In 1989, he published a second edition “Guatemala Responde IV: Percepciones y opiniones del pueblo guatemalteco después de 37 meses de gobierno democrático” and in 1990, he issued a political survey about the voter's preferences on the presidential elections of that year.

Gutierrez hosted a TV show broadcast in Guatemala, other cities in Central America and the United States called Libre Encuentre, which encouraged thought and debate among leaders from different sectors of the society. Gutierrez stirred debate and controversy among guests from all social sectors and experts, in many occasions abandoning his role as moderator, and participating in the arguments.

In May 1993, Jorge Antonio Serrano Elías, tried to dissolve the Congress, dismiss the Supreme Court of Justice, the Constitutional Court and the Human Rights Delegate. Gutiérrez was among a group of citizens who issued a declaration "Given the political crisis the country is undergoing", better known as the document of "Los Abajo Firmantes", where they rejected the actions of Elías, calling him "dictator" and demanding his resignation as well as the restitution of the Public Powers of the republic. They organized citizen protests, marches and rallies in front of the National Palace, through a platform called the National Consensus Instance.

In early 2003, president Alfonso Portillo attacked the media calling them “clowns”, saying they were “at the service of obscure interests” and referring to Gutierrez as “the circus owner”. Gutierrez issued a response stating that “the government called conspirator and subversive to any person who speaks the truth about the President”.

On 24 July 2003, former President Efraín Ríos Montt demanded that the Supreme Electoral Tribunal register him as a presidential candidate, despite being banned for having led a coup d'état. Several people took different points of the city, and one of the most threatened places was the Centro Empresarial building, where the corporate offices of Multi Inversiones is located. One of the most fierce opponents of the inscription of Ríos Montt was Gutierrez. According to Prensa Libre: "That day, the lives of hundreds of employees in that building was put at risk, because several tires were set on fire, which made the air unbreathable, and the mob threatened to burn the building." After being besieged for twelve hours, 900 people who had been trapped in the Centro Empresarial building were rescued and the protesters withdrew.

On Thursday, 1 July 2010, the government of President Álvaro Colom denounced a "destabilization plan composed of attacks on security forces and reports in some media outlets" and accused Gutiérrez as one of those responsible for that plan. In response, the businessman said "With all due respect, I ask you not to fall into the totalitarian trap". Months later, Gutiérrez started one of the most controversial episodes of 2010 due to a comment against President Colom and his wife at the National Entrepreneurs Conference. After the incident, Gutierrez distanced himself from the “Libre Encuentro" program and the country, alleging, among other reasons, the "evident increase in forms of harassment and intimidation, even constant death threats" against him.

On 19 September 2018, after three years away from television, Gutierrez made a comeback to the screen with the show “Razón de Estado”, broadcast through Guatevisión channel. According to the show's website, “it is a tribune for debate and reflection, engaged with freedom, democracy, and rule of law”.

== Fundación Libertad y Desarrollo ==
In 2012, Gutiérrez created the Fundación Libertad y Desarrollo (Freedom and Development Foundation), an independent, private think tank dedicated to the study and analysis of social, economic and political issues to promote values and principles of a free society. As president of the Foundation, Gutiérrez leads a team of intellectuals with whom he works in multiple civic activities and develops the articulation of long-term state proposals for Central America.

On 27 January 2013, the Foundation sponsored the television show "Dimension", which was broadcast weekly on Canal 3, under the direction of Gutiérrez until August 2018. The show dealt with social issues and tried to promote participation "to generate reflection on the complex problems that afflict Guatemalan and Central American societies”.

In August 2015, following the announcement of the participation of Vice President Roxana Baldetti and President Otto Pérez Molina in a structure dedicated to customs fraud in Guatemala known as La Línea, Gutiérrez called for the resignation of Molina in a public letter from the Libertad y Desarrollo Foundation.

In an interview in a local media outlet, Gutiérrez said about Molina "An individual I met in the Serranazo days, and with whom I no longer had a significant contact until the end of 2010, when he was the most persecuted opposition politician, and I was the most persecuted civil citizen by the government of the UNE party. And four months after he was appointed President, I denounced his would be another government taking Guatemala towards lost paths."

In September 2016, through the Fundación Libertad y Desarrollo, Gutierrez opened the first Citizen Convention with a speech focused on inequality in the country. On 7 March 2018, the third Citizen Convention focused on the importance of the fight against corruption in Guatemala. Attorney General Thelma Aldana and Chief of the International Commission Against Impunity in Guatemala (CICIG), Iván Velásquez were invited as panelists, the latter participated through a pre-recorded interview. In his keynote, Gutierrez said that president Jimmy Morales had not been invited and encouraged him to "stop shaming Guatemala" and to "stop representing the obscure forces that don’t want the country to change. Your actions contradict your words."

On Wednesday 6 March 2019, the fourth Citizen Convention treated the electoral year under the title "Free elections or sequestered democracy?". More than 2,000 Guatemalans participated in the event, who came to listen to the conference by Gutiérrez; the panel of former presidents Luis Alberto Lacalle (Uruguay), Andrés Pastrana (Colombia), Jorge Tuto Quiroga (Bolivia) and Felipe Calderón (Mexico); the presentation of the First Electoral Survey 2019; and a panel of national analysts on the outlook for the 2019 elections.

In late February 2018, Gutierrez made a public appearance, in the days of the formation of the Frente Ciudadano Contra la Corrupción (Citizen Front Against Corruption). The role of Gutierrez at the front of the fight against corruption has earned him criticism from different sectors. On 30 April 2018, Gutierrez sent a letter to twelve Senators and Congressmen of the United States, about the importance of the permanence of CICIG in Guatemala. In that letter, Gutierrez lists a number of prosecuted officials by the Guatemalan justice due to corruption. He also stated that CICIG “has demonstrated its ability to bring justice to Guatemala, and for the first time in recent history, let Guatemalans have trust and faith in their government institutions.

On Wednesday 4 March 2020, Gutiérrez and Fundación Libertad y Desarrollo hosted the Fifth Citizen Convention, called "Central America, shared threats and opportunities; a common destiny”, which addressed the shared challenges of the Central American region and was attended by more than 30 global leaders. Gutiérrez presented the “Joint Declaration on the Central American Economic Community”, a document that was born out of the citizenry and seeks the presidents of the region and all the sectors involved in decision-making to join this commitment.

In February 2022, through an official statement, Fundación Libertad y Desarrollo informs about its internationalization, with the creation of offices in the state of Florida, in the United States, as well as in the city of Madrid, in Spain. This expansion aims to bring the analysis of institutional issues and the promotion of free societies to an Ibero-American spectrum.

== Awards and honors ==
In 2012, the Power Awards and the American Business Council Foundation of the United States recognized the efforts and trajectory of Gutiérrez by giving him the award “Empowering Democracy".

In 2014, King Felipe VI of Spain, awarded the Order of Civil Merit in Commendation to Gutiérrez.

He is also a founder and trustee of the School of Government in Guatemala.

In September 2019, he was selected by Summa Magazine as the business leader with the best reputation in Central America.

In July 2020, he was featured in Forbes Central America] magazine where, he reaffirmed the need for Central American integration as the only formula for the development of the region and to mitigate the impact of the COVID-19 crisis.

In February 2021 he became the only Latin American on the Freedom House Board of Trustees. He is also a member of the Advisory Council of the Bush Institute in Dallas, Texas.

In September 2024, Dionisio Gutierrez appeared as one of the most influential leaders in Latin America according to Bloomberg.

In 2025, Gutiérrez was awarded the Enrique V. Iglesias Award, a recognition that highlights the work of personalities who make an extraordinary contribution to the evolution and development of Ibero-American countries, as well as to the promotion of an inclusive spirit that enables the sharing of common challenges and values.

In May 2026, during the institution’s 85th anniversary celebration, Freedom House honored Dr. Gutiérrez with the 2026 Beacon Award for his leadership at the helm of the Fundación Libertad y Desarrollo and for his decades-long commitment to promoting principled public debate, institutional integrity, and individual freedom. The previous year, the same award was presented to the government of Taiwan for its defense of democracy in the face of growing authoritarian threats.
