= Century 21 =

Century 21 may refer to:

- Century 21 (department store)
- Century 21 (political party)
- Century 21 Real Estate
- Century 21 Exposition, the 1962 World's Fair
- Century 21 Productions, a British TV production company

== See also ==
- 21st century (disambiguation)
