= Nuestro Diario =

- October 19, 2011 cover of Nuestro Diario
- Type: Daily newspaper
- Format: Tabloid
- Owner(s): Diarios Modernos, S. A.
- Language: Spanish
- Circulation: 270,000-300,000
- Website: www.nuestrodiario.com

Nuestro Diario is the most circulated newspaper in Guatemala and one of the most circulated in Latin America. Its daily edition runs between 270,000 and 300,000 units per day.

Nuestro Diario is published by Diarios Modernos, S. A.

It is a tabloid-style paper.

== See also ==
- List of newspapers in Guatemala
