= European Project on Ocean Acidification =

logo

The European Project on Ocean Acidification (EPOCA) was Europe's first major research initiative and the first large-scale international research effort devoted to studying the impacts and consequences of ocean acidification. EPOCA was an EU FP7 Integrated Project active during four years, from 2008 to 2012.

The EPOCA consortium brought together more than 160 researchers from 32 institutes in 10 European countries (Belgium, France, Germany, Iceland, Italy, the Netherlands, Norway, Sweden, Switzerland, and the United Kingdom) and was coordinated by the French Centre National de la Recherche Scientifique (CNRS) with the project office based at the Institut de la Mer de Villefranche, France (formerly Observatoire Océanologique de Villefranche).

== Scope ==
The research carried out through EPOCA was structured around four themes :

1. Theme 1 investigated the changes in ocean chemistry and biogeography across space and time. Paleo-reconstruction methods were used on several archives, including foraminifera and deep-sea corals, to determine the past variability in ocean chemistry and to tie these to present-day chemical and biological observations;
2. Theme 2 studied the sensitivity of marine organisms, communities and ecosystems to ocean acidification. Key climate-relevant biogeochemical processes such as calcification, primary production and nitrogen fixation were investigated using a large array of techniques, ranging from molecular tools to physiological and ecological approaches. Perturbation experiments were carried out both in the laboratory and in the field, including a major large-scale offshore mesocosm experiment in Svalbard in 2010
3. Theme 3 focused on the integration of the results from Themes 1 and 2 in biogeochemical, sediment, and coupled ocean-climate models to better understand and project the responses of the Earth system to ocean acidification. Special attention was paid to feedbacks of physiological changes on the carbon, nitrogen, sulfur and iron cycles and how these changes will affect and be affected by future climate change;
4. Finally, Theme 4 synthesized the results from Themes 1-3 and assessed uncertainties, risks and thresholds ("tipping points") related to ocean acidification at scales ranging from subcellular to ecosystem and local to global scales. A second focus of this theme was to communicate the findings to fellow scientists but also to policy makers, media, schools and the general public.

== Legacy ==
EPOCA significantly contributed to advancing the state of knowledge on ocean acidification and its impact on marine organisms and ecosystems. The project produced more than 200 research articles, equivalent to 20% of the peer-reviewed scientific literature on ocean acidification published during the period 2009-2012.

EPOCA leaves behind products still widely used by the international scientific community working on ocean acidification, such as :

- EPOCA scientists designed and developed the R software package seacarb, which calculates parameters of the seawater carbonate system and includes functions useful for ocean acidification research;
- EPOCA led the production of the community-reviewed “Guide to best practices in ocean acidification research and data reporting”, published in 2010 as a collaborative effort of EPOCA and international colleagues to provide guidance on design of ocean acidification experiments and to facilitate comparisons of studies and;
- EPOCA maintained and pioneered several resources made available to the international ocean acidification research community :
  - a news stream on ocean acidification launched in 2006 by Jean-Pierre Gattuso, which provides daily information on the latest scientific articles, media coverage, meetings, and job and training opportunities;
  - a bibliographic database including research articles, books and book chapters with allocated keywords, launched in 1995 by Jean-Pierre Gattuso and;
  - a compilation of data from peer-reviewed studies investigating a biological response to ocean acidification.
