= La Epoca =

- Type: Weekly newspaper
- Editor: Byron Barrera
- Staff writers: Julio Godoy, Haroldo Shetumul, and others
- Founded: February 26, 1988
- Ceased publication: June 10, 1988
- Political alignment: Liberal
- Language: Spanish
- Headquarters: Guatemala City

La Epoca was a liberal weekly newspaper that operated in Guatemala for four months in 1988. In June, its offices were firebombed, and its senior staff fled the country. The office of La Epoca was destroyed by Guatemalan government backed terrorists for their criticism of the government. One year after the firebombing, La Epoca journalist Julio Godoy wrote of the U.S. support of the Guatemalan government:

"while the Moscow imposed government in Prague would degrade and humiliate reformers, the Washington made government in Guatemala would kill them. It still does, in a virtual genocide that has taken more than 150,000 victims (in what Amnesty International calls) a government program of political murder."

== See also ==
- List of newspapers in Guatemala
