= Juan José Gutiérrez Mayorga =

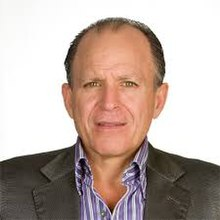
- Born: 1958 (age 67–68); Guatemala City, Guatemala
- Occupation: Businessman
- Parent(s): Dionisio Gutiérrez; Esperanza Mayorga
- Relatives: Dionisio Gutiérrez Mayorga (brother); Juan Bautista Gutiérrez (grandfather); Isabel Gutiérrez de Bosch (aunt); Juan Luis Bosch Gutiérrez (cousin)

Juan José Gutiérrez Mayorga (born 1958) is a Guatemalan businessman who is the Chairman of CMI Foods, a part of Corporación Multi Inversiones, a corporation founded in Guatemala in 1920. CMI currently employs 54,000 people in 15 countries in 2 continents.

In 2005, Newsweek Magazine included Juan José Gutiérrez as one of the "10 Big Thinkers For Big Business", along with Steven Case, Thomas Middelhoff, and Pierre Omidyar, among others. He served as president of the Juan Bautista Gutiérrez Foundation, CMI’s social arm focused on education, health, and entrepreneurship. In May 2026, he was succeeded by Felipe Bosch Gutiérrez as president of the foundation.

== Family ==
His grandfather, Juan Bautista Gutiérrez, was one of the founders of Multi-Inversiones, S.A. In the 1920s, Juan Bautista Gutiérrez opened a store in San Cristóbal Totonicapán, in western Guatemala. In 1936 he founded Molino Excélsior (flour mill) and in 1965 he started poultry operations upon the purchase of Villalobos farm. It was in the 1970s when, as an initiative of his son Dionisio Gutiérrez Sr., he entered the fried chicken business, creating Pollo Campero.

On October 3, 1974. Dionisio Gutiérrez Sr. and Alfonso Bosch both died in a plane crash near San José Pinula as they traveled to Honduras to provide assistance to Hurricane Fifi victims.

== International Expansion ==
In 1982, at only 23, Juan José Gutiérrez Mayorga became the manager of Pollo Campero.

In 2002, Pollo Campero was introduced in Los Angeles California. By 2005, Pollo Campero had 196 restaurants in 9 countries; 22 of the restaurants were located in El Salvador and in some of the largest US cities, such as Los Angeles, Washington, Dallas, and Houston. In 2006, Juan José Gutiérrez Mayorga and the Pollo Campero team opened the first Pollo Campero restaurant in Spain.

== Armed attack against him ==
In 1995 Juan José Gutiérrez Mayorga was the President of the Guatemalan Chamber of Industry. On May 16, 1995, during the night, he was the victim of a planned attack to kill him. It is believed that a group of around 10 armed people opened fire against the car he rode in. It was seriously damaged by the bullets, but thanks to the armoring, he was unharmed.
