= El Siglo (Guatemala) =

Guatemalan online newspaper

- Por una nación libre, justa y solidaria
- Type: Digital newspaper
- Owner: Novigo S.A.
- Founded: 1991; 35 years ago
- Language: Spanish
- Headquarters: Guatemala City
- Website: elsiglo.com.gt

El Siglo (Spanish for "The Century") is an online newspaper headquartered in Guatemala City.
