= El Siglo (Argentina) =

Newspaper in San Miguel de Tucumán, Argentina

- Type: Daily newspaper
- Editor: Héctor Rafael Lafuente
- Associate editor: Cristian Argañaraz
- Founded: 1990
- Language: Spanish
- Headquarters: Tucumán, Argentina
- Website: El Siglo

El Siglo is a newspaper edited in the city of San Miguel de Tucumán, Tucumán Province, Argentina. It was founded on December 4, 1990, as Siglo XXI, but following its sale in 1998, the name was changed to its current form. The daily ranks third in the city of Tucumán by circulation, behind La Gaceta and El Tribuno de Tucumán.
