= Ronald Mayorga =

Ronald Mayorga Sánchez (born 26 June 1984, Yumbo, Valle del Cauca, Colombia) is a Colombian journalist and TV anchor of La Red on Caracol Television in Colombia. He works as a radio journalist who works with "Blue Radio", one of the radio stations imported from Latin America as a host in Vox Populi.

== Early life ==
Mayorga decided on journalism as a youth. In 2006, he graduated with honors in "La Universidad del Valle" and received the award for "Best Student of the Faculty of Arts".

== Career ==
Mayorga worked for of El Tiempo, the number one newspaper in Colombia. He served as Communications Director of News Reporting for the Municipality of Yumbo Caracol. He divides his time between television’s La Red [es], the radio Blue, and his foundation The Valley of Our Dreams, which started in 2011 with four friends to support children in Valle del Cauca. This year, The Valley of Our Dreams achieved its goal of giving a thousand pairs of shoes to the community, as well as building homes and spending time with the children.

- La Red (2011-2015)
- Caracol TV, Caracol Noticias (2004-2008) Debut
- E! (2013)

== Recognition ==
Year	Category	Entertainment	Result
2014	TVyNovelas Award for Best Entertainment Program	La Red	Won
2015	TVyNovelas Award for Best Entertainment Program	La Red	Won
2015	India Catalina Award – Cartagena 2014	La Red	Won
