= Pollo Campero =

Guatemalan fast-food restaurant chain

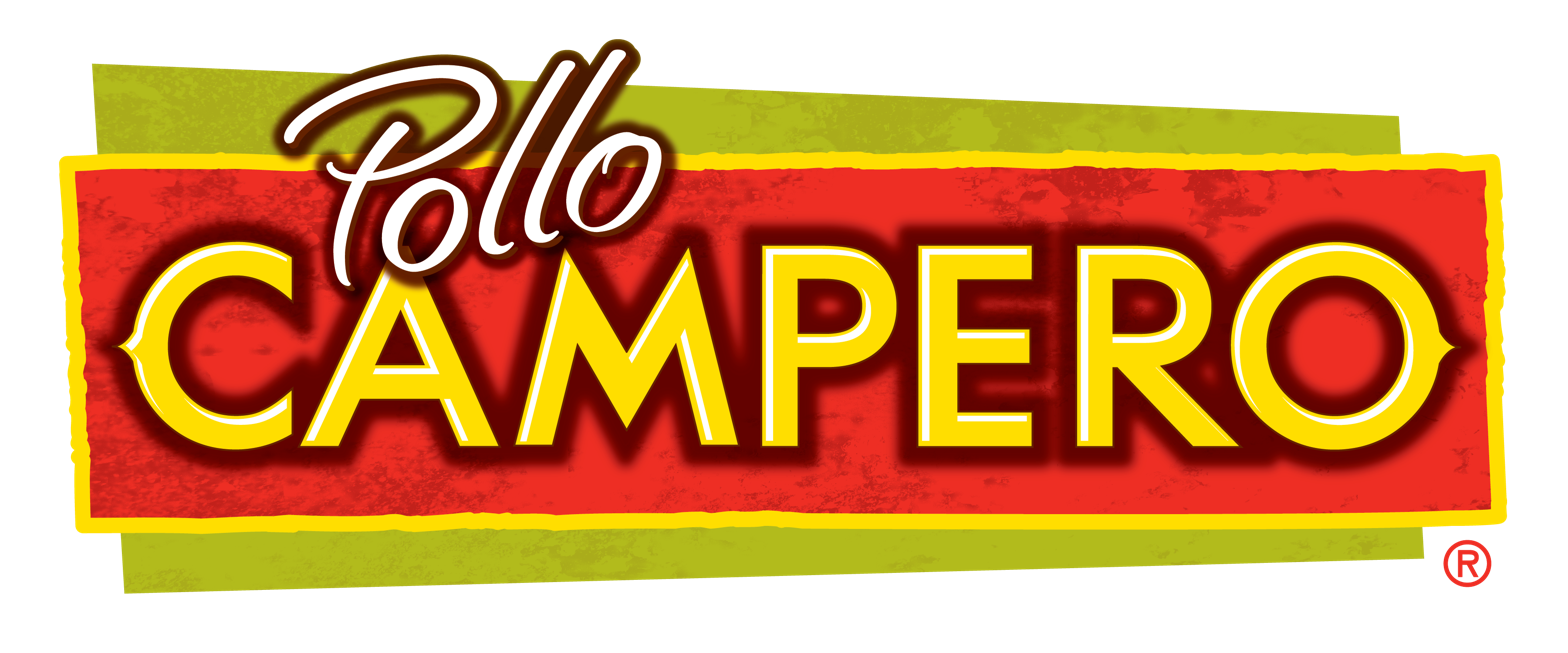
- Type: Private
- Industry: Fast food
- Founded: April 28, 1971; 55 years ago in Guatemala
- Headquarters: Dallas, Texas, United States
- Number of locations: About 400 worldwide
- Area served: Guatemala, El Salvador, Honduras, the United States, Mexico, Ecuador, and Spain
- Key people: Julio Sánchez (CEO)
- Products: Fried chicken, grilled chicken, chicken sandwiches, empanadas, salads, bowls, side dishes, and beverages
- Number of employees: 8,000+
- Parent: Corporación Multi Inversiones
- Website: www.campero.com

Pollo Campero is a Guatemalan fast-food restaurant chain specializing in fried and grilled chicken. The name is commonly translated from Spanish as "country chicken". Founded in Guatemala in 1971, the chain is part of Corporación Multi Inversiones (CMI), a Guatemalan family-owned conglomerate. CMI states that the brand operates in Guatemala, El Salvador, Honduras, the United States, Mexico, China, Ecuador, and Spain, with about 400 restaurants worldwide and more than 8,000 employees.

== History ==
Pollo Campero developed from the Gutiérrez family's poultry and restaurant businesses in Guatemala. In 1967, the family opened a restaurant selling fried chicken, and on April 28, 1971, the first official Pollo Campero restaurant opened in Guatemala. According to a 2014 case study in Management Decision, the chain expanded to El Salvador in 1972 and to Honduras in 1992.

In the 1990s, Pollo Campero began using franchising to expand outside its original markets. The company created a franchise program in 1997, which supported openings in Panama and later in Nicaragua, Costa Rica, Ecuador, and Mexico. By 2000, the chain had 143 restaurants and nearly 6,000 employees, making it one of the most internationalized Latin American fast-food chains at the time.

The company continued to add new formats and services as it expanded. CMI has described Pollo Campero as introducing self-service in 1980 and home delivery in 1995. In 2007, Pollo Campero opened a restaurant in Shanghai, its first location in China.

== United States expansion ==
Pollo Campero's entry into the United States was influenced by its popularity among Guatemalan and Salvadoran consumers, including a tradition of passengers carrying boxes of the chain's chicken on flights from Central America to the United States. The company opened its first U.S. restaurant in Los Angeles in April 2002. A Management Decision case study reported that the first U.S. restaurant generated $1 million in sales during its first 22 days.

The chain's early U.S. growth was concentrated among Central American immigrant communities, where the brand had strong nostalgic appeal. The Los Angeles Times reported in 2021 that travelers continued bringing Pollo Campero chicken from Central America to the United States even after the chain had opened U.S. restaurants.

Pollo Campero's U.S. division later expanded beyond its early diaspora-focused markets. In 2024, QSR Magazine reported that the company had opened 17 U.S. locations in the first half of the year and had celebrated its 100th U.S. restaurant in Miami Gardens, Florida. In February 2025, CMI announced the opening of Pollo Campero's 122nd U.S. restaurant, located inside Penn Station in New York City. By July 2025, CMI stated that Pollo Campero had more than 130 U.S. restaurants in more than 60 cities across 20 states.

== Corporate affairs ==
Pollo Campero is part of CMI Foods, the food business group of Corporación Multi Inversiones. CMI identifies José Gregorio Baquero as CEO of Pollo Campero and Juan José Gutiérrez Mayorga as chairman of CMI Foods.

Pollo Campero International is headquartered in Dallas, Texas. In 2016, the company moved its Dallas office from a 6,800-square-foot (630 m^{2}) space in Lincoln Center to a 12,633-square-foot (1,173.6 m^{2}) space in the Hidden Grove office building in North Dallas.

== See also ==
- List of chicken restaurants
- Pollo Brujo
- Pollo Campestre
