= Siglo Veintiuno =

Guatemalan daily newspaper

- Type: Daily newspaper
- Format: Tabloid
- Founder: José Rubén Zamora
- Founded: 1990
- Language: Spanish
- Headquarters: Guatemala City
- Website: http://www.s21.com.gt/

Siglo Veintiuno (English: Twenty-First Century) or stylized Siglo XXI is a Guatemalan daily newspaper. Founded in 1990 by José Rubén Zamora, the paper earned a reputation for independent, high-risk reporting. In 1995, its staff won the International Press Freedom Awards of the Committee to Protect Journalists and Zamora has won several individual awards for his work with the paper.

== History ==
Founded in 1990 by José Rubén Zamora, the paper advocated judicial and tax reforms and reported on dangerous subjects including narcotics smuggling, human rights issues, guerrilla groups, and corruption in the government of President Jorge Serrano. As a result, Zamora and the staff received death threats and were subject to physical attacks.

Three years later, Guatemala saw a constitutional crisis, in which Serrano suspended the constitution and dissolved Congress. He also instituted press censorship, surrounding the Siglo Veintiuno offices with national police forces. During this period, Zamora satirized the censorship by renaming the paper Siglo Catorce ("14th Century") and running stories covered in solid blocks of ink; he also faxed uncensored versions of the stories to newspapers in neighboring countries. The International Press Institute credits this clandestine reporting with contributing to Serrano's condemnation by the international community and his eventual flight from the country.

Zamora and other staff members were attacked several times in connection with their reporting. In 1995, Zamora's car was driven off the road by two people who threatened to kill him for publishing allegations in Siglo Veintiuno that the military of Guatemala had links to organized crime. In May 1996, attackers drove past his parked car, throwing two grenades at it; Zamora was unhurt.

In May 1996, Zamora left the paper following disagreements with its board of directors and founded a new paper, El Periódico.

== Recognition ==
In 1995, Zamora and the Siglo Veintiuno staff won International Press Freedom Awards from the Committee to Protect Journalists, which recognize courage in defending press freedom despite facing attacks, threats, or imprisonment. In the same year, Zamora won the Maria Moors Cabot Prize from Columbia University "for promoting press freedom and inter-American understanding". In 2000, he was named one of 50 World Press Freedom Heroes of the 20th century by the International Press Institute. The citation stated that "Zamora and Siglo Veintiuno were in the forefront of a civilian resistance that forced President Jorge Serrano Elias to relinquish his post after he attempted to seize dictatorial power in 1993."

== See also ==
- List of newspapers in Guatemala
